= Anton Döbele =

German World War II fighter pilot (1910–1943)

- Born: 16 November 1910; Ehrensberg
- Died: 11 November 1943 (aged 32); Vitebsk, Belarus
- Burial place: German War Cemetery at Vilnius-Vingio, Lithuania
- Military career
- Allegiance: Nazi Germany
- Branch: Luftwaffe
- Rank: Leutnant (Posthumously)
- Units: Condor Legion; JG 54
- Conflicts: Spanish Civil War; World War II: Operation Barbarossa
- Awards: Knight's Cross of the Iron Cross

Anton Döbele (16 November 1910 – 11 November 1943) was a German Luftwaffe ace and recipient of the Knight's Cross of the Iron Cross during World War II. The Knight's Cross of the Iron Cross and its variants were the highest awards in the military and paramilitary forces of Nazi Germany during World War II. On 11 November 1943, Döbele was killed in a mid-air collision with an Ilyushin Il-2 ground-attack aircraft. He was credited with 94 victories claimed in 458 combat missions. He was posthumously promoted to an officers rank and awarded the Knight's Cross on 26 March 1944.

== Career ==
Döbele was born on 16 November 1910 in Ehrensberg, present-day part of Bad Waldsee, at the time in the Kingdom of Württemberg within the German Empire. As an Unteroffizier (Staff Sergeant), he volunteered for service in the Condor Legion and participated in the Spanish Civil War with the ground staff. Following flight training, (Note: Flight training in the Luftwaffe progressed through the levels A1, A2 and B1, B2, referred to as A/B flight training. A training included theoretical and practical training in aerobatics, navigation, long-distance flights and dead-stick landings. The B courses included high-altitude flights, instrument flights, night landings and training to handle the aircraft in difficult situations.) Döbele was posted to the Ergänzungsgruppe, a supplementary training group, of Jagdgeschwader 54 (JG 54—54th Fighter Wing) in late 1940. Döbele claimed his first aerial victory on 28 July 1941 when he shot down a Chyetverikov MDR-6 aerial reconnaissance flying-boat near the island Ösel.

On 9 March 1942, the Ergänzungsgruppe of JG 54 was disbanded and the pilots were transferred to I. Gruppe (1st group) of JG 54. In consequence, Döbele assigned to 1. Staffel (1st squadron) of JG 54. At the time, 1. Staffel was commanded by Oberleutnant Heinz Lange and part of I. Gruppe of JG 54, which was headed by Hauptmann Hans Philipp. The Gruppe was based at Krasnogvardeysk and was fighting in the siege of Leningrad. Here, Döbele claimed a Polikarpov I-16 fighter shot down on 17 March. Döbele then served as a fighter pilot instructor before returning to JG 54. He then joined Walter Nowotny, his wingman Karl Schnörrer, and Rudolf Rademacher, forming a team known as the "chain of devils" (Teufelskette) or the Nowotny Schwarm, which during the course of the war was credited with 524 combined aerial victories, making them the most successful team in the Luftwaffe. Following his eighth aerial victoriy claimed on 13 January 1943, Döbele was awarded the Iron Cross 1st Class (Eisernes Kreuz erster Klasse) on 3 February.

=== Operation Citadel ===
In early July, I. Gruppe of JG 54 was ordered to move to Oryol, in the southern sector of Army Group Centre, where it fought in Operation Citadel which initiated the Battle of Kursk. Subordinated to Luftflotte 6 (Air Fleet 6), the Gruppe began relocating on 2 July and arrived at the airfield name Panikowo, a makeshift airfield created for the attack on the Kursk salient, on 4 July. The next day, the Wehrmacht launched Operation Citadel and I. Gruppe supported the attack of the 9th Army on the northern sector of the salient, escorting bombers of Kampfgeschwader 4, 51 and KG 53 (KG 4, KG 51—4th, 51st Bomber Wing), as well as Junkers Ju 87 dive bombers of Sturzkampfgeschwader 1 (StG 1—1st Dive Bomber Wing) to their target areas. That day, I. Gruppe claimed 59 aerial victories, including a Curtiss P-40 Warhawk fighter by Döbele in the vicinity of Maloarkhangelsk. On 6 July, I. Gruppe targeted the airspace near Ponyri and during multiple combat missions claimed 29 aerial victories which included two Lavochkin-Gorbunov-Gudkov LaGG-3 and three Lavochkin La-5 fighters shot down by Döbelle, making him an ace-in-a-day. The following morning, Döbele claimed a Yakovlev Yak-7 fighter shot down.

=== Battle at Kharkiv, Smolensk and Nevel ===
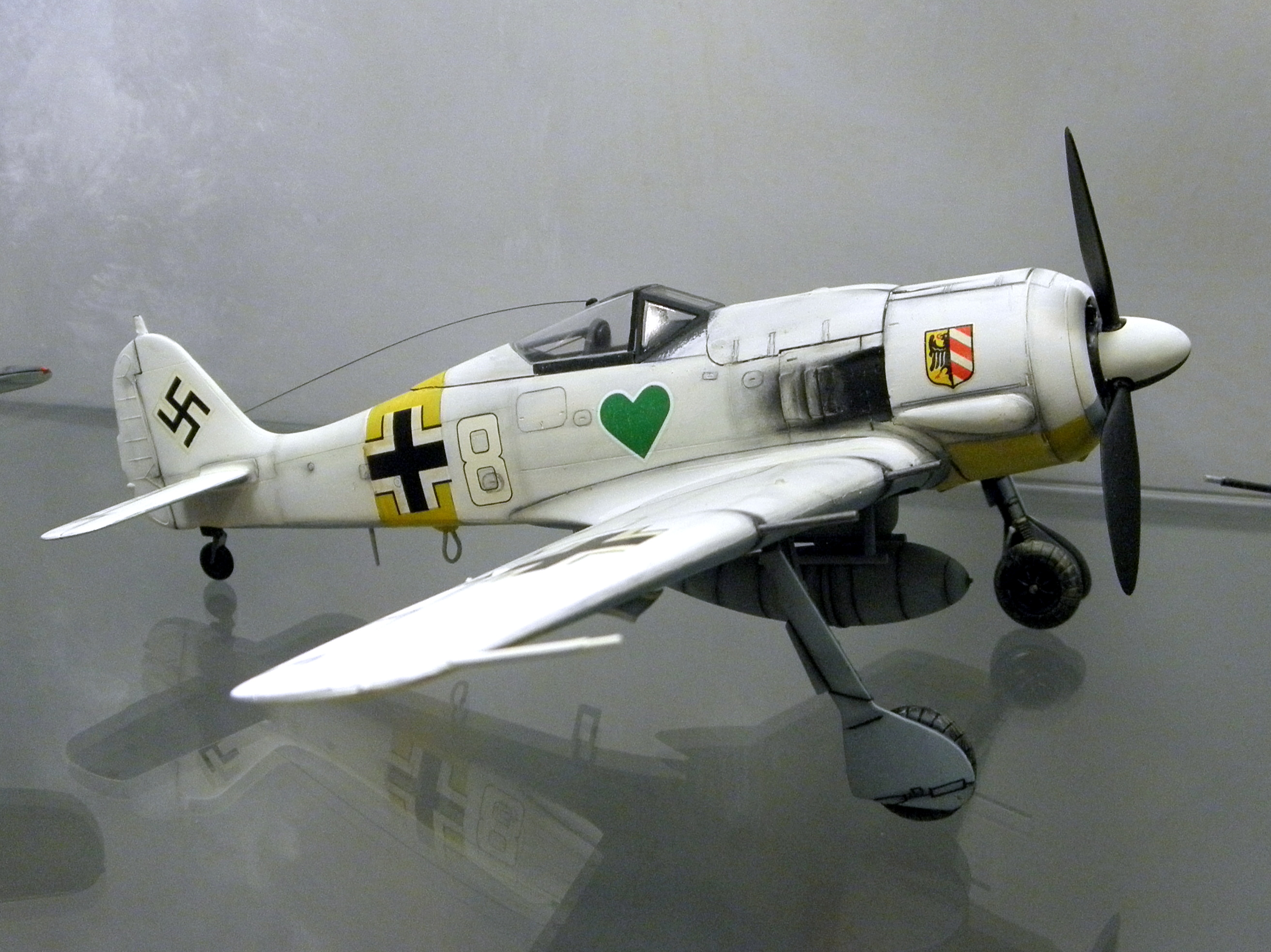
Scale model of Focke-Wulf Fw 190 A-4 JG 54.

On 9 August, I. Gruppe was ordered 400 kilometers (250 miles) south to Poltava Airfield where they were placed under the control of Luftflotte 4 (Air Fleet 4). The reason for this was a response to the successful Soviet Belgorod–Kharkiv offensive operation following the Battle of Kursk. On 11 August, Nowotny was temporarily appointed commander of I. Gruppe, a position he held until 15 September when he was officially assigned as Gruppenkommandeur. The next day, the Gruppe flew multiple combat air patrols and fighter escort for Ju 87 dive bombers in the area west of Kharkiv. That day, Döbele shot down a La-5 and a Yakovlev Yak-1 fighter. On 31 August, Döbele was awarded the German Cross in Gold (Deutsches Kreuz in Gold) and the Honor Goblet of the Luftwaffe (Ehrenpokal der Luftwaffe) on 13 September.

On 11 September, Döbele was nominated for the Knight's Cross of the Iron Cross (Ritterkreuz des Eisernen Kreuzes). Five days later, Nowotny submitted a report, requesting that Döbele be promoted to Leutnant (second lieutenant) for bravery before the enemy. At the time, Döbele had flown 418 combat missions and had been credited with 80 aerial victories to date. On 22 September, the Geschwaderkommodore (wing commander) of JG 54, Major Hubertus von Bonin, seconded the request, arguing that Döbele was an exceptional fighter pilot and leader.

On 23 October, during the Battle of Nevel, I. Gruppe moved to an airfield at Vitebsk where they supported Army Group Centre. Flying Focke-Wulf Fw 190 A-4 (Werknummer 7082—factory number) on 11 November 1943 at 10:42, Döbele was killed in a mid-air collision with an Ilyushin Il-2 ground-attack aircraft east of Vitebsk. (Note: Weal points out that sources differ as to cause of death. In another account by Weal, Döbele may have collided with another German fighter.) At his funeral, the guard of honour was made up of Rademacher, Schnörrer, Fritz Tegtmeier, and Otto Kittel, with Nowotny and von Bonin giving a eulogy. Posthumously, Döbele was promoted to Leutnant and awarded the Knight's Cross of the Iron Cross on 26 March 1944. He is interred at the German War Cemetery at Vilnius-Vingio.

== Summary of career ==
=== Aerial victory claims ===
According to Spick, Döbele was credited with 94 aerial victories claimed in over 458 combat missions. Mathews and Foreman, authors of Luftwaffe Aces — Biographies and Victory Claims, researched the German Federal Archives and found records for 93 aerial victory claims, all of which claimed on the Eastern Front.

Victory claims were logged to a map-reference (PQ = Planquadrat), for example "PQ 25 Ost 1956". The Luftwaffe grid map (Jägermeldenetz) covered all of Europe, western Russia and North Africa and was composed of rectangles measuring 15 minutes of latitude by 30 minutes of longitude, an area of about 360 square miles (930 km^{2}). These sectors were then subdivided into 36 smaller units to give a location area 3 km × 4 km (1.9 mi × 2.5 mi) in size.

Chronicle of aerial victories
This and the ♠ (Ace of spades) indicates those aerial victories which made Döbele an ace-in-a-day, a term which designates a fighter pilot who has shot down five or more airplanes in a single day. This and the ? (question mark) indicates information discrepancies listed by Prien, Stemmer, Rodeike, Bock, Mathews and Foreman.
Claim	Date	Time	Type	Location	Claim	Date	Time	Type	Location
– 1. Staffel of the Ergänzungsgruppe of Jagdgeschwader 54 – Operation Barbarossa — 22 June – 5 December 1941
1	28 July 1941	07:43	MBR-2? (Note: According to Mathews and Foreman claimed as a Chyetverikov MDR-6.)	PQ 25 Ost 1956 over sea, west of Ösel	2	30 July 1941	14:02	I-15	PQ 25 Ost 18461; 30 km (19 mi) west of Demyansk
– 1. Staffel of the Ergänzungsgruppe of Jagdgeschwader 54 – Eastern Front — 6 December 1941 – 9 March 1942
4	4 February 1942	09:38	I-18 (MiG-1)	8 km (5.0 mi) northwest of Malaya Vishera					
– 1. Staffel of Jagdgeschwader 54 – Eastern Front — March 1942 – 11 November 1943
4	17 March 1942	17:57	I-16		50	7 August 1943	08:44	Yak-9	PQ 35 Ost 54821; 25 km (16 mi) southwest of Bolkhov
5	30 December 1942	13:25	Yak-4	PQ 2863	51	7 August 1943	08:59	Yak-9	PQ 35 Ost 54732; 25 km (16 mi) east-northeast of Karachev
6	7 January 1943	09:41	I-16	PQ 1964	52	7 August 1943	11:41	La-5	PQ 35 Ost 54641; 25 km (16 mi) west-southwest of Bolkhov
7? (Note: This claim is not listed by Prien, Stemmer, Rodeike, Bock.)	12 January 1943	13:33	Il-2	vicinity of Mga	53	12 August 1943	09:15	La-5	PQ 35 Ost 41693
8	13 January 1943	13:25	Il-2	PQ 10173 vicinity of Mga	54	12 August 1943	14:02	Yak-1	PQ 35 Ost 51343, Boromlia; 45 km (28 mi) northwest of Grayvoron
9	23 February 1943	07:10	La-5	PQ 36 Ost 10152 southeast of Shlisselburg	55	14 August 1943	09:50	La-5	PQ 35 Ost 51734; 10 km (6.2 mi) northwest of Bohodukhiv
10	7 March 1943	16:25	LaGG-3	PQ 35 Ost 28382; 15 km (9.3 mi) southwest of Demyansk	56	15 August 1943	07:05	La-5	PQ 35 Ost 51821; 15 km (9.3 mi) northeast of Bohodukhiv
11	15 March 1943	08:10	Il-2	PQ 35 Ost 18251; 20 km (12 mi) southeast of Staraya Russa	57	19 August 1943	15:44	Il-2	PQ 35 Ost 51511 northeast of Bohodukhiv
12	15 March 1943	10:59	La-5	PQ 35 Ost 18253; 20 km (12 mi) southeast of Staraya Russa	58	19 August 1943	15:53	Il-2	PQ 35 Ost 51394; 15 km (9.3 mi) southwest of Belgorod
13	17 March 1943	13:42	LaGG-3	PQ 35 Ost 18133; 10 km (6.2 mi) southeast of Staraya Russa	59	20 August 1943	09:50	La-5	PQ 35 Ost 41454
14	19 March 1943	09:47	La-5	PQ 36 Ost 10189 southeast of Shlisselburg	60	20 August 1943	14:42	Il-2	PQ 35 Ost 51383; 30 km (19 mi) west-northwest of Grayvoron
15	19 March 1943	10:05	LaGG-3	PQ 36 Ost 00283; 20 km (12 mi) west of Mga	61	20 August 1943	14:53	Il-2	PQ 35 Ost 51523 northeast of Bohodukhiv
16	22 March 1943	08:44	Yak-1	PQ 36 Ost 00332 vicinity of Gatchina	62	21 August 1943	16:46	Il-2	PQ 35 Ost 51861; 25 km (16 mi) east of Bohodukhiv
17? (Note: This claim is not listed by Prien, Stemmer, Rodeike, Bock. The authors attribute this claim to Oberfeldwebel Fritz Tegtmeier.)	11 April 1943	18:25	Il-2	3 km (1.9 mi) south of Leningrad	63	23 August 1943	06:02	La-5	PQ 35 Ost 51541 northeast of Bohodukhiv
18	26 April 1943	14:15? (Note: According to Mathews and Foreman claimed at 14:16.)	Il-2	PQ 36 Ost 00181 vicinity of Leningrad	64	23 August 1943	17:01	Pe-2	PQ 35 Ost 60154; Gulf of Finland, north of Kunda
19	26 April 1943	14:16	I-16	PQ 36 Ost 00181; 15 km (9.3 mi) northwest of Pushkin	65	23 August 1943	17:04	La-5	PQ 35 Ost 60164; Gulf of Finland, north of Kunda
20? (Note: This claim is not listed by Mathews and Foreman.)	28 April 1943	19:33	Il-2	PQ 26 Ost 90224	66	23 August 1943	17:10	La-5	PQ 35 Ost 60273; Gulf of Finland, north of Kunda
21	8 June 1943	16:15	LaGG-3	PQ 36 Ost 10254; 30 km (19 mi) west-southwest of Shlisselburg	67	24 August 1943	07:37	La-5	PQ 35 Ost 51384; 30 km (19 mi) west-northwest of Grayvoron
22	17 June 1943	10:55	LaGG-3	PQ 26 Ost 90241; 10 km (6.2 mi) south of Lomonosov	68	28 August 1943	11:48	Pe-2	PQ 35 Ost 43822; 15 km (9.3 mi) east-northeast of Sevsk
23	19 June 1943	20:53	LaGG-5	PQ 36 Ost 20121, Volkhovstroy southwest of Volkhov	69	28 August 1943	11:52	LaGG-3	PQ 35 Ost 43822; 15 km (9.3 mi) east-northeast of Sevsk
24	21 June 1943	15:33	La-5	PQ 36 Ost 21754, Novaya Ladoga; 20 km (12 mi) north-northwest of Volkhov	70	1 September 1943	06:22	Yak-1	PQ 35 Ost 35371; 5 km (3.1 mi) northeast of Yelnya
25	21 June 1943	20:05	LaGG-3	PQ 36 Ost 20374; 20 km (12 mi) west-northwest of Volkhov	71	1 September 1943	12:13	Pe-2	PQ 35 Ost 35343; 10 km (6.2 mi) southeast of Yelnya
26	24 June 1943	06:30	LaGG-3	PQ 36 Ost 10224; 40 km (25 mi) west of Volkhov	72	1 September 1943	12:17	Pe-2	PQ 35 Ost 35392; 15 km (9.3 mi) east of Yelnya
27	24 June 1943	06:40	LaGG-3	PQ 36 Ost 10253; 30 km (19 mi) west-southwest of Shlisselburg	73	2 September 1943	11:00	Il-2	PQ 35 Ost 35343; 10 km (6.2 mi) southeast of Yelnya
28	24 June 1943	07:02	Yak-1? (Note: According to Mathews and Foreman claimed as a Lavochkin-Gorbunov-Gudkov LaGG-3.)	PQ 36 Ost 20121, Volkhovstroy west of Volkhov	74	2 September 1943	11:08	Il-2	PQ 35 Ost 25494; 15 km (9.3 mi) west of Yelnya
29	5 July 1943	12:46	P-40	PQ 35 63732; 25 km (16 mi) south-southwest of Maloarkhangelsk	75	2 September 1943	11:12	Il-2	PQ 35 Ost 35574; 30 km (19 mi) south-southwest of Yelnya
30♠	6 July 1943	08:16	La-5	PQ 35 Ost 63581; 20 km (12 mi) southwest of Maloarkhangelsk	76	2 September 1943	15:17	Il-2	PQ 35 Ost 35393; 15 km (9.3 mi) east of Yelnya
31♠	6 July 1943	14:08	La-5	PQ 35 Ost 63713; 40 km (25 mi) southwest of Maloarkhangelsk	77	6 September 1943	10:50	La-5	PQ 35 Ost 26881 vicinity of Yartsevo
32♠	6 July 1943	14:53	La-5	PQ 35 Ost 63732; 25 km (16 mi) south-southwest of Maloarkhangelsk	78	6 September 1943	10:51	La-5	PQ 35 Ost 26882 vicinity of Yartsevo
33♠	6 July 1943	18:34	LaGG-3	PQ 35 Ost 63862; 45 km (28 mi) north-northwest of Kursk	79	7 September 1943	11:33	Yak-9	PQ 35 Ost 26673; 25 km (16 mi) northeast of Moschna
34♠	6 July 1943	18:45	LaGG-3	PQ 35 Ost 63574; 35 km (22 mi) southwest of Maloarkhangelsk	80	10 September 1943	13:15	Yak-9	PQ 35 Ost 44152; 25 km (16 mi) south of Kirov
35	7 July 1943	08:43	Yak-7	PQ 35 Ost 63712; 40 km (25 mi) southwest of Maloarkhangelsk	81	14 September 1943	11:53	Yak-9	PQ 35 Ost 26482; 25 km (16 mi) north of Yartsevo
36	7 July 1943	18:12	LaGG-3	PQ 35 Ost 63748; 45 km (28 mi) southwest of Maloarkhangelsk	82	14 September 1943	15:32	P-39	PQ 35 Ost 44354; 10 km (6.2 mi) west of Dyatkovo
37	8 July 1943	17:41	La-5	PQ 35 Ost 63582; 20 km (12 mi) southwest of Maloarkhangelsk	83	13 October 1943	08:02	La-5	PQ 35 Ost 15543 south of Lenin
38	10 July 1943	10:37	LaGG-3	PQ 35 Ost 53833; 55 km (34 mi) north-northwest of Kursk	84	13 October 1943	08:05	La-5	PQ 35 Ost 15534 northeast of Gorki
39	13 July 1943	07:30	Il-2	PQ 35 Ost 64857; 20 km (12 mi) southeast of Mtsensk	85	15 October 1943	15:00	LaGG-3	PQ 35 Ost 15642; 20 km (12 mi) south-southeast of Krassnyj
40?	13 July 1943	14:02	Il-2	PQ 35 Ost 54441	86	21 October 1943	11:17	Yak-9	PQ 35 Ost 03842
41	16 July 1943	08:55	LaGG-3	PQ 35 Ost 54766; 20 km (12 mi) north-northwest of Bolkhov	87	22 October 1943	14:55	Yak-9	PQ 35 Ost 15341; 20 km (12 mi) west of Krassnyj
42	18 July 1943	04:52	LaGG-3	PQ 35 Ost 54493; 10 km (6.2 mi) northwest of Bolkhov	88	29 October 1943	14:03	Il-2	PQ 35 Ost 05461
43	21 July 1943	19:54	Il-2	PQ 35 Ost 54542; 25 km (16 mi) north-northwest of Karachev	89	29 October 1943	14:16	Il-2	PQ 35 Ost 05453, northeast of Orsha
44	23 July 1943	12:34	Il-2	PQ 35 Ost 54398; 40 km (25 mi) west-northwest of Bolkhov	90	4 November 1943	13:17	Yak-9	PQ 25 Ost 97874, south of Nevel; 20 km (12 mi) west of Nevel
45	23 July 1943	12:37	La-5	PQ 35 Ost 54533; 40 km (25 mi) west of Bolkhov	91	4 November 1943	13:22	Il-2	PQ 25 Ost 97883; 10 km (6.2 mi) west of Nevel
46	2 August 1943	16:50	LaGG-3	PQ 35 Ost 54653; 20 km (12 mi) west-southwest of Bolkhov	92	6 November 1943	14:44	Yak-9	PQ 35 Ost 06173
47	2 August 1943	17:00	P-40	PQ 35 Ost 54633; 10 km (6.2 mi) west of Bolkhov	93	10 November 1943	09:16	Yak-9	PQ 25 Ost 96234; 10 km (6.2 mi) south of Nevel
48	3 August 1943	11:45	LaGG-3	PQ 35 Ost 54723; 10 km (6.2 mi) northeast of Woronowo	94	11 November 1943	10:38	Il-2	PQ 35 Ost 06723
49	4 August 1943	15:31	Il-2	PQ 35 Ost 44862 vicinity of Karachev	95	11 November 1943	10:42	Il-2	PQ 35 Ost 06762

=== Awards ===
- Iron Cross (1939)
  - 2nd Class (March 1942)
  - 1st Class (3 February 1943)
- Honor Goblet of the Luftwaffe on 13 September 1943 as Oberfeldwebel and pilot
- German Cross in Gold on 31 August 1943 as Oberfeldwebel in the I./Jagdgeschwader 54
- Knight's Cross of the Iron Cross on 26 March 1944 as Oberfeldwebel and pilot in the 3./Jagdgeschwader 54 (Note: According to Scherzer as pilot in the 1./Jagdgeschwader 54.)
