= Von Bonin =

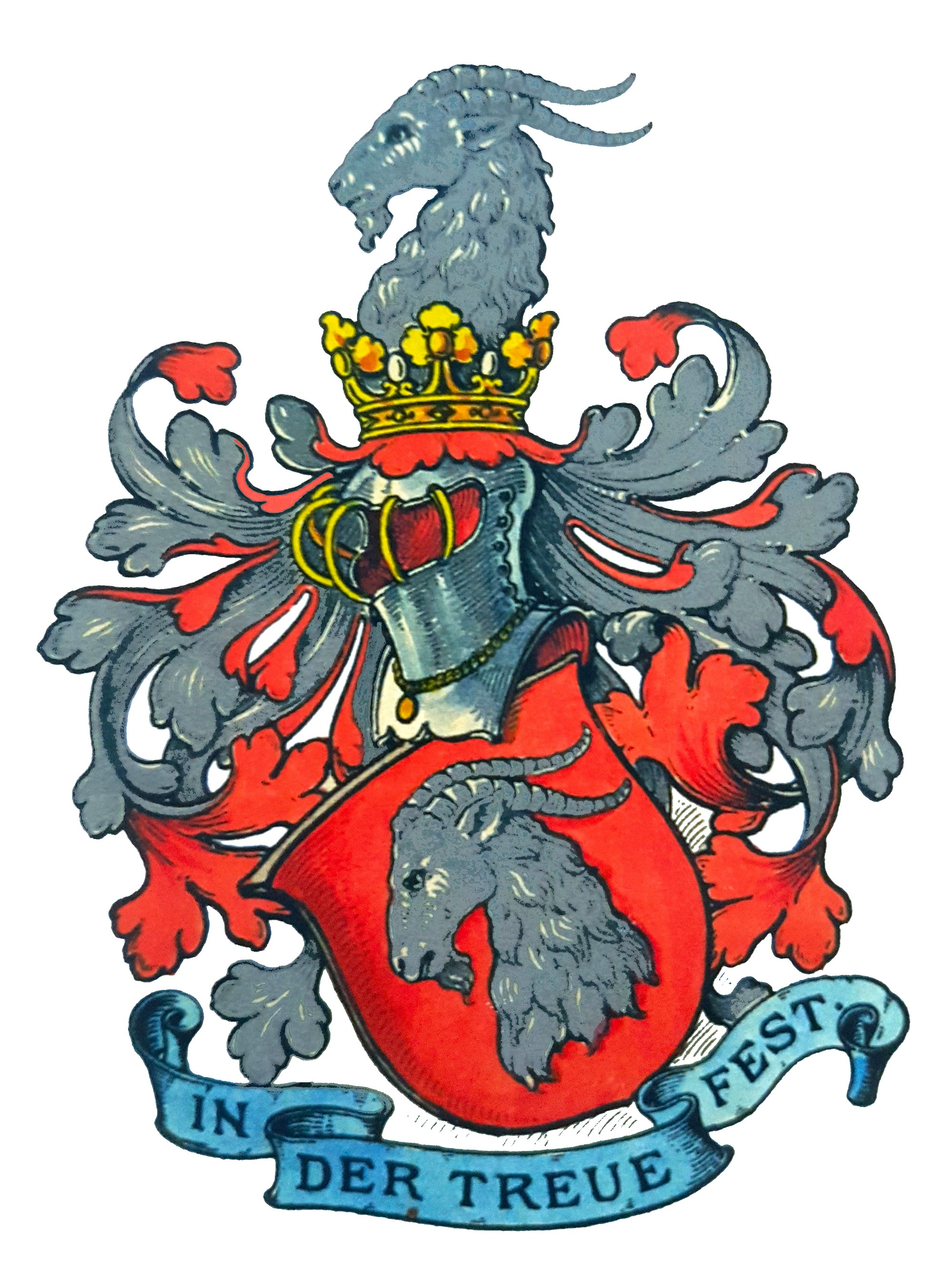
Coat of arms of the Bonin family

The Bonin/Borin family or von Bonin/von Borin is an old Prussian noble family of Polish origin, whose members held significant military posts in the Kingdom of Prussia and later within the German Empire.

== Notable members ==
- Albert Ferdinand Adolf Karl Friedrich von Bonin (1803–1872), German Corps commander
- Bogislaw von Bonin (1908–1980), German Wehrmacht officer and journalist
- Cosima von Bonin (born 1962), German contemporary artist
- Dietrich-Siegwart von Bonin
- Eckart-Wilhelm von Bonin (1919–1992), German World War II night fighter ace
- Eduard von Bonin (1793–1865), Prussian general who served as Prussian Minister of War
- Hubertus von Bonin (1911–1943), German World War II fighter ace
- Kasimir Wedig von Bonin (1691–1752), Prussian lieutenant general
- Gerhardt von Bonin (1890–1979), neuroscientist & co-author of the classic text "The Isocortex of Man" (1951)
- Wibke von Bonin (born 1936), German art historian and broadcaster

== See also ==
- Bonin (surname)
