= Walter Ehle =

German fighter ace and Knight's Cross recipient

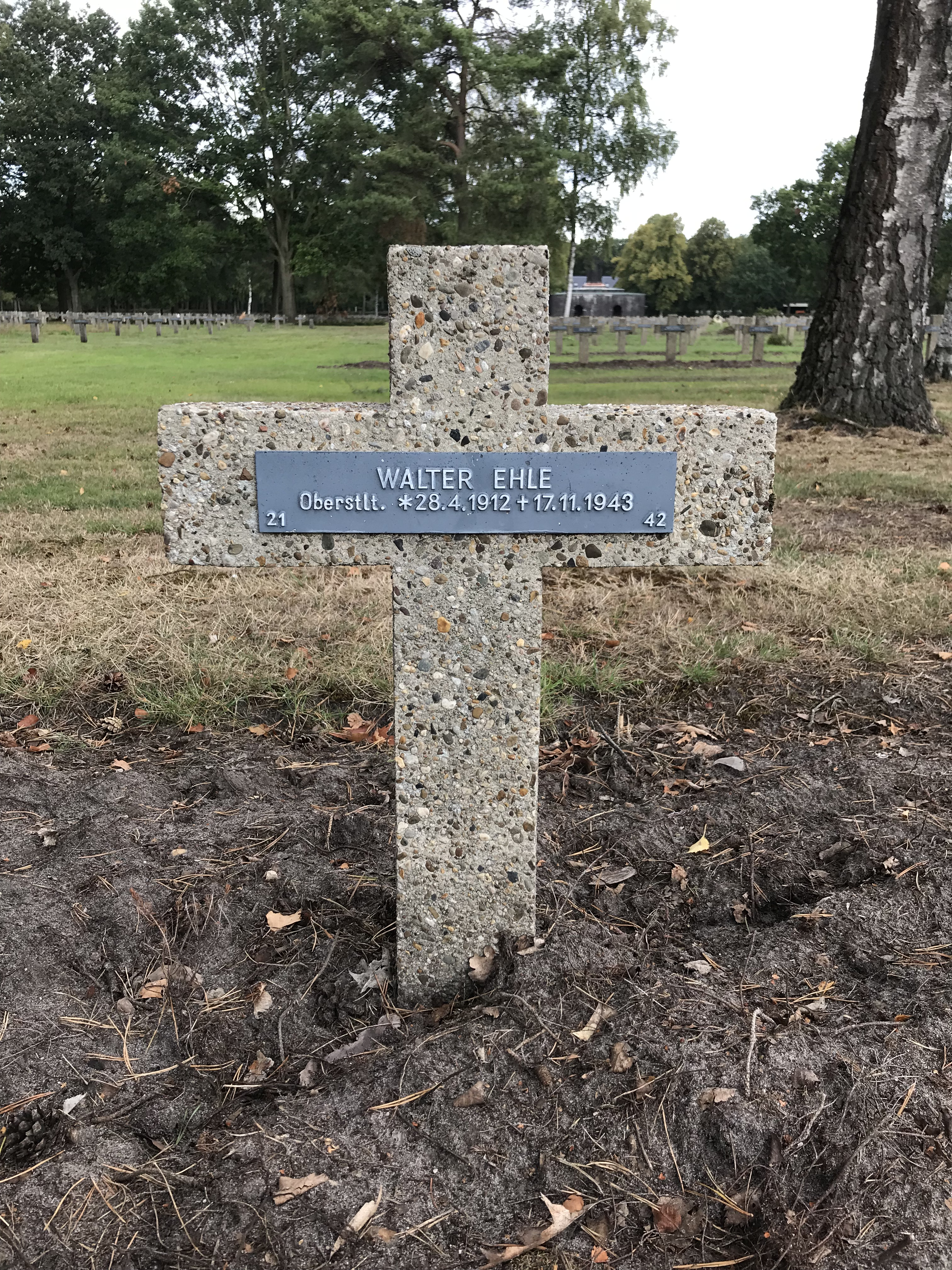
- Grave 21-42
- Born: 28 April 1913; Windhuk, German South West Africa
- Died: 18 November 1943 (aged 30); St. Trond, German-occupied Belgium
- Burial place: Lommel, Belgium
- Military career
- Allegiance: Nazi Germany
- Branch: Luftwaffe
- Service years: 1935–1943
- Rank: Major (major)
- Units: Condor Legion; ZG 1 NJG 1
- Commands: II./ NJG 1
- Conflicts: See battles Spanish Civil War World War II; Land campaigns: Invasion of Poland; Battle of France; Air campaigns: European air campaign; Battle of Britain; Defense of the Reich †

Walter Ehle (28 April 1913 – 18 November 1943) was a Luftwaffe night fighter ace and recipient of the Knight's Cross of the Iron Cross during World War II. The Knight's Cross of the Iron Cross, and its variants were the highest awards in the military and paramilitary forces of Nazi Germany during World War II. Walter Ehle claimed 39 aerial victories, 35 of them at night. (Note: For a list of Luftwaffe night fighter aces see List of German World War II night fighter aces.)

== Early life and career ==
Ehle was born on 28 April 1913 in Windhuk in German South West Africa, present-day Windhoek is the capital and largest city of the Republic of Namibia.

== World War II ==
At the start of the war Ehle flew with 3./ZG 1 and was credited with three daylight kills before the unit was redesignated 3./Nachtjagdgeschwader 1 (NJG 1) and he became a night fighter.

=== Night fighter career ===
A map of part of the Kammhuber Line. The 'belt' and night fighter 'boxes' are shown.

Following the 1939 aerial Battle of the Heligoland Bight, RAF attacks shifted to the cover of darkness, initiating the Defence of the Reich campaign. By mid-1940, Generalmajor (Brigadier General) Josef Kammhuber had established a night air defense system dubbed the Kammhuber Line. It consisted of a series of control sectors equipped with radars and searchlights and an associated night fighter. Each sector named a Himmelbett (canopy bed) would direct the night fighter into visual range with target bombers. In 1941, the Luftwaffe started equipping night fighters with airborne radar such as the Lichtenstein radar. This airborne radar did not come into general use until early 1942.

=== Group commander ===
Ehle was appointed Gruppenkommandeur (group commander) of II. Gruppe of NJG 1 on 6 October 1940, succeeding Hauptmann Heinrich Graf von Stillfried und Rattonitz. His sixth night victory was a Bristol Blenheim shot down on 2 June 1942, and he had 16 victories in total by the end of 1942.

On 18 November 1943 Walter Ehle's Messerschmitt Bf 110 crashed near St. Trond, Belgium. As he was landing his airfield lights were extinguished; his aircraft crashed and he and his crew, Ofw. Leidenbach (Bordfunker—radio/wireless operator) and Uffz. Derlitzky (Bordschütze—aerial gunner), perished. He was succeeded by Major Eckart-Wilhelm von Bonin as commander of II. Gruppe of NJG 1.

Major Ehle was awarded the Knight's Cross of the Iron Cross (Ritterkreuz des Eisernen Kreuzes) on 29 August after 31 victories and at the time of his death he was credited with 39. He shot down a total of 38 enemy aircraft of which 35 were at night.

== Summary of career ==
=== Aerial victory claims ===
According to Obermaier, Ehle was credited with 39—four daytime and 35 nighttime—aerial victories. Foreman, Parry and Mathews, authors of Luftwaffe Night Fighter Claims 1939 – 1945, researched the German Federal Archives and found records for 34 nocturnal victory claims. Mathews and Foreman also published Luftwaffe Aces — Biographies and Victory Claims, listing Ehle with 34 claims, including three as a Zerstörer pilot, plus three further unconfirmed claims.

Chronicle of aerial victories
This and the ♠ (Ace of spades) indicates those aerial victories which made Ehle an "ace-in-a-day", a term which designates a fighter pilot who has shot down five or more airplanes in a single day. This and the – (dash) indicates unwitnessed aerial victory claims for which Ehle did not receive credit. This and the ? (question mark) indicates information discrepancies listed in Luftwaffe Night Fighter Claims 1939 – 1945 and in Luftwaffe Aces — Biographies and Victory Claims.
Claim (total)	Claim (nocturnal)	Date	Time	Type	Location	Serial No./Squadron No.
– 3. Staffel of Zerstörergeschwader 1 –
1		6 September 1939	05:15	PZL P.11	Warsaw	
2		8 September 1939	—	PZL.37 Łoś	Radzymin	
3		1 June 1940	—	Spitfire	vicinity of Dunkirk	
– 3. Staffel of Nachtjagdgeschwader 1 –
4	1	21 July 1940	01:38	Wellington	12 km (7.5 mi) northwest of Munster	
– Stab II. Gruppe of Nachtjagdgeschwader 1 –
5	2	9 February 1941	23:35	Wellington	15 km (9.3 mi) west of Nunspeet	Wellington T2702/No. 15 Squadron RAF
6	3	11 May 1941	00:57	Wellington	5 km (3.1 mi) west of Westerhever	
7	4	30 June 1941	01:52	Wellington	40 km (25 mi) northeast of Bremen	
8	5	30 June 1941	02:45	Stirling	2 km (1.2 mi) northwest of Ellerbeck	
9	6	2 June 1942	02:34	Blenheim	north-northeast of Brussels	Wellington DV763/No. 16 Operational Training Unit
10	7	7 August 1942	02:40	Halifax	2 km (1.2 mi) southwest of Gruitrode	
11	8	12 August 1942	03:12	Wellington	northwest of Leuven	
12	9	28 August 1942	23:02	Wellington	east of Wihogne	
13	10	28 August 1942	23:51	Wellington	northeast of Liège	
14	11	29 August 1942	02:52	Wellington	Grez-Doiceau	
15	12	2 September 1942	04:13	Stirling	Nossegem (incorrectly spelled "Osseghem" in the reference book)	Stirling N3714/No. 218 (Gold Coast) Squadron RAF
16	13	3 September 1942	01:59	Lancaster	22 km (14 mi) southwest of Liège	
17	14	7 September 1942	04:55	Wellington	7 km (4.3 mi) south of Tilburg	
18	15	17 September 1942	01:08	Stirling	south of Tirlemont	
19	16	11 April 1943	03:45	Stirling	1 km (0.62 mi) south of Tongerlo	Stirling BK760/No. 7 Squadron RAF
20	17	13 May 1943	02:44	Lancaster	3 km (1.9 mi) north of Roermond	
21♠	18	26 May 1943	01:51	Halifax	1 km (0.62 mi) south of Jülich	Halifax JB837/No. 77 Squadron RAF
22♠	19	26 May 1943	01:52	Stirling	2 km (1.2 mi) south of Jülich	Stirling EF361/No. 7 Squadron RAF
23♠	20	26 May 1943	01:52	Stirling	6 km (3.7 mi) south of Jülich	Stirling BF534/No. 15 Squadron RAF
24♠	21	26 May 1943	01:55	Stirling	8 km (5.0 mi) south of Jülich	Stirling EH887/No. 218 (Gold Coast) Squadron RAF
25♠	22	26 May 1943	02:35	Wellington	3 km (1.9 mi) north of Nederweert	Wellington HE699/No. 166 Squadron RAF
26	23	30 May 1943	00:37	Halifax	9 km (5.6 mi) southeast of Aachen	
27	24	30 May 1943	01:05	Halifax	6 km (3.7 mi) northeast of Jülich	
28	25	17 June 1943	01:18	Lancaster	south-southwest of Jülich	
29	26	22 June 1943	02:39	Halifax	4 km (2.5 mi) northwest of Bortel	
30	27	29 June 1943	02:33	Stirling	40 km (25 mi) west-southwest of Diest	Stirling EE880/No. 149 Squadron RAF
31	28	28 July 1943	01:26	Lancaster	west-southwest of Bremervörde	
32	29	18 August 1943	01:44	Lancaster	north-northwest of Peenemünde	
33	30	18 August 1943	01:46	Lancaster	north-northwest of Peenemünde	
—	31? (Note: According to Luftwaffe Aces — Biographies and Victory Claims, this claim was unconfirmed while Luftwaffe Night Fighter Claims 1939 – 1945 confirm this claim.)	28 August 1943	02:00	Stirling	northwest of Nuremberg	
34	32	31 August 1943	03:45	Lancaster	Giesenkirchen	
—	33?	3 November 1943	14:25	B-17		
—	34?	3 November 1943	19:40	Lancaster	30 km (19 mi) west-northwest of Cologne	

=== Awards ===
- Aviator badge
- Front Flying Clasp of the Luftwaffe in Gold
- Spanish Cross in Gold with Swords (14 April 1939)
- Iron Cross (1939) 2nd and 1st Class
- German Cross in Gold on 20 October 1942 as Hauptmann in the II./Nachtjagdgeschwader 1 (Note: According to Obermaier on 9 November 1942.)
- Knight's Cross of the Iron Cross on 29 August 1943 as Major and Gruppenkommandeur of the II./Nachtjagdgeschwader 1

== Notes ==
Military offices
Preceded by Hauptmann Heinrich Graf von Stillfried und Rattonitz	Gruppenkommandeur of II. Nachtjagdgeschwader 1; 6 October 1940 – 17 November 1943	Succeeded by Major Eckart-Wilhelm von Bonin
