= Fritz Tegtmeier =

German World War II fighter pilot (1917–1999)

- Fritz Tegtmeier
- Born: 30 July 1917; Sundern, Westphalia
- Died: 8 April 1999 (aged 81); Greven
- Military career
- Allegiance: Nazi Germany
- Branch: Luftwaffe
- Rank: Oberleutnant (first lieutenant)
- Units: JG 54, EJGr Ost, JG 7
- Conflicts: See battles World War II: Operation Barbarossa; Eastern Front
- Awards: Knight's Cross of the Iron Cross

Fritz Tegtmeier (30 July 1917 – 8 April 1999) was a World War II Luftwaffe flying ace who had 146 aerial victories and received the coveted Knight's Cross of the Iron Cross. The Knight's Cross of the Iron Cross, and its variants, were the highest awards in the military and paramilitary forces of Nazi Germany during World War II. A flying ace or fighter ace is a military aviator credited with shooting down five or more enemy aircraft during aerial combat.

== Early life and career ==
Tegtmeier was born on 30 July 1917 in Sundern, now part of Stemwede, then in the Province of Westphalia within the German Empire. He joined the military service of the Luftwaffe and, following flight and fighter pilot training, (Note: Flight training in the Luftwaffe progressed through the levels A1, A2 and B1, B2, referred to as A/B flight training. A training included theoretical and practical training in aerobatics, navigation, long-distance flights and dead-stick landings. The B courses included high-altitude flights, instrument flights, night landings and training to handle the aircraft in difficult situations.) Tegtmeier was posted to the 2. Staffel (2nd squadron) of Jagdgeschwader 54 (JG 54—54th Fighter Wing) in October 1940.

At the time, his Staffel was commanded by Oberleutnant Rudolf Unger and subordinated to I. Gruppe (1st group) of JG 54 headed by Hauptmann Hubertus von Bonin. The Gruppe had just been withdrawn from the English Channel, where it had fought in the Battle of Britain, and was ordered to Jever Airfield for a period of rest and replenishment. The Gruppe was then split up, with 2. Staffel initially based at Westerland Airfield before moving to Wangerooge, where they flew fighter patrols over the German Bight. Here, Tegtmeier was severely injured on 17 November, when his Messerschmitt Bf 109 E-1 (Werknummer 6043—factory number) suffered engine failure, resulting in a crash landing at Jever Airfield.

== World War II ==
On Friday 1 September 1939, German forces invaded Poland, which marked the beginning of World War II. Following his injuries sustained on 17 November 1940, Tegtmeier returned to his Staffel in the spring of 1941.

Operation Barbarossa, the German invasion of the Soviet Union, began on 22 June 1941. This opened up the Eastern Front. In the fortnight prior, JG 54 had been moved to an airfield in Lindenthal near Rautenberg, East Prussia, present-day Uslowoje in Kaliningrad Oblast. Tasked with supporting Army Group North in its advance through the Baltic states towards Leningrad, the unit began combat operations shortly afterwards. In the opening phase of Operation Barbarossa, Tegtmeier claimed his first aerial victory.

On 8 September, I. Gruppe moved to an airfield at Ziverskaya, southwest of Leningrad. There, on 11 September, he was again severely injured in a collision in his Bf 109 F-2, resulting in a crash landing at Ziverskaya. He returned to active duty in April 1942 and was assigned to 1. Staffel of JG 54. By the end of 1942, he had claimed 24 aerial victories.

On 14 January 1943, Tegtmeier became an "ace-in-a-day" for the first time. That day, pilots of I. Gruppe had claimed 30 aerial victories (Luftsiege). He claimed aerial victories number 36 and 37 on 23 January. On 3 May 1943, he claimed numbers 51–53. Tegtmeier was then posted to Ergänzungs-Jagdgruppe Ost (EJGr Ost—Supplementary Fighter Group, East), a specialized training unit for new fighter pilots destined for the Eastern Front, where he served as a fighter pilot instructor. In September 1943, he returned to front line duty, this time with 3. Staffel of JG 54. In November 1943, he achieved his 75th aerial victory. He was awarded the Knight's Cross of the Iron Cross (Ritterkreuz des Eisernen Kreuzes) on 28 March 1944, following his 99th aerial victory. Tegtmeier was promoted to Leutnant (second lieutenant) on 20 April 1944. He claimed his 100th and 101st aerial victories on 3 May 1944. He was the 71st Luftwaffe pilot to achieve the century mark. On 1 September 1944, he was made Staffelkapitän (squadron leader) of 3. Staffel. He succeeded Leutnant Otto Kittel who was transferred. By the end of 1944, his score of aerial victories stood at 139. When he was transferred to Jagdgeschwader 7 for flight training on the Messerschmitt Me 262 jet fighter in March 1945, his score stood at 146 aerial victories. Tegtmeier had been nominated for the Oak Leaves to the Knight's Cross (Ritterkreuz des Eisernen Kreuzes mit Eichenlaub).

== Later life ==
Tegtmeier died on 8 April 1999 at the age of 81 in Greven, Germany.

== Summary of career ==
=== Aerial victory claims ===
According to US historian David T. Zabecki, Tegtmeier was credited with 146 aerial victories. Mathews and Foreman, authors of Luftwaffe Aces — Biographies and Victory Claims, looked through the German Federal Archives and found records for 146 aerial victory claims, all of which were claimed on the Eastern Front.

Victory claims were logged to a map-reference (PQ = Planquadrat), for example "PQ 01852". The Luftwaffe grid map (Jägermeldenetz) covered all of Europe, western Russia and North Africa and was composed of rectangles measuring 15 minutes of latitude by 30 minutes of longitude, an area of about 360 square miles (930 km^{2}). These sectors were then subdivided into 36 smaller units to give a location area 3 km × 4 km (1.9 mi × 2.5 mi) in size.

Chronicle of aerial victories
This and the ♠ (Ace of spades) indicates those aerial victories which made Tegtmeier an "ace-in-a-day", a term which designates a fighter pilot who has shot down five or more airplanes in a single day. This and the ? (question mark) indicates information discrepancies listed by Prien, Stemmer, Rodeike, Bock, Mathews and Foreman.
Claim	Date	Time	Type	Location	Claim	Date	Time	Type	Location
– 2. Staffel of Jagdgeschwader 54 – Operation Barbrossa — 22 June – 5 December 1941
1	23 June 1941? (Note: According to Mathews and Foreman claimed on 3 June 1941.)	10:24	SB-2		5	13 August 1941	15:42	I-18 (MiG-1)	
2	24 June 1941	05:44	SB-2		6	14 August 1941	05:07	I-18 (MiG-1)	
3	24 June 1941	05:48	SB-2		7	3 September 1941	15:50	I-16	1 km (0.62 mi) north of Krasnogvardeysk
4	18 July 1941	13:54	I-18 (MiG-1)		8	15 November 1941	11:20	I-18 (MiG-1)	
– 2. Staffel of Jagdgeschwader 54 – Eastern Front — 1 May 1942 – 3 February 1943
9	10 June 1942	10:20	Pe-2		24	30 December 1942	12:13? (Note: According to Mathews and Foreman claimed at 12:15.)	Pe-2	PQ 01852; 25 km (16 mi) northwest of Shlisselburg
10	22 June 1942	18:45	MiG-3		25	7 January 1943	11:30	LaGG-3	PQ 01762; 20 km (12 mi) north-northeast of Leningrad
11	22 July 1942	10:26	Yak-1		26	12 January 1943	09:35	P-40	PQ 00251; 15 km (9.3 mi) west-southwest of Shlisselburg
12	23 July 1942	09:30	MiG-3		27	12 January 1943	14:22	Il-2	PQ 10184 east of Mga
13	1 August 1942	16:40	LaGG-3	PQ 00172; 10 km (6.2 mi) north of Selo	28♠	14 January 1943	09:02	La-5	PQ 10181 east of Mga
14	5 August 1942	15:10	MiG-3	PQ 20542; 45 km (28 mi) east of Lyuban	29♠	14 January 1943	09:05	La-5	PQ 10193 east of Mga
15	5 August 1942	15:13	MiG-3	PQ 20593; 45 km (28 mi) northeast of Chudovo	30♠	14 January 1943	09:10	Il-2	PQ 00292; 10 km (6.2 mi) west of Mga
16	7 August 1942	13:30	P-40	PQ 20731; 45 km (28 mi) east-northeast of Chudovo	31♠	14 January 1943	14:30	Il-2	PQ 00294; 10 km (6.2 mi) west of Mga
17	11 August 1942	14:23? (Note: According to Mathews and Foreman claimed at 14:25.)	Il-2	PQ 28311; 20 km (12 mi) east-northeast of Demyansk	32♠	14 January 1943	14:33? (Note: According to Mathews and Foreman claimed at 14:32.)	Il-2	PQ 00274; 10 km (6.2 mi) west of Mga
18	20 August 1942	06:20	Yak-1	PQ 47662; 15 km (9.3 mi) south of Staritsa	33	16 January 1943	09:35	Il-2	PQ 10142 south of Shlisselburg
19	25 August 1942	14:20	Yak-1	PQ 36573; 25 km (16 mi) south-southeast of Gagarin	34	16 January 1943	09:43	Yak-1	PQ 10311; 10 km (6.2 mi) south of Mga
20	26 August 1942	13:30	R-5	PQ 47864; 20 km (12 mi) east-southeast of Zubtsov	35	22 January 1943	08:46	Yak-1	PQ 10212; 45 km (28 mi) west of Volkhov
21	5 September 1942	12:40	Yak-1	PQ 10841 southeast of Shlisselburg	36	23 January 1943	13:05	Yak-1	PQ 10191 east of Mga
22	5 September 1942	12:45	Yak-1	PQ 10954 southeast of Shlisselburg	37	23 January 1943	13:38	Il-2	PQ 00411; 10 km (6.2 mi) east of Pushkin
23	11 September 1942	16:35	I-16	PQ 00223; 20 km (12 mi) west of Shlisselburg	38	24 January 1943	13:35	La-5	PQ 10143 south of Shlisselburg
– 2. Staffel of Jagdgeschwader 54 – Eastern Front — 4 February – March 1943
39	10 February 1943	11:15	Il-2	PQ 36 Ost 10142 south of Shlisselburg	42	21 February 1943	13:00	La-5	PQ 36 Ost 00412; 10 km (6.2 mi) east of Pushkin
40	17 February 1943	12:05	Yak-1	PQ 36 Ost 00281; 20 km (12 mi) west of Mga	43	23 February 1943	07:05	Il-2	PQ 36 Ost 00412; 10 km (6.2 mi) east of Pushkin
41	21 February 1943	10:50	LaGG-3	PQ 36 Ost 00442; 10 km (6.2 mi) southeast of Slutsk	44	23 February 1943	07:10	Il-2	PQ 36 Ost 00283; 20 km (12 mi) west of Mga
– 1. Staffel of Jagdgeschwader 54 – Eastern Front — April – 31 December 1943
? (Note: This claim is not listed by Prien, Stemmer, Rodeike and Bock.)	3 March 1943	11:10	I-16	20 km (12 mi) east of Leningrad	61	5 October 1943	13:21	LaGG-3	PQ 35 Ost 02682
45	3 April 1943	12:45	Yak-1? (Note: According to Mathews and Foreman claimed as a Mikoyan-Gurevich MiG-1.)	PQ 36 Ost 00421; Pushkin-Mga	62	9 October 1943	07:20	P-39	PQ 35 Ost 07772; 10 km (6.2 mi) east of Nevel
?	10 April 1943	11:50	Yak-1	10 km (6.2 mi) south of Lomonosov	63	14 October 1943	08:15	LaGG-3	PQ 35 Ost 15512, southeast of Bajewo; 20 km (12 mi) north-northeast of Krassnyj
46? (Note: This claim is not listed by Mathews and Foreman.)	11 April 1943	18:25	Il-2	3 km (1.9 mi) south of Leningrad	64	20 October 1943	11:35	Il-2	PQ 35 Ost 06312
47	13 April 1943	17:57? (Note: According to Mathews and Foreman claimed at 15:57.)	Pe-2	PQ 36 Ost 00163; 10 km (6.2 mi) southeast of Leningrad	65	21 October 1943	10:45	LaGG-3	PQ 35 Ost 02232
48	2 May 1943	19:05	Il-2	PQ 36 Ost 00463; 10 km (6.2 mi) north of Tosno	66	21 October 1943	10:50	LaGG-3	PQ 35 Ost 02233, east of Lojew
49	2 May 1943	19:07	Il-2	PQ 36 Ost 00273; 10 km (6.2 mi) west of Mga	67	22 October 1943	08:20	La-5	PQ 35 Ost 15332; 15 km (9.3 mi) north of Krassnyj
50	3 May 1943	17:45	La-5	PQ 26 Ost 90252; 15 km (9.3 mi) west-southwest of Shlisselburg	68	22 October 1943	10:40	La-5	PQ 35 Ost 05282 east of Kshischtschew
51	14 September 1943	11:52? (Note: According to Mathews and Foreman claimed at 11:51.)	Yak-9	PQ 35 Ost 26231; 25 km (16 mi) northeast of Moschna	69	27 October 1943	09:15	La-5	PQ 35 Ost 15342; 20 km (12 mi) west of Krassnyj
52	14 September 1943	16:30	La-5	PQ 35 Ost 25663; 25 km (16 mi) east of Schatalowka	70	28 October 1943	12:45	Boston	PQ 35 Ost 03823
53	15 September 1943	08:50	Yak-9	PQ 35 Ost 26732; 10 km (6.2 mi) northeast of Moschna	71	28 October 1943	12:47	Boston	PQ 35 Ost 03824
54	15 September 1943	14:00? (Note: According to Mathews and Foreman claimed at 14:10.)	Yak-9	PQ 35 Ost 35492; 15 km (9.3 mi) west of Yelnya	72	28 October 1943	12:50	Boston	PQ 35 Ost 03864
55	15 September 1943	14:15	Il-2	PQ 35 Ost 35531; 20 km (12 mi) southeast of Yelnya	73	28 October 1943	12:53	Pe-2	PQ 35 Ost 03893
56	17 September 1943	11:00	La-5	PQ 35 Ost 35321; 20 km (12 mi) west of Yelnya	74	6 November 1943	09:50	Yak-9	PQ 35 Ost 06154
57	22 September 1943	17:38	Yak-9	PQ 35 Ost 12742	75	6 November 1943	09:55	LaGG-3	PQ 35 Ost 06163, Lake Ssennitza
58	22 September 1943	17:40	Yak-9	PQ 35 Ost 12721	76?	17 November 1943	07:50	LaGG-3	
59	26 September 1943	12:20	Yak-9	PQ 35 Ost 25532; 10 km (6.2 mi) north of Schatalowka	77	8 December 1943	14:00	LaGG-3	PQ 35 Ost 06384
60	5 October 1943	13:20	LaGG-3	PQ 35 Ost 02682					
– 1. Staffel of Jagdgeschwader 54 – Eastern Front — 1 January – September 1944
78	3 February 1944	14:15	Il-2		101	26 May 1944	18:50	La-5	Baltic Sea, 25 km (16 mi) north-northwest of Hungerburg
79	3 February 1944	14:17	Il-2		102	15 June 1944	07:37	Il-2	
80	7 February 1944	07:37	La-5		103	16 June 1944	19:00	Yak-9	
81	7 February 1944	10:36	La-5		104	16 June 1944	19:00	Yak-9	
82	7 February 1944	10:37	La-5		105	14 July 1944	17:58	Yak-9	
83	7 February 1944	11:05	La-5		106	16 July 1944	08:35	Yak-9	
84	7 February 1944	11:07	La-5		107	16 July 1944	08:40	P-39	
85	12 February 1944	14:30	La-5		108	21 July 1944	09:20	Yak-9	
86	16 February 1944	14:10	Yak-9	40 km (25 mi) southwest of Narva	109	21 July 1944	09:25	Yak-9	
87	24 February 1944	11:00	Yak-9	25 km (16 mi) southwest of Narva	110	22 July 1944	15:55	La-5	
88	25 February 1944	11:10	Il-2	30 km (19 mi) southwest of Narva	111	22 July 1944	19:15	LaGG-3	
89	6 March 1944	07:55	La-5	25 km (16 mi) south of Narva	112	27 July 1944	15:55	Pe-2	
90	6 March 1944	08:05	Yak-9	southwest of Narva	113	28 July 1944	15:15	Yak-9	
91	7 March 1944	12:36	La-5	30 km (19 mi) west-southwest of Narva	114	1 August 1944	12:17	La-5	
92	8 March 1944	15:46	Il-2	Baltic Sea, 30 km (19 mi) northeast of Kunda	115	6 August 1944	18:39	Yak-9	
93	8 March 1944	16:10	Il-2	Baltic Sea, 45 km (28 mi) northeast of Kunda	116	7 August 1944	13:43	P-39	
94	8 March 1944	16:23	Yak-9	Baltic Sea, 45 km (28 mi) northeast of Kunda	117	7 August 1944	18:20	La-5	
95	9 March 1944	09:08	La-5	southwest of Narva	118	7 August 1944	18:24	La-5	
96	23 March 1944	15:35	Il-2		119	16 August 1944	10:45	La-5	
97	1 April 1944	10:12	LaGG-3	25 km (16 mi) southeast of Pskov	120	25 August 1944	09:23	Pe-2	
98	2 April 1944	15:25	La-5	northeast of Kunda	121	27 August 1944	15:05	Yak-9	
99	4 April 1944	08:19	La-5	northeast of Kunda	122	27 August 1944	15:10	Pe-2	
100	20 May 1944	12:31	Yak-1	Baltic Sea, 20 km (12 mi) north-northwest of Hungerburg	123	29 August 1944	18:30	La-5	
– 3. Staffel of Jagdgeschwader 54 – Eastern Front — September – October 1944
124♠	14 September 1944	10:00	Yak-9	35 km (22 mi) northwest of Kreuzburg	132	17 September 1944	13:22	Yak-9	25 km (16 mi) northwest of Pasewalk
125♠	14 September 1944	12:00	P-39	45 km (28 mi) northeast of Pasewalk	133	20 September 1944	11:13	Yak-9	45 km (28 mi) south of Riga
126♠	14 September 1944	12:03	P-39	45 km (28 mi) northeast of Pasewalk	134	10 October 1944	09:07	La-5	10 km (6.2 mi) east of Riga
127♠	14 September 1944	12:04	Yak-9	45 km (28 mi) northeast of Pasewalk	135	12 October 1944	12:25	Il-2	10 km (6.2 mi) southeast of Riga
128♠	14 September 1944	12:10	Il-2	45 km (28 mi) northeast of Pasewalk	136	12 October 1944	16:05	Pe-2	10 km (6.2 mi) north of Riga
129♠	14 September 1944	16:40	Pe-2	10 km (6.2 mi) south of Riga	137	12 October 1944	16:07	Pe-2	10 km (6.2 mi) northeast of Riga
130	15 September 1944	09:33	Il-2	50 km (31 mi) north-northwest of Kreuzburg	138	29 October 1944	19:56	Il-2	60 km (37 mi) northeast of Telsche
131	17 September 1944	12:40	Yak-9	40 km (25 mi) south-southeast of Riga	139	30 October 1944	11:35	Pe-2	40 km (25 mi) east of Libau
According to Mathews and Foreman, aerial victories 140 to 146 were not documented.

=== Awards ===
- Iron Cross (1939) 2nd and 1st Class
- Honour Goblet of the Luftwaffe (5 October 1942)
- German Cross in Gold on 23 January 1943 as Oberfeldwebel in the I./Jagdgeschwader 54
- Knight's Cross of the Iron Cross on 28 March 1944 as Oberfeldwebel and pilot in the 2./Jagdgeschwader 54 (Note: According to Scherzer on 26 March 1944 as pilot in the 1./Jagdgeschwader 54.)
