= Krasov =

- Municipality
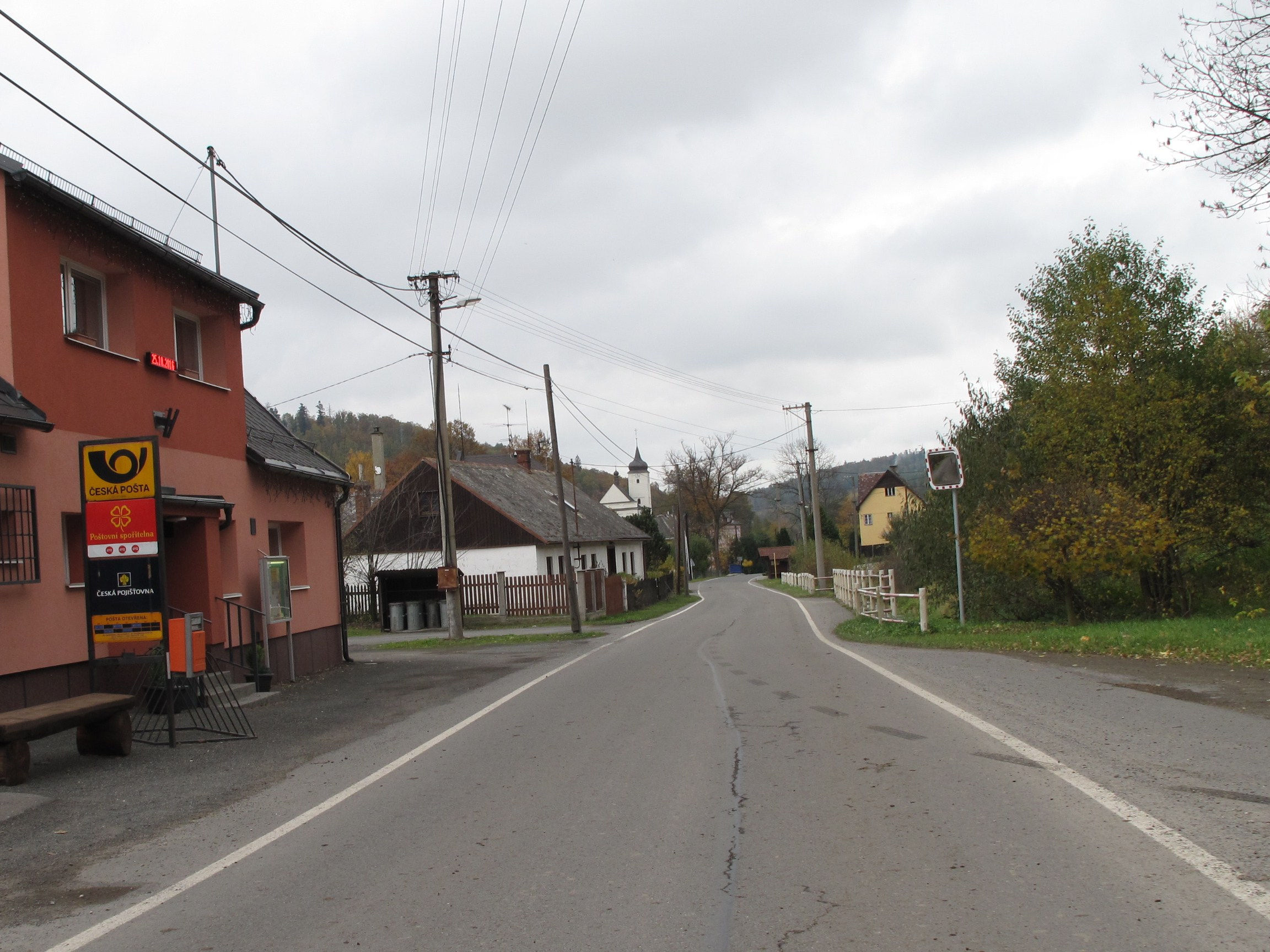
- Main street

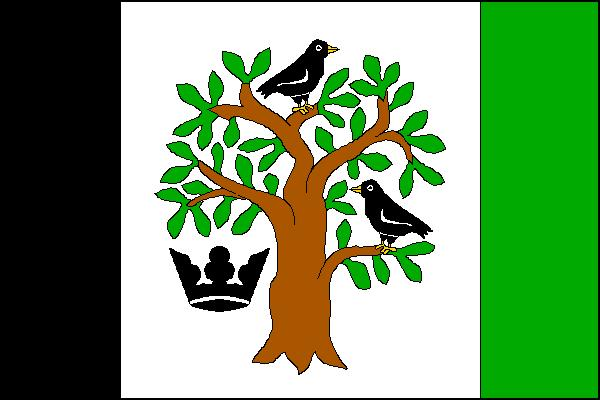
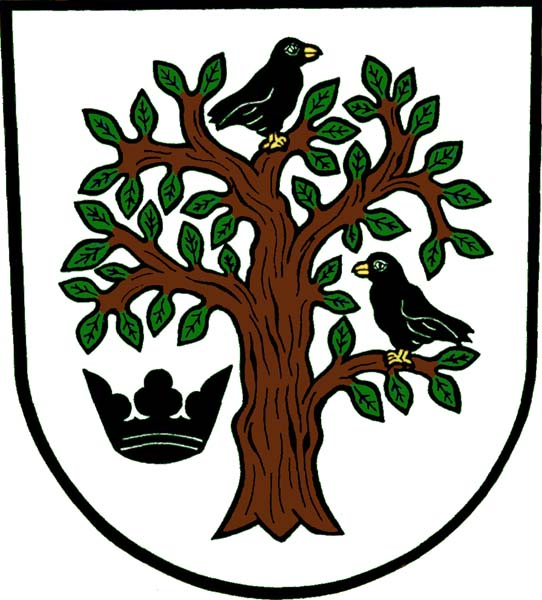
- Flag Coat of arms

- Location in the Czech Republic
- Coordinates: 50°5′30″N 17°32′46″E
- Country: Czech Republic
- Region: Moravian-Silesian
- District: Bruntál
- First mentioned: 1502

Area
  - Total: 25.79 km^{2} (9.96 sq mi)
- Elevation: 470 m (1,540 ft)

Population (2026-01-01)
  - Total: 351
  - Density: 13.6/km^{2} (35.2/sq mi)
- Time zone: UTC+1 (CET)
  - Summer (DST): UTC+2 (CEST)
- Postal code: 793 94
- Website: www.obec-krasov.eu

Krasov (until 1945 Korunov; German: Kronsdorf) is a municipality and village in Bruntál District in the Moravian-Silesian Region of the Czech Republic. It has about 400 inhabitants.

== History ==
The first written mention of Krasov is from 1502. The village was probably founded in 1450.

== Demographics ==
Historical population
Year	Pop.	±%
1869	1,137	—
1880	1,158	+1.8%
1890	1,143	−1.3%
1900	1,118	−2.2%
1910	1,056	−5.5%
1921	1,001	−5.2%
1930	984	−1.7%
1950	469	−52.3%
1961	521	+11.1%
1970	430	−17.5%
1980	321	−25.3%
1991	291	−9.3%
2001	347	+19.2%
2011	334	−3.7%
2021	344	+3.0%
Source: Censuses

== Notable people ==
- Otto Kittel (1917–1945), German fighter pilot
