= List of protected heritage sites in Juprelle =

This table shows an overview of the protected heritage sites in the Walloon town Juprelle. This list is part of Belgium's national heritage.

Object	Year/architect	Town/section	Address	Coordinates	Number^{?}	Image
Castle Voroux-lez-Liers and surrounding area ^{(nl)} ^{(fr)}		Juprelle	Rue Provinciale	50.688315°N 5.556194°E	62060-CLT-0003-01 Info	
Organs of the church of Saint-Remacle ^{(nl)} ^{(fr)}		Juprelle	Rue du Premier de Ligne	50.722017°N 5.571117°E	62060-CLT-0005-01 Info	Orgels van de kerk Saint-Remacle
Malaxhe farmhouse and chapel gable of the entrance portal ^{(nl)} ^{(fr)}		Juprelle	Rue de la Juprelle n° 730	50.707918°N 5.514282°E	62060-CLT-0006-01 Info	Boerderij van Malaxhe: huis en de kapel en puntgevel van het entreeportaal
Church of Saint-Servais ^{(nl)} ^{(fr)}		Juprelle	Rue du Curvé Verdin/Rue Joseph Martin	50.688163°N 5.523849°E	62060-CLT-0007-01 Info	Kerk Saint-Servais

== See also ==
- List of protected heritage sites in Liège (province)
- Juprelle
