= Otto Kittel =

German fighter pilot (1917–1945)

- Kittel as Oberfeldwebel
- Born: 21 February 1917; Kronsdorf, Sudetenland, Austria-Hungary
- Died: 14 or 16 February 1945 (aged 27); Džūkste, Latvian SSR, Soviet Union
- Cause of death: Killed in action
- Military career
- Allegiance: Nazi Germany
- Branch: Luftwaffe
- Service years: 1939–1945
- Rank: Oberleutnant (first lieutenant)
- Unit: JG 54
- Commands: 3./JG 54, 2./JG 54, I./JG 54; EJGr Ost
- Conflicts: See battles World War II: Eastern Front; Operation Barbarossa; Baltic Sea Campaigns; Siege of Leningrad; Demyansk Pocket; Battle of Kursk; Operation Kutuzov; Tallinn Offensive; Courland Pocket †
- Awards: Knight's Cross of the Iron Cross with Oak Leaves and Swords

Otto Kittel (21 February 1917 – 14 or 16 February 1945) was an Austrian-born German fighter pilot during World War II. He flew 583 combat missions on the Eastern Front, claiming 267 aerial victories, making him the fourth-highest scoring ace in aviation history according to authors John Weal and Jerry Scutts. Kittel claimed all of his victories against the Red Air Force.

Kittel joined the Luftwaffe in 1939, and, in spring 1941, he was posted to Jagdgeschwader 54 (JG 54—54th Fighter Wing) supporting Army Group North on the Eastern Front. He received the Knight's Cross of the Iron Cross on 29 October 1943, for reaching 120 aerial victories. During the remainder of World War II, Kittel was credited with 144 more aerial victories and was awarded the Knight's Cross of the Iron Cross with Oak Leaves and Swords. He was shot down by Soviet aircraft and killed in February 1945. Kittel was the most successful German fighter pilot to be killed in action.

== Personal life ==
Kittel was born on 21 February 1917 in Kronsdorf in Sudeten Silesia, Austria-Hungary, present-day Krasov. He was the son of Eduard Kittel, a farmer. After working briefly as an auto mechanic, Kittel joined the Luftwaffe in 1939. Following completion of flight and fighter pilot training, (Note: Flight training in the Luftwaffe progressed through the levels A1, A2 and B1, B2, referred to as A/B flight training. A training included theoretical and practical training in aerobatics, navigation, long-distance flights and dead-stick landings. The B courses included high-altitude flights, instrument flights, night landings and training to handle the aircraft in difficult situations.) he was posted to 2. Staffel (2nd squadron) of Jagdgeschwader 54 (JG 54—54th Fighter Wing) on 12 February 1941. Kittel married his fiancé, Edith, in June 1942; the couple had a son, born in 1942.

== World War II ==
World War II in Europe had begun on Friday 1 September 1939, when German forces invaded Poland. At the time of Kittel's posting to 2. Staffel in early 1941, the squadron was commanded by Oberleutnant Rudolf Unger and subordinated to I. Gruppe (1st group) of JG 54 headed by Hauptmann Hubertus von Bonin. The Gruppe was based at Groningen Airfield in the Netherlands where they patrolled the German Bight. Unlike the other elements of JG 54, I. Gruppe did not participate in the German invasion of Yugoslavia and stayed in Groningen until 9 May when they relocated to Jever Airfield in northern Germany. On 31 May, due to technical problems with his Messerschmitt Bf 109 F-2 (Werknummer 12725—factory number) Kittel was forced to bail out near Spiekeroog. On 14 June, the Gruppe was withdrawn and began preparations for the German invasion of the Soviet Union.

=== War against the Soviet Union ===
Operation Barbarossa, the German invasion of the Soviet Union, began on 22 June 1941. In the fortnight prior, JG 54 had been moved to an airfield in Lindenthal near Rautenberg, East Prussia, present-day Uslowoje in Kaliningrad Oblast. Tasked with supporting Army Group North in its advance through the Baltic states towards Leningrad, the unit began combat operations shortly afterwards. On 24 June 1941, Kittel claimed his first two aerial victories, two Tupolev SB-2 bombers. His tally had risen to 19 by May 1942.

In mid-December 1942, I. Gruppe began converting to the Focke-Wulf Fw 190 A-4 radial engine powered fighter. The conversion training took place at Heiligenbeil, present-day Mamonovo, before returning to Krasnogvardeysk, present-day Gatchina. On 12 January 1943, Soviet forces launched Operation Iskra fought south of Lake Ladoga and aimed to break the Wehrmacht's siege of Leningrad. The Soviet operation was supported by bomber, ground-attack and fighter aircraft. That day, I. Gruppe pilots claimed 36 aerial victories, including Kittel's first "ace-in-a-day" achievement when he shot down six Soviet aircraft on two separate combat missions. On 19 February, Kittel claimed his 39th aerial victory which was also JG 54's 4,000th claim in total. On 15 March 1943, Kittel's Fw 190 A-4 (Werknummer 2481) suffered engine failure resulting in a forced landing behind enemy lines. He managed to return to his unit on foot.

During the fighting in 1943, JG 54 took part in the spring battles over the Crimea Peninsula, Vyazma-Bryansk, Vitebsk, Kharkov, Orsha and Orel regions. During the Battle of Kursk, Kittel's unit escorted Junkers Ju 87 Stukas of a dive bomber wing commanded by Hans-Ulrich Rudel. On 14 September 1943, Kittel claimed his 100th aerial victory, a Yakovlev Yak-9 fighter. The 53rd Luftwaffe pilot to achieve the century mark, he received the Knight's Cross of the Iron Cross (Ritterkreuz des Eisernen Kreuzes) on 29 October 1943. The presentation was made after the 123rd aerial victory at Vitebsk. On 1 November 1943, Kittel was promoted to the rank of Leutnant (second lieutenant). Kittel was then posted to Ergänzungs-Jagdgruppe Ost, a supplementary training unit for fighter pilots destined for the Eastern Front, as an instructor. At the time, the unit was commanded by Major Viktor Bauer and was based at Saint-Jean-d'Angély, France.

=== Squadron leader ===
On 9 February 1944, Kittel was appointed Staffelkapitän (squadron leader) of 3. Staffel of JG 54. He succeeded Leutnant Günther Haase who had been killed in a flying accident on 30 January. At the time, I. Gruppe of JG 54 to which 3. Staffel was subordinated was based at Orsha. On 14 February, I. Gruppe moved to an airfield named Wesenberg near Rakvere, located approximately 60 kilometers (37 miles) north of Lake Peipus and 105 kilometers (65 miles) west of Narva. Here the Gruppe was subordinated to the 3. Flieger-Division (3rd Air Division) and fought in the Battle of Narva.

On 4 April 1944, Kittel claimed his 150th aerial victory. Shortly before 08:00, I. Gruppe was scrambled at Wesenberg and intercepted a flight of Ilyushin Il-2 ground-attack aircraft and their fighter escort over sea off Kunda. In this aerial encounter which was fought for 20 minutes, I. Gruppe pilots claimed thirteen aerial victories, four Il-2s and nine fighter aircraft, including five claims by Kittel, taking his total to 151. On 11 April, he was awarded the Knight's Cross of the Iron Cross with Oak Leaves (Ritterkreuz des Eisernen Kreuzes mit Eichenlaub) for his 152nd aerial victory, the 449th soldier to receive this distinction. Kittel received the Oak Leaves from Adolf Hitler at the Berghof on 5 May 1944. Also present at the ceremony were Anton Hafner, Alfred Grislawski, Günther Schack, Emil Lang, Erich Rudorffer, Martin Möbus, Wilhelm Herget, Hans-Karl Stepp, Rudolf Schoenert, Günther Radusch, Otto Pollmann and Fritz Breithaupt, who all received the Oak Leaves on this date.

On 2 August, I. Gruppe moved to an airfield at Šķirotava, located approximately 10 kilometers (6.2 miles) southeast of Riga. Flying from Šķirotava, Kittel claimed his 200th aerial victory on 26 August. On 29 May 1944, 2. Staffel of I. Gruppe had been detached and subordinated to III. Gruppe of JG 54 which was fighting on the Western Front in defense of the Reich over Germany. In consequence, on 1 September 1944 a new 2. Staffel was formed and placed under the command of Kittel. Command of 3. Staffel was then given to Leutnant Fritz Tegtmeier. In October, Hauptmann Franz Eisenach, the Gruppenkommandeur (group commander) of I. Gruppe was given home leave. In consequence, Kittel temporarily led the Gruppe during his absence. Kittel was awarded the Knight's Cross of the Iron Cross with Oak Leaves and Swords (Ritterkreuz des Eisernen Kreuzes mit Eichenlaub und Schwertern) on 25 November 1944.

On 16 February 1945, Kittel was shot down in his Fw 190 A-8 (Werknummer 960282) southwest of Tukums over the Courland Pocket. He was hit by return fire from an Il-2 ground attack aircraft. His wingman later reported that his aircraft was hit, descended towards the ground on fire and crashed in flames. The site of the crash is believed to have been 6 kilometers (3.7 mi) south-west of Džūkste in Latvia.

== Summary of career ==
=== Aerial victory claims ===
According to US historian David T. Zabecki, Kittel was credited with 267 aerial victories. Spick also lists him with 267 aerial victories, all on the Eastern Front, claimed in 583 combat missions and a mission-to-claim ratio of 2.18. Mathews and Foreman, authors of Luftwaffe Aces — Biographies and Victory Claims, researched the German Federal Archives and found records for 265 aerial victory claims, plus three further unconfirmed claims. All of his aerial victories were claimed on the Eastern Front.

Victory claims were logged to a map-reference (PQ = Planquadrat), for example "PQ 44793". The Luftwaffe grid map covered all of Europe, western Russia and North Africa and was composed of rectangles measuring 15 minutes of latitude by 30 minutes of longitude, an area of about 360 square miles (930 km^{2}). These sectors were then subdivided into 36 smaller units to give a location area 3 km × 4 km (1.9 mi × 2.5 mi) in size.

Chronicle of aerial victories
This and the ♠ (Ace of spades) indicates those aerial victories which made Kittel an "ace-in-a-day", a term which designates a fighter pilot who has shot down five or more airplanes in a single day. This and the – (dash) indicates unconfirmed aerial victory claims for which Kittel did not receive credit. This and the ? (question mark) indicates information discrepancies listed by Prien, Stemmer, Rodeike, Balke, Bock, Mathews and Foreman.
Claim	Date	Time	Type	Location	Claim	Date	Time	Type	Location
– 2. Staffel of Jagdgeschwader 54 –
1	24 June 1941	05:19	SB-2		64	9 July 1943	12:13	Il-2	PQ 35 Ost 63533; 10 km (6.2 mi) northwest of Maloarkhangelsk
2	24 June 1941	05:42	SB-2		65	10 July 1943	07:35	LaGG-3	PQ 35 Ost 63718; 40 km (25 mi) southwest of Maloarkhangelsk
—	30 June 1941	—	Il-2	vicinity of Dünaburg	66	10 July 1943	13:50	LaGG-3	PQ 35 st 63521; 15 km (9.3 mi) west-northwest of Maloarkhangelsk
—	30 June 1941	—	Il-2	vicinity of Dünaburg	67	13 July 1943	10:41	Il-2	PQ 35 Ost 63283; 45 km (28 mi) southeast of Oryol
3	6 July 1941	15:36	SB-2		68	13 July 1943	10:44	Il-2	PQ 35 Ost 63259; 40 km (25 mi) east-southeast of Oryol
4	18 August 1941	06:00	I-18 (MiG-1)		69	13 July 1943	10:45	Il-2	PQ 35 Ost 63256; 45 km (28 mi) southeast of Oryol
5	19 August 1941	14:36	DB-3		70	13 July 1943	13:41	Il-2	PQ 35 Ost 63251; 40 km (25 mi) east-southeast of Oryol
6	24 August 1941	11:07	DB-3		71	16 July 1943	08:04	La-5	PQ 35 Ost 54483; 20 km (12 mi) northwest of Bolkhov
7	8 September 1941	16:25	R-5	10 km (6.2 mi) east of Lake Schinskoje	72	16 July 1943	09:41	La-5	PQ 35 Ost 54357; 30 km (19 mi) southeast of Zhizdra
8	8 September 1941	16:50	I-153? (Note: According to Mathews and Foreman claimed as a Curtiss P-40 Warhawk.)		73	16 July 1943	09:42	La-5	PQ 35 Ost 54327; 30 km (19 mi) east-southeast of Zhizdra
9	12 September 1941	06:00	I-153?		74	17 July 1943	06:32? (Note: According to Mathews and Foreman claimed at 06:35.)	La-5	PQ 35 Ost 54478; 25 km (16 mi) west-northwest of Bolkhov
10	21 September 1941	16:58	I-18 (MiG-1)	Leningrad	75	17 July 1943	13:10? (Note: According to Mathews and Foreman claimed at 13:16.)	Yak-9	PQ 35 Ost 54684; 25 km (16 mi) northeast of Karachev
11	13 October 1941	14:18	I-18 (MiG-1)		76	20 July 1943	12:38	LaGG-3	PQ 35 Ost 64878; 25 km (16 mi) south of Mtsensk
12	13 December 1941	12:45	DB-3		77	20 July 1943	12:56	Yak-9	PQ 35 Ost 64873; 25 km (16 mi) south of Mtsensk
13	27 February 1942	08:36	I-16		78	27 July 1943	12:39	Il-2	PQ 35 Ost 44634; 20 km (12 mi) north-northeast of Karachev
14	20 March 1942	17:07	P-40		79	28 July 1943	08:53	Il-2	PQ 35 Ost 54591; 30 km (19 mi) northeast of Karachev
15	20 March 1942	17:09	P-40		80	28 July 1943	08:54	Il-2	PQ 35 Ost 54563; 40 km (25 mi) northeast of Karachev
16	14 May 1942	15:17	SB-2		81	1 August 1943	14:18	Yak-9	PQ 35 Ost 54621; 20 km (12 mi) west of Bolkhov
17	14 May 1942	15:18	SB-2		82	2 August 1943	04:23	LaGG-3	PQ 35 Ost 54793; 25 km (16 mi) east-southeast of Karachev
18	23 August 1942	09:20	Il-2	PQ 47871; 15 km (9.3 mi) south of Zubtsov	83	2 August 1943	14:39	La-5	PQ 35 Ost 53621; 40 km (25 mi) east-southeast of Dmitrovsk
19	7 September 1942	11:46	Il-2	PQ 00522; 10 km (6.2 mi) southeast of Gatchina	84	2 August 1943	14:41	LaGG-3	PQ 35 Ost 53652; 40 km (25 mi) east-southeast of Dmitrovsk
20	23 September 1942	12:10	I-16	PQ 21733; 30 km (19 mi) north of Volkhov	85	3 August 1943	08:47	P-39	PQ 35 Ost 53473; 25 km (16 mi) east of Dmitrovsk
21	22 October 1942	09:08	Il-2	PQ 2152	86	3 August 1943	15:03	La-5	PQ 35 Ost 54814; 35 km (22 mi) west-southwest of Bolkhov
22♠	12 January 1943	10:32	Yak-1	PQ 00252; 15 km (9.3 mi) east-northeast of Schlüsselburg	87♠	4 August 1943	11:44	LaGG-3	PQ 35 Ost 44463; 20 km (12 mi) southeast of Zhizdra
23♠	12 January 1943	10:34	Il-2	PQ 00231; 10 km (6.2 mi) west of Schlüsselburg	88♠	4 August 1943	11:54	Il-2	PQ 35 Ost 54572; 20 km (12 mi) north-northeast of Karachev
24♠	12 January 1943	10:44	U-2	PQ 10163 southeast of Schlüsselburg	89♠	4 August 1943	15:13	Il-2	PQ 35 Ost 54841; 40 km (25 mi) east of Karachev
25♠	12 January 1943	10:56	Il-2	PQ 10132 east of Schlüsselburg	90♠	4 August 1943	15:26	Il-2	PQ 35 Ost 44832; 10 km (6.2 mi) northwest of Karachev
26♠	12 January 1943	14:20	I-153	PQ 00284; 10 km (6.2 mi) southwest of Schlüsselburg	91♠	4 August 1943	18:19	LaGG-3	PQ 35 Ost 44833 vicinity of Karachev
27♠	12 January 1943	14:25	Il-2	PQ 10192 east of Mga	92♠	4 August 1943	18:20	LaGG-3	PQ 35 Ost 54833; 10 km (6.2 mi) northwest of Karachev
28	14 January 1943	11:15	La-5	PQ 10243; 25 km (16 mi) east-southeast of Schlüsselburg	93♠	4 August 1943	18:21	La-5	PQ 35 Ost 44664; 25 km (16 mi) north-northwest of Karachev
29	16 January 1943	10:30	Il-2	PQ 00264; 10 km (6.2 mi) southwest of Schlüsselburg	94	5 August 1943	14:10	LaGG-3	PQ 35 Ost 54712; 15 km (9.3 mi) north-northeast of Karachev
30	24 January 1943	09:46	La-5	PQ 10161 southeast of Schlüsselburg	95	7 September 1943	08:14	LaGG-3	PQ 35 Ost 26683; 25 km (16 mi) north of Yartsevo
31	26 January 1943	13:45	Il-2	PQ 00264; 10 km (6.2 mi) southwest of Schlüsselburg	96	7 September 1943	10:58	Yak-9	PQ 35 Ost 26213; 20 km (12 mi) southeast of Shatalovka
32	11 February 1943	09:42	Il-2	PQ 36 Ost 00424; Pushkin-Mga	97	10 September 1943	15:08	P-40	PQ 35 Ost 26473; 45 km (28 mi) east-southeast of Maklok
33	14 February 1943	13:20	Il-2	PQ 36 Ost 10531; 10 km (6.2 mi) northeast of Lubań	98	11 September 1943	11:01? (Note: According to Mathews and Foreman claimed at 11:05.)	LaGG-3	PQ 35 Ost 44124; 15 km (9.3 mi) south of Kirov
34	14 February 1943	13:45	Il-2	PQ 36 Ost 10612; 20 km (12 mi) northeast of Lubań	99	12 September 1943	09:27	LaGG-3	PQ 35 Ost 45871; 20 km (12 mi) east-southeast of Kirov
35	15 February 1943	08:28	Il-2	PQ 36 Ost 00462; 10 km (6.2 mi) north of Tosno	100	14 September 1943	16:12	Yak-9	PQ 35 Ost 26642; 25 km (16 mi) northeast of Moschna
36	19 February 1943	13:06	LaGG-3	PQ 36 Ost 10421; 35 km (22 mi) east-southeast of Mga	101	14 September 1943	16:37? (Note: According to Mathews and Foreman claimed at 16:38.)	La-5	PQ 35 Ost 25654; 20 km (12 mi) east of Shatalovka
37	19 February 1943	15:17	La-5	PQ 36 Ost 10612; 20 km (12 mi) northeast of Lubań	102	14 September 1943	16:40	LaGG-3	PQ 35 Ost 35573; 30 km (19 mi) south-southwest of Yelnya
38	19 February 1943	15:19	I-180 (Yak-7)	PQ 36 Ost 10472; 25 km (16 mi) northeast of Lubań	103	15 September 1943	13:38? (Note: According to Mathews and Foreman claimed at 13:28.)	Pe-2	PQ 35 Ost 35341; 20 km (12 mi) northwest of Yelnya
39	19 February 1943	15:22	Pe-2	PQ 36 Ost 10422; 35 km (22 mi) east-southeast of Mga	104	15 September 1943	13:40	Pe-2? (Note: According to Mathews and Foreman claimed as a Ilyushin Il-2.)	PQ 35 Ost 35311; 10 km (6.2 mi) south of Smolensk
40	21 February 1943	07:40	I-16	PQ 36 Ost 00293; 10 km (6.2 mi) west of Mga	105	30 September 1943	14:04	Il-2	PQ 35 Ost 16873; 15 km (9.3 mi) southeast of Andrejewo
41	7 March 1943	07:55	LaGG-3	PQ 35 Ost 18221; 25 km (16 mi) east-southeast of Staraya Russa	106	5 October 1943	08:09	Yak-9	PQ 35 Ost 02734
42	7 March 1943	08:05	LaGG-3	PQ 35 Ost 19663; 35 km (22 mi) east-southeast of Novgorod	107	5 October 1943	12:09	LaGG-3	PQ 35 Ost 02673; 55 km (34 mi) northeast of Zelenogorsk
43	10 March 1943	14:27	LaGG-3	PQ 35 Ost 19891; 30 km (19 mi) east-northeast of Staraya Russa	108	11 October 1943	14:41	LaGG-3	PQ 35 Ost 06242
44	10 March 1943	14:32	MiG-3	PQ 35 Ost 19822; 30 km (19 mi) northeast of Staraya Russa	109	12 October 1943	11:13	LaGG-3	PQ 35 Ost 15552; 20 km (12 mi) northeast of Gorki
45	14 March 1943	14:58	LaGG-3	PQ 35 Ost 18211; 20 km (12 mi) east-southeast of Staraya Russa	110	12 October 1943	11:15	LaGG-3	PQ 35 Ost 15553, Leninsk; 20 km (12 mi) northeast of Gorki
46	14 March 1943	15:02	LaGG-3	PQ 35 Ost 19891; 30 km (19 mi) east-northeast of Staraya Russa	111	12 October 1943	14:44	LaGG-3	PQ 35 Ost 15554; 20 km (12 mi) northeast of Gorki
47	15 March 1943	09:35	MiG-3	PQ 35 Ost 19892; 30 km (19 mi) east-northeast of Staraya Russa	112	13 October 1943	10:11	R-5	PQ 35 Ost 15354, north-northwest of Krassnyj north-northeast of Krassnoye
48	1 April 1943	11:03	Il-2	PQ 36 Ost 10873; 10 km (6.2 mi) south of Chudovo	113	14 October 1943	08:05	LaGG-3	PQ 35 Ost 15523 northeast of Gorki
49	1 April 1943	17:34	Il-2	PQ 36 Ost 10364; 25 km (16 mi) southeast of Mga	114	14 October 1943	08:06	LaGG-3	PQ 35 Ost 15551; 20 km (12 mi) northeast of Gorki
50	11 June 1943	18:07	La-5	PQ 36 Ost 00162; 10 km (6.2 mi) southeast of Leningrad	115	15 October 1943	07:37	LaGG-3	PQ 35 Ost 06243, northwest of Usswjaty
51	18 June 1943	17:11	P-40	PQ 36 Ost 20152 southwest of Volkhov	116	15 October 1943	07:38	LaGG-3	PQ 35 Ost 06243, northwest of Usswjaty
52	22 June 1943	02:19	Il-2	PQ 36 Ost 00514; 10 km (6.2 mi) south of Gatchina	117	15 October 1943	08:04	Il-2	PQ 35 Ost 06814
53	22 June 1943	02:21	Il-2	PQ 36 Ost 00382; 10 km (6.2 mi) east of Gatchina	118	15 October 1943	14:15	LaGG-3	PQ 35 Ost 15713, south of Gorki
54	24 June 1943	06:47	P-40	PQ 36 Ost 10253; 30 km (19 mi) east-northeast of Schlüsselburg	119	17 October 1943	12:44	LaGG-3	PQ 35 Ost 06144, southeast of Nevel
55	24 June 1943	06:49	P-40	PQ 36 Ost 10234; 35 km (22 mi) west of Volkhov	120	19 October 1943	07:14	LaGG-3	PQ 35 Ost 06214, Lake Ssennitza
56	5 July 1943	04:20	La-5	PQ 35 Ost 63684; 10 km (6.2 mi) west of Voltcansk	121	22 October 1943	08:14	La-5	PQ 35 Ost 15351, 50 km (31 mi) northeast of Orsha
57	5 July 1943	12:02	LaGG-3	PQ 35 Ost 63714, Nikolskoje; 40 km (25 mi) southwest of Maloarkhangelsk	122	23 October 1943	13:08	La-5	PQ 35 Ost 05493
58	5 July 1943	12:40	Il-2	PQ 35 Ost 63434; 45 km (28 mi) southwest of Maloarkhangelsk	123	28 October 1943	15:25	LaGG-3	southwest of Gomel
59	5 July 1943	12:41	Il-2	PQ 35 Ost 63781; 35 km (22 mi) north of Kursk	124	5 November 1943	09:23	Il-2	northwest of Nevel
60	7 July 1943	05:16	P-40	PQ 35 Ost 63674; 15 km (9.3 mi) south of Maloarkhangelsk	125	5 November 1943	09:25	Il-2	southwest of Nevel
61	7 July 1943	11:08	P-39	PQ 35 Ost 53834; 55 km (34 mi) north-northwest of Kursk	126	5 November 1943	14:42	LaGG-3	northwest of Lake Ssennitza northwest of Lake Jzenniza
62	7 July 1943	11:10	P-40	PQ 35 Ost 63743; 20 km (12 mi) north of Maloarkhangelsk	127	6 November 1943	12:10	Il-2	south-southeast of Nevel
63	9 July 1943	11:59	Il-2	PQ 35 Ost 63594; 20 km (12 mi) south-southwest of Maloarkhangelsk					
– 3. Staffel of Jagdgeschwader 54 –
128	5 March 1944	08:28? (Note: According to Mathews and Foreman claimed at 08:29.)	La-5	PQ 26 Ost 70692; 15 km (9.3 mi) southwest of Narva	168	30 June 1944	19:46	Il-2	PQ PS-2/8
? (Note: This claim is not listed by Prien, Stemmer, Balke and Bock.)	6 March 1944	09:41	La-5		169	30 June 1944	19:49	Il-2	PQ PS-5/9
129	7 March 1944	11:29? (Note: According to Mathews and Foreman claimed at 11:27.)	Il-2	PQ 26 Ost 70454; Baltic Sea 25 km (16 mi) northwest of Hungerburg	170	1 July 1944	07:16	P-39	PQ OS-2/7; Novorzhev/Pskov
130	7 March 1944	11:45	Yak-9? (Note: According to Mathews and Foreman claimed as a Yakovlev Yak-1.)	PQ 26 Ost 70413; Baltic Sea 35 km (22 mi) northwest of Hungerburg	171	2 July 1944	17:20	P-39	PQ OS-9/6; Novorzhev/Pskov
131	8 March 1944	12:33	La-5	PQ 25 Ost 89144; 50 km (31 mi) southwest of Narva	172	3 July 1944	11:43	P-39	PQ OS-6/7; Novorzhev/Pskov
132	8 March 1944	12:35	La-5	PQ 26 Ost 70874; 25 km (16 mi) south of Slancy	173	3 July 1944	11:45	Il-2	PQ OS-6/1; Novorzhev/Pskov
133	19 March 1944	16:27	Yak-9?	PQ 25 Ost 70332; Lake Peipus	174	4 July 1944	10:46	Il-2	PQ OS-7/2 vicinity of Polotsk
134	19 March 1944	16:28	Yak-9	PQ 26 Ost 70451; Lake Peipus	175	4 July 1944	15:46	P-39	PQ PS-2/4 vicinity of Polotsk
135	26 March 1944	11:06	R-5	PQ 25 Ost 79284 vicinity of Lake Peipus	176	10 July 1944	15:44	P-39	PQ NM-2/9 south of Subat
136	26 March 1944	11:17? (Note: According to Mathews and Foreman claimed at 11:07.)	R-5	PQ 25 Ost 79291 vicinity east of Lake Peipus	177	16 July 1944	08:02	P-39	PQ 25 Ost 43495
137	26 March 1944	15:13	Yak-9	PQ 26 Ost 70381; 20 km (12 mi) southwest of Narva	178	16 July 1944	09:34	Il-2	PQ OO-7/1
138	28 March 1944	11:10? (Note: According to Mathews and Foreman claimed at 11:11.)	Yak-9	PQ 26 Ost 70323; Baltic Sea 45 km (28 mi) northeast of Kunda	179	18 July 1944	16:47	Yak-9	PQ JR-7/6 south of Ostrov
139	30 March 1944	08:25	Pe-2	PQ 26 Ost 70254; Baltic Sea 75 km (47 mi) northeast of Kunda	180	18 July 1944	17:01? (Note: According to Mathews and Foreman claimed at 17:05.)	Yak-9	PQ HR-8/3 south of Ostrov
140	30 March 1944	08:59? (Note: According to Mathews and Foreman claimed at 08:30.)	La-5	PQ 26 Ost 70352; Baltic Sea 35 km (22 mi) northeast of Kunda	181	21 July 1944	09:20	Il-2	PQ OL-2/5 northwest of Utsyani
141	30 March 1944	15:28	La-5	PQ 26 Ost 70441; Baltic Sea 30 km (19 mi) northwest of Hungerburg	182	21 July 1944	09:23	Yak-9	PQ OL-5/9 northwest of Utsyani
142	1 April 1944	08:10	Yak-9	PQ 25 Ost 98534; 30 km (19 mi) west of Gorodok	183	21 July 1944	14:45	Yak-9	PQ ON-1/4
143	2 April 1944	08:43	La-5	PQ 26 Ost 70393; Gulf of Finland	184	22 July 1944	15:54	Il-2	PQ NN-3/4 vicinity of Daugavpils
144	2 April 1944	09:03? (Note: According to Mathews and Foreman claimed at 09:01.)	La-5	PQ 26 Ost 70393; Gulf of Finland	185	22 July 1944	15:55	Il-2	PQ NN-6/4 vicinity of Daugavpils
145	2 April 1944	15:20	Pe-2	PQ 26 Ost 60552 northeast of Kunda	186	22 July 1944	15:57	Il-2	PQ NN-9/5 vicinity of Daugavpils
146	2 April 1944	15:22	Pe-2	PQ 26 Ost 60434 northeast of Kunda	187	24 July 1944	15:43	Pe-2	PQ NL-3/7
147♠	4 April 1944	08:10	Il-2	PQ 26 Ost 60332; Baltic Sea 30 km (19 mi) northeast of Kunda	188	24 July 1944	15:46	Pe-2	PQ NL-8/1
148♠	4 April 1944	08:11	Il-2	PQ 26 Ost 60333; Baltic Sea 30 km (19 mi) northeast of Kunda	189	29 July 1944	13:23	Il-2	PQ OL-3/4 vicinity of Svedasai
149♠	4 April 1944	08:14	LaGG-3	PQ 26 Ost 70342 northwest of Kunda	190	29 July 1944	13:27	Il-2	PQ OL-6/2 vicinity of Svedasai
150♠	4 April 1944	08:15? (Note: According to Mathews and Foreman claimed at 08:18.)	LaGG-3	PQ 26 Ost 70343 northwest of Kunda	191	1 August 1944	15:15	Yak-9	PQ KH-4/9
151♠	4 April 1944	08:30	La-5	PQ 26 Ost 70537; Baltic Sea 35 km (22 mi) west of Hungerburg	192	1 August 1944	15:17	Yak-9	PQ KH-8/2
152	24 April 1944	17:17	Yak-9	PQ 26 Ost 70434; Baltic Sea 65 km (40 mi) northeast of Kunda	193	1 August 1944	19:47	Yak-9	PQ LH-1/5
153	24 April 1944	17:29	La-5	PQ 26 Ost 70274; Baltic Sea 25 km (16 mi) northwest of Hungerburg	194	7 August 1944	19:00	Yak-9	PQ KN-8/1/9 northeast of Kreuzburg
154	26 May 1944	19:07	La-5	PQ 26 Ost 80321; Baltic Sea north-northeast of Hungerburg	195	15 August 1944	09:26	Yak-9	PQ LJ-5/2
155	30 May 1944	13:46? (Note: According to Mathews and Foreman claimed at 10:17.)	Pe-2	PQ 26 Ost 7063	196	15 August 1944	17:39	Yak-9	PQ LJ-9/5
156	30 May 1944	21:03	La-5	PQ 26 Ost 70491; Baltic Sea 10 km (6.2 mi) northwest of Hungerburg	197	15 August 1944	18:17	Il-2	PQ 25 Ost 47556
157	2 June 1944	10:25	LaGG-3	PQ 26 Ost 80714; 20 km (12 mi) south of Narva	198	17 August 1944	08:39	Pe-2	PQ LL-6/3
158	5 June 1944	20:33	Yak-9	PQ 26 Ost 70252; Baltic Sea 75 km (47 mi) northeast of Kunda	199	25 August 1944	08:47	P-39	PQ LH-5/6
159? (Note: This claim is not listed by Mathews and Foreman.)	6 June 1944	10:25	P-39	PQ 26 Ost 80971	200	26 August 1944	10:09	Yak-9	PQ KG-9/7
160♠	28 June 1944	10:18	Il-2	PQ QT-1/4	201	26 August 1944	13:54	La-5	PQ LH-4/4
161♠	28 June 1944	10:20	P-39	PQ PT-2/3	202	27 August 1944	13:06? (Note: According to Mathews and Foreman claimed at 13:00.)	Il-2	PQ LJ-9/7
162♠	28 June 1944	10:22	Il-2	PQ OT-8/1	203	28 August 1944	11:24	Yak-9	PQ JM-5/3
163♠	28 June 1944	10:29	P-39	PQ PT-1/2	204	28 August 1944	11:26	Yak-9	PQ JM-6/2
164♠	28 June 1944	14:32	Il-2	PQ PT-8/8	205	28 August 1944	11:27	Yak-9	PQ JM-3/7
165	29 June 1944	13:23	P-39	PQ OT-8/1	206	31 August 1944	17:46	Il-2	PQ KG-3/2 west of Mitau
166	30 June 1944	11:38? (Note: According to Mathews and Foreman claimed at 11:12.)	P-39	PQ OT-7/7	207	31 August 1944	17:47	Il-2	PQ KG-3/4 west of Mitau
167	30 June 1944	18:49? (Note: According to Mathews and Foreman claimed at 18:40.)	Yak-9	PQ PS-8/1	208	31 August 1944	17:49	Il-2	PQ KG-6/3 west of Mitau
– 2. Staffel of Jagdgeschwader 54 –
?	14 September 1944	10:40	Yak-9	20 km (12 mi) northeast of Walk	237	10 October 1944	09:12	Il-2	PQ 25 Ost 47131; 20 km (12 mi) east of Riga
209♠	14 September 1944	10:53	Yak-9	PQ 25 Ost 66156; 40 km (25 mi) east of Weissenstein	238	10 October 1944	09:12	Il-2	PQ 25 Ost 47131; 20 km (12 mi) east of Riga
210♠	14 September 1944	14:50	Il-2	PQ 25 Ost 57251; 40 km (25 mi) north-northwest of Kreuzburg	239	14 October 1944	11:02	La-5	PQ 25 Ost 46832; 10 km (6.2 mi) northeast of Riga
211♠	14 September 1944	14:51	Il-2	PQ 25 Ost 57251; 40 km (25 mi) north-northwest of Kreuzburg	240	16 October 1944	11:02	Il-2	PQ 25 Ost 37345; 40 km (25 mi) south-southwest of Tukkum
212♠	14 September 1944	14:52	Il-2	PQ 25 Ost 57258; 40 km (25 mi) north-northwest of Kreuzburg	241	16 October 1944	11:04	La-5	PQ 25 Ost 37329; 25 km (16 mi) south of Tukkum
213♠	14 September 1944	14:54? (Note: According to Mathews and Foreman claimed over a Yakovlev Yak-9 at 14:53.)	Il-2?	PQ 25 Ost 57253; 40 km (25 mi) north-northwest of Kreuzburg	242	16 October 1944	14:26	Il-2	PQ 25 Ost 37343; 40 km (25 mi) southwest of Mitau
214	15 September 1944	15:39	Il-2	PQ 25 Ost 47377; 45 km (28 mi) south of Riga	243	16 October 1944	14:28	Il-2	PQ 25 Ost 37388; 25 km (16 mi) southwest of Mitau
215	15 September 1944	15:40	Il-2	PQ 25 Ost 37495; 20 km (12 mi) southeast of Mitau	244	17 October 1944	13:17	La-5	PQ 25 Ost 37554; 40 km (25 mi) south-southwest of Mitau
216	16 September 1944	17:12	Il-2	PQ 25 Ost 47518; 45 km (28 mi) northeast of Pasewalk	245	18 October 1944	13:36	Il-2	PQ 25 Ost 27582; 30 km (19 mi) north of Telšiai
217	17 September 1944	08:39	Pe-2	PQ 25 Ost 47383; 45 km (28 mi) south-southeast of Riga	246	18 October 1944	13:37	Il-2	PQ 25 Ost 27554; 45 km (28 mi) north of Telšiai
218	17 September 1944	08:40	P-39	PQ 25 Ost 47389; 45 km (28 mi) south-southeast of Riga	247	22 October 1944	15:50	Il-2? (Note: According to Mathews and Foreman claimed as a Yakovlev Yak-3.)	PQ 25 Ost 17646; 30 km (19 mi) southeast of Libau
219	17 September 1944	08:41	Pe-2	PQ 25 Ost 47522; 40 km (25 mi) north of Pasewalk	248♠	27 October 1944	09:50	Yak-9	PQ 25 Ost 27642; 45 km (28 mi) north-northeast of Telšiai
220	20 September 1944	11:10	Yak-9	PQ 25 Ost 47324; 30 km (19 mi) southeast of Riga	249♠	27 October 1944	09:51	Yak-9	PQ 25 Ost 27565; 45 km (28 mi) north-northeast of Telšiai
221	20 September 1944	11:12	Yak-9	PQ 25 Ost 47372; 30 km (19 mi) southeast of Riga	250♠	27 October 1944	09:57	Il-2	PQ 25 Ost 17625; 45 km (28 mi) east-southeast of Libau
222	22 September 1944	10:15	La-5	PQ 25 Ost 47323; 30 km (19 mi) southeast of Riga	251♠	27 October 1944	11:48	Pe-2	PQ 25 Ost 17485; 40 km (25 mi) east of Libau
223	28 September 1944	11:30	Pe-2	PQ 25 Ost 47291; 45 km (28 mi) east-southeast of Riga	252♠	27 October 1944	11:50	Pe-2	PQ 25 Ost 27543; 25 km (16 mi) south of Libau
224	28 September 1944	11:30	Pe-2	PQ 25 Ost 47264; 30 km (19 mi) south of Mālpils	253♠	27 October 1944	13:24	Il-2	PQ 25 Ost 17574; 45 km (28 mi) north-northwest of Telšiai
225	28 September 1944	11:37	Pe-2	PQ 25 Ost 57181; 35 km (22 mi) southeast of Mālpils	254♠	27 October 1944	13:32	Il-2	PQ 25 Ost 17651; 45 km (28 mi) southeast of Libau
226	28 September 1944	11:38	Yak-9	PQ 25 Ost 57184; 35 km (22 mi) southeast of Mālpils	255♠	29 October 1944	09:42	Il-2	PQ 25 Ost 17488; 40 km (25 mi) east of Libau
227	30 September 1944	11:35	Yak-9	PQ 25 Ost 57174; 30 km (19 mi) south-southeast of Mālpils	256♠	29 October 1944	09:45	Il-2	PQ 25 Ost 17491; 45 km (28 mi) south of Goldingen
228	30 September 1944	11:36	Il-2	PQ 25 Ost 47268; 45 km (28 mi) east-southeast of Riga	257♠	29 October 1944	11:57	Il-2	PQ 25 Ost 17624; 45 km (28 mi) east-southeast of Libau
229	30 September 1944	11:38	Il-2	PQ 25 Ost 57154; 25 km (16 mi) southeast of Mālpils	258♠	29 October 1944	12:09	Il-2	PQ 25 Ost 17497; 45 km (28 mi) south of Goldingen
230	7 October 1944	15:10	Yak-9	PQ 25 Ost 48697; 20 km (12 mi) west of Wenden	259♠	29 October 1944	12:10	Il-2	PQ 25 Ost 17623; 45 km (28 mi) east-southeast of Libau
231♠	9 October 1944	08:55	Il-2	PQ 25 Ost 48782; 10 km (6.2 mi) northeast of Riga	260♠	29 October 1944	12:11	Il-2	PQ 25 Ost 27628; 45 km (28 mi) east-southeast of Libau
232♠	9 October 1944	08:56	Il-2	PQ 25 Ost 48765; 25 km (16 mi) northeast of Riga	261	30 October 1944	13:22	Il-2	PQ 25 Ost 27541; 45 km (28 mi) north-northwest of Telšiai
233♠	9 October 1944	08:58	Il-2	PQ 25 Ost 48789; 10 km (6.2 mi) northeast of Riga	262	30 October 1944	13:52	Il-2	PQ 25 Ost 17489; 40 km (25 mi) east of Libau
234♠	9 October 1944	13:02	Il-2	PQ 25 Ost 47741; 25 km (16 mi) southeast of Riga	263	30 October 1944	15:26	Il-2	PQ 25 Ost 17622; 45 km (28 mi) east-southeast of Libau
235♠	9 October 1944	13:04	Il-2	PQ 25 Ost 47571; 25 km (16 mi) southeast of Riga	264	19 November 1944	15:26? (Note: According to Mathews and Foreman claimed at 11:40.)	La-5	PQ 25 Ost 29754
236	10 October 1944	09:11	La-5	PQ 25 Ost 47139; 20 km (12 mi) east of Riga	—	14 February 1945	—	Il-2	vicinity of Dzukste

=== Awards ===
- Wound Badge in Black
- Honor Goblet of the Luftwaffe on 21 December 1942 as Feldwebel and pilot
- Front Flying Clasp of the Luftwaffe in Gold with Pennant "500"
- Combined Pilots-Observation Badge
- German Cross in Gold on 18 March 1943 as Feldwebel in the 2./Jagdgeschwader 54 (Note: According to Thomas on 26 February 1943.)
- Iron Cross (1939)
  - 2nd Class (30 June 1941)
  - 1st Class (October 1941)
- Knight's Cross of the Iron Cross with Oak Leaves and Swords
  - Knight's Cross on 29 October 1943 as Oberfeldwebel and pilot in the 2./Jagdgeschwader 54 (Note: According to Scherzer as pilot in the I./JG 54.)
  - 449th Oak Leaves on 11 April 1944 as Leutnant (war officer) pilot in the 1./Jagdgeschwader 54
  - 113th Swords on 25 November 1944 as Oberleutnant (war officer) and Staffelkapitän of the 2./Jagdgeschwader 54
