= Bonin (surname) =

Bonin is a surname. Notable people with the surname include:

- Anatoliy Bonin (1915–1981), Soviet soldier during World War II, Hero of the Soviet Union
- Celeste Bonin (born 1986), professional wrestler currently working under the ring name "Kaitlyn"
- Charlotte Bonin (born 1987), Italian professional triathlete
- Gordie Bonin (1948–2013), Canadian drag racer
- Grzegorz Bonin (born 1983), Polish footballer, midfielder, right winger, dribbler and long-distance-striker
- Marcel Bonin (1931–2025), Canadian ice hockey player
- Marcel Bonin (sport shooter) (1904–1980), French sport shooter
- Patrick Bonin, Canadian politician
- Paul Bonin, English songwriter and musician
- Tomasz Bonin (born 1973), Polish heavyweight boxer
- Viktor Bonin (1918–1993), Soviet soldiers during World War II, Hero of the Soviet Union
- William Bonin (1947–1996), American serial murderer
- Pierre-Cédric Bonin (died 2009), French co-pilot on Air France Flight 447

== See also ==
- von Bonin
