= Bogislaw von Bonin =

German Wehrmacht officer

- Born: 17 January 1908; Potsdam, Kingdom of Prussia, German Empire
- Died: 13 August 1980 (aged 72); Lehrte, Lower Saxony, West Germany
- Relatives: Eckart-Wilhelm von Bonin; Hubertus von Bonin
- Military career
- Allegiance: Weimar Republic; Nazi Germany
- Service years: 1926–45
- Rank: Oberst (Colonel)
- Conflicts: World War II: Vistula–Oder Offensive
- Awards: German Cross
- Other work: Journalist

Bogislaw Oskar Adolf Fürchtegott von Bonin (also Bogislav; 17 January 1908 – 13 August 1980) was a colonel in the German Wehrmacht and journalist.

== Early life ==
Von Bonin was born in Potsdam, Brandenburg as son of Bogislav Gerhard Wilhelm Fürchtegott von Bonin (1878–1945/48), Major in WWI, later Oberst (Colonel) of the Luftwaffe in WWII. He joined the 4. Reiterregiment (4th Cavalry Regiment) of the German Reichswehr in 1926. From October 1927 to August 1928, he received officer training at the School of Infantry, Dresden, together with Claus von Stauffenberg and Manfred von Brauchitsch, and was promoted to lieutenant in 1930. In 1937-1938, he attended the War Academy (Kriegsakademie) in Berlin and became a member of the Army High Command in 1938.

== Second World War ==
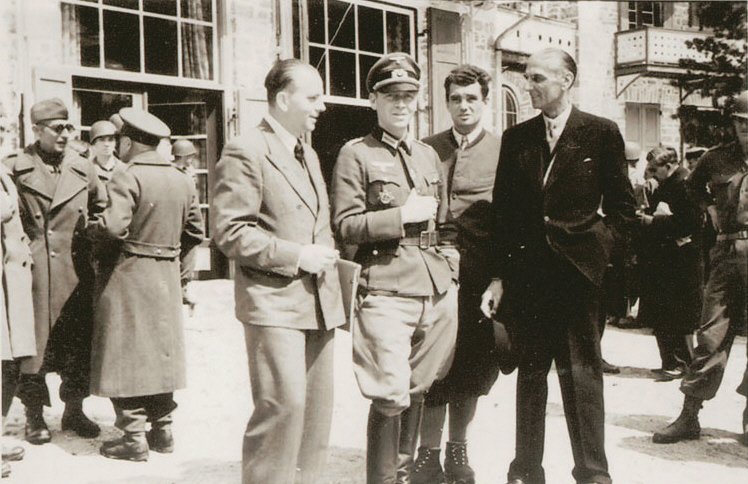
Colonel Bogislaw von Bonin (center) is seen with fellow hostages shortly after their liberation by US forces in South Tyrol on 5 May 1945

In 1943, he was the chief of staff of the XIV Panzer Corps in Sicily and for a short time chief of staff of the LVI Panzer Corps of the 1st Hungarian Army in 1944. He attained the rank of colonel and became the chief of the Operational Branch of the Army General Staff (Generalstab des Heeres).

=== Arrest ===
On 16 January 1945, Bonin gave Heeresgruppe A permission to retreat from Warsaw during the Soviet Vistula-Oder Offensive, rejecting a direct command from Adolf Hitler for them to hold fast. He was arrested by the Gestapo on 19 January 1945 and imprisoned first at Flossenbürg concentration camp and then Dachau concentration camp.

With several family members (Sippenhäftlingen) of the 20 July plot and other notable prisoners such as Léon Blum, Kurt Schuschnigg, Hjalmar Schacht, Franz Halder and Fritz Thyssen, he was transferred to Niederdorf in South Tyrol.

Hearing that an old friend of his, Generaloberst Heinrich von Vietinghoff, was in command of Army Group C with headquarters in Bolzano, Bonin attempted to contact him in order to ask him to safeguard the prisoners, making the identity of the high-status prisoners known as well as the fear that they would be executed before they could be liberated by US troops. Not getting hold of von Vietinghoff, he instead spoke to his chief of staff, General Hans Röttiger, whom he also knew, who promised to contact von Vietinghoff for him.

A message was sent to Wehrmacht troops in Sexten, 17 kilometres (11 mi) east of Niederdorf, resulting in the arrival next day of Captain Wichard von Alvensleben together with 150 soldiers. Thus, on 30 April, against the background of advancing US troops and Alvensleben's unit, which had now surrounded the village, the SS guards decided to escape in one bus and one lorry. The freed prisoners were then accommodated at the Pragser Wildsee Hotel until advance units from the 42nd and the 45th Infantry Divisions reached Niederdorf, on 5 May 1945.

== Post-war ==
Bonin became a prisoner of war and started working as a freight forwarder in 1947, but later on for Daimler Benz. In 1952, he joined the "Amt Blank" (Bureau Blank, named after its director Theodor Blank), the predecessor of the later Federal Ministry of Defence, as the head of the military planning subdivision, to map out a strategy for the German contribution to the European Defence Community. However, he came into conflict with the Adenauer government, as he favoured a more neutral or independent German policy. In 1955, before the German Bundeswehr was established, Bonin was released from the Federal Ministry of Defence and became a journalist.

Bonin died in Lehrte.

== Awards ==
- German Cross in Gold on 14 January 1942 as Major im Generalstab in the 17. Panzer-Division
