= Juprelle =

Municipality in Liège Province, Wallonia, Belgium

Juprelle Djouprele (Walloon)
- Municipality
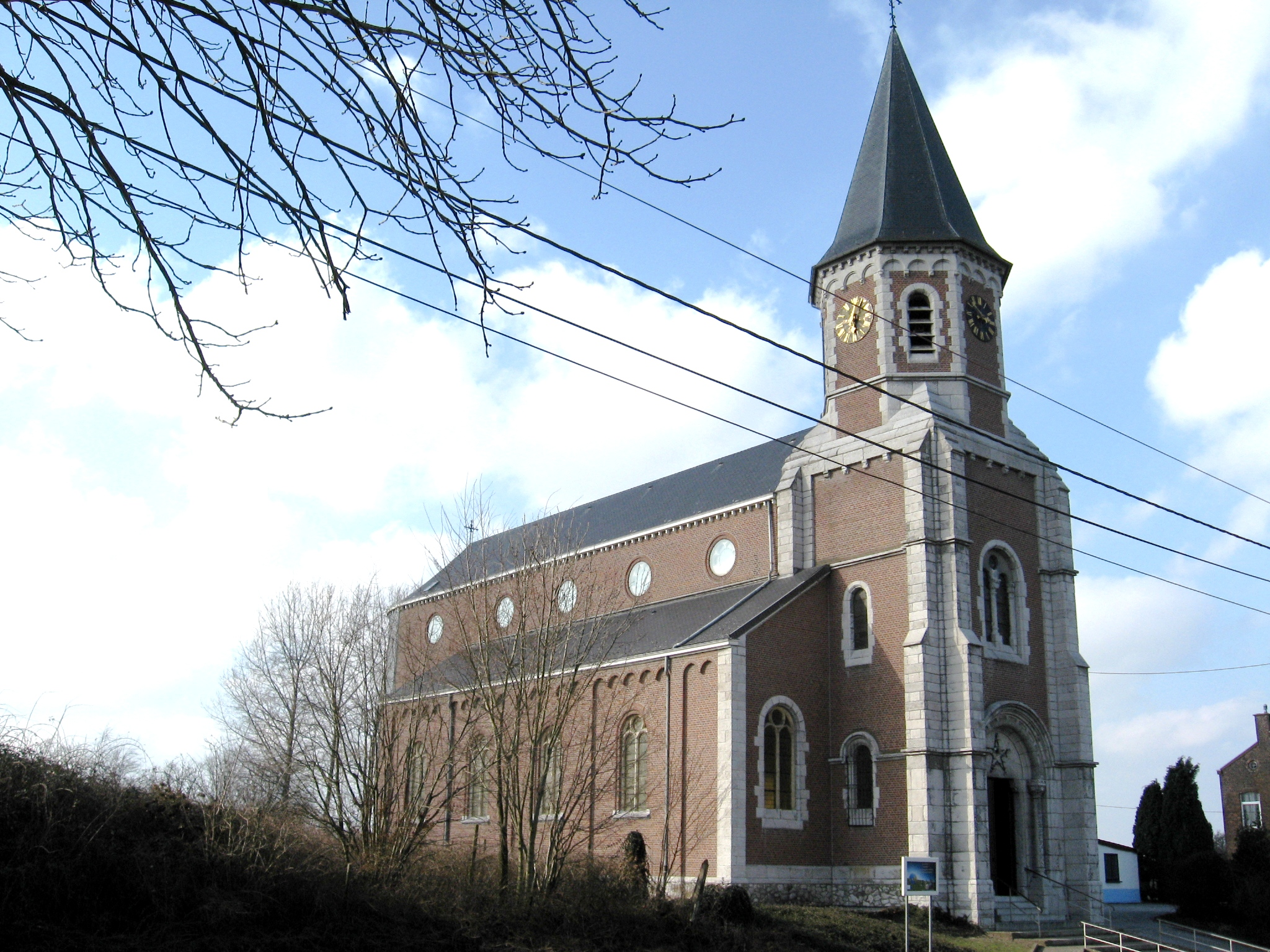

- Flag Coat of arms

- Location of Juprelle in Liège province
- Interactive map of Juprelle
- Location in Belgium
- Coordinates: 50°43′N 05°32′E
- Country: Belgium
- Community: French Community
- Region: Wallonia
- Province: Liège
- Arrondissement: Liège

Government
  - Mayor: Christine Servaes
  - Governing party: IC

Area
  - Total: 35.47 km^{2} (13.70 sq mi)

Population (2018-01-01)
  - Total: 9,288
  - Density: 261.9/km^{2} (678.2/sq mi)
- Postal codes: 4450-4453, 4458
- NIS code: 62060
- Area codes: 04
- Website: www.juprelle.be

Juprelle (French pronunciation: [ʒypʁɛl]; Walloon: Djouprele) is a municipality of Wallonia located in the province of Liège, Belgium.

On 1 January 2006 Juprelle had a total resident population of 8,405. The total area is 35.36 km^{2} which gives a population density of 238 inhabitants per km^{2}.

The municipality consists of the following districts: Fexhe-Slins, Juprelle, Lantin, Paifve, Slins, Villers-Saint-Siméon, Voroux-lez-Liers, and Wihogne.

== See also ==
- List of protected heritage sites in Juprelle
