= Eckart-Wilhelm von Bonin =

German World War II night fighter pilot (1919–1992)

- Born: 14 November 1919; Potsdam, Province of Brandenburg, Free State of Prussia, German Reich
- Died: 11 January 1992 (aged 72); Hamburg-Eimsbüttel, Federal Republic of Germany
- Relatives: Bogislaw von Bonin; Hubertus von Bonin
- Military career
- Allegiance: Nazi Germany
- Branch: Luftwaffe
- Service years: 1937–1945
- Rank: Major
- Unit: NJG 1
- Commands: II./NJG 1
- Conflicts: World War II: Schweinfurt–Regensburg mission
- Awards: Knight's Cross of the Iron Cross

Eckart-Wilhelm Max Bogislaw Fürchtegott von Bonin (14 November 1919 – 11 January 1992) was a German World War II night fighter pilot who served in the Luftwaffe. A flying ace or fighter ace is a military aviator credited with shooting down five or more enemy aircraft during aerial combat. He is credited with shooting down 37 enemy aircraft claimed during 150 combat missions.

== Early life and career ==
Von Bonin was born on 14 November 1919 in Potsdam in the Province of Brandenburg of the Weimar Republic. He was the son of Bogislav Gerhard Wilhelm Fürchtegott von Bonin, Major in WWI, later Oberst (Colonel) of the Luftwaffe in WWII, and his wife Pauline Emilie Mathilde, née von Bülow (1885–1968), a daughter of General der Kavallerie Adolf von Bülow.

His older brother, Bogislaw von Bonin served in the Army and later in the Amt Blank, a predecessor of the Federal Ministry of Defence. Two of his brothers also served in the Luftwaffe, 1st Lieutenant Jürgen-Oskar Bogislaw Adolf Fürchtegott von Bonin was killed in action on 8 February 1942 while serving as an observer in a Transportgeschwader (air transport wing). Another brother, Hubertus Bogislav Oskar Adolf Fürchtegott von Bonin, became a fighter pilot and wing commander with 77 aerial victories and was also killed in the war. Von Bonin entered military service with the Luftwaffe in 1937 and was trained as a night fighter pilot.

== Night fighter career ==
A map of part of the Kammhuber Line. The 'belt' and night fighter 'boxes' are shown.

Following the 1939 aerial Battle of the Heligoland Bight, RAF attacks shifted to the cover of darkness, initiating the Defence of the Reich campaign. By mid-1940, Generalmajor (Brigadier General) Josef Kammhuber had established a night air defense system dubbed the Kammhuber Line. It consisted of a series of control sectors equipped with radars and searchlights and an associated night fighter. Each sector named a Himmelbett (canopy bed) would direct the night fighter into visual range with target bombers. In 1941, the Luftwaffe started equipping night fighters with airborne radar such as the Lichtenstein radar. This airborne radar did not come into general use until early 1942.

In October 1940, von Bonin was posted to 6. Staffel (6th squadron) of Nachtjagdgeschwader 1 (NJG 1—1st Night Fighter Wing). This squadron was part of II. Gruppe (2nd group) of NJG 1 commanded by Major Walter Ehle.

=== "Wheels Down" incident ===
The United States Army Air Forces (USAAF) targeted the German aircraft industry on 17 August 1943 in the Schweinfurt–Regensburg mission. Two Boeing B-17 Flying Fortress bombers from the 4th Bombardment Wing had been forced to leave their formation on their way to Regensburg. The B-17 "Picklepuss" piloted by Captain Robert M. Knox from the 100th Bomb Group headed back to England when it came under attack by three Messerschmitt Bf 110 night fighters south of Aachen. Von Bonin, accompanied by Oberleutnant Walter Barte and Leutnant Hans Witzke had taken off from Sint-Truiden—Saint-Trond in the French pronunciation—to intercept any stragglers to and from the target area. Von Bonin shot down the B-17 on his first attack but one of his engines was also hit be the left waist gunner. While six of the ten crew members of the B-17 were killed in action, von Bonin landed safely on one engine at Saint-Trond.

Following this engagement, controversy arose whether Knox had lowered his landing gear to signal surrender. Apparently, a B-17 had lowered its landing gears and had then shot down one of the escorting Luftwaffe fighters, becoming the "Wheels Down" incident.

=== Group commander ===
On 18 November 1943, von Bonin was appointed Gruppenkommandeur (group commander) of II. Gruppe of NJG 1. He succeeded Major Walter Ehle who was killed in action. He was promoted to Hauptmann (captain) on 1 December 1943 and awarded the Knight's Cross of the Iron Cross (Ritterkreuz des Eisernen Kreuzes) on 5 February 1944 after 31 aerial victories. On 1 August 1944, he was promoted to Major. In October 1944, he became Gruppenkommandeur of I. Gruppe of Nachtjagdgeschwader 102 (NJG 102—102nd Night Fighter Wing).

== Summary of career ==
=== Aerial victory claims ===
According to Obermaier, von Bonin was credited with 37 aerial victories claimed in roughly 150 combat missions. Two of his claims were over four-engined bombers during daytime operations, the other 35 were claimed during nocturnal missions. Aders and Spick list him with 39 aerial victories claimed in approximately 150 combat missions. Foreman, Parry and Mathews, authors of Luftwaffe Night Fighter Claims 1939 – 1945, researched the German Federal Archives and found records for 37 nocturnal victory claims. Mathews and Foreman also published Luftwaffe Aces – Biographies and Victory Claims, listing Von Bonin with 33 aerial victories, plus four further unconfirmed claims.

Chronicle of aerial victories
This and the ♠ (Ace of spades) indicates those aerial victories which made Von Bonin an "ace-in-a-day", a term which designates a fighter pilot who has shot down five or more airplanes in a single day. This along with the ! (exclamation mark) indicates a daytime aerial victory.
Claim	Date	Time	Type	Location	Serial No./Squadron No.
– 6. Staffel of Nachtjagdgeschwader 1 –
1	11 May 1941	02:20	Wellington	Tönningen	
2	12 May 1941	02:20	Blenheim	3 km (1.9 mi) west of Sankt Peter-Ording	
3	15 July 1941	01:40	Wellington	east of Zwolle	R1613/No. 214 Squadron RAF
4	7 April 1942	02:38	Manchester		Manchester L7470/No. 61 Squadron RAF
5	3 June 1942	02:41	Wellington	10 km (6.2 mi) north-northwest of Brussels	Wellington DV786/No. 156 Squadron RAF
6	9 June 1942	02:38	Halifax	4 km (2.5 mi) northeast of Brussels	
7	26 June 1942	01:38	Blenheim	16 km (9.9 mi) north of Tirlemont	Blenheim Z6084/No. 13 Squadron RAF
8	30 July 1942	03:17	Wellington	50 km (31 mi) east of Antwerp	Wellington Z1316/No. 142 Squadron RAF
9	5 October 1942	22:38	Wellington	northeast of Maastricht	Wellington BJ729/No. 419 Squadron RCAF
10	12 March 1943	21:40	Halifax	4–5 km (2.5–3.1 mi) north-northwest of Amerika	
13	26 May 1943	01:36	Wellington	8 km (5.0 mi) north of Maastricht	Wellington HF488/No. 199 Squadron RAF
14	30 May 1943	00:43	Wellington		
15	12 June 1943	01:47	Halifax	Oye-Plage, northeast of Liège	
16	22 June 1943	01:50	Stirling	18 km (11 mi) southeast of Eindhoven	
17	31 July 1943	00:57	Halifax	Mariaweiler	
18! (Note: According to Luftwaffe Aces – Biographies and Victory Claims, this claim was unconfirmed while Luftwaffe Night Fighter Claims 1939 – 1945 confirm this claim.)	17 August 1943	11:45	B-17	10 km (6.2 mi) southwest of Aachen	
19!	17 August 1943	15:07	B-17	3 km (1.9 mi) northeast of Aachen	
20	31 August 1943	00:45	Halifax		
21	7 September 1943	00:45	Halifax	southwest of Munich	
22	7 September 1943	00:47	Halifax	southwest of Munich	
23	3 November 1943	19:30	Lancaster	southwest of Gangelt	
24	19 November 1943	19:30	Lancaster	northeast of Ronse	
25♠	26 November 1943	02:20	Halifax	north of Prüm	
26♠	26 November 1943	02:42	Halifax	southeast of Darmstadt	
27♠	26 November 1943	02:45	Lancaster	12 km (7.5 mi) Brandau, south of Darmstadt	Lancaster JB221/No. 97 Squadron RAF
28♠	26 November 1943	19:24	Lancaster	south-southwest of Liège	Lancaster DV285/No. 101 Squadron RAF
29♠	26 November 1943	19:30	Halifax	Hermeskeil	
30	20 December 1943	19:26	Halifax	Mayen	
31	20 December 1943	19:45	Halifax	Dachsenhausen	
32	20 February 1944	05:40	Lancaster	12 km (7.5 mi) north of Dessau	
33	24 February 1944	21:36	four-engined bomber	Brieg	
34	24 February 1944	21:48	four-engined bomber	Marling	
35	15 March 1944	22:10	four-engined bomber	southeast of Saint-Dizier	
36	15 March 1944	22:41	four-engined bomber	northeast of Lure	
37	22 June 1944	01:14	Lancaster	18 km (11 mi) east-southeast of Turnhout	Lancaster ME782/No. 630 Squadron RAF

=== Awards ===
- Iron Cross (1939) 2nd and 1st class
- Honour Goblet of the Luftwaffe (Ehrenpokal der Luftwaffe) on 8 May 1943 as Oberleutnant and Staffelkapitän
- German Cross in Gold on 1 August 1943 as Hauptmann in the 6./Nachtjagdgeschweder 1
- Knight's Cross of the Iron Cross on 5 February 1944 as Hauptmann and Gruppenkommandeur of the II./Nachtjagdgeschweder 1
