= Hubertus von Bonin =

German World War II flying ace (1911–1943)

- Hubertus von Bonin in the Second World War
- Born: 3 August 1911; Potsdam, Province of Brandenburg, Kingdom of Prussia, German Empire
- Died: 15 December 1943 (aged 32) near Haradok, Byelorussian SSR, Soviet Union (now Belarus)
- Cause of death: Killed in action
- Relatives: Bogislaw von Bonin; Eckart-Wilhelm von Bonin
- Military career
- Allegiance: Nazi Germany
- Branch: Luftwaffe
- Service years: 1932–1943
- Rank: Oberstleutnant (lieutenant colonel)
- Units: JG 51, JG 52, JG 54
- Commands: III./JG 52, JG 54
- Conflicts: See battles: Spanish Civil War; World War II Battle of France Battle of Britain Eastern Front Operation Barbarossa First Battle of Kharkov Second Battle of Kharkov Battle of Kursk
- Awards: Spanish Cross in Gold with Swords; Knight's Cross of the Iron Cross

Hubertus von Bonin (3 August 1911 – 15 December 1943) was a German Luftwaffe military aviator during the Spanish Civil War and World War II, a fighter ace listed with 77 enemy aircraft shot down. He claimed four victories in the Spanish Civil War, and during World War II, 64 on the Eastern Front and nine on the Western Front.

Born in Potsdam, von Bonin volunteered for service with the Condor Legion during the Spanish Civil War where he commanded the 3. Staffel (3rd squadron) of Jagdgruppe 88 (J/88—88th Fighter Group). Following service in Spain, von Bonin was posted to Jagdgeschwader 26 "Schlageter" (JG 26—26th Fighter Wing). In January 1940, he was appointed Gruppenkommandeur (group commander) of I. Gruppe (1st group) of Jagdgeschwader 54 (JG 54—54th Fighter Wing). He then served as a flight instructor before taking command of III. Gruppe of Jagdgeschwader 52 (JG 52—52nd Fighter Wing) on the Eastern Front. Von Bonin was awarded the Knight's Cross of the Iron Cross on 17 November 1942 after 51 aerial victories claimed. In July 1943, he was appointed Geschwaderkommodore (wing commander) of JG 54. Von Bonin was killed in action in aerial combat on 15 December 1943 near Haradok.

== Early life and career ==
Von Bonin was born on 3 August 1911 in Potsdam in the Province of Brandenburg, Kingdom of Prussia within the German Empire. He was the son of Bogislaw von Bonin and his wife Mathilde, a daughter of Adolf von Bülow. His older brother, Bogislaw served in the Army and later in the Amt Blank, a predecessor of the Federal Ministry of Defence. His two younger brothers also served in the Luftwaffe, Jürgen-Oskar was killed in action on 8 February 1942, while serving as an observer in a Transportgeschwader (air transport wing). Another brother, Eckart-Wilhelm, became a night fighter pilot with 37 aerial victories who survived the war.

In October 1932, von Bonin attended the Military School Dresden. Among his classmates were Werner Mölders, Günther Freiherr von Maltzahn, Joachim Pötter, Hans-Henning Freiherr von Beust, Arved Crüger, Gerhard Kollewe and Wolfgang Schellmann. On 15 March 1937, I. Gruppe (1st group) of Jagdgeschwader 334 (JG 334—334th Fighter Wing) was created at Wiesbaden-Erbenheim Airfield and headed by Hauptmann Hubert Merhart von Bernegg. Initially, the Gruppe was created without 3. Staffel (3rd squadron) which was formed on 1 July and placed under the command of von Bonin. The Gruppe was equipped with the Arado Ar 68 E. In early 1938, they received the then new Messerschmitt Bf 109 D-1.

Von Bonin transferred to the Condor Legion on 30 November 1938 and command of 3. Staffel then passed on to Hauptmann Lothar von Jansen. Von Bonin replaced Hauptmann Mölders, his former classmate at the Military School Dresden, as Staffelkapitän (Squadron Leader) of the 3. Staffel of Jagdgruppe 88 (J/88—88th Fighter Group) on 5 December 1938. During the course of the Spanish Civil War, he claimed four Republican fighter aircraft shot down, including a Curtiss P-36 Hawk on 6 March which was J/88's 314th and last aerial victory. For his service in Spain, he was awarded the Spanish Cross in Gold with Swords (Spanienkreuz in Gold mit Schwertern) on 14 April 1939.

After his return from Spain, von Bonin took command of the 5. Staffel of Jagdgeschwader 26 "Schlageter" (JG 26—26th Fighter Wing) on 28 June 1939. He took over command from Hauptmann Herwig Knüppel who was given command of II. Gruppe of JG 26 to which 5. Staffel was subordinated. At the time, II. Gruppe was based at Düsseldorf Airfield and was equipped with the Bf 109 E-1. On 25 August, a week before the outbreak of World War II, the Gruppe was ordered to Bönninghardt, an airfield southwest of Wesel, close to Germany's western border.

== World War II ==
World War II in Europe began on Friday 1 September 1939 when German forces invaded Poland. Based in Bönninghardt, the Gruppe initially flew fighter protection during the "Phoney War" along the Belgian and Dutch border without claiming any aerial victories. On 1 November, II. Gruppe was ordered to Werl where elements were split off to form the nucleus of the newly created III. Gruppe of JG 26. On 1 January 1940, von Bonin was transferred and appointed Gruppenkommandeur (Group Commander) of the I. Gruppe of Jagdgeschwader 54 (JG 54—54th Fighter Wing). He replaced Major Hans-Jürgen von Cramon-Taubadel who was transferred. On 10 May, German forces launched the attack on France, Belgium, Luxembourg and the Netherlands which became the Battle of France. At the time, I. Gruppe was based at Eutingen im Gäu near Horb am Neckar patrolling the German front along the Upper Rhine and Alsace. According to Mathews and Foreman, von Bonin claimed his first aerial victory of World War II the following day, which was not confirmed. Without seeing much further action, I. Gruppe was ordered to Vitry-en-Artois Airfield on 28 May where they fought in the Battle of Dunkirk. On 5 June, German forced launched Fall Rot (Case Red), the second phase of the conquest of France. I. Gruppe supported the left wing of Army Group B's advance. On 6 June, the Gruppe moved to an airfield at Cramont, approximately 10 kilometers (6.2 miles) east-northeast of Abbeville. Two days later, von Bonin shot down two Armée de l'Air (French Air Force) Bloch MB.150 fighters near Pontoise.

On 18 June, I. Gruppe was withdrawn from the combat area of Army Group B and ordered to Châteaudun Airfield before moving to Eindhoven Airfield in the Netherlands on 26 June for a period of rest and equipment overhaul. The following day, a Royal Air Force (RAF) flight of Bristol Blenheim bombers was intercepted, and four bombers were claimed shot down, including three by von Bonin. The Gruppe stayed in Eindhoven until 15 July when they moved to Schiphol Airfield. On 26 July, the unit was ordered closer to the English Channel and was then based at an airfield near Campagne-lès-Guines to participate in Battle of Britain. On 25 August, von Bonin was credited with the destruction of a RAF Supermarine Spitfire fighter. He claimed a further Spitfire and a Hawker Hurricane fighter east of Southend-on-Sea on 5 September while escorting Luftwaffe bombers attacking RAF ground targets. Von Bonin was credited with his last aerial victory over the RAF on 11 September when he claimed a Spitfire shot down 20 kilometers (12 miles) north of Dungeness. On 23 September, I. Gruppe was withdrawn from the English Channel and ordered to Jever Airfield where the Gruppe was again replenished. At Jever, the Gruppe flew fighter patrols over the German Bight.

On 29 April 1941, von Bonin had a taxiing accident in his Bf 109 (Werknummer 2055—factory number) while based at Wesermünde, present-day part of Bremerhaven. The aircraft sustained 10% damage.

=== Eastern Front and instructor ===
Operation Barbarossa, the German invasion of the Soviet Union, began on 22 June 1941. In the fortnight prior, JG 54 had been moved to an airfield in Lindenthal near Rautenberg, East Prussia, present-day Uslowoje in Kaliningrad Oblast. Tasked with supporting Army Group North in its advance through the Baltic states towards Leningrad, the unit began combat operations shortly afterwards. On 30 June, von Bonin was transferred to take command of Jagdfliegerschule 4, the fighter pilot school in Fürth. Command of I. Gruppe passed on to Hauptmann Erich von Selle. Already on 11 July, von Bonin was given command of II. Gruppe of Jagdgeschwader 51 (JG 51—51st Fighter Wing) after its former commander, Hauptmann Josef Fözö was injured in a take-off accident. On 8 August, he was replaced by Oberleutnant Erich Hohagen.

III./JG 52 emblem

On 1 October 1941, he then took command of the III. Gruppe of Jagdgeschwader 52 (JG 52—52nd Fighter Wing) on the Eastern Front. At the time of his posting to JG 52, III. Gruppe was based at Poltava and supporting the 17th Army in its assault on Kharkov, leading up to the First Battle of Kharkov. Under his leadership, III. Gruppe of JG 52 became the most successful fighter unit of the Luftwaffe. Von Bonin claimed his first aerial victory with JG 52 on 29 April 1942. That day, he shot down a Yakovlev Yak-1 fighter. III. Gruppe had just relocated to Zürichtal, a small village at the Inhul in the former German settlement west of Feodosia in the Crimea. On 12 May, III. Gruppe was ordered to relocate to an airfield named Kharkov-Rogan, 10 kilometers (6.2 miles) east of Kharkov where they participated in the Second Battle of Kharkov. Over the next weeks, III. Gruppe was moved several times. On 19 May, the Gruppe moved to Barvinkove where they stayed until 12 June mostly fighting over the encircled Soviet forces in the Izium salient. They were then ordered to Belgorod and to Grakowo, located approximately halfway between Kharkov and Kupiansk, on 22 June. On 26 June, III. Gruppe then moved to Bely Kolodez where they stayed until 3 July. According to Prien, Stemmer, Rodeike and Bock, von Bonin claimed seven aerial victories between 9 May to 30 June which were not documented.

On 28 June, German forces had launched Case Blue, the strategic summer offensive in southern Russia. On 7 July, Army Group A began their advance towards the oil fields in the Caucasus. On 13 August, III. Gruppe had reached Mineralnye Vody in the North Caucasus region. In mid-August, von Bonin was ordered to detach a small Kommando (commando) under the command of Oberleutnant Hermann Graf. On 23 August, von Bonin claimed a Polikarpov I-16 fighter and a Douglas A-20 Havoc, also known as a Boston, taking his total to 19 aerial victories. On 27 August, III. Gruppe reached an airfield named Gonschtakowka located north-northeast of Mozdok on the Terek. There, von Bonin claimed two Lavochkin-Gorbunov-Gudkov LaGG-3 fighters and a Boston bomber shot down on 30 August. On the next two days, he shot down one LaGG-3 fighter on each day taking his total to 24. On 2 September, von Bonin was credited with a Polikarpov I-153 fighter and two Boston bombers.

On 19 September, III. Gruppe reached an airfield named Soldatskaya, west of Mozdok. The Gruppe would remain here until 1 January 1943 but would also use airfields at Mozdok and Digora. He was awarded the German Cross in Gold (Deutsches Kreuz in Gold) on 27 October 1942. On 1 November, von Bonin became an "ace-in-a-day" claiming a La-5, a MiG-3, and two LaGG-3 fighters plus an Il-2 ground attack aircraft, taking his total to 46 aerial victories. On 13 December, von Bonin claimed two Yak-1 fighters, his last aerial victories of 1942, taking his total to 56. A week later, on 21 December, von Bonin received the Knight's Cross of the Iron Cross (Ritterkreuz des Eisernen Kreuzes). Von Bonin claimed his next aerial victories in late April 1943. III. Gruppe had been ordered to Taman on the Kuban on 1 April. On 29 April, he shot down two LaGG-3 fighters. His last claim with JG 52 was filed on 29 May when he shot down a LaGG-3 fighter.

=== Wing commander and death ===
Emblem of JG 54

On 5 July 1943, Oberstleutnant Hannes Trautloft, the Geschwaderkommodore (wing commander) of JG 54, was transferred to the staff of the General der Jagdflieger (General of Fighters), an office held by Generalmajor Adolf Galland. In consequence, von Bonin was transferred and assumed command of JG 54 on 6 July 1943. At the time, the Geschwaderstab (headquarters unit) of JG 54 was based at Ziverskaya and subordinated to Luftflotte 1 (Air Fleet 1), supporting Army Group North. Prior to this posting, von Bonin had just recently married. Further south, German forces had launched Operation Citadel on 5 July, the failed attempt to eliminate the Kursk salient that initiated the Battle of Kursk. In support of this offensive, JG 54 moved to Oryol on 9 July, fighting on the northern pincer of Generaloberst Walter Model's 9th Army.

In October, the Geschwaderstab moved to Vitebsk. On 15 December, von Bonin claimed two Il-2 ground attack aircraft shot down northeast of Gorodok (now Haradok, Belarus). Von Bonin had attacked a flight of six Il-2 ground attack aircraft and their fighter escort. In this encounter, he was shot down and killed in action in his Focke-Wulf Fw 190 A-5 (Werknummer 2600) east of Gorodok. Command of JG 54 initially remained vacant until Oberstleutnant Anton Mader was appointed Geschwaderkommodore on 28 January 1944.

== Summary of career ==
=== Aerial victory claims ===
According to US historian David T. Zabecki, von Bonin was credited with 77 aerial victories. This is the same number of aerial victories listed by Schreier. Spick also lists him with 77 aerial victories claimed in an unknown number combat missions. This figure includes four aerial victories during the Spanish Civil War, nine during the Battle of France and Britain and further 64 aerial victories on the Eastern Front. Mathews and Foreman, authors of Luftwaffe Aces—Biographies and Victory Claims, researched the German Federal Archives and found documentation for 65 aerial victory claims. This number includes four claims during the Spanish Civil War, eight over the Western Allies, and 53 on the Eastern Front.

Victory claims were logged to a map-reference (PQ = Planquadrat), for example "PQ 44283". The Luftwaffe grid map (Jägermeldenetz) covered all of Europe, western Russia and North Africa and was composed of rectangles measuring 15 minutes of latitude by 30 minutes of longitude, an area of about 360 square miles (930 km^{2}). These sectors were then subdivided into 36 smaller units to give a location area 3 km × 4 km (1.9 mi × 2.5 mi) in size.

Chronicle of aerial victories
This and the ♠ (Ace of spades) indicates those aerial victories which made von Bonin an "ace-in-a-day", a term which designates a fighter pilot who has shot down five or more airplanes in a single day. This and the – (dash) indicates unconfirmed aerial victory claims for which von Bonin did not receive credit. This and the ? (question mark) indicates information discrepancies listed by Prien, Stemmer, Rodeike, Bock, Mathews and Foreman.
Claim	Date	Time	Type	Location	Claim	Date	Time	Type	Location
– 2. Staffel of Jagdgruppe 88 – Spanish Civil War
1	29 December 1938	—	I-16		3	3 February 1939	—	Curtiss	
2	17 January 1939	—	I-16		4	6 March 1939	—	Curtiss	
– Stab I. Gruppe of Jagdgeschwader 54 – Battle of France — 10 May – 25 June 1940
— ? (Note: This unconfirmed claim is not listed by Prien, Stemmer, Rodeike and Bock.)	11 May 1940	—	unknown		2? (Note: This claim is not listed by Mathews and Foreman.)	8 June 1940	12:50	MB.150	Pontoise
1	8 June 1940	12:50	MB.150	Pontoise					
– Stab I. Gruppe of Jagdgeschwader 54 – At the Channel and over England — 26 June – 23 September 1940
3	27 June 1940	15:15	Blenheim		7	5 September 1940	16:25	Spitfire	
4	27 June 1940	15:20	Blenheim		8	5 September 1940	16:30	Hurricane	east of Southend
5	27 June 1940	15:30	Blenheim		9	11 September 1940	17:35	Spitfire	20 km (12 mi) north of Dungeness
6	25 August 1940	20:10	Spitfire						
– Stab III. Gruppe of Jagdgeschwader 52 – Eastern Front — 29 April 1942 – 3 February 1943
10?	29 April 1942	—	Yak-1						
According to Prien, Stemmer, Rodeike and Bock, aerial victories 11 to 17 claimed between 9 May to 30 June were not documented. These seven claims are not listed by Mathews and Foreman.
18	23 August 1942	11:35	I-16	PQ 44283	38	31 October 1942	10:34	R-5	PQ 44572 vicinity of Jelenskiy
19	23 August 1942	11:40	Boston	PQ 54314 vicinity of Makowkin	39	31 October 1942	10:35	MiG-1	PQ 44652
20	30 August 1942	10:12	LaGG-3	PQ 54323 vicinity of Makowkin	40	31 October 1942	13:50? (Note: According to Mathews and Foreman claimed at 13:49.)	Il-2	PQ 44724
21	30 August 1942	10:30	Boston	PQ 54314	41	31 October 1942	14:05	Pe-2	PQ 34762
22	30 August 1942	17:04	LaGG-3	PQ 54342, east of Mozdok; 10 km (6.2 mi) south of Stalingrad	42♠	1 November 1942	13:28	La-5	PQ 44853
23	31 August 1942	16:56	LaGG-3	PQ 59313	43♠	1 November 1942	13:30	LaGG-3	PQ 44834
24	1 September 1942	15:30	LaGG-3	PQ 54343	44♠	1 November 1942	15:22	LaGG-3	PQ 44763
25	2 September 1942	12:05? (Note: According to Mathews and Foreman claimed at 12:00.)	I-153	PQ 4445	45♠	1 November 1942	15:22? (Note: According to Mathews and Foreman claimed at 15:23.)	Il-2	PQ 44724
26	2 September 1942	15:02	Boston	PQ 44421	46♠	1 November 1942	15:25	MiG-3	PQ 44853
27	2 September 1942	15:03	Boston	PQ 44421	47	2 November 1942	12:52	LaGG-3	PQ 44872
28	4 September 1942	15:25	Boston	PQ 44372	48	2 November 1942	12:55? (Note: According to Mathews and Foreman claimed at 14:55.)	LaGG-3	PQ 44872
29	7 September 1942	17:05	I-153	PQ 44357	49	17 November 1942	13:56	MiG-3	PQ 44841
30	10 September 1942	16:36	LaGG-3	PQ 44464 south of Mozdok	50	17 November 1942	14:09	Il-2	PQ 44752, south of Salugarden
31	13 September 1942	16:58	I-16	PQ 44374	51	28 November 1942	13:54	Boston	PQ 44734
32	28 September 1942	15:55	Boston	PQ 44524 vicinity of Malgobek	52	28 November 1942	13:54	Boston	PQ 44722
33	11 October 1942	11:32	Yak-1	PQ 44574 south of Sagopschin	53	28 November 1942	13:55	Boston	PQ 44733
34	13 October 1942	11:36	Yak-1	PQ 44721 east of Kurp	54	28 November 1942	14:03	Il-2	PQ 44764
35	25 October 1942	12:27	La-5	PQ 44721 south of Elkhotovo	55	13 December 1942	13:26	Yak-1	PQ 44261
36	30 October 1942	13:33	LaGG-3	PQ 44714	56	13 December 1942	13:27	Yak-1	PQ 44252
37	30 October 1942	13:34	LaGG-3	PQ 44714					
– Stab III. Gruppe of Jagdgeschwader 52 – Eastern Front — 4 February – 29 June 1943
57?	28 April 1943	16:51	LaGG-3	PQ 34 Ost 86114	62	26 May 1943	17:45	LaGG-3	PQ 34 Ost 75264, southwest of Krymskaja east of Nowo-Bakanskoja
58	29 April 1943	12:58	LaGG-3	PQ 34 Ost 85144 vicinity of Abinsk	63	27 May 1943	18:04	Il-2 m.H. (Note: The "m.H." refers to an Ilyushin Il-2 with rear gunner (mit Heckschütze).)	PQ 34 Ost 76863 south of Bakanskij
59	29 April 1943	12:58	LaGG-3	PQ 34 Ost 85144 vicinity of Abinsk	64	27 May 1943	18:12	Il-2 m.H.	PQ 34 Ost 75232, north of Krymskaja
60	3 May 1943	16:58	Spitfire	PQ 34 Ost 85144, west of Abinskaja vicinity of Abinsk	65	28 May 1943	18:00	LaGG-3	PQ 34 Ost 75232, north of Krymskaja
61	26 May 1943	17:43	LaGG-3	PQ 34 Ost 85142, southeast of Krymskaja vicinity of Beregowoj					
– Stab of Jagdgeschwader 54 – Eastern Front — 6 July – 15 December 1943
66	14 July 1943	14:08	LaGG-3	PQ 35 Ost 54474; 25 km (16 mi) west-northwest of Bolkhov	67	14 September 1943	12:11? (Note: According to Mathews and Foreman claimed at 16:10 over a Bell P-39 Airacobra.)	Yak-9?	PQ 35 Ost 25661; 25 km (16 mi) east of Schatalowka
According to Prien, Stemmer, Rodeike and Bock, aerial victories 68 and 69 claimed in late September were not documented. These two claims are not listed by Mathews and Foreman.
70	9 October 1943	16:10	P-39	PQ 35 Ost 06191	72	15 December 1943	11:19	Il-2	northeast of Gorodok
71	12 October 1943	13:35	La-5	PQ 35 Ost 15541 south of Lenin	73	15 December 1943	11:20	Il-2	northeast of Gorodok

=== Awards ===
- Spanish Cross in Gold with Swords (14 April 1939)
- Iron Cross (1939) 2nd and 1st Class
- German Cross in Gold on 27 October 1942 as Major in the III./Jagdgeschwader 52
- Knight's Cross of the Iron Cross on 21 December 1942 as Major and Gruppenkommandeur of the III./Jagdgeschwader 52

== Notes ==
Military offices
Preceded by Oberst Hannes Trautloft	Commander of Jagdgeschwader 54 Grünherz; 6 July 1943 – 15 December 1943	Succeeded by Oberstleutnant Anton Mader
