= Siegfried Schnell =

German World War II flying ace

- Born: 23 January 1916; Zielenzig, Brandenburg, German Empire
- Died: 25 February 1944 (aged 28) near Narva, Estonia
- Cause of death: Killed in action
- Military career
- Allegiance: Nazi Germany
- Branch: Luftwaffe
- Service years: 1936–1944
- Rank: Major (posthumous)
- Nickname: Wumm
- Units: JG 2, JG 54
- Commands: III./JG 54, IV./JG 54
- Conflicts: See battles World War II: Battle of France; Battle of Britain; Channel Dash; Dieppe Raid; Western Front; Narva †
- Awards: Knight's Cross of the Iron Cross with Oak Leaves

Siegfried Schnell (23 January 1916 – 25 February 1944) was a German military aviator who served in the Luftwaffe during World War II. As a fighter ace, he was credited with 93—that is, 93 aerial combat encounters resulting in the destruction of the enemy aircraft—claimed in an unknown number of combat missions. He had three victories on the Eastern Front and 90 over the Western Allies, including 12 four-engine bombers.

Born in Zielenzig, Schnell joined the Luftwaffe in 1936. At the start of World war II, he served with Jagdgeschwader 2 "Richthofen". He claimed his first aerial victory on 14 May 1940 during the Battle of France. On 7 November, he claimed his 20th aerial victory for which he was awarded the Knight's Cross of the Iron Cross. On 1 July 1941, he was made a Staffelkapitän (squadron leader). He claimed his 45th aerial victory on 9 July for which he was awarded the Knight's Cross of the Iron Cross with Oak Leaves, it was Germany's highest military decoration at the time of its presentation to Schnell. (Note: Until late September 1941, the Knight's Cross of the Iron Cross with Oak Leaves was second only to the Grand Cross of the Iron Cross (Großkreuz des Eisernen Kreuzes), which was awarded only to senior commanders for winning a major battle or campaign, in the military order of the Third Reich. Its place as the highest military order was officially surpassed on 28 September 1941 by the Knight's Cross of the Iron Cross with Oak Leaves and Swords (Ritterkreuz des Eisernen Kreuzes mit Eichenlaub und Schwertern), however the first presentation of the Swords to Adolf Galland had been made prior to this date on 21 June 1941.)

On 1 May 1943, Schnell was appointed Gruppenkommandeur (group commander) of III. Gruppe of Jagdgeschwader 54 (JG 54—54th Fighter Wing) which was fighting in Defense of the Reich. On 1 February 1944, he was given command of IV. Gruppe of JG 54, based near Leningrad on the Eastern Front. Schnell was killed in action on 25 February 1944 during the Soviet Narva offensive when he was shot down by an opposing fighter near Narva, Estonia.

== Early life and career ==
Schnell was born on 23 January 1916 in Zielenzig, at the time in the Province of Brandenburg of the German Empire. A keen glider-pilot, he joined the Luftwaffe in 1936, and by the start of the war in 1939, he was a Feldwebel serving with 4. Staffel (4th squadron) of Jagdgeschwader 2 "Richthofen", named after the World War I fighter ace Manfred von Richthofen, under the command of Oberleutnant Hans "Assi" Hahn. (Note: For an explanation of Luftwaffe unit designations see Organisation of the Luftwaffe during World War II.) The Staffel was subordinated to II. Gruppe (2nd group) which had been created on 15 December 1939 at Zerbst and placed under the command of Hauptmann Wolfgang Schellmann. The unit was formed from elements of both I. Gruppe of JG 2 and I. Gruppe of Jagdgeschwader 3 (JG 3—3rd Fighter Wing). The Gruppe was officially declared operational on 15 January 1940.

== World War II ==
At the start of the Battle of France, II. Gruppe of JG 2 was deployed on the northern sector of Army Group B and had been ordered to an airfield at Hamminkeln on 11 May. Initially subordinated to the IV. Fliegerkorps (4th Air Corps), the Gruppe flew fighter escort missions on the first three days of the campaign for Lehrgeschwader 1 (LG 1—1st Demonstration Wing), Kampfgeschwader 27 (KG 27—27th Bomber Wing) and Sturzkampfgeschwader 3 (StG 3—3rd Dive Bomber Wing) attacking targets in the Netherlands. On 14 May, II. Gruppe was ordered to Peer in Belgium where the Gruppe was placed under the command of the Stab of Jagdgeschwader 26 "Schlageter" (JG 26—26th Fighter Wing). That day, Schnell claimed his first aerial victory, a French Bloch 152 fighter.

Following the Armistice of 22 June 1940, combat operation concluded on 25 June. On 27 June, II. Gruppe was ordered to Beaumont-le-Roger, patrolling the English Channel and participated in the occupation of Guernsey on 1 July. Schnell claimed his first aerial victory during the Battle of Britain on 29 July when he shot down a Bristol Blenheim bomber northwest of Le Havre. On 7 November, off the Isle of Wight, as operations were slowing down and recently commissioned as a Leutnant (on 1 November), he claimed his 20th aerial victory. For this feat he was awarded the Knight's Cross of the Iron Cross (Ritterkreuz des Eisernen Kreuzes) on 9 November.

=== Squadron leader ===
The focus of the airwar shifted in the next year to the Eastern Front, however Schnell stayed with JG 2 defending the West. On 1 July 1941, he was appointed as Staffelkapitän (squadron leader) of 9. Staffel of JG 2. He succeeded Oberleutnant Carl-Hans Röders who was killed in action on 23 June. On 3 July, III. Gruppe moved to St. Pol-Brias where it would be based for more than four months. That day, Schnell claimed a Supermarine Spitfire fighter shot down east of Gravelines, his first aerial victory as Staffelkapitän. The following day, he was credited with four further Spitfires shot down.

Soon after, he shot down nine Spitfires in just two days (8 – 9 July) to reach his 45th victory and was awarded the Knight's Cross of the Iron Cross with Oak Leaves (Ritterkreuz des Eisernen Kreuzes mit Eichenlaub), at the time being one of the top pilots in JG 2. He continued to score consistently as the Royal Air Force (RAF) mounted heavier strikes into France, and temporarily held command of III. Gruppe from 9 December 1941 to the following 28 January while Gruppenkommandeur (group commander) Hans "Assi" Hahn was on leave. Schnell claimed a Handley Page Hampden bomber during Operation Donnerkeil. The objective of this operation was to give the German battleships Scharnhorst and Gneisenau and the heavy cruiser Prinz Eugen fighter protection in the breakout from Brest to Germany. The Channel Dash operation (11–13 February 1942) by the Kriegsmarine was codenamed Operation Cerberus by the Germans. In support of this, the Luftwaffe, formulated an air superiority plan dubbed Operation Donnerkeil for the protection of the three German capital ships. Over the Dieppe Raid on 19 August 1942, he shot down five Spitfires to reach his 70th victory, making him an "ace-in-a-day" for the second time. Schnell was promoted to Hauptmann of the Reserves on 1 February 1943.

=== Group commander ===
After that his scoring rate slowed down as he focussed more on administration and command, and he led his unit in the changeover onto the new Focke-Wulf Fw 190—a very rugged dogfighter. In a misguided idea by High Command to rotate the fighter Gruppen between Western and Eastern Fronts, III. Gruppe of Jagdgeschwader 54 (JG 54—54th Fighter Wing) was transferred from the Eastern Front back to Germany for Defence of the Reich. Hauptmann Schnell, was given command of the unit on 1 May 1943 to train and lead the pilots in high-altitude interception rather than the low-level brawling they were used to on the Eastern Front. He had taken command of the Gruppe from Major Reinhard Seiler who was transferred. Command of his former 9. Staffel of JG 2 had already been passed on to Oberleutnant Josef Wurmheller on 1 April.

Late on 22 June, III. Gruppe moved from Oldenburg to Deelen Airfield in the Netherlands. On 8 July, the Gruppe relocated again, moving from Deelen to Amsterdam-Schiphol Airfield. On 11 January 1944, III. Gruppe defended against a raid flown by the United States Army Air Forces resulting in eleven Boeing B-17 Flying Fortress bombers shot down, including three by Schnell.

On 1 February 1944, he was given command of IV. Gruppe of JG 54, based near Leningrad, and he arrived on 11 February. He replaced Hauptmann Rudolf Sinner. As mentioned above, command transfers between fronts were rare, given the markedly different combat conditions, and unfortunately Schnell was not lucky to be able to adapt quickly enough. After less than a month and three further aerial victories, he was shot down and killed in his Messerschmitt Bf 109 G-6 (Werknummer 411675—factory number) over the Russian offensive for Narva on 25 February 1944. Posthumously, he was promoted to Major of the Reserves. He was succeeded by Hauptmann Gerhard Koall as commander of IV. Gruppe of JG 54.

== Summary of career ==
=== Aerial victory claims ===
According to Spick and Zabecki, Schnell was credited with 93 aerial victories claimed in an unknown number combat missions. This figure includes 23 aerial victories during the Battle of France and Britain, further 64 aerial victories over the Western Front and six more on the Eastern Front. Mathews and Foreman, authors of Luftwaffe Aces — Biographies and Victory Claims, researched the German Federal Archives and found documentation for 83 aerial victory claims, plus two further unconfirmed claims. All of his aerial victories were claimed over the Western Allies and includes ten four-engined bombers.

Victory claims were logged to a map-reference (PQ = Planquadrat), for example "PQ 05 Ost 1176". The Luftwaffe grid map (Jägermeldenetz) covered all of Europe, western Russia and North Africa and was composed of rectangles measuring 15 minutes of latitude by 30 minutes of longitude, an area of about 360 square miles (930 km^{2}). These sectors were then subdivided into 36 smaller units to give a location area 3 km × 4 km (1.9 mi × 2.5 mi) in size.

Chronicle of aerial victories
This and the ♠ (Ace of spades) indicates those aerial victories which made Schnell an "ace-in-a-day", a term which designates a fighter pilot who has shot down five or more airplanes in a single day. This and the – (dash) indicates unconfirmed aerial victory claims for which Schnell did not receive credit. This along with the * (asterisk) indicates an Herausschuss (separation shot)—a severely damaged heavy bomber forced to separate from his combat box which was counted as an aerial victory. This and the ? (question mark) indicates information discrepancies listed by Prien, Stemmer, Rodeike, Bock, Mathews and Foreman.
Claim	Date	Time	Type	Location	Claim	Date	Time	Type	Location
– 4. Staffel of Jagdgeschwader 2 "Richthofen" – Battle of France — 11 May – 25 June 1940
1? (Note: According to Mathews and Foreman, this claim is unconfirmed.)	3 June 1940	—	French fighter	Épernay	2?	3 June 1940	—	French fighter	Épernay
– 4. Staffel of Jagdgeschwader 2 "Richthofen" – At the Channel and over England — 26 June 1940 – 21 June 1941
3	29 July 1940	13:20	Blenheim	northwest of Le Havre					
According to Prien, Stemmer, Rodeike and Bock, Schnell claimed his fourth aerial victory on either 4 or 16 August 1940. This claim is not listed by Mathews and Foreman.
5	30 August 1940	17:50	Spitfire			7 September 1940	17:38	Spitfire	
6	2 September 1940	18:00	Hurricane			8 September 1940	13:15	Hurricane	
According to Prien, Stemmer, Rodeike and Bock, Schnell claimed two aerial victories on either 7 or 8 September 1940, one of which may be unconfirmed. These claims are not listed by Mathews and Foreman.
11	11 September 1940	17:05	Spitfire		17	7 October 1940	13:42	Spitfire	Southampton
12	11 September 1940	17:12	Spitfire		18	6 November 1940	13:40	Spitfire	east of Southampton
13	30 September 1940	17:55	Spitfire	north of the Isle of Portland	19	7 November 1940	15:30	Hurricane	south of the Isle of Wight
14	30 September 1940	18:00	Hurricane	north of the Isle of Portland	20	21 June 1941	16:48	Spitfire	west of Le Touquet
15	7 October 1940	17:55	Spitfire		21	21 June 1941	16:49	Spitfire	west of Le Touquet
16	7 October 1940	13:39	Spitfire	Southampton					
– 4. Staffel of Jagdgeschwader 2 "Richthofen" – On the Western Front — 22–30 June 1941
22	22 June 1941	16:20	Spitfire	Saint-Omer-Gravelines	27	25 June 1941	16:32	Spitfire	Saint-Omer-Gravelines
23	23 June 1941	20:19	Spitfire	Pas-de-Calais	28	25 June 1941	16:40	Spitfire	Saint-Omer-Gravelines
24	23 June 1941	20:20	Blenheim	Pas-de-Calais	29	26 June 1941? (Note: According to Mathews and Foreman, claimed on 25 June 1941.)	11:42	Spitfire	Hazebrouck-Gravelines
25	23 June 1941	20:22	Blenheim	Pas-de-Calais	30	27 June 1941	21:30	Spitfire	Lille-Gravelines
26	24 June 1941	20:44	Spitfire	Gravelines-Ramsgate	31	27 June 1941	21:32	Spitfire	Lille-Gravelines
– 9. Staffel of Jagdgeschwader 2 "Richthofen" – On the Western Front — 1 July – 31 December 1941
32	3 July 1941	15:40	Spitfire	east of Gravelines	45♠	9 July 1941	16:22	Spitfire	
33	4 July 1941	15:05	Spitfire		46	1 September 1941	19:22	Blenheim	Cherbourg
34	4 July 1941	15:07	Spitfire		47	4 September 1941	16:03	Whirlwind	north of Cherbourg
35	4 July 1941	15:15	Spitfire		48	4 September 1941	16:05	Whirlwind	north of Cherbourg
36	4 July 1941	16:43	Spitfire		49	4 September 1941	16:07	Hurricane	north of Cherbourg
37	6 July 1941	14:40	Spitfire		50	18 September 1941	17:37	Spitfire	
38	8 July 1941	06:45	Spitfire	southwest of Bergues	51	18 September 1941	17:40	Spitfire	
39	8 July 1941	15:45? (Note: According to Mathews and Foreman, claimed at 13:45.)	Spitfire		52	12 October 1941	17:10	Spitfire	
40♠	9 July 1941	13:57	Spitfire		53	12 October 1941	17:15	Spitfire	
41♠	9 July 1941	13:59	Spitfire		54	8 November 1941	15:32	Spitfire	
42♠	9 July 1941	14:05	Spitfire		55	8 November 1941	15:35	Spitfire	
43♠	9 July 1941	16:10	Spitfire		56	8 November 1941	15:37	Spitfire	
44♠	9 July 1941	16:20	Spitfire						
– 9. Staffel of Jagdgeschwader 2 "Richthofen" – On the Western Front — 1 January – 31 December 1942
57	3 June 1942	15:27	Spitfire		66♠	19 August 1942	11:38	Spitfire	west of Le Tréport
58	3 June 1942	15:29	Spitfire		67♠	19 August 1942	12:06	Spitfire	northeast of Secqueville
59	3 June 1942	15:34	Spitfire		68♠	19 August 1942	15:32	Spitfire	15 km (9.3 mi) northwest of Dieppe
60	3 June 1942	15:36	Spitfire		69♠	19 August 1942	15:34	Spitfire	10 km (6.2 mi) northwest of Dieppe
61	4 June 1942	12:48	Spitfire		70♠	19 August 1942	15:42	Spitfire	20 km (12 mi) northwest of Dieppe
62	4 June 1942	12:58	Spitfire		71	8 November 1942	12:13	Spitfire	PQ 05 Ost 1176
63	6 June 1942	17:14	Spitfire	Cherbourg-Cap Lévi	72	23 November 1942	13:46	B-17	southwest of Belle Île
64	6 June 1942	17:16	Spitfire	Cherbourg-Cap Lévi	73	23 November 1942	11:52	B-17	southwest of Île de Groix
65	26 June 1942	17:43	Spitfire	Fécamp-Étretat					
– 9. Staffel of Jagdgeschwader 2 "Richthofen" – On the Western Front — 1 January – 1 April 1943
74	3 January 1943	11:42	B-17	PQ 14 West 4869; 10 km (6.2 mi) southwest of Saint-Nazaire	75	3 January 1943	11:47	B-17	PQ 14 West 3877
– Stab III. Gruppe of Jagdgeschwader 54 – Defense of the Reich — 1 May – 31 December 1943
76	21 May 1943	12:38? (Note: According to Mathews and Foreman, claimed at 12:36.)	B-17	PQ 05 Ost S/74/1/1; 7 km (4.3 mi) southeast of Jever	82	27 July 1943	20:12	Spitfire	5 km (3.1 mi) west of Zandvoort
77	21 May 1943	12:52? (Note: According to Mathews and Foreman, claimed at 12:50.)	B-17	PQ 05 Ost S/75/7/2	83	27 July 1943	20:22	Typhoon	20 km (12 mi) west of Haarlem
78	13 June 1943	09:30	B-17	Preetz	84	30 July 1943	10:18	B-17*	PQ 05 Ost S/HM-9 north of Arnhem
79	25 July 1943	15:04	Spitfire	north of Amsterdam; 500 m (1,600 ft) north of Broek	85	30 July 1943	10:37	P-47	PQ 05 Ost S/JK-7 southwest of Dordrecht
80	25 July 1943	15:07	Typhoon	40 km (25 mi) west of Bergen northwest of IJmuiden	86	9 October 1943	14:27	B-17	PQ 05 Ost S/PF-1
81	25 July 1943	20:12	Typhoon	25 km (16 mi) west of Zandvoort					
– Stab III. Gruppe of Jagdgeschwader 54 – Defense of the Reich — 1 January – 11 February 1944
87	11 January 1944	12:00	B-17		—	11 January 1944	—	B-17	
—	11 January 1944	—	B-17						

=== Awards ===
- Iron Cross (1939)
  - 2nd Class (10 June 1940)
  - 1st Class (14 September 1940)
- German Cross in Gold on 16 July 1942 as Oberleutnant in the 9./Jagdgeschwader 52
- Knight's Cross of the Iron Cross with Oak Leaves
  - Knight's Cross on 9 November 1940 as Leutnant and pilot in the II./Jagdgeschwader 2 "Richthofen" (Note: According to Scherzer as Leutnant of the Reserves and pilot in the 4./Jagdgeschwader 2 "Richthofen".)
  - 18th Oak Leaves on 9 July 1941 as Leutnant and pilot in the 9./Jagdgeschwader 2 "Richthofen" (Note: According to Scherzer as Leutnant of the Reserves and Staffelkapitän of the 9./Jagdgeschwader 2 "Richthofen".)
