= Rudolf Rademacher =

German fighter ace and Knight's Cross recipient (1913–1953)

- Rudolf Rademacher
- Born: 19 June 1913; Lüneburg, German Empire
- Died: 13 June 1953 (aged 39); Lüneburg, West Germany
- Military career
- Allegiance: Nazi Germany
- Branch: Luftwaffe
- Rank: Leutnant (second lieutenant)
- Nickname: Rudi
- Units: JG 54, EJG 1, JG 7
- Conflicts: See battles World War II: Eastern Front; Defense of the Reich

Rudolf "Rudi" Rademacher (19 June 1913 – 13 June 1953) was a German military aviator who served in the Luftwaffe during World War II. As a fighter ace, he was credited with 97, potentially up to 126, aerial victories—that is, 97 aerial combat encounters resulting in the destruction of the enemy aircraft—claimed in over 500 combat missions. The majority of his victories were claimed over the Eastern Front, with sixteen claims over the Western Front, all of which were achieved while flying the Messerschmitt Me 262 jet fighter.

Rademacher was born on 19 June 1913 in Lüneburg, Province of Hanover, a province of the Kingdom of Prussia. He served in the Luftwaffe of Nazi Germany. Following flight training, he was posted to Jagdgeschwader 54 (JG 54—54th Fighter Wing) in 1941, operating on the Eastern Front. He claimed his first aerial victory on 9 January 1942. In March 1943, Rademacher joined Schwarm, flight of four aircraft, headed by Walter Nowotny, the most successful fighter pilot team in the Luftwaffe. In September 1944, he served as a fighter pilot instructor and was awarded the Knight's Cross of the Iron Cross on 30 September 1944. In January 1945, Rademacher was posted to Jagdgeschwader 7 "Nowotny" (JG 7—7th Fighter Wing), the first jet fighter wing. Rademacher died in a glider aircraft crash on 13 June 1953 in Lüneburg.

== World War II ==
On 1 December 1941, Rademacher, holding the rank of Unteroffizier (Staff Sergeant), was posted to 3. Staffel (squadron) of Jagdgeschwader 54 (JG 54—54th Fighter Wing) on the Eastern Front. At the time, 3. Staffel was temporarily commanded by Oberleutnant Max-Hellmuth Ostermann and subordinated to I. Gruppe (1st group) headed by Hauptmann Erich von Selle. On 5 January 1942, Von Selle was transferred and command of the Gruppe was given to Hauptmann Franz Eckerle. At the time, the Gruppe was based at Krasnogvardeysk, present-day Gatchina, southwest of Leningrad, and fighting in the Siege of Leningrad in support of Army Group North. Rademacher claimed his first aerial victory on 9 January 1942. That day, the Gruppe flew missions in the area of the Volkhov, southeast of Leningrad, and to Tosno where Rademacher claimed an Ilyushin Il-2 ground attack aircraft shot down.

On 14 February, Eckerle was shot down behind enemy lines. Initially reported as missing in action, he was replaced by Hauptmann Hans Philipp as commander of I. Gruppe on 17 February. In late February, I. Gruppe predominately flew missions in the area of the Volkhov where Rademacher claimed a Lend-Lease Curtiss P-40 Warhawk fighter shot down on 25 February. (Note: According to Bergström and Mikhailov, Rademacher claimed three Curtiss P-40 Warhawk fighters shot down on 25 February 1942.)

=== Eastern Front ===
As of 1 March 1943, Rademacher transferred to 1. Staffel where joined Walter Nowotny, his wingman Karl Schnörrer, and Anton Döbele, forming a team known as the "chain of devils" (Teufelskette) or the Nowotny Schwarm, which during the course of the war was credited with 524 combined kills, making them the most successful team in the Luftwaffe. In late March, Rademacher fell ill, grounding him for an extensive period. During this time, he was awarded the German Cross in Gold (Deutsches Kreuz in Gold) on 30 April. On 1 April, the Gruppenkommandeur (group commander), Major Hans Philipp, was transferred and temporarily replaced by Hauptmann Gerhard Koall until Major Reinhard Seiler took command on 1 May.

=== Operation Citadel ===
In early July, I. Gruppe of JG 54 was ordered to move to Oryol, in the southern sector of Army Group Centre, where it fought in Operation Citadel which initiated the Battle of Kursk. Subordinated to Luftflotte 6 (Air Fleet 6), the Gruppe began relocating on 2 July and arrived at the airfield name Panikowo, a makeshift airfield created for the attack on the Kursk salient, on 4 July. The next day, the Wehrmacht launched Operation Citadel and I. Gruppe supported the attack of the 9th Army on the northern sector of the salient, escorting bombers of Kampfgeschwader 4, 51 and 53 (KG 4, KG 51 and KG 53—4th, 51st and 53rd Bomber Wing), as well as Junkers Ju 87 dive bombers of Sturzkampfgeschwader 1 (StG 1—1st Dive Bomber Wing) to their target areas. That day, I. Gruppe claimed 59 aerial victories, including seven by Rademacher in the vicinity of Maloarkhangelsk and Kursk, making him an "ace-in-a-day".

The next day, I. Gruppe of JG 54, led by Major Reinhard Seiler, encountered several Lavochkin La-5 and Yakovlev Yak-9 fighters, and Ilyushin Il-2 ground attack aircraft, as well as Bell P-39 Airacobra fighters from the 30 GvIAP (Guards Fighter Aviation Regiment—Gvardeyskiy Istrebitelny Aviatsionny Polk). In the encounter, Rademacher shot down two of the La-5 fighters. In morning of 7 July, Rademacher claimed a Yakovlev Yak-7 fighter shot down. On 13 July, I. Gruppe intercepted a flight of Il-2 ground attack aircraft escorted by Yak-7 fighters of the 20 IAP (Fighter Aviation Regiment—Istrebitelny Aviatsionny Polk). In this encounter, Rademacher shot down three Il-2 ground attack aircraft. On 29 July, Rademacher claimed two Yak-9 fighters shot down, taking his total to 75 and included I. Gruppe's 3,000th claim.

On 1 September 1944, Rademacher was transferred to the 1. Staffel of Jagdgruppe Nord, a fighter pilot training unit later renamed to Ergänzungs-Jagdgeschwader 1 where he served as an instructor. Although not an operational unit, he claimed four heavy bombers and a Republic P-47 Thunderbolt fighter shot down while serving with this unit. On 18 September, Rademacher was shot down in his Fw 190 A-8 (Werknummer 350193—factory number). Forced to bail out, he was wounded in the encounter. On 30 September, he was awarded the Knight's Cross of the Iron Cross (Ritterkreuz des Eisernen Kreuzes) for 81 aerial victories claimed. The presentation was made at the Luftwaffe airfield in Sagan-Küpper, present-day Nowa Kopernia in Żagań County, during his convalescence by Oberst Hannes Trautloft, a former Geschwaderkommodore (wing commander) of JG 54 at the time serving with the staff of the General der Jagdflieger (General of Fighters).

=== Flying the Messerschmitt Me 262 ===
Following a period of convalescence, he joined 11. Staffel of Jagdgeschwader 7 (JG 7—7th Fighter Wing) on 30 January 1945. 11. Staffel was part of III. Gruppe of JG 7 under the command of Major Erich Hohagen. Depending on source, Rademacher claimed between eight and sixteen aerial victories flying the Messerschmitt Me 262 first operational jet fighter, making him one of the top jet-aces of the war. (Note: For a list of Luftwaffe Jet aces see List of German World War II jet aces) According to Morgan and Weal, he was credited with eight aerial victories. While Mathews and Foremann credit him with sixteen aerial victories on the Me 262 jet-fighter.

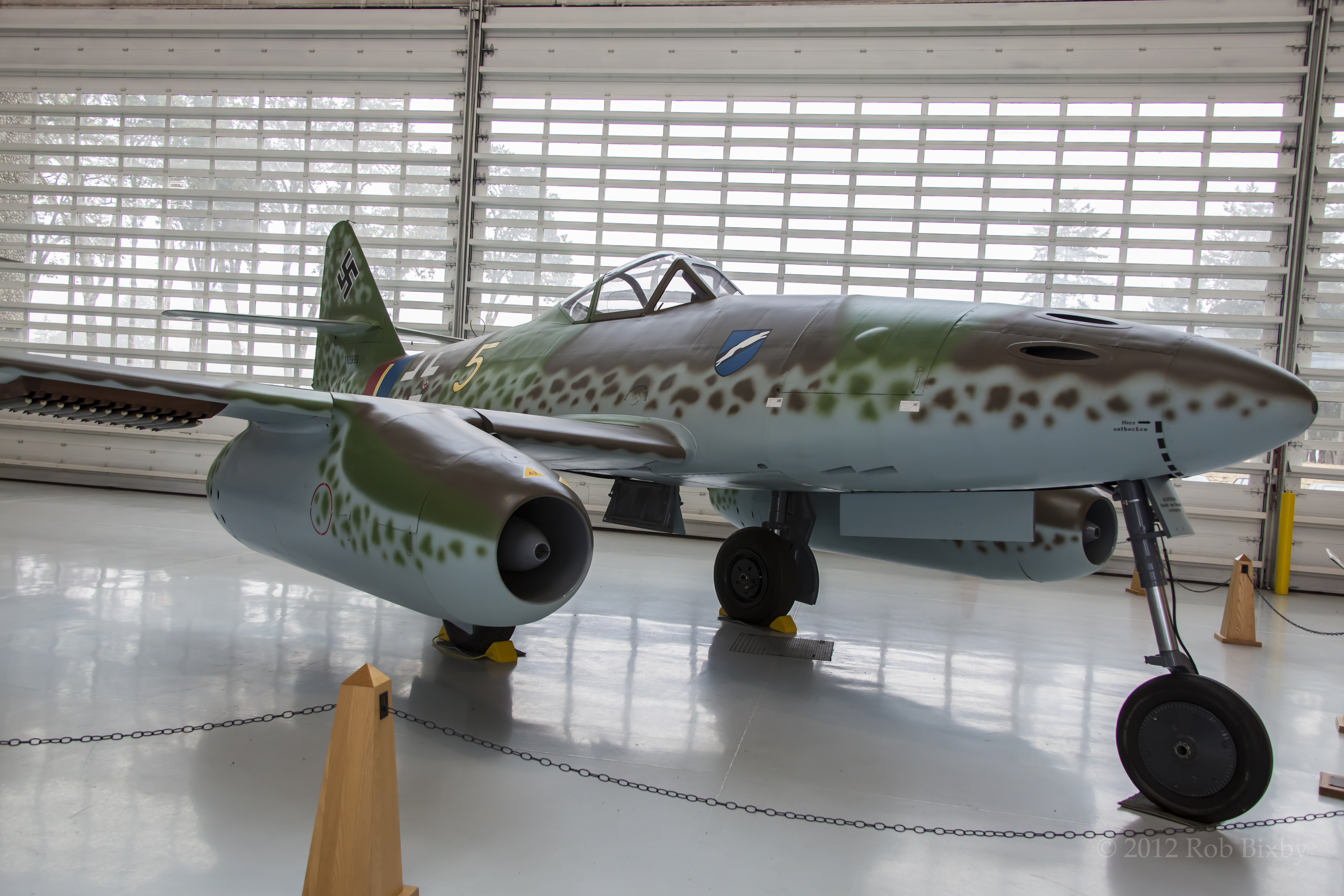
An Me 262 of JG 7 similar to those flown by Rademacher on display at the Evergreen Aviation & Space Museum.

On 1 February 1945, he claimed a Supermarine Spitfire shot down near Braunschweig. While the Allies reported a Hawker Tempest lost in the vicinity of the action. On 3 February 1945, the United States Army Air Forces (USAAF) Eighth Air Force attacked Brabag's synthetic fuel factory at Magdeburg. III. Gruppe of JG 7 was one of the Luftwaffe units scrambled to intercept the bombers. The USAAF lost 23 Boeing B-17 Flying Fortress bombers and seven North American P-51 Mustang fighters in the attack. Rademacher claimed two B-17 bombers shot down that day. On 9 February, over 1,200 heavy bombers of the Eighth Air Force attacked synthetic fuel factories, railroad and other targets. Close to Berlin, III. Gruppe intercepted a formation of B-17 bombers and their fighter escort. In this encounter, Rademacher claimed the destruction of two further B-17 bombers. On 14 February, Rademacher claimed the destruction of a B-17 bomber on its return flight to England. The intercept was made between Lübeck and Neumünster. On 16 February, III. Gruppe of JG 7 fought 10 to 15 P-51 fighters near Hannover. Following the encounter, Rademacher claimed a P-51 shot down. This claim cannot be confirmed by Allied records as no P-51 loss was recorded in that area of operation.

On 18 March, the Eighth Air Force headed for various railway stations and tank factories in the greater Berlin area with 1,329 heavy bombers, escorted by 632 fighter aircraft. Flying from Parchim Airfield, 37 Me 262 fighters led by Major Theodor Weissenberger took off to intercept the bombers. On this mission, Rademacher shot down a B-17 bomber. The next day, 1,273 heavy bombers from the USAAF 3rd Air Division attacked the synthetic fuel factories. The bombers were intercepted by 28 Me 262 fighters north of Chemnitz. In this encounter, Rademacher claimed an escorting P-51 fighter. On 24 March, the Eighth Air Force flew over 1,700 combat missions in support of Operation Plunder, the crossing of the Rhine. That day, approximately 250 heavy bombers also headed for Berlin to bomb the tank factories close by. The bombers were intercepted by 31 Me 262 fighters near Wittenberg. In this encounter, Rademacher claimed a B-17 bomber. The Eighth Air Force attacked fuel storage sites in areas of Braunschweig, Hamburg and Lauenburg on 25 March. Unable to form a cohesive formation, the Me 262 fighter pilots attacked the bombers individually or in pairs. At 10:20, Rademacher claimed a Herausschuss (separation shot)—a severely damaged heavy bomber forced to separate from his combat box which was counted as an aerial victory—over a Consolidated B-24 Liberator bomber near Lauenburg.

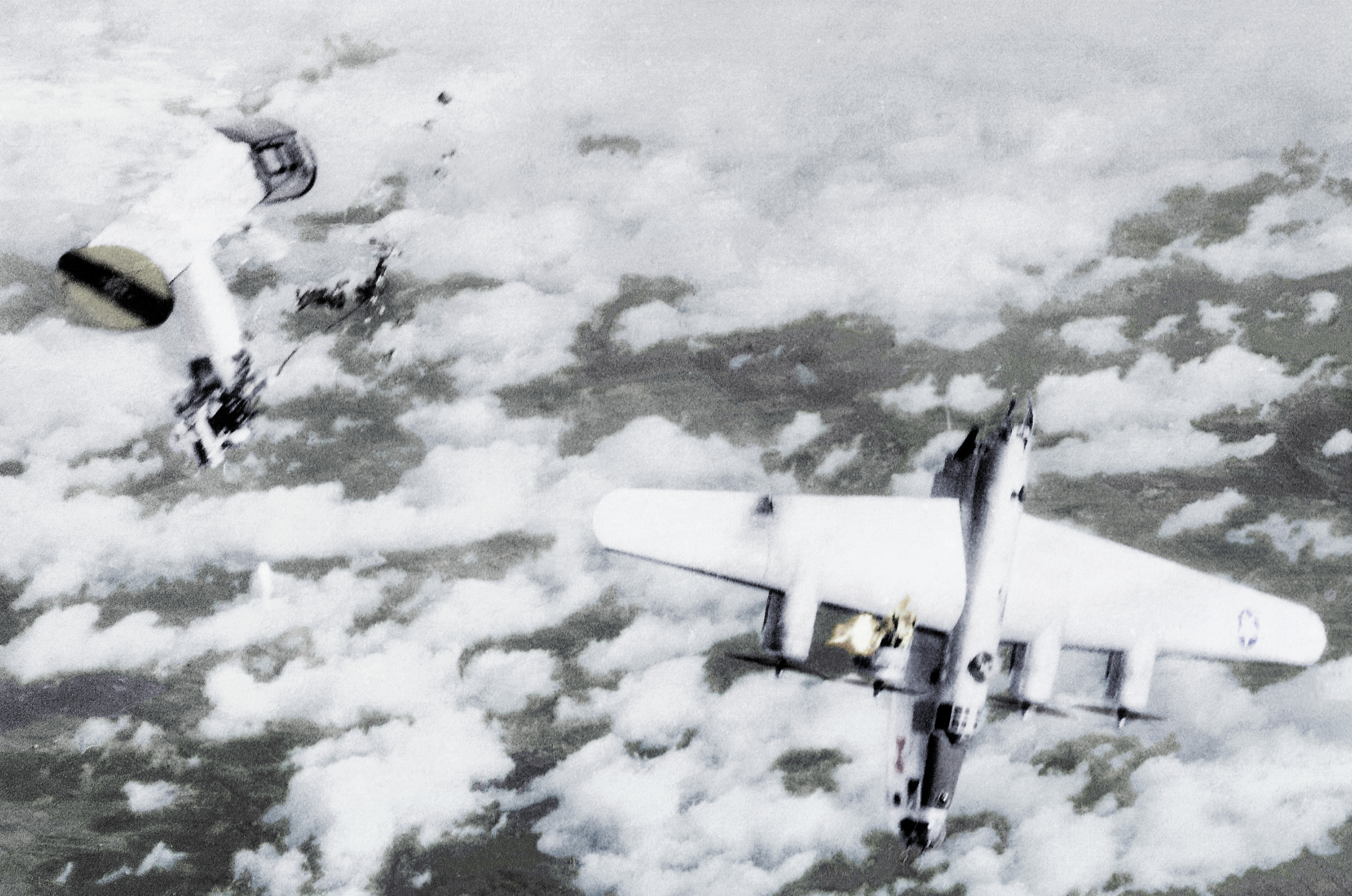
B-24M 44-50838 shot down by Rademacher on 4 April 1945.

On 31 March, 428 Avro Lancaster and Handley Page Halifax bombers of the Royal Air Force (RAF) No. 1 Group and the Royal Canadian Air Force No. 6 Group attacked the U-boat pens and the Blohm+Voss aircraft factory in Hamburg. The bombers were supposed to be escorted by RAF P-51 fighters but had failed to meet up in the Netherlands. The attack force was intercepted by 30 Me 262 fighters from I. and III. Gruppe of JG 7. In the afternoon, the Eighth Air Force lost a few aircraft to Me 262 fighters in combat over Zeitz, Brandenburg and Braunschweig. That day, Rademacher claimed a P-51 fighter aircraft shot down. On 4 April, the USAAF Eighth Air Force dispatched 1,431 heavy bombers, escorted by 850 fighter aircraft, to northern Germany. The bombers targets included the harbor and residential areas of Kiel and Hamburg and five Luftwaffe airfields, including Parchim Airfield where III. Gruppe of JG 7 was based. Defending against this attack, Rademacher shot down a B-24 bomber near Bremen. According to Swopes, the aircraft was Ford B-24M 44-50838 of the 714th Bombardment Squadron, 448th Bombardment Group shot down by Rademacher with R4M unguided air-to-air rockets. Rademacher claimed his last aerial victory on 10 April when he shot down a P-51 fighter aircraft. That day the USAAF Eighth Air Force sent 1,315 heavy bombers on a mission against the Luftwaffe jet aircraft airfields which included airfields at Brandenburg-Briest, Rechlin-Lärz, Oranienburg, Neuruppin, Burg and Parchim.

== Later life ==
Rademacher was killed in a glider crash at Lüneburg on 13 June 1953.

== Summary of career ==
=== Aerial victory claims ===
According to US historian David T. Zabecki, Rademacher was credited with 97 aerial victories. Obermaier also list him with 97 aerial victories, 76 of which claimed over the Eastern Front, including 21 Il-2s and 7 Pe-2s. He also claimed 23 further victories on the Eastern Front without witnesses supporting his claim. According to Spick however, Rademacher is credited with 126 aerial victories, 90 of which claimed over the Eastern Front and 36 in the western theatre of operations, including 10 heavy bombers and a mission-to-claim ratio of 3.97. Mathews and Foreman, authors of Luftwaffe Aces — Biographies and Victory Claims, researched the German Federal Archives and state that he claimed at least 93 aerial victories, at least 77 of which claimed on the Eastern Front and 16 on Western Front, including over 11 four-engined bombers, plus further nine unconfirmed claims. He claimed eleven victories flying the Me 262. The claim that he is attributed with 126 aerial victories cannot be verified through the archives.

Victory claims were logged to a map-reference (PQ = Planquadrat), for example "PQ 0025". The Luftwaffe grid map (Jägermeldenetz) covered all of Europe, western Russia and North Africa and was composed of rectangles measuring 15 minutes of latitude by 30 minutes of longitude, an area of about 360 square miles (930 km^{2}). These sectors were then subdivided into 36 smaller units to give a location area 3 km × 4 km (1.9 mi × 2.5 mi) in size.

Chronicle of aerial victories
This and the ♠ (Ace of spades) indicates those aerial victories which made Rademacher an "ace-in-a-day", a term which designates a fighter pilot who has shot down five or more airplanes in a single day. This and the – (dash) indicates unconfirmed aerial victory claims for which Rademacher did not receive credit. This along with the * (asterisk) indicates an Herausschuss (separation shot)—a severely damaged heavy bomber forced to separate from his combat box which was counted as an aerial victory. This and the ? (question mark) indicates information discrepancies listed by Prien, Stemmer, Rodeike, Bock, Mathews and Foreman.
| Claim | Date | Time | Type | Location | Claim | Date | Time | Type | Location |
– 3. Staffel of Jagdgeschwader 54 – Eastern Front — 6 December 1941 – 30 April 1942
| 1 | 9 January 1942 | 10:30 | Il-2 | 10 km (6.2 mi) northeast of Ostkaja | 7 | 20 March 1942 | 06:40 | I-16 | |
| 2 | 25 February 1942 | 10:57 | P-40 | | — | 4 April 1942 | — | I-16 | |
| — | 4 March 1942 | — | R-5 | | 8 | 5 April 1942 | 14:38 | P-40 | |
| 3 | 5 March 1942 | 16:45 | P-40 | | — | 5 April 1942 | — | P-40 | |
| 4 | 8 March 1942 | 16:45 | Pe-2 | | 9 | 18 April 1942 | 05:07 | I-153 | |
| 5 | 13 March 1942 | 16:55 | I-16 | | — | 18 April 1942 | — | I-153 | |
| 6 | 15 March 1942 | 11:56 | I-16 | | 10 | 30 April 1942 | 14:52 | MiG-3 | |
– 3. Staffel of Jagdgeschwader 54 – Eastern Front — 1 May 1942 – 3 February 1943
| 11 | 29 May 1942 | 20:25 | Yak-1 | | 21 | 11 September 1942 | 07:30 | Pe-2 | PQ 0025 |
| 12 | 10 July 1942 | 07:05 | P-40 | | 22 | 6 November 1942? (Note: According to Mathews and Foreman claimed on 8 November 1943.) | 11:32 | Il-2 | PQ 00152; 10 km (6.2 mi) south of Leningrad |
| 13 | 20 July 1942 | 15:26 | Pe-2 | | — | 7 November 1942 | — | P-40 | |
| 14 | 30 July 1942 | 15:07 | I-153 | PQ 71794 vicinity of Bely Kolodez | 23 | 15 January 1943 | 09:36 | La-5 | PQ 10242; 25 km (16 mi) east-southeast of Shlisselburg |
| 15 | 19 August 1942 | 18:47 | Pe-2 | east of Zubtsov | 24 | 15 January 1943 | 12:47 | La-5 | PQ 10251; 30 km (19 mi) west-southwest of Shlisselburg |
| — | 19 August 1942 | — | Pe-2 | east of Zubtsov | 25 | 15 January 1943 | 12:52 | La-5 | PQ 10124 east of Shlisselburg |
| 16 | 21 August 1942 | 06:35 | I-16 | PQ 47562; 15 km (9.3 mi) north of Rzhev | 26 | 15 January 1943 | 13:03 | Il-2 | PQ 00244; 10 km (6.2 mi) southwest of Shlisselburg |
| 17 | 23 August 1942 | 06:25 | I-16 | PQ 47594 north of Rzhev | 27 | 16 January 1943 | 12:40 | Il-2 | PQ 00293; 10 km (6.2 mi) west of Mga |
| 18 | 25 August 1942 | 17:38 | I-16 | PQ 47542; 20 km (12 mi) northwest of Rzhev | 28 | 25 January 1943 | 10:17 | Il-2 | PQ 10144 south of Shlisselburg |
| 19 | 26 August 1942 | 06:10 | MiG-3 | PQ 47852; 10 km (6.2 mi) southeast of Zubtsov | — | 25 January 1943 | — | LaGG-3 | |
| — | 26 August 1942 | — | MiG-3 | | 29 | 26 January 1943 | 13:30 | P-40 | PQ 10141 south of Shlisselburg |
| 20 | 8 September 1942 | 10:07? (Note: According to Mathews and Foreman claimed at 10:37.) | Yak-4 | PQ 01821; 30 km (19 mi) northeast of Leningrad | 30 | 27 January 1943 | 10:26 | LaGG-3 | PQ 10143 south of Shlisselburg |
| — | 11 September 1942 | — | LaGG-3 | | — | 27 January 1943 | — | LaGG-3 | |
– 3. Staffel of Jagdgeschwader 54 – Eastern Front — February 1943
| 31 | 10 February 1943 | 08:46 | I-153 | PQ 36 Ost 00283; 20 km (12 mi) west of Mga | 32 | 19 February 1943 | 15:25 | Pe-2 | PQ 36 Ost 10473; 25 km (16 mi) northeast of Lyuban |
| — ? (Note: This unconfirmed claim is not listed by Mathews and Foreman.) | 10 February 1943 | — | I-16 | | 33 | 22 February 1943 | 13:40 | Il-2 | PQ 36 Ost 10322; 10 km (6.2 mi) southeast of Mga |
– 1. Staffel of Jagdgeschwader 54 – Eastern Front — March – 31 December 1943
| 34 | 7 March 1943 | 14:13 | Il-2 | PQ 35 Ost 18354; 40 km (25 mi) south of Staraya Russa | 49 | 7 July 1943 | 18:11 | LaGG-3 | PQ 35 Ost 63734; 25 km (16 mi) south-southwest of Maloarkhangelsk |
| 35 | 7 March 1943 | 14:16 | Il-2 | PQ 35 Ost 18232; 45 km (28 mi) north of Chełm | 50 | 8 July 1943 | 13:17 | LaGG-3 | PQ 35 Ost 63832; 40 km (25 mi) southeast of Maloarkhangelsk |
| — ? | 10 March 1943 | — | Il-2 | | 51 | 10 July 1943 | 10:53 | P-39 | PQ 35 Ost 63521; 15 km (9.3 mi) west-northwest of Maloarkhangelsk |
| 36 | 15 March 1943 | 07:55 | LaGG-3 | PQ 35 Ost 18244; 20 km (12 mi) southeast of Staraya Russa | 52 | 11 July 1943 | 18:37? (Note: According to Mathews and Foreman claimed at 18:54.) | P-39 | PQ 35 Ost 63554; 15 km (9.3 mi) west-southwest of Maloarkhangelsk |
| 37 | 15 March 1943 | 10:58 | La-5 | PQ 35 Ost 18253; 25 km (16 mi) southeast of Staraya Russa | 53? (Note: This claim is not listed by Prien, Stemmer, Rodeike and Bock. Mathews and Foreman list this claim as Rademacher's 53rd aerial victory.) | 13 July 1943 | 14:02 | Il-2 | 30 km (19 mi) northwest of Bolkhov |
| 38 | 22 March 1943 | 15:27 | Il-2 | PQ 36 Ost 00274 vicinity of Gatchina | 54 | 13 July 1943 | 14:09 | Il-2 | PQ 35 Ost 54442; 25 km (16 mi) west-northwest of Bolkhov |
| 39♠ | 5 July 1943 | 07:10 | LaGG-3 | PQ 35 Ost 63411; 40 km (25 mi) southwest of Maloarkhangelsk | 55 | 13 July 1943 | 14:14 | Il-2 | PQ 35 Ost 54443; 30 km (19 mi) northwest of Bolkhov |
| 40♠ | 5 July 1943 | 09:52 | La-5 | PQ 35 Ost 63742; 45 km (28 mi) southwest of Maloarkhangelsk | — ? | 14 July 1943 | — | Yak-9 | |
| 41♠ | 5 July 1943 | 09:58 | LaGG-3 | PQ 35 Ost 63862; 45 km (28 mi) north-northwest of Kursk | 56 | 16 July 1943 | 08:16 | LaGG-3 | PQ 35 Ost 54312; 20 km (12 mi) east-southeast of Zhizdra |
| 42♠ | 5 July 1943 | 15:43 | P-39 | PQ 35 Ost 63581; 20 km (12 mi) southwest of Maloarkhangelsk | 57 | 17 July 1943 | 10:42 | Il-2 m.H. (Note: The "m.H." refers to an Ilyushin Il-2 with rear gunner (mit Heckschütze).) | PQ 35 Ost 63394; 15 km (9.3 mi) northwest of Maloarkhangelsk |
| 43♠ | 5 July 1943 | 15:50 | La-5 | PQ 35 Ost 63582; 35 km (22 mi) southwest of Maloarkhangelsk | 58 | 20 July 1943 | 13:06 | Il-2 | PQ 35 Ost 54872; 25 km (16 mi) south of Mtsensk |
| 44♠ | 5 July 1943 | 18:42 | Il-2 | PQ 35 Ost 63693; 30 km (19 mi) east-southeast of Maloarkhangelsk | 59 | 14 October 1943 | 08:06 | LaGG-3 | PQ 35 Ost 15542 south of Lenin |
| 45♠ | 5 July 1943 | 18:53 | La-5 | PQ 35 Ost 63534; 15 km (9.3 mi) west-southwest of Maloarkhangelsk | — ? | 10 November 1943 | — | Il-2 | |
| 46 | 6 July 1943 | 14:07 | La-5 | PQ 35 Ost 63711; 40 km (25 mi) southwest of Maloarkhangelsk | 60 | 11 November 1943 | 10:34 | Il-2 | PQ 35 Ost 06734 |
| 47 | 6 July 1943 | 14:25 | La-5 | PQ 35 Ost 63583; 20 km (12 mi) southwest of Maloarkhangelsk | 61 | 29 November 1943 | 13:16 | Il-2 | PQ 25 Ost 96664; 20 km (12 mi) southwest of Gorodok |
| 48 | 7 July 1943 | 08:40 | Yak-7 | PQ 35 Ost 63574; 35 km (22 mi) southwest of Maloarkhangelsk | 62 | 8 December 1943 | 07:10 | Yak-9 | PQ 35 Ost 06562 |
| — ? | 7 July 1943 | — | Boston | | | | | | |
– 1. Staffel of Jagdgeschwader 54 – Eastern Front — 1 January – 31 December 1944
| 63 | 7 February 1944 | 07:45 | La-5 | PQ 35 Ost 06733 | — ? | 1 April 1944 | — | Il-2 | |
| 64 | 12 February 1944 | 11:07 | La-5 | PQ 35 Ost 05221 | — ? | 1 April 1944 | — | Il-2 | |
| 65 | 24 February 1944 | 14:50 | La-5 | PQ 26 Ost 70834; 20 km (12 mi) southwest of Narva | 71 | 2 April 1944 | 11:48 | Il-2 | PQ 26 Ost 70353; Baltic Sea, 35 km (22 mi) northeast of Kunda |
| 66 | 8 March 1944 | 16:33 | Il-2 | PQ 26 Ost 60614 southeast of Kunda | 72 | 3 April 1944 | 17:10 | Pe-2 | PQ 26 Ost 60439; 25 km (16 mi) east-southeast of Dünaburg |
| — ? | 17 March 1944 | — | Yak-9 | | 73 | 26 May 1944 | 18:47 | La-5 | PQ 26 Ost 80315; Gulf of Finland, north of Hungerburg |
| 67 | 21 March 1944 | 09:25 | Il-2 | PQ 26 Ost 70451; Baltic Sea, 25 km (16 mi) northwest of Hungerburg | 74 | 27 July 1944 | 15:54 | Yak-9 | PQ NH-3/8 southeast of Telšiai |
| 68 | 26 March 1944 | 14:28 | Pe-2 | PQ 26 Ost 70484; Baltic Sea, 20 km (12 mi) northwest of Hungerburg | 75 | 29 July 1944 | 19:06 | Yak-9 | PQ ML-8/4 |
| 69 | 26 March 1944 | 14:34 | Il-2 | PQ 26 Ost 70691; 15 km (9.3 mi) southwest of Narva | 76 | 29 July 1944 | 19:09 | Yak-9 | PQ NL-2/2 |
| 70 | 1 April 1944 | 15:16 | Il-2 | PQ 25 Ost 88369; 20 km (12 mi) southwest of Selo | 77 | 6 August 1944 | 17:50 | P-39 | PQ LK-7/2 southeast of Bausha |
– 11. Staffel of Jagdgeschwader 7 – Defense of the Reich — February – April 1945
| 78 | 1 February 1945 | — | Tempest | vicinity of Braunschweig | 86 | 27 February 1945 | — | B-24 | Halle-Leipzig |
| 79 | 3 February 1945 | — | B-17 | vicinity of Halle | 87 | 18 March 1945 | 11:14 | B-17 | Salzwedel |
| 80 | 3 February 1945 | — | B-24 | vicinity of Magdeburg | 88 | 19 March 1945 | — | P-51 | vicinity of Chemnitz |
| 81 | 9 February 1945 | — | B-17 | vicinity of Berlin | 89 | 24 March 1945 | — | B-17* | vicinity of Wittenberge |
| 82 | 9 February 1945 | — | B-17 | vicinity of Berlin | 90 | 25 March 1945 | 10:20 | B-24* | vicinity of Lauenburg |
| 83 | 14 February 1945 | — | B-17 | vicinity of Neumünster | 91 | 31 March 1945 | — | P-51 | |
| 84 | 16 February 1945 | — | P-51 | vicinity of Hannover | 92 | 4 April 1945 | — | B-24 | vicinity of Bremen |
| 85 | 24 February 1945 | — | B-24 | east of Lüneburg | 93 | 10 April 1945 | — | P-51 | |

=== Awards ===
- Iron Cross (1939) 2nd and 1st Class
- Honor Goblet of the Luftwaffe on 19 October 1942 as Oberfeldwebel and pilot
- German Cross in Gold on 25 March 1943 as Oberfeldwebel in the 3./Jagdgeschwader 54
- Knight's Cross of the Iron Cross on 30 September 1944 as Leutnant and pilot in the 1./Jagdgeschwader 54
