= Walter Nowotny =

German fighter ace and Knight's Cross recipient

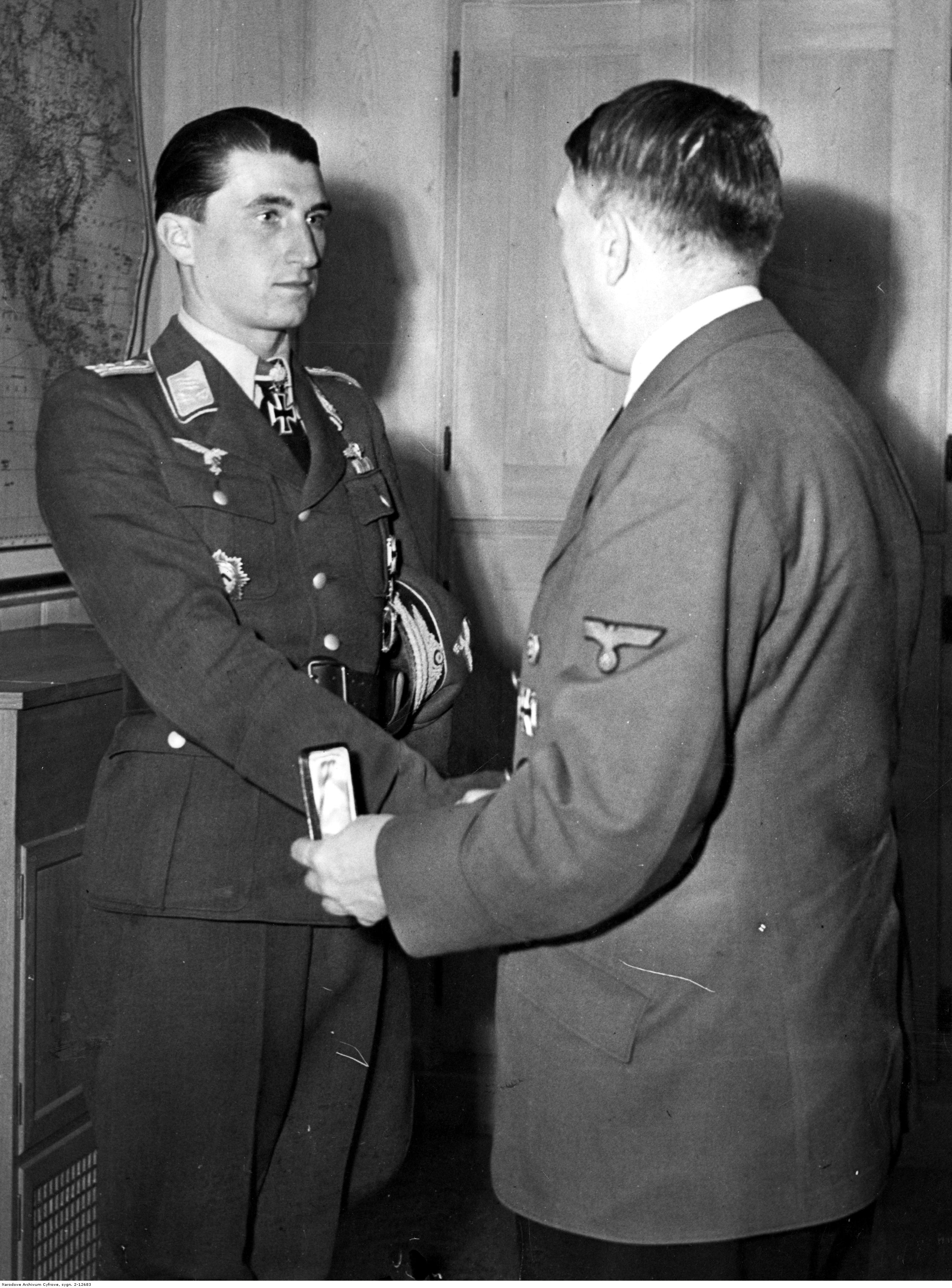
- Nowotny being decorated by Hitler, 1943
- Born: 7 December 1920; Gmünd, Austria
- Died: 8 November 1944 (aged 23); Epe, Nazi Germany
- Cause of death: Killed in action
- Burial place: Vienna Central Cemetery
- Military career
- Allegiance: Nazi Germany
- Branch: Luftwaffe
- Service years: 1939–1944
- Rank: Major (major)
- Nickname: Nowi
- Service number: NSDAP 6,382,781
- Units: JG 54, JG 101 and Kommando Nowotny
- Commands: I./JG 54, JG 101, Kommando Nowotny
- Conflicts: World War II; Eastern Front; Operation Barbarossa; Defense of the Reich †
- Awards: Knight's Cross of the Iron Cross with Oak Leaves, Swords and Diamonds

Walter Nowotny (7 December 1920 – 8 November 1944) was an Austrian-born fighter ace of the Luftwaffe in World War II. He is credited with 258 aerial victories—that is, 258 aerial combat encounters resulting in the destruction of the enemy aircraft—in 442 combat missions. Nowotny achieved 255 of these victories on the Eastern Front and three while flying one of the first jet fighters, the Messerschmitt Me 262, in the Defense of the Reich. He scored most of his victories in the Focke-Wulf Fw 190, and approximately 50 in the Messerschmitt Bf 109. Nowotny scored an "ace in a day" on multiple occasions, shooting down at least five airplanes on the same day, including two occurrences of "double-ace in a day" (scored at least ten kills) in mid-1943.

Nowotny joined the Luftwaffe in 1939 and completed his fighter pilot training in 1941, after which he was posted to Jagdgeschwader 54 "Grünherz" (JG 54) on the Eastern Front. Nowotny was the first pilot to achieve 250 victories – 194 in 1943 alone – earning him the Knight's Cross of the Iron Cross with Oak Leaves, Swords and Diamonds, one of just 27 recipients, on 19 October 1943. For propaganda reasons, he was ordered to cease operational flying.

Reinstated to front-line service in September 1944, Nowotny tested and developed tactics for the Messerschmitt Me 262 jet fighter. He was credited with three victories in this aircraft type before being killed in a crash following combat with United States Army Air Forces (USAAF) fighters on 8 November 1944. It is thought his engine might have failed. After his death, the first operational jet fighter wing, Jagdgeschwader 7 "Nowotny", was named in his honour.

== Early life ==
Walter Nowotny was born in Gmünd, a small town in Lower Austria. His father, Rudolf Nowotny, was a railway official; his two brothers, Rudolf and Hubert, became officers in the Wehrmacht. Hubert Nowotny was killed in action in the Battle of Stalingrad. From 1925 to 1935, his family lived in Schwarzenau until his father was relocated to Mistelbach, north of Vienna. Walter attended the primary school (Volksschule) in Schwarzenau before graduating to the Bundesoberrealschule in Waidhofen an der Thaya. During these years, he also sang in the Cistercian monastery boy's choir in the Zwettl Abbey.

Due to his father's relocation, Nowotny transferred to the secondary school (Oberschule) in Laa an der Thaya. In his teens, Nowotny was interested in all kinds of sports. In 1935, he played football for the school team in Waidhofen, and in 1937, took first place in the javelin throw and third place in the Lower Austrian 1,000 metres (0.62 mi) track and field championships. Nowotny also visited the 1936 Summer Olympics in Berlin. Nowotny had joined the Nazi Party (NSDAP—National Socialist German Workers' Party) in 1938 with a membership number 6,382,781.

In the same year, he joined the Hitler Youth where he became a leader of a troop in the Mistelbach Hitler Youth district. On 26 January 1939, still Oberschüler, Nowotny submitted an application "for voluntary entry into active military service" with the aim of becoming a pilot. He achieved his diploma (Matura) on 22 May 1939 and then served four months with the Reichsarbeitsdienst (mandatory Labour Service). He joined the Luftwaffe on 1 October 1939 after have received his official enlistment order.

== Luftwaffe career ==
Nowotny's military basic training began at the 2. Flieger-Ausbildungsregiment 62 in Quedlinburg (1 October 1939 – 15 November 1939) and continued at the Luftkriegschule 5 in Breslau-Schöngarten (16 November 1939 – 30 June 1940). (Note: The airport at Breslau-Schöngarten is the Wrocław Airport today.) He was promoted to Fahnenjunker-Gefreiter on 1 March 1940 and shortly afterwards, on 1 April 1940, to Fahnenjunker-Unteroffizier. On 1 July 1940, Notwotny was promoted again, to the rank of Fähnrich. He completed his pilot training and received the Pilot Badge on 19 August 1940. Nowotny also trained as a fighter pilot at the Jagdfliegerschule 5 in Wien-Schwechat (1 August 1940 – 15 November 1940), the same school that Hans-Joachim Marseille had attended one year earlier. One of his teachers at the Jagdfliegerschule 5 was the Austro-Hungarian World War I ace Julius Arigi. Here Nowotny befriended Karl Schnörrer and Paul Galland, the younger brother of General der Jagdflieger Adolf Galland. After graduation from the Jagdfliegerschule 5, Nowotny was transferred to the I./Ergänzungs-Jagdgruppe Merseburg on 16 November 1940, flying fighter cover for the Leuna industrial works.

=== With Jagdgeschwader 54 ===
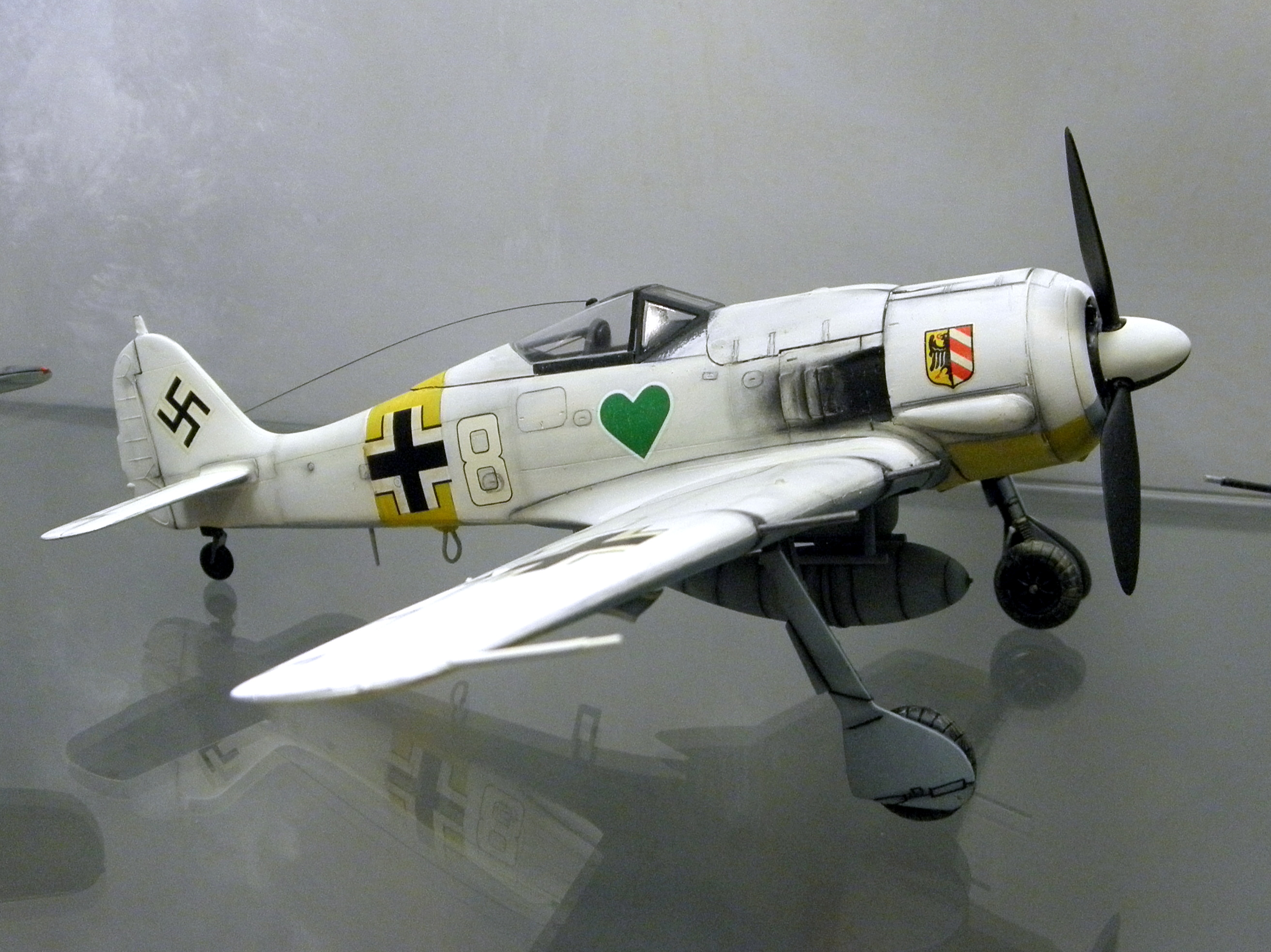
Scale model of Focke-Wulf Fw 190A-4 JG 54.

Nowotny was posted to the Ergänzungsstaffel (Training/Supplement Squadron) of Jagdgeschwader 54 (JG 54) on 1 December 1940. (Note: For an explanation of Luftwaffe unit designations, see Organization of the Luftwaffe during World War II.) JG 54 at the time was under the command of Major Hannes Trautloft. Nowotny was transferred again, this time to the 9. Staffel (9th squadron) of JG 54 (9./JG 54), the so-called Teufelsstaffel (Devils' Squadron) where he was further trained by veterans from the front line (23 February 1941 – 25 March 1941). From 25 March 1941 to 10 March 1942, Notwotny flew with the Stabsstaffel of the Ergänzungs-Jagdgruppe JG 54 where he was promoted to Leutnant on 1 April 1941, effective as of 1 February 1941.

Nowotny flew a Messerschmitt Bf 109 E-7 (Werknummer 1173—factory number) "White 2" on his 24th operational mission on 19 July 1941 and claimed his first two enemy aircraft, both Polikarpov I-153 biplanes of Voenno-Vozdushnye Sily (VVS—Military Air Forces) KBF's 12 OIAE/61 BAB, over Saaremaa. He was shot down in the same engagement by Aleksandr Avdeyev, also in a I-153 fighter. According to Soviet archives, no Soviet aircraft was lost in the engagement. Nowotny spent three days in a dinghy in the Gulf of Riga – on one occasion almost being run down by a Soviet destroyer – until finally being washed ashore on the Latvian coast.

Nowotny quickly recovered from his ordeal and on 31 July claimed a Beriev MBR-2 flying boat north-west of Saaremaa and an Ilyushin DB-3 bomber south of the island. For the rest of his combat career, Nowotny always wore the trousers (German: Abschußhose roughly "shot down pants" sometimes also referred to as "victory pants") that he had worn during those three days in the Gulf of Riga – with one exception, his last sortie, at Achmer on 8 November 1944, when he was killed flying the Messerschmitt Me 262 jet fighter.

In 1942, Nowotny increased his tally of victories and claimed his 30th and 31st kills on 11 July over the Volkhov bridgehead during the Battle of Lyuban, which earned him the Honor Goblet of the Luftwaffe (Ehrenpokal der Luftwaffe) on 14 July 1942. Nowotny shot down a further five aircraft on a single day (32nd – 36th victories), known as an "ace in a day", on 20 July and repeated the designation with seven (48th – 54th victories) on 2 August. After having downed three enemy aircraft on 11 August, Leutnant Nowotny carried out three victory passes over the airfield, despite having sustained combat damage to his own Bf 109 "Black 1". In the subsequent landing, his aircraft somersaulted and he sustained moderate injuries. Walter Nowotny was awarded the Knight's Cross of the Iron Cross (Ritterkreuz des Eisernen Kreuzes) on 4 September, after 56 aerial victories. The Knight's Cross earned him a home leave to Vienna. Here, the brothers Hubert and Walter met for the last time before Hubert was killed at Stalingrad. Leutnant Nowotny was made Staffelkapitän (squadron leader) of 1. Staffel of JG 54 on 25 October, replacing Oberleutnant Heinz Lange who was transferred.

In January 1943, JG 54 started converting to the agile Focke-Wulf Fw 190 fighter. With the new aircraft, Nowotny scored at an unprecedented "kill" rate, often averaging more than two planes a day for weeks on end. As of 1 February 1943, Nowotny, Schnörrer, – Nowotny's wingman since late 1942 – Anton Döbele and Rudolf Rademacher, formed a team known as the "chain of devils" (Teufelskette) or the Nowotny Schwarm, which during the course of the war was credited with 524 combined kills, making them the most successful team in the Luftwaffe.

Nowotny scored his 69th to 72nd victory on 16 March. He reached the century mark on 15 June 1943, on his 344th combat mission. He was the 42nd Luftwaffe pilot to achieve the century mark. By 24 June, he would accumulate a further 24 victories increasing his total to 124. On 2 August, Hauptmann Gerhard Homuth, the commander of I. Gruppe was wounded in combat. In consequence, command temporarily was passed to Oberleutnant Hans Götz who was killed in action only two days later. Command of the Gruppe was then given to Oberleutnant Otto Vinzent. On 11 August, Vinzent was given command of 2. Staffel and Nowotny temporarily assumed command of I. Gruppe. On 15 September, Nowotny was officially appointed Gruppenkommandeur (group commander) of I. Gruppe.

In August alone, he shot down 49 aircraft – a number matched exactly by Jagdgeschwader 52's (JG 52) Erich Hartmann – bringing Nowotny's total to 161 victories. On 1 September, he scored ten victories in two sorties, which took his tally to 183. Seventy-two hours later, that number had risen to 189, earning him the Knight's Cross of the Iron Cross with Oak Leaves (Ritterkreuz des Eisernen Kreuzes mit Eichenlaub) on 8 September. The award was to be personally presented by the Führer, Adolf Hitler, on 22 September 1943. However, by this date Nowotny had claimed his double century (200) on 8 September, and, on 15 September, his 215th victory, making him the highest-scoring pilot in the Luftwaffe to that time. Two Lavochkin La-5s and a Yakovlev Yak-9 on 17 September brought his score to 218 victories, earning him Knight's Cross of the Iron Cross with Oak Leaves and Swords (Ritterkreuz des Eisernen Kreuzes mit Eichenlaub und Schwertern) on 22 September 1943. The planned "Oak Leaves" presentation thus became a "Swords" ceremony. The presentation was made by Hitler at the Wolf's Lair, Hitler's headquarters in Rastenburg on 22 September 1943. Three other Luftwaffe officers were presented with awards that day by Hitler, Major Hartmann Grasser and Hauptmann Heinrich Prinz zu Sayn-Wittgenstein were awarded the Oak Leaves, and Hauptmann Günther Rall also received the Swords to his Knight's Cross with Oak Leaves.

=== Diamonds ===
Nowotny was promoted to Hauptmann on 21 September 1943, effective as of 1 October, following his 225th victory. On 9 October in aerial combat south of Nevel, he was credited with JG 54s 6,000th aerial victory. Five days later, Nowotny became the first pilot to reach 250 victories, following his 442 combat missions. Nowotny was celebrating this feat in the Ria Bar in Vilna when he received a phone call from Hitler himself, announcing that he had been awarded the Knight's Cross of the Iron Cross with Oak Leaves, Swords and Diamonds (Ritterkreuz des Eisernen Kreuzes mit Eichenlaub, Schwertern und Brillanten), making him the eighth of 27 men to be so honored.

The Brillanten (Diamonds) were presented by Hitler at the Wolfsschanze, near Kętrzyn (German: Rastenburg) on 19 October 1943. Nowotny immediately went on a short vacation to Vienna before returning to his front-line unit. On 29 October 1943, Nowotny presented the Knight's Cross of the Iron Cross to Oberfeldwebel Otto Kittel. In the days following, Nowotny flew as wingman to Karl Schnörrer, helping him accumulate further victories. On 11 November, Anton Döbele was killed in a mid-air collision with an Il-2 Sturmovik. The next day, 12 November 1943, Schnörrer was severely injured after bailing out at low altitude. Schnörrer was replaced as Nowotny's wingman by Unteroffizier Ernst Richter. With Richter, Nowotny claimed his final two aerial victories on the Eastern Front on 15 November 1943. In total, Nowotny had claimed 255 confirmed kills plus a further 50 unconfirmed, before he was taken off combat duty.

Nowotny was sent on a propaganda tour in Germany, which included the presentation of the Knight's Cross of the War Merit Cross (Ritterkreuz des Kriegsverdienstkreuzes) to the railroad engineer August Kindervater on 7 December 1943 – Nowotny's 23rd birthday. Shortly before Christmas, he visited the Focke-Wulf production site at Bad Eilsen, where he was met by Professor Kurt Tank. The mayor of Vienna, Dipl.-Ing. (Note: Dipl.-Ing. (German: Diplom Ingenieur - Engineer) is a German name prefix acquired with a university degree in the field of engineering.) Hanns Blaschke awarded Nowotny the city's ring of honour on 11 January 1944, the presentation taking place a week later. It was a token that Nowotny accepted reluctantly, feeling that he did not deserve it. His next official visit was the Büromaschinenfabrik (office machinery factory) at Zella-Mehlis, before he briefly returned to Jagdgeschwader 54. Nowotny was made Geschwaderkommodore of Jagdgeschwader 101 (JG 101) and commander of the Jagdfliegerschule 1, a Luftwaffe fighter pilot training school at Pau in southern France, in April 1944. During his absence from JG 54, Nowotny was temporarily replaced by Hauptmann Heinz Lange as commander of I. Gruppe. On 4 February, Hauptmann Horst Ademeit officially succeeded Nowotny as Gruppenkommandeur.

=== Kommando Nowotny and death ===
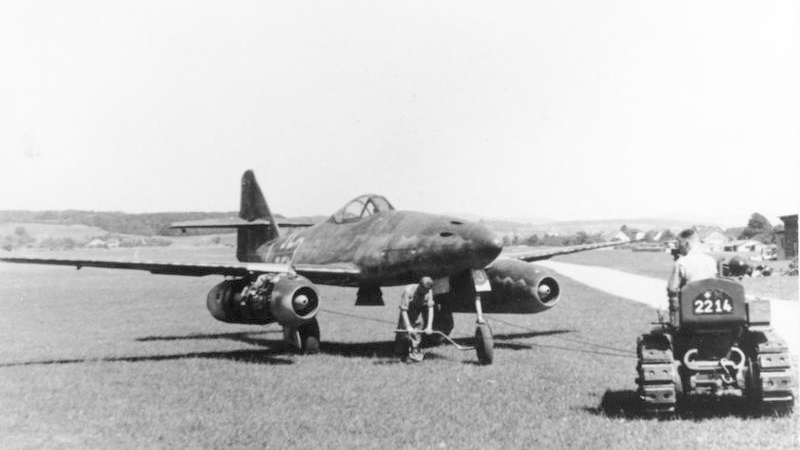
Me 262 A, 25 April 1945

In September 1944, Nowotny was made commander of a specialist unit dubbed Kommando Nowotny, flying the newly developed Messerschmitt Me 262 out of airfields near Osnabrück. The unit not only had to contend with the enemy, but also with working through the 'teething' phase of the Me 262 and developing the tactics appropriate for a jet unit. On 7 October, Nowotny downed a B-24 Liberator bomber, his first aerial victory on the Western Front.

Generals Alfred Keller and Adolf Galland had scheduled an inspection at Achmer Airfield for the afternoon of 7 November 1944. Galland had already visited Kommando Nowotny several times and was deeply concerned over the high attrition rate and meager success achieved by the Me 262. After inspecting the two airfields at Achmer and Hesepe, he stayed in the Penterknapp barracks discussing the problems of the past few weeks. Several pilots openly expressed their doubts as to the readiness of the Me 262 for combat operations.

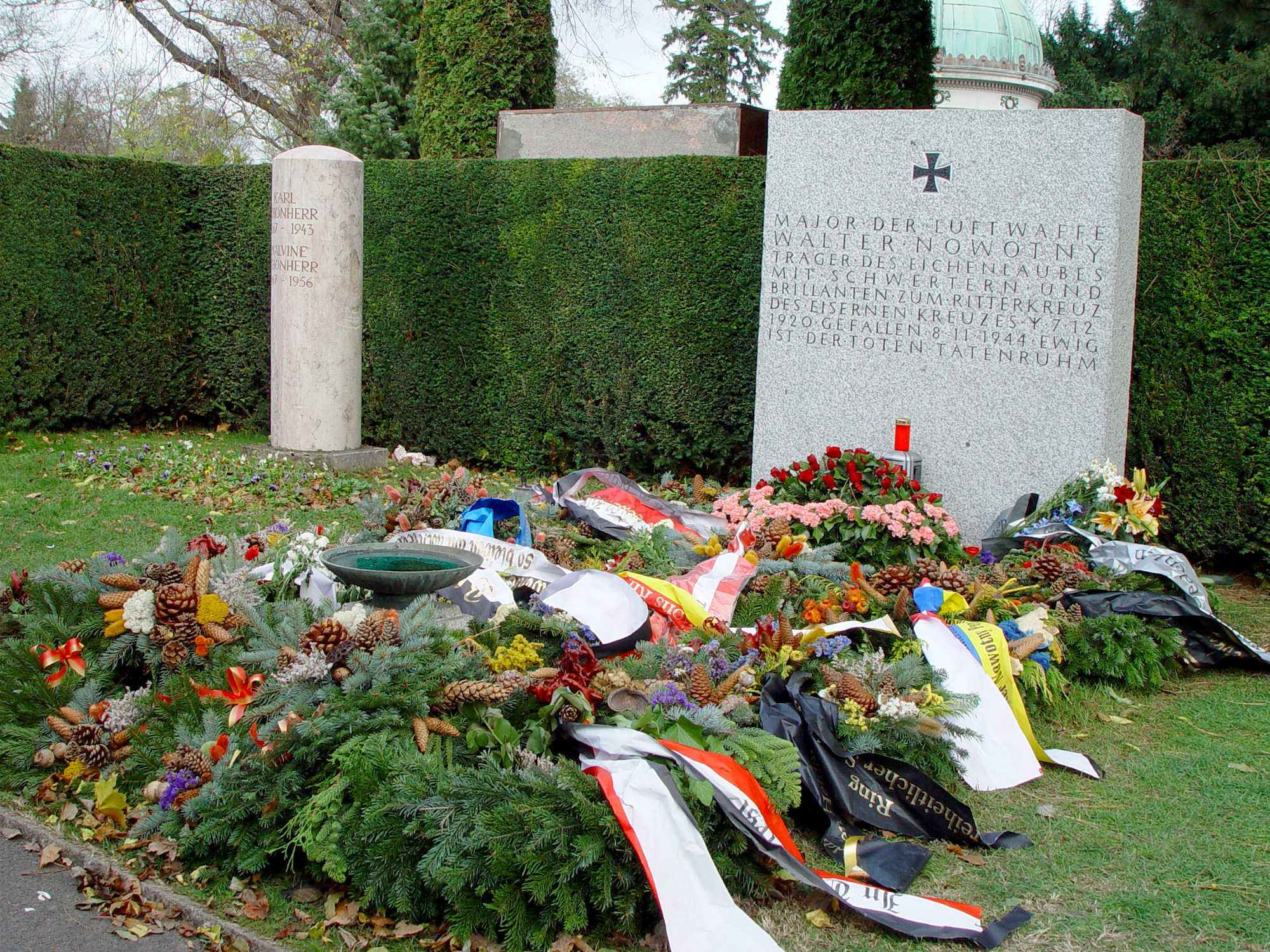
Walter Nowotny's grave at the Vienna Central Cemetery

The next morning, 8 November 1944, the Generals arrived again at Nowotny's command post and Keller declared that the aces of the past years had become cowards and that the Luftwaffe had lost its fighting spirit. Shortly after, news reached the command post of a large bomber formation approaching. Two Rotten of Me 262 were prepared for take-off, Erich Büttner and Franz Schall at Hesepe, and Nowotny and Günther Wegmann at Achmer. At first only Schall and Wegmann managed to take off because Büttner had a punctured tire during taxiing and Nowotny's turbines initially refused to start. With some delay, Nowotny took off and engaged the enemy on his own, Schall and Wegmann having since retired from the action after sustaining battle damage. Nowotny radioed that he had downed a B-24 Liberator and a P-51 Mustang before he reported one engine failing and made one final garbled transmission containing the word "burning". Helmut Lennartz recalled:

"I remember Nowotny's crash very well. Feldwebel Gossler, a radio operator with our unit, had set up a radio on the airfield. Over this set I and many others listened to the radio communications with Nowotny's aircraft. His last words were, "I'm on fire" or "it's on fire". The words were slightly garbled.

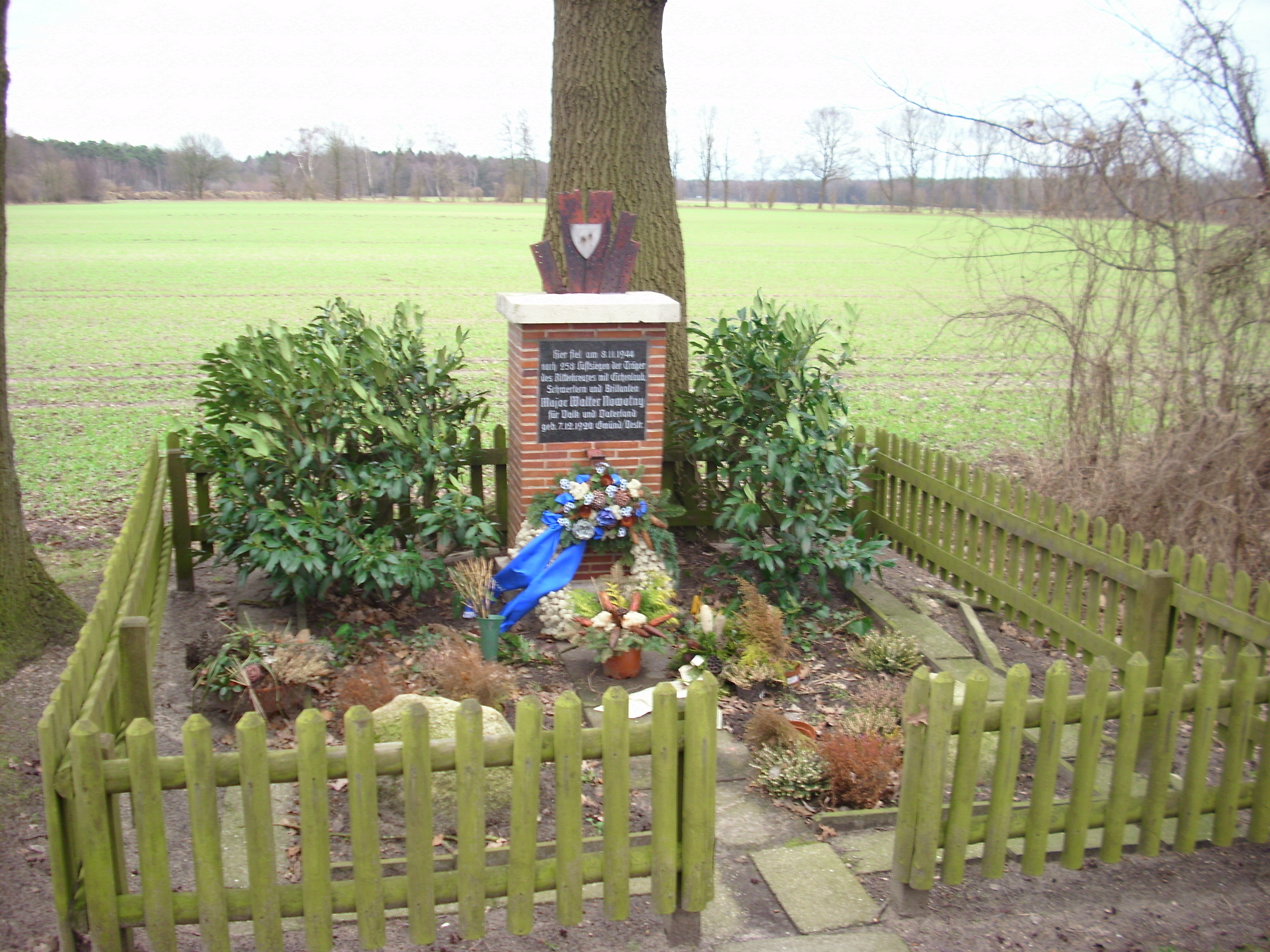
Memorial until August 2017.

Current memorial

It remains unclear whether Nowotny was killed due to engine failure or whether he was shot down by United States Army Air Forces (USAAF) Captain Ernest C. Fiebelkorn (20th Fighter Group) and 1st Lieutenant Edward "Buddy" Haydon (357th Fighter Group) east of Hesepe. In recent years, United States military historians proposed that Nowotny's victor may have been P-51D pilot Lieutenant Richard W. Stevens of the 364th Fighter Group. Many witnesses observed Nowotny's Me 262 A-1a (Werknummer 110 400) "White 8" dive vertically out of the clouds and crash at Epe, 2.5 kilometres (1.6 mi) east of Hesepe. The only remains of Nowotny that could be located were one severed hand and a piece of his Knights Cross with diamonds.

Nowotny was given a state funeral in Vienna. The guard of honour was composed of his friend Karl Schnörrer, Oberst Gordon Gollob, Major Rudolf Schoenert, Hauptmann Heinz Strüning, Major Josef Fözö and Major Georg Christl. The eulogy was delivered by Generaloberst Otto Deßloch. Nowotny was buried at the Vienna Central Cemetery in a grave of honour sponsored by the city of Vienna. Following an initiative by the Austrian Green Party and debates in the Vienna Landtag, a resolution supported by Social Democrats and Greens was passed to remove the status of honour in 2003. Nowotny's grave remains a frequent target of both far-left vandalism and far-right memorial festivities.

Following Nowotny's death, a stone memorial was built at the crash site in Epe which included remnants of his Me 262. The commemorating plaque on the memorial read: "Here on 8 November 1944, following 258 aerial victories, the recipient of the Knight's Cross with Oak Leaves, Swords and Diamonds, Major Walter Nowotny, fell for the people and the fatherland." In August 2017, following a lengthy debate in Bramsche, the plaque was replaced with a new text, addressing the issue of commemorating alleged war heroes, and commemorating the victims of war and resistance.

== Summary of career ==
=== Aerial victory claims ===
According to US historian David T. Zabecki, Nowotny was credited with 258 aerial victories. Spick also lists Nowotny with 258 aerial victories claimed in 442 combat missions. Nowotny achieved 255 of these victories on the Eastern Front and three while flying one of the first jet fighters, the Me 262, in the Defense of the Reich. Mathews and Foreman, authors of Luftwaffe Aces — Biographies and Victory Claims, researched the German Federal Archives and found records for 256 aerial victory claims, plus four further unconfirmed claims. This figure of confirmed claims includes 255 aerial victories on the Eastern Front and one victory on the Western Front flying the Me 262 jet fighter.

=== Awards ===
- Order of the Cross of Liberty 1st Class
- Ehrenabzeichen der finnischen Luftwaffe
- Combined Pilots-Observation Badge in Gold with Diamonds
- Eastern Front Medal
- Front Flying Clasp of the Luftwaffe for Fighter Pilots
  - in Gold (17 May 1942)
  - with pennant "400"
- Honor Goblet of the Luftwaffe on 20 July 1942 as Leutnant and pilot (Note: According to Held on 14 July 1942.)
- Wound Badge (1939) in Black
- Golden Hitler Youth Badge
- Viennas city ring of honor (11 January 1944)
- Iron Cross (1939)
  - 2nd Class (23 July 1941)
  - 1st Class (19 August 1941)
- German Cross in Gold on 21 August 1942 as Leutnant in the I./Jagdgeschwader 54
- Knight's Cross of the Iron Cross with Oak Leaves, Swords and Diamonds
  - Knight's Cross on 4 September 1942 as Leutnant and pilot in the 9./Jagdgeschwader 54 (Note: According to Scherzer as pilot in the 3./Jagdgeschwader 54.)
  - 293rd Oak Leaves on 4 September 1943 as Oberleutnant and Staffelkapitän of the 1./Jagdgeschwader 54
  - 37th Swords on 22 September 1943 as Hauptmann and Gruppenkommandeur of the I./Jagdgeschwader 54
  - 8th Diamonds (19 October 1943) as Hauptmann and Gruppenkommandeur of the I./Jagdgeschwader 54

=== Promotions ===
1 October 1939:	Fahnenjunker (Officer Candidate)
1 March 1940:	Fahnenjunker-Gefreiter (Officer Candidate with Lance Corporal rank)
1 April 1940:	Fahnenjunker-Unteroffizier (Officer Candidate with Corporal/NCO/Junior Sergeant rank)
1 July 1940:	Fähnrich
1 April 1941:	Leutnant (Second Lieutenant) with Rank Seniority (RDA) from 1 February 1941
1 February 1943:	Oberleutnant (First Lieutenant)
21 September 1943:	Hauptmann (Captain) with effect and RDA from 1 October 1943
1 September 1944:	Major (Major)

== Notes ==
Military offices
Preceded by Oberstleutnant Erich von Selle	Commander of Jagdgeschwader 101; 1 April 1944 – 10 September 1944	Succeeded by Major Hans Knauth
Preceded by none	Commander of Kommando Nowotny; 26 September 1944 – 8 November 1944	Succeeded by Major Erich Hohagen
