= Hans Hahn =

Hans Hahn may refer to:

- Hans Hahn (mathematician) (1879–1934), Austrian mathematician
- Hans "Assi" Hahn (1914–1982), German World War II Luftwaffe flying ace
- Hans von Hahn (1914–1957), German Luftwaffe ace
