= Jagdgeschwader 101 =

- Active: 15 December 1942 – 16 April 1945
- Country: Nazi Germany
- Branch: Luftwaffe
- Type: Fighter Aircraft
- Role: Fighter pilot training wing
- Size: Air Force Wing

Commanders
- Notable commanders: Walter Nowotny (1 April 1944 – 10 September 1944)

Jagdgeschwader 101 (JG 101) was a Luftwaffe fighter-training-wing of World War II.

Formed at Werneuchen from Jagdfliegerschule 1, JG 101 was created in December 1942 and were stationed from 27 January 1943 at Pau, southern France. An operational training unit, the Geschwader was never officially deployed in combat, although on 5 March 1944 Jagdgruppe West and JG 101 defended Bergerac, Cognac, and other airfields in south west France against a raid by 8th Air Force B-24s.

The unit operated several training types, including the Gotha 143 and Bucker 131 biplanes and the French-built fighter Dewoitine D.520. JG 101 also operated the first two-seater Bf 109. The G-12 was a modified G-2, with a second seat behind the existing cockpit for the instructor. The two seat Fw 190F-8/U-1 trainer was also employed.

The Geschwader was disbanded on 16 April 1945 and 2,400 personnel were transferred to the 10. Fallschirm-Jäger-Division and 11. Fallschirm-Jäger-Division.

(This unit should not be confused with the hungarian 101. Puma Fighter Wing (101. Puma vadászrepülő ezred, ungarische JG 101 Puma). Formed on 1. May 1944, fought over Hungary and Austria until end of the war.

== Commanding officers ==
Geschwaderkommodore

- Oberstleutnant Erich von Selle (15 December 1942 – 31 March 1944)
- Hauptmann Walter Nowotny (1 April 1944 – 10 September 1944)
- Major Hans Knauth (11 September 1944 – 16 April 1945)

Gruppenkommandeure

- Major Otto Bertram (6 January 1943 – 30 April 1944)
- Hauptmann Gerhard Koall (1 May 1944 – 15 January 1945)
- Hauptmann Waldemar Wübke, 15 October 1944 – 15 April 1945
