= Otto Bertram =

German Luftwaffe pilot during World War II (1916–1987)

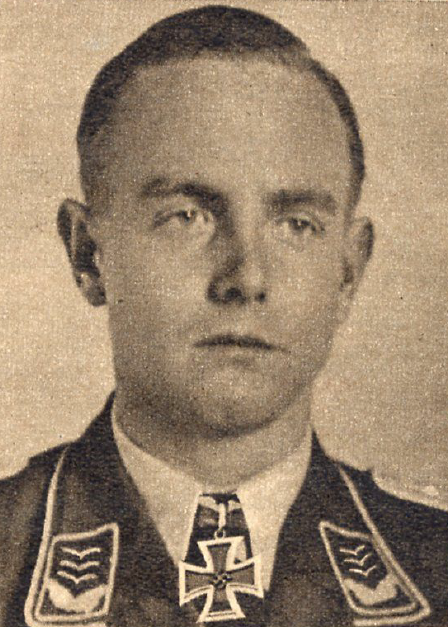
- Bertram as a Hauptmann
- Born: 30 April 1916; Wilhelmshaven
- Died: 8 February 1987 (aged 70); Freiburg im Breisgau
- Military career
- Allegiance: Nazi Germany (to 1945); West Germany
- Branch: Luftwaffe
- Service years: 1935–1945 (Wehrmacht); 1956–? Bundeswehr
- Rank: Major (Wehrmacht); Oberstleutnant (Bundeswehr)
- Nickname: Otsch
- Units: Condor Legion; JG 2, JG 101
- Commands: III./JG 2, I./JG 101, I./JG 6
- Conflicts: Spanish Civil War World War II
- Awards: Spanish Cross; Knight's Cross of the Iron Cross
- Other work: Bundeswehr

Otto Bertram (30 April 1916 in Wilhelmshaven – 8 February 1987 in Freiburg im Breisgau) was a German Spanish Civil War and World War II fighter ace who served in the Luftwaffe from 1935 until the end of World War II. He later joined the Bundeswehr and served as a military attaché. He shot down a total of 22 enemy aircraft, nine of which were claimed during the Spanish Civil War.

== Early life ==
Otto Bertram was born 30 April 1916, in Wilhelmshaven in the German Empire. He joined the cavalry of the German Army in April 1934.

== Spanish Civil War ==
Bertram transferred to the Luftwaffe in November 1935 and then joined the Condor Legion in March 1938, supporting Franco's Nationalists in the Spanish Civil War. In late July, Bertram was transferred from 3. Staffel (3rd squadron) of Jagdgruppe 88 to 1. Staffel. There, he was assigned the Messerschmitt Bf 109 2-67. He was credited with his first aerial victory on 12 August when he claimed a Polikarpov I-16 fighter shot down.

During the course of the war, Bertram, a leutnant, claimed nine victories flying with 1./Jagdgruppe 88, becoming one of the most successful fighter pilots in that conflict. On 4 October 1938, he was shot down by a Republican Polikarpov I-15 fighter. After bailing out he was taken prisoner of war. He was released following a prisoner exchange on 8 February 1939. For his accomplishments in Spain he was awarded the Spanish Cross in Gold with Swords and Diamonds (Spanienkreuz in Gold mit Schwertern und Brillanten).

== World War II ==
On 26 October 1939, Bertram was appointed Staffelkapitän (squadron leader) of 1. Staffel of Jagdgeschwader 2 "Richthofen", replacing Hauptmann Ernst-Günther Burggaller who was transferred. Now an oberleutnant, Bertram claimed his first aerial victory of World War II on 20 April 1940, when he downed a Morane 406 fighter over Saint-Avold, flown by future French ace Sgt. Chef Antoine Casenobe. However, the claim was not confirmed. In total, he claimed four victories during the Battle of France, although he was forced to crash land after gaining two victories on 19 May 1940. He returned to his unit unhurt.

Bertram led 1./JG 2 during the opening phases of the Battle of Britain. He claimed seven Royal Air Force (RAF) fighters downed in five days between 2 September 1940 and 6 September with the unit. On 26 September 1940, Bertram was appointed Gruppenkommandeur (group commander) of III. Gruppe JG 2, succeeding Major Dr. Erich Mix. In consequence, command of 1. Staffel was passed on to Oberleutnant Anton Mader. He claimed two further victories with the unit, two RAF Bristol Blenheim twin-engine bombers shot down near Le Havre on 9 October, to record his 21st and 22nd victories.

On 28 October 1940, Bertram was awarded the Knight's Cross of the Iron Cross (Ritterkreuz des Eisernen Kreuzes) for 13 victories in World War II and was banned from further combat flying and ordered to return to Germany. Both of his brothers who were also serving in the Luftwaffe had recently been killed in action. Hans a member of I. Gruppe of JG 27, was shot down over England near Haywards Heath on 30 September 1940, and Karl, a nightfighter pilot with 9./NJG 1, was killed when he crashed his Bf 110 west of Kiel following an engagement with a RAF bomber on 28 October. Bertram, as the sole surviving brother, was hence excused from further combat duty. As a result, command of III. Gruppe was given Hauptmann Hans Hahn while Bertram was transferred to Jagdfliegerschule 5, the fighter pilot school at Wien-Schwechat for the rest of 1940 and into 1941.

He spent the remainder of the war in administrative posts or training units. He was Gruppenkommandeur of I./JG 101 from 6 January 1943 to 30 April 1944. From February 1945, promoted to major, Bertram was Gruppenkommandeur of I./JG 6, a position he held until the end of the war.

== Later life ==
Bertram joined the Bundeswehr after the re militarisation of the Federal Republic of Germany in 1956. He held various positions in the Bundeswehr including that of press officer. Promoted to Oberstleutnant he served as a military attaché in Belgium and Luxembourg.

Bertram died in Freiburg im Breisgau, at the age of 70.

== Summary of career ==
=== Aerial victory claims ===
According to Obermaier, Bertram was credited with 22 aerial victories, nine of which during the Spanish Civil War and 13 over the Western Allies during the early phase of World War II, claimed in approximately 100 combat missions. Mathews and Foreman, authors of Luftwaffe Aces — Biographies and Victory Claims, researched the German Federal Archives and found records for 24 aerial victory claims, plus one further unconfirmed claim. This number includes 9 claims during the Spanish Civil War and 15 on the Western Front of World War II.

Chronicle of aerial victories
This and the – (dash) indicates unwitnessed aerial victory claims for which Bertram did not receive credit. This and the ? (question mark) indicates information discrepancies listed by Prien, Stemmer, Rodeike, Bock, Forsyth, Mathews and Foreman.
Claim	Date	Time	Type	Location	Claim	Date	Time	Type	Location
Spanish Civil War
– 1. Staffel of Jagdgruppe 88 – Spanish Civil War — August – October 1938
1	12 August 1938	—	I-16		6? (Note: According to Forsyth this claim is unconfirmed.)	7 September 1938	—	I-16	
2	14 August 1938	—	I-16		7?	23 September 1938	—	I-16	
3	15 August 1938	—	I-16		8	27 September 1938	—	I-16	
4	23 August 1938	—	I-16		9	4 October 1938	—	I-15	
5?	7 September 1938	—	I-16						
World War II
– 1. Staffel of Jagdgeschwader 2 "Richthofen" – "Phoney War" — 1 September 1939 – 9 May 1940
—	20 April 1940	—	P-36? (Note: According to Mathews and Foreman claimed as a Morane-Saulnier M.S.406.)	Saint-Avold					
– 1. Staffel of Jagdgeschwader 2 "Richthofen" – Battle of France — 10 May – 25 June 1940
1	14 May 1940	20:05	M.S.406	Sedan vicinity of Bouillon	4	3 June 1940	14:45	MB.150	south of Reims
2	19 May 1940	12:50	Hurricane	Cambrai	? (Note: This claim is not listed by Prien, Stemmer, Rodeike and Bock.)	3 June 1940	14:45	MB.151	south of Reims
3	19 May 1940	12:55	Hurricane	Cambrai	?	3 June 1940	14:50	MB.151	south of Reims
– 1. Staffel of Jagdgeschwader 2 "Richthofen" – Battle of Britain — 26 June – 24 September 1940
5	2 September 1940	14:25	Spitfire	New Romney	9	5 September 1940	16:10	Spitfire	south of Canterbury
6	2 September 1940	18:25	Spitfire	Eastchurch	10	5 September 1940	16:10	Spitfire	south of Canterbury
7	4 September 1940	10:10	Spitfire	Folkestone vicinity of London	11	6 September 1940	10:20	Hurricane	southwest of Dover
8	4 September 1940	14:05	Spitfire	London					
– Stab III. Gruppe of Jagdgeschwader 2 "Richthofen" – Battle of Britain — 24 September – 28 October 1940
12	9 October 1940	18:35	Blenheim	20 kilometres (12 mi) north of Le Havre	13	9 October 1940	18:35	Blenheim	20 kilometres (12 mi) north of Le Havre

=== Awards ===
- Spanish Cross in Gold with Swords and Diamonds (20 June 1939)
- Iron Cross (1939) 2nd and 1st Class
- Knight's Cross of the Iron Cross on 28 October 1940 as Hauptmann and Gruppenkommandeur of the III./Jagdgeschwader 2 "Richthofen"
