= Gerhard Koall =

German fighter ace (1912–1945)

- Born: 7 June 1912; Königsberg, East Prussia
- Died: 27 April 1945 (aged 32); Anklam
- Cause of death: Killed in action
- Military career
- Allegiance: Nazi Germany
- Branch: Luftwaffe
- Service years: 1935–1945
- Rank: Hauptmann (captain)
- Nickname: "Knall"
- Units: JG 54, EJG 1, JG 101, JG 3
- Commands: 3./JG 54, IV./JG 54, I./JG 101, II./EJG 1, IV./JG 3
- Conflicts: World War II: Invasion of Yugoslavia; Operation Barbarossa; Siege of Leningrad
- Awards: Knight's Cross of the Iron Cross

Gerhard "Knall" Koall (7 June 1912 – 27 April 1945) was a Luftwaffe ace and recipient of the Knight's Cross of the Iron Cross during World War II. The Knight's Cross of the Iron Cross, and its variants were the highest awards in the military and paramilitary forces of Nazi Germany during World War II. Gerhard Koall was killed on 27 April 1945 after being hit by Soviet anti-aircraft fire near Anklam. During his career he was credited with 37 victories, 35 on the Eastern Front and 2 during the Invasion of Yugoslavia.

== Early life and career ==
Koall was born on 7 June 1912 in Königsberg in the Kingdom of Prussia of the German Empire. Today it is Kaliningrad in Kaliningrad Oblast, the Russian exclave between Poland and Lithuania on the Baltic Sea. Koall, who was nicknamed "Knall" (lit. 'bang'), joined the military of the Luftwaffe in 1935. Initially serving as an aerial observer, he was promoted to Oberleutnant (first lieutenant) in August 1939. Following fighter pilot training at the air combat school in Fürstenfeldbruck, (Note: Flight training in the Luftwaffe progressed through the levels A1, A2 and B1, B2, referred to as A/B flight training. A training included theoretical and practical training in aerobatics, navigation, long-distance flights and dead-stick landings. The B courses included high-altitude flights, instrument flights, night landings, and training to handle the aircraft in difficult situations.) Koall was posted to Jagdgeschwader 54 (JG 54—54th Fighter Wing) in January 1941 where he was assigned to 7. Staffel (7th squadron).

== World War II ==
On Friday 1 September 1939, German forces had invaded Poland starting World War II in Europe. In January 1941, III. Gruppe (3rd group) of JG 54, the Gruppe to which Koall's 7. Staffel was subordinated, was commanded by Hauptmann Arnold Lignitz while 7. Staffel was headed by Oberleutnant Günther Scholz. The Gruppe had been withdrawn from combat operations at the English Channel and had relocated to Dortmund Airfield on 4 December 1940 for a period of rest and replenishment. On 5 February 1941, III. Gruppe returned to combat on the English Channel.

On 29 March, the Gruppe was ordered to Graz-Thalerhof in preparation for the Balkans campaign. Operating from an airfield at Deta, III. Gruppe escorted bombers and dive bombers attacking Belgrade on 6 April. That day, Koall claimed a Royal Yugoslav Air Force Messerschmitt Bf 109 fighter shot down, his first aerial victory. The next day the Gruppe moved to Pécs, known as Fünfkirchen to the Germans. Flying from Fünfkirchen to the combat area near Banja Luka, Koall claimed a PZL P.11 aircraft shot down. (Note: According to Shores, Cull and Malizia, the aircraft shot down was a Ikarus IK-2 fighter.) On 20 April, III. Gruppe was withdrawn from combat operation, relocating to Belgrad-Semlin. On 4 May, the Gruppe began its transfer to Airfield Stolp-Reitz in Pomerania, present-day Słupsk, by train, arriving at Stolp-Reitz on 10 May.

=== War against the Soviet Union ===
At Stolp-Reitz, JG 54 upgraded their aircraft to the Bf 109 F-2. For the next four weeks, the pilots familiarized themselves with the new aircraft before on 15 June, III. Gruppe was ordered to Blumenfeld in East Prussia, present-day Karczarningken in the Kaliningrad Oblast, in preparation for Operation Barbarossa, the invasion of the Soviet Union. During the upcoming invasion, JG 54 would be deployed in the area of Army Group North, was subordinated to I. Fliegerkorps (1st Air Corps) and supported the 16th and 18th Army as well as the Panzer Group 4 in their strategic objective to reach Leningrad. On 22 June, the first day of the invasion, Koall made a belly landing at Łódź, renamed by the Nazis to Litzmannstadt, which damaged his Bf 109 F-2 (Werknummer 8230—factory number).

On 23 February 1942, Koall was appointed Staffelkapitän (squadron leader) of 3. Staffel of JG 54. He replaced Hauptmann Hans Schmoller-Haldy who had been wounded in combat that day. The Staffel was subordinated to I. Gruppe of JG 54 which was headed by Hauptmann Hans Philipp.

In mid-April 1943, a newly formed Jabostaffel (fighter bomber squadron) was formed and labeled 13.(Jabo) Staffel of JG 54 and placed under the command of Koall. This Staffel was then became the 10.(Jabo) Staffel of Jagdgeschwader 26 on 31 May before it became the 4.(Jabo) Staffel of JG 54 on 1 July. Initially, the Jabostaffel was based at Gatchina and was equipped with the Focke-Wulf Fw 190 A-5. The unit flew its first combat missions on 10 May. While serving in the Jabostaffel, Koall was awarded the German Cross in Gold (Deutsches Kreuz in Gold) on 17 October.

=== Group commander and death ===
In late-February 1944, Koall succeeded Hauptmann Siegfried Schnell as Gruppenkommandeur (group commander) of IV. Gruppe of JG 54 after Schnell had been killed in action on 25 February. In parallel, his former 4.(Jabo) Staffel was integrated into IV. Gruppe, thus becoming the newly formed 12. Staffel of JG 54. Command of this Staffel initially remained vacant until Oberleutnant Rudolf Klemm was appointed on 5 June. On 26 May, command of IV. Gruppe was passed on to Major Wolfgang Späte and Koall transferred to I. Gruppe of Jagdgeschwader 101. On 10 October, he was awarded the Knight's Cross of the Iron Cross (Ritterkreuz des Eisernen Kreuzes). In January 1945, Koall was given command of II. Gruppe of Ergänzungs-Jagdgeschwader 1, a fighter pilot training unit. On 30 November 1944, Koall attended a meeting held by the Inspector of Day Fighters, Oberst Günther Lützow at the Altemburg Airfield. Lützow had invited the commanding officers of various Luftwaffe training units to discuss the status of fighter pilot training. Among others, the meeting was attended by Karl-Heinz Schnell, Hans von Hahn, Reinhard Seiler, Rolf Hermichen and Josef Fözö.

On 25 April 1945 during the Battle of the Oder–Neisse, Koall was appointed Gruppenkommandeur of IV. Sturmgruppe of Jagdgeschwader 3 "Udet" (JG 3—3rd Fighter Wing). He replaced Oberleutnant Oskar Romm who had been severely injured the day before. The next day, the Sturmgruppe retreated from Prenzlau to an airfield at Greifswald. On 27 April, Koall was killed in action when his Fw 190 was shot down by Soviet anti-aircraft artillery near Anklam. Command of the Sturmgruppe was then given to Hauptmann Günther Schack on 1 May.

== Summary of career ==
=== Aerial victory claims ===
According to Obermaier, Koall was credited with at least 38 aerial victories claimed in an unknown number of combat missions. With the exception of two claims over Yugoslavia, all of his aerial victories were claimed on the Eastern Front. Mathews and Foreman, authors of Luftwaffe Aces — Biographies and Victory Claims, researched the German Federal Archives and found documentation for 37 aerial victory claims. This number includes 35 claims on the Eastern Front and two over the Western Allies in Yugoslavia.

Victory claims were logged to a map-reference (PQ = Planquadrat), for example "PQ 1011". The Luftwaffe grid map (Jägermeldenetz) covered all of Europe, western Russia and North Africa and was composed of rectangles measuring 15 minutes of latitude by 30 minutes of longitude, an area of about 360 square miles (930 km^{2}). These sectors were then subdivided into 36 smaller units to give a location area 3 km × 4 km (1.9 mi × 2.5 mi) in size.

Chronicle of aerial victories
This and the ? (question mark) indicates information discrepancies listed by Prien, Stemmer, Rodeike, Bock, Mathews and Foreman.
Claim	Date	Time	Type	Location	Claim	Date	Time	Type	Location
– 7. Staffel of Jagdgeschwader 54 – Balkan Campaign — 29 March – 3 May 1941
1	6 April 1941	17:15	Bf 109		2	7 April 1941	14:25	PZL P.11	
– Stab III. Gruppe of Jagdgeschwader 54 – Operation Barbarossa — 22 June – 5 December 1941
3	23 June 1941	11:50? (Note: According to Mathews and Foreman claimed at 16:15 over a Curtiss P-40 Warhawk.)	I-15?		6	24 July 1941	17:20	SB-2	west of Dno
4	7 July 1941	08:02	SB-3		7	19 November 1941? (Note: According to Mathews and Foreman claimed on 11 November 1941 at 08:46.)	08:40?	PS-84	
5? (Note: This claim is not listed by Mathews and Foreman.)	14 July 1941	16:15	DB-3		8	30 November 1941	10:15	I-16	
? (Note: This claim is not listed by Prien, Stemmer, Rodeike and Bock.)	23 July 1941	11:50	SB-2						
– Stab III. Gruppe of Jagdgeschwader 54 – Eastern Front — 6 December 1941 – 20 February 1942
9	27 February 1942	10:30	P-40	Krupitschina/Poroschki					
– 3. Staffel of Jagdgeschwader 54 – Eastern Front — 23 February – 30 April 1942
10	13 March 1942	11:25	P-40		11	15 March 1942	11:50	I-16	
– 3. Staffel of Jagdgeschwader 54 – Eastern Front — 1 May 1942 – 3 February 1943
12	20 July 1942	19:05	I-180 (Yak-7)		18	26 September 1942	10:00	I-16	PQ 1011
13	20 July 1942	19:08	LaGG-3		19	15 January 1943	07:50	Hurricane	PQ 00252; 15 km (9.3 mi) west-southwest of Shlisselburg
14	2 August 1942	13:00	I-180 (Yak-7)	PQ 00154; 10 km (6.2 mi) south of Leningrad	20	15 January 1943	08:00	La-5	PQ 00233; 10 km (6.2 mi) west of Shlisselburg
15	2 August 1942	13:20	MiG-3	PQ 00161; 10 km (6.2 mi) southeast of Leningrad	21	15 January 1943	13:30	Il-2	PQ 10164 southeast of Shlisselburg
16	24 August 1942	17:31	Yak-1	PQ 47842; 10 km (6.2 mi) south of Zubtsov	22	23 January 1943	13:49	Il-2	PQ 10153 southeast of Shlisselburg
17	25 August 1942	08:00	Yak-1	PQ 47852; 10 km (6.2 mi) southeast of Zubtsov	23	23 January 1943	14:05	I-16	PQ 00262; 10 km (6.2 mi) southwest of Shlisselburg
– 3. Staffel of Jagdgeschwader 54 – Eastern Front — 4 February – 17 April 1943
24	9 February 1943	09:15	I-16	PQ 36 Ost 00412; 10 km (6.2 mi) east of Pushkin	27	16 March 1943	07:12	LaGG-3	PQ 35 Ost 18242; 20 km (12 mi) southeast of Staraya Russa
25	9 February 1943	11:25	Spitfire	PQ 36 Ost 00274; 15 km (9.3 mi) northeast of Pushkin	28	16 March 1943	07:15	La-5	PQ 35 Ost 18271; 25 km (16 mi) southeast of Staraya Russa
26	19 February 1943	11:22	La-5	PQ 36 Ost 00273; 15 km (9.3 mi) northeast of Pushkin					
– 4.(Jabo) Staffel of Jagdgeschwader 54 – Eastern Front — 1 May – 31 December 1943
29	27 July 1943	08:20	LaGG-3	PQ 36 Ost 00263; 10 km (6.2 mi) southwest of Shlisselburg	31	7 September 1943	14:40	Il-2	PQ 35 Ost 18113; 15 km (9.3 mi) southwest of Staraya Russa
30	14 August 1943	06:48	LaGG-3	PQ 36 Ost 00431; 10 km (6.2 mi) southwest of Mga	32	7 September 1943	14:42	Il-2	Tuleblja - Aleksino
– Stab IV. Gruppe of Jagdgeschwader 54 – Eastern Front — 26 February – 26 May 1944
33	25 March 1944	11:00	Yak-4	PQ 25 Ost 79243; Lake Peipus	36	4 April 1944	16:00	Il-2	PQ 25 Ost 88363; 20 km (12 mi) southwest of Selo
34	1 April 1944	09:30	Yak-9	southeast of Pleskau	37	20 May 1944	12:35	Il-2	PQ 25 Ost 98724; 55 km (34 mi) southeast of Ostrov
35	4 April 1944	09:05	Il-2	PQ 25 Ost 88362; 20 km (12 mi) southwest of Selo					

=== Awards ===
- Iron Cross (1939) 2nd and 1st Class
- Honor Goblet of the Luftwaffe on 1 March 1943 as Hauptmann and Staffelkapitän
- German Cross in Gold o 17 October 1943 as Hauptmann in II./Jagdgeschwader 54
- Knight's Cross of the Iron Cross on 10 October 1944 as Hauptmann and Gruppenkommandeur of the IV./Jagdgeschwader 54

== Notes ==
Military offices
Preceded by Hauptmann Siegfried Schnell	Acting Commander of IV. Gruppe of Jagdgeschwader 54; February 1944 – 1 May 1944	Succeeded by Major Wolfgang Späte
Preceded by Major Otto Bertram	Commander of I. Gruppe of Jagdgeschwader 101; 1 May 1944 – 15 January 1945	Succeeded by Hauptmann Ferdinand Vögl
Preceded by Oberleutnant Oskar Romm	Commander of IV. Gruppe of Jagdgeschwader 3 "Udet"; 25 April 1945 – 27 April 1945	Succeeded by Hauptmann Günther Schack
