= Hans "Assi" Hahn =

German World War II fighter pilot

Hans Hahn
- Hahn as a Hauptmann
- Born: 14 April 1914; Gotha, Saxe-Coburg and Gotha, German Empire
- Died: 18 December 1982 (aged 68); Munich, Bavaria, West Germany
- Relatives: Heinrich von Vietinghoff (father-in-law)
- Military career
- Allegiance: Nazi Germany
- Branch: Army (1934–1935); Luftwaffe (1935–1945)
- Service years: 1934–1945
- Rank: Major (major)
- Nickname: Assi
- Units: JG 2, JG 54
- Commands: 4./JG 2, III./JG 2, II./JG 54
- Conflicts: See battles: World War II Battle of France Battle of Britain Eastern Front (POW)
- Awards: Knight's Cross of the Iron Cross with Oak Leaves

Hans Robert Fritz Hahn (14 April 1914 – 18 December 1982) who was nicknamed "Assi" was a German Luftwaffe military aviator during World War II, a fighter ace credited with 108 enemy aircraft shot down in 560 combat missions. He claimed 66 victories over the Western Front, of which 53 were Supermarine Spitfires. Of the 42 victories he recorded over the Eastern Front, at least seven were Il-2 Sturmovik ground-attack aircraft.

Born in Gotha, where he was educated at the Ernestine Gymnasium, in 1934 Hahn volunteered for military service in the Wehrmacht of the Third Reich. Initially serving in the Heer (Army), he transferred to the Luftwaffe (Air Force) in late 1935. Following flight training, he was posted to Jagdgeschwader 134 "Horst Wessel" (JG 134—134th Fighter Wing) in April 1936. In November 1937, Hahn was posted as a flight instructor to the Jagdfliegerschule (fighter flying school) at Werneuchen. On 1 February 1939, he was transferred to the Stabstaffel of I. Gruppe (1st group) of Jagdgeschwader 3 (JG 3—3rd Fighter Wing), based at Merseburg. Hahn transferred to Jagdgeschwader 2 (JG 2—2nd Fighter Wing) "Richthofen" on 11 October 1939 and on 15 December, he was appointed Staffelkapitän (squadron leader) of 4. Staffel of JG 2 "Richthofen". There he claimed his first victory on 14 May 1940, during the Battle of France, over a Royal Air Force Hawker Hurricane fighter. He claimed five victories during the French campaign and further victories during the Battle of Britain which led to the presentation of the Knight's Cross of the Iron Cross on 20 September 1940. On 29 October 1940, Hahn took command of III. Gruppe of JG 2 "Richthofen" as Gruppenkommandeur (group commander). Following his 41st aerial victory he was awarded the Knight's Cross of the Iron Cross with Oak Leaves on 14 August 1941. Legally, it was Germany's highest military decoration at the time of its presentation to Hahn. (Note: Until late September 1941, the Knight's Cross of the Iron Cross with Oak Leaves was second only to the Grand Cross of the Iron Cross (Großkreuz des Eisernen Kreuzes), which was awarded only to senior commanders for winning a major battle or campaign, in the military order of the Third Reich. The Knight's Cross of the Iron Cross with Oak Leaves as highest military order was surpassed on 28 September 1941 by the Knight's Cross of the Iron Cross with Oak Leaves and Swords (Ritterkreuz des Eisernen Kreuzes mit Eichenlaub und Schwertern).) On 16 September 1942, Hahn claimed his 66th and last victory on the Western Front. Hahn was then appointed Gruppenkommandeur of II. Gruppe of Jagdgeschwader 54 (JG 54—54th Fighter Wing) operating on the Eastern Front. Over the next three months, he claimed 42 further victories, which included his 100th on 27 January 1943.

On 21 February 1943, Hahn made a forced landing following combat with Soviet fighters and was taken prisoner of war. He remained in captivity until late 1950. Following his release, Hahn wrote his memoirs "I Speak the Truth" (Ich spreche die Wahrheit) recounted his detailed life in Soviet captivity. He then became a successful businessman before retiring in 1977 to the south of France. He died of cancer on 18 December 1982 in Munich.

== Early life and career ==
Hahn was born on 14 April 1914 in Gotha, at the time in Saxe-Coburg and Gotha, present-day in Thuringia. His parents were Arthur, a Finanzrat (Fiscal Council), and his mother Helene. He also had an older sister named Käte. A talented athlete, he was selected to participate in the 1936 Summer Olympics in Berlin in the Pentathlon, but he had to withdraw due to illness. His friends initially nicknamed him "Hansi", a diminutive of his first name Hans, which over time was abbreviated and altered to "Assi".

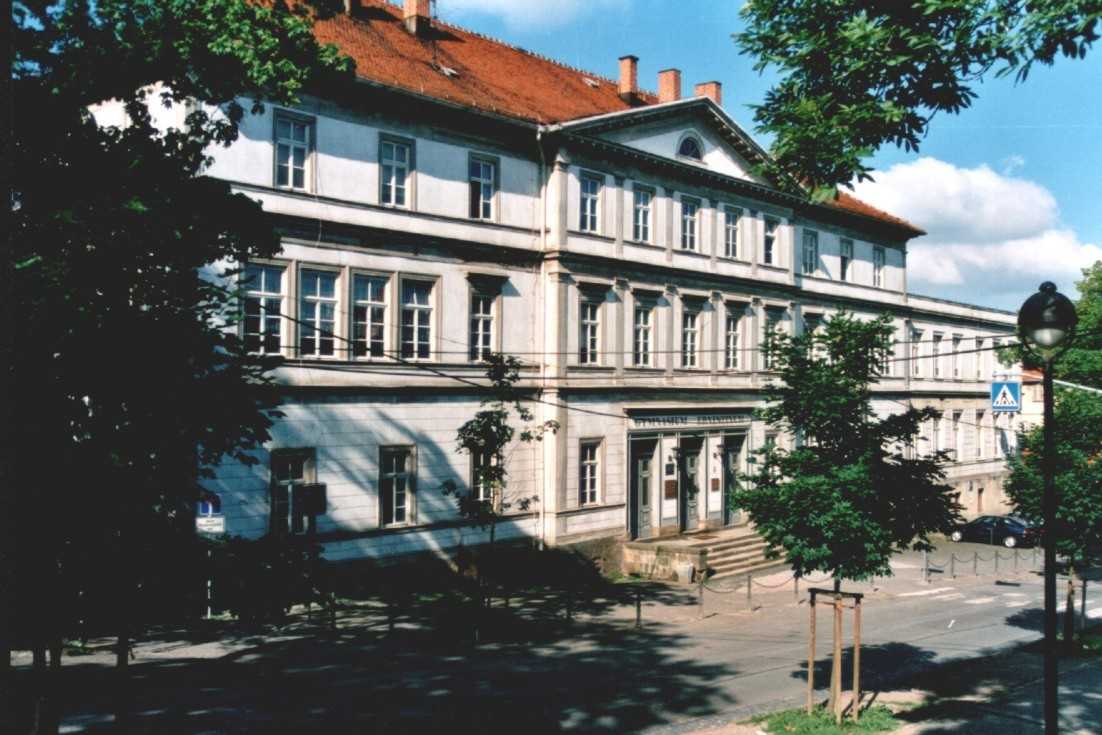
Hahn attended the Ernestinum Gymnasium in Gotha.

Hahn enlisted in the Reichswehr on 1 April 1934, as a Fahnenjunker (officer candidate) in 14. (Badisches) Infanterie-Regiment (14th Infantry Regiment). On 1 December 1934, he was promoted to Unteroffizier (corporal). From January to October 1935 he attended the Kriegsschule (war college) in Munich and was promoted to Oberfähnrich (master sergeant) on 1 October 1935. In November 1935, Hahn transferred to the Luftwaffe, and underwent flight training at Celle. He was promoted to Leutnant (second lieutenant) on 1 April 1936. On 15 April 1936, Hahn was posted to 4. Staffel (4th squadron) of Jagdgeschwader 134 "Horst Wessel" (JG 134—134th Fighter Wing), (Note: For an explanation of Luftwaffe unit designations see Organization of the Luftwaffe during World War II.) named after the martyr of the Nazi movement Horst Wessel. The unit was based at Werl near Dortmund. There he flew the Arado Ar 65, Ar 68 and the then new Messerschmitt Bf 109, first the B later the D-1 variant. This assignment ended on 31 October 1937.

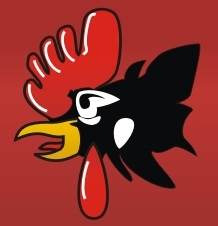
Hahn's emblem

From 1 November 1937 to 1 April 1938, Hahn served as a flight instructor and Staffelführer (flight leader) of 1. Staffel in the newly created Jagdfliegerschule (fighter flying school) at Werneuchen. Acknowledging his leadership skill, he was promoted to Oberleutnant (first lieutenant) on 1 February 1939. He was then transferred to the Stabstaffel of I. Gruppe (1st group) of Jagdgeschwader 3 (JG 3—3rd Fighter Wing), based at Merseburg. There Hahn introduced his personal emblem of a rooster's head. Hahn in German literally translates in English to rooster.

On 11 October 1939, the creation of new II. Gruppe of Jagdgeschwader 2 "Richthofen" (JG 2—2nd Fighter Wing), named after the World War I fighter ace Manfred von Richthofen, was ordered. The Gruppe was formed on 15 December from elements of I. Gruppe of JG 2 "Richthofen" and I. Gruppe of JG 3, at Zerbst and placed under the command of Hauptmann Wolfgang Schellmann. In consequence, Hahn was appointed Staffelkapitän (squadron leader) of 4. Staffel of JG 2 "Richthofen" on 15 December 1939.

== World War II ==
World War II in Europe began on Friday, 1 September 1939, when German forces invaded Poland. In February 1940, II. Gruppe of JG 2 "Richthofen" relocated to Nordholz. Following the start of the Battle of France on 10 May, the Gruppe moved to Münster and then to airfields in Belgium. Hahn claimed his first victory on 14 May 1940 over a Royal Air Force (RAF) Hawker Hurricane fighter. On 30 May, Hahn was awarded the Iron Cross 2nd Class (Eisernes Kreuz zweiter Klasse).

Hahn would claim five victories during the Battle of France, before becoming even more successful in the Battle of Britain. After 20 claims by September 1940, Hahn was awarded the Knight's Cross of the Iron Cross (Ritterkreuz des Eisernen Kreuzes) on 24 September, the fourth recipient of JG 2 to receive this distinction. Together with Hauptmann Wolfgang Lippert, the presentation was made by Reichsmarschall Hermann Göring, the Commander-in-Chief of the Luftwaffe, at his residence Carinhall. He then was invited by the mayor of Gotha to sign the cities Guestbook (Goldenes Buch)—a book signed in German communities and cities by special guests of honor.

=== Group commander ===
On 28 October, Hahn was appointed Gruppenkommandeur (group commander) of III. Gruppe of JG 2, succeeding Hauptmann Otto Bertram who was transferred. In consequence, command of 4. Staffel was passed on to Oberleutnant Jürgen Hepe. The next day, Hahn was promoted to Hauptmann (captain). At the time, the Gruppe was based at Bernay close to the English Channel. Hahn claimed his first aerial victory in his new capacity on 6 November when he shot down a Hurricane fighter southeast of Southampton. In late April-1941, III. Gruppe was equipped with then new Bf 109 F-2.

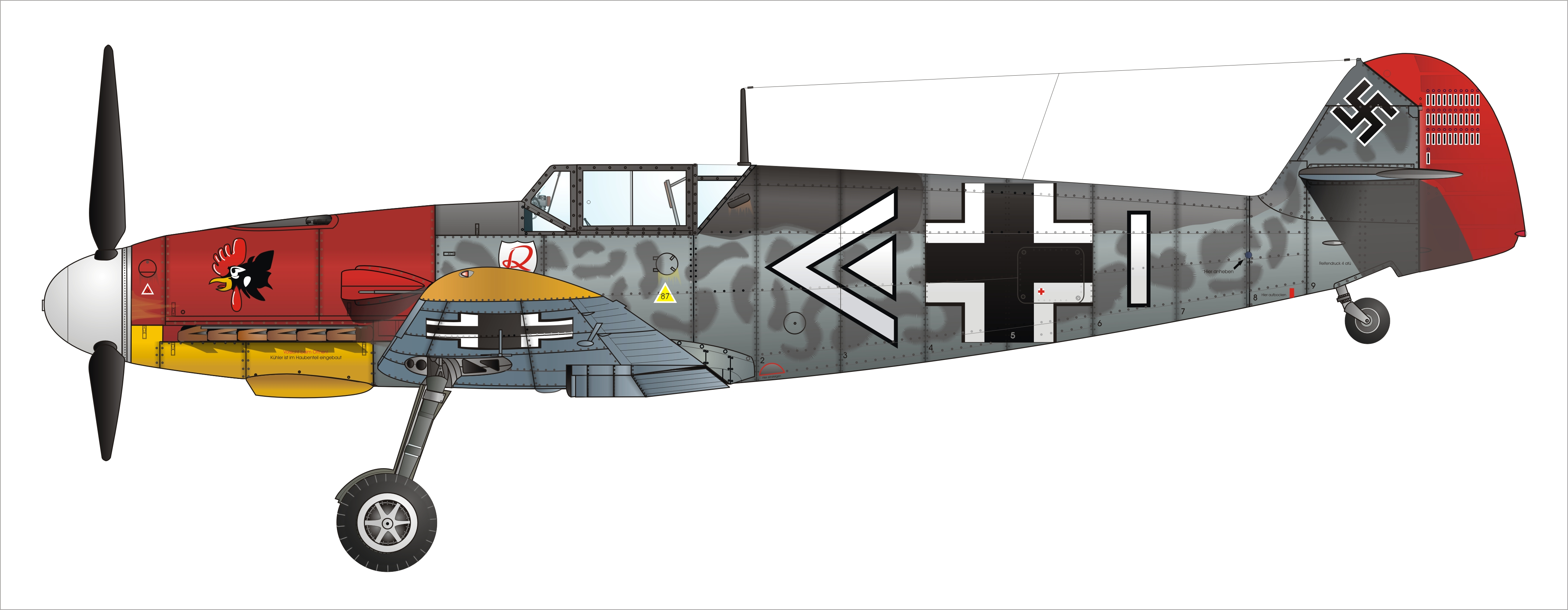
Messerschmitt Bf 109 F-2, Hans Hahn, France 1941

Hahn claimed three RAF Supermarine Spitfire fighters shot down on 12 August. Two days later, he was awarded the Knight's Cross of the Iron Cross with Oak Leaves (Ritterkreuz des Eisernen Kreuzes mit Eichenlaub). He was the second pilot of JG 2 and 32nd member of the German armed forces to be so honored. The presentation was made on 27 August 1941 by Hitler at the Führer Headquarter Wolfsschanze in Rastenburg (now Kętrzyn in Poland). Also present at the award ceremony were the fighter pilots Oberleutnant Hans Philipp and Oberleutnant Heinz Bär who were also awarded the Oak Leaves to the Knight's Cross.

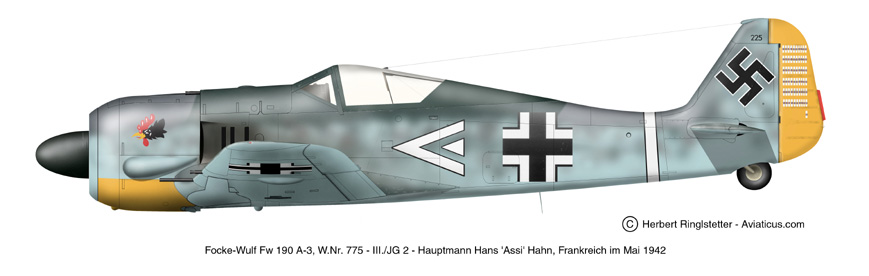
Focke-Wulf Fw 190 A-3 of Hauptmann Hahn, JG 2

On 15 February 1942, III. Gruppe moved to an airfield at Théville where the Gruppe flew fighter protection over the Cotentin Peninsula. In May, the Gruppe converted to the Focke-Wulf Fw 190 A variant, a radial engine powered fighter aircraft. III. Gruppe of JG 2 intercepted a RAF "Circus" mission headed for Caen. On this mission, Hahn claimed two of the four Spitfire fighters shot down. On 6 June, the RAF flew a "Circus" mission to Cherbourg which was intercepted by III. Gruppe, claiming thirteen Spitfire fighters shot down, including three by Hahn. On 16 July, Hahn was awarded the German Cross in Gold (Deutsches Kreuz in Gold).

On 6 September, III. Gruppe moved to an airfield at Poix-de-Picardie. Hahn claimed a Spitfire fighter on 16 September 1942 to record his 66th claim over the Western Front. Two Spitfires were lost that day; one was shot down by Jagdgeschwader 26 "Schlageter" (JG 26—26th Fighter Wing) near Le Treport, while Spitfire Vb AB859 from No. 122 Squadron, piloted by Sgt G. Nadan crashed, owing to unknown reasons. On 1 November, Hahn was transferred and relinquished command of III. Gruppe to Oberleutnant Egon Mayer.

=== Eastern Front ===
On 1 November 1942, Hahn was appointed Gruppenkommandeur of II. Gruppe of Jagdgeschwader 54 (JG 54—54th Fighter Wing). He replaced Hauptmann Dietrich Hrabak who was transferred to command Jagdgeschwader 52 (JG 52—52nd Fighter Wing). At the time, the Gruppe was based at Rjelbitzi Airfield, located 26 kilometers (16 miles) north of Dno and 15 kilometers (9.3 miles) west-southwest of Soltsy on the northern bank of the Shelon, an airfield south of Leningrad and west of Lake Ilmen on the Eastern Front. The transfer request had been made by Oberstleutnant Hannes Trautloft, the Geschwaderkommodore (wing commander) of JG 54, a friend of Hahn who appreciated his leadership qualities. Hahn claimed his first aerial victories on the Eastern Front on 4 December in the combat area southeast of Staraya Russa. On two separate missions, he was credited with a Lavochkin-Gorbunov-Gudkov LaGG-3 fighter and three Ilyushin Il-2 ground-attack aircraft destroyed.

On 18 December, Hahn was promoted to Major (major), effective as of 1 January 1943. Hahn became an "ace-in-a-day" for the first time on 30 December 1942. That day, pilots of II. Gruppe claimed 31 aerial victories for the loss of one of their own. Depending on source, Hahn was either credited with five LaGG-3 fighters shot down, or four LaGG-3 fighters and a single Il-2 ground-attack aircraft. On 12 January 1943, Soviet forces launched Operation Iskra, also known as the second battle of Lake Ladoga, an operation which created a corridor into the besieged city Leningrad. Two days later, II. Gruppe flew their first combat missions in support of German ground forces, flying combat air patrols and ground support missions against Soviet resupply lines. That day, Hahn claimed seven Lavochkin La-5 fighters shot down in the area of Mga and Shlisselburg. Hahn claimed his 100th victory on 26 January. He was the 34th Luftwaffe pilot to achieve the century mark.

== Prisoner of war ==
Hahn documented his experiences as a prisoner of war upon his return in his narrative "I Speak the Truth" (Ich spreche die Wahrheit). The book begins with his last combat mission flown on 21 February 1943, and ends with his return in late 1949. According to his own account, on Sunday 21 February 1943, Hahn intended to fly to Riga for a meeting with the Luftflotte 1 (1st Air Fleet) commanding staff. Since he had not planned to fly operationally, he did not wear his regular combat dress and did not carry a sidearm that day. On his way to his aircraft, he ran into his wingman, Max Stotz, who informed him that the Heer (German Army) had just requested fighter support over the Demyansk combat area.

On 21 February 1943, Hahn encountered fighters near Staraya Russa. He shot down a La-5 fighter for his 108th victory before his aircraft received hits in the left wing. Disengaging from combat, Hahn's engine soon began overheating and he force-landed his Bf 109 G-2 (Werknummer 13949—factory number) in enemy territory south of Zaluchye. According to Soviet sources, Hahn was shot down by Soviet pilot Starshiy Leytenant Pavel Grazhdaninov of 169 IAP (169th Fighter Aviation Regiment), (Note: IAP—Istrebitelny Aviatsionny Polk (Fighter Aviation Regiment—Истребительный Авиационный Полк)) and his wingman Starshiy Serzhant Davydov. According to this report, Hahn had bailed out over Soviet territory was then captured and interrogated.

== Later life ==
Hahn was released as a prisoner of war shortly before Christmas 1950, returning home by train. Among others, he was welcomed by his son but learned that his first wife had left him for another man. He worked at the International Corporation of Bayer Leverkusen and later became a director of Wano Schwarzpulver Company, which manufactured gunpowder, at Kunigunde near Goslar. In 1971, he married Gisela von Vietinghoff, daughter of the former Generaloberst Heinrich von Vietinghoff. Hahn retired in 1977 and lived in southern France. He died of cancer on 18 December 1982 in Munich and was buried in Tirol, Austria with his lifelong friend Julius Meimberg speaking at the memorial service.

== Summary of career ==
=== Aerial victory claims ===
According to Spick, Hahn was credited with 108 aerial victories claimed in 560 combat missions. This figure includes 20 aerial victories during the Battle of France and Britain, further 48 aerial victories over the Western Front and 40 more on the Eastern Front. Mathews and Foreman, authors of Luftwaffe Aces — Biographies and Victory Claims, researched the German Federal Archives and found records for 105 aerial victory claims, plus five further unconfirmed claims. This figure includes 43 aerial victories on the Eastern Front and 62 over the Western Allies.

Victory claims were logged to a map-reference (PQ = Planquadrat), for example "PQ 05 Ost 1151". The Luftwaffe grid map (Jägermeldenetz) covered all of Europe, western Russia and North Africa and was composed of rectangles measuring 15 minutes of latitude by 30 minutes of longitude, an area of about 360 square miles (930 km^{2}). These sectors were then subdivided into 36 smaller units to give a location area 3 km × 4 km (1.9 mi × 2.5 mi) in size.

Chronicle of aerial victories
This and the ♠ (Ace of spades) indicates those aerial victories which made Hahn an "ace-in-a-day", a term which designates a fighter pilot who has shot down five or more airplanes in a single day. This and the – (dash) indicates unconfirmed aerial victory claims for which Hahn did not receive credit. This and the ? (question mark) indicates information discrepancies listed by Crandall, Prien, Stemmer, Rodeike, Bock, Mathews and Foreman.
Claim	Date	Time	Type	Location	Claim	Date	Time	Type	Location
– 4. Staffel of Jagdgeschwader 2 – Battle of France — 10 May – 25 June 1940
1	14 May 1940	09:55	Hurricane	Gembloux	3	3 June 1940	14:50	Hawk 75	east-northeast of Paris; Épernay
2	19 May 1940	12:18	Hurricane	Tournai	4	6 June 1940	20:35	Hawk 75	Roye
— (Note: According to Crandall, this claim is confirmed and is listed as his third aerial victory.)	19 May 1940	—	M.S.406	Tournai					
– 4. Staffel of Jagdgeschwader 2 – Action at the Channel and over England — 26 June – 28 October 1941
— (Note: This unconfirmed claim is not listed by Prien, Stemmer, Rodeike and Bock.)	2 July 1940	—	Hurricane	Hazebrouck	13	6 September 1940	10:05	Spitfire	Ashford
6? (Note: The numbering sequence used by Prien, Stemmer, Rodeike and Bock omits a 5th aerial victory. Subsequently the numbering range provided by the authors renders aerial victories labeled 1 to 4 and continues with the range 6 to 108.)	11 August 1940	11:45	Spitfire	Portland	14	7 September 1940	18:25	Spitfire	Gillingham
—	25 August 1940	18:30~	Spitfire	Dorchester	15? (Note: According to Mathews and Foreman this claim is unconfirmed.)	8 September 1940	15:35	Hurricane	London; Thorney Island
7	31 August 1940	09:00	Spitfire	Dover	16	11 September 1940	16:15	Hurricane	Staplehurst
8	31 August 1940	09:05	Spitfire	Dover	17	15 September 1940	15:35	Spitfire	Thorney Island
9	31 August 1940	19:05	Spitfire	Dover	18	20 September 1940	12:15	Hurricane	London
10	4 September 1940	10:15	Spitfire	Ashford	19	23 September 1940	10:30	Spitfire	London
11	4 September 1940	14:25	Spitfire	Margate	20	15 October 1940	13:35	Hurricane	Southampton
12	6 September 1940	10:00	Spitfire	Ashford					
– Stab III. Gruppe of Jagdgeschwader 2 – Action at the Channel and over England — 28 October 1940 – 21 June 1941
21	6 November 1940	15:50	Hurricane	east of Southampton					
– Stab III. Gruppe of Jagdgeschwader 2 – Action in the West — 22 June – 31 December 1941
22	24 June 1941	21:00	Spitfire	northwest of Calais	36	23 July 1941	20:23	Spitfire	west of Hesdin
23	25 June 1941	16:31	Spitfire	Marquise	37	5 August 1941	18:44	Spitfire	Calais
24	26 June 1941	11:55	Spitfire	Dunkirk	38	7 August 1941	18:17	Spitfire	Calais
25?	2 July 1941	—	Hurricane	Hazebrouck	39	12 August 1941	12:45	Spitfire	Gravelines
26	7 July 1941	15:36	Hurricane	7 km (4.3 mi) west of Le Touquet	40	12 August 1941	12:50	Spitfire	Cap Gris-Nez
27	7 July 1941	15:37	Hurricane	7–10 km (4.3–6.2 mi) west of Le Touquet	41	12 August 1941	18:51	Spitfire	Ramsgate
28	8 July 1941	15:52	Spitfire	Calais/Marck	42	20 September 1941	16:30	Spitfire	10 km (6.2 mi) off Somme Estuary
29	10 July 1941	12:08	Spitfire	Saint-Omer	43	20 September 1941	16:42	Spitfire	Somme Estuary
30	10 July 1941	12:12	Spitfire	Saint-Omer	44	20 September 1941	16:43	Spitfire	
31	21 July 1941	08:50	Spitfire	Gravelines	45	27 September 1941	15:35	Spitfire	
32	21 July 1941	20:45	Spitfire	Watten	46	2 October 1941	15:05	Spitfire	Pas-de-Calais
33	22 July 1941	13:45	Spitfire	Calais	47	2 October 1941	18:50	Spitfire	Pas-de-Calais
34	22 July 1941	13:53	Spitfire	Calais	48	2 October 1941	18:52	Spitfire	Pas-de-Calais
35	23 July 1941	20:20	Spitfire	west of Hesdin	49	13 October 1941	14:30	Spitfire	vicinity of Boulogne
– Stab III. Gruppe of Jagdgeschwader 2 – Action in the West — 1 January – 1 November 1942
50	12 February 1942	14:55	Spitfire		58	4 May 1942	10:46	Spitfire	
51	17 April 1942	16:08	Spitfire	vicinity of Calais	59	4 May 1942	15:55	Spitfire	
52	20 April 1942	17:07	Spitfire	Isle of Wight	60	6 May 1942	12:22	Spitfire	
53	22 April 1942	14:32	Spitfire		61	6 May 1942	12:24	Spitfire	
54	25 April 1942	16:24	Spitfire		62	6 June 1942	17:25	Spitfire	Cherbourg/Cap Lévi
55	25 April 1942	16:29	Spitfire		63	6 June 1942	17:25	Spitfire	Cherbourg/Cap Lévi
56	30 April 1942	17:27	Spitfire		64	6 June 1942	17:27	Spitfire	
57	4 May 1942	10:41	Spitfire		65	16 September 1942	13:15	Spitfire	PQ 05 Ost 1151
– Stab II. Gruppe of Jagdgeschwader 54 – Eastern Front — December 1942 – 3 February 1943
66	4 December 1942	10:45	LaGG-3	PQ 18231; 30 km (19 mi) east-southeast of Staraya Russa	84♠	14 January 1943	12:11	La-5	PQ 10271; 25 km (16 mi) east-southeast of Mga
67	4 December 1942	10:47	Il-2	PQ 18231; 30 km (19 mi) east-southeast of Staraya Russa	85♠	14 January 1943	12:12	La-5	PQ 10243; 25 km (16 mi) east-southeast of Schlüsselburg
68	4 December 1942	13:53	Il-2	PQ 18262; 30 km (19 mi) east-southeast of Staraya Russa	86♠	23 January 1943	11:10	La-5? (Note: According to Mathews and Foreman claimed as a Lavochkin-Gorbunov-Gudkov LaGG-3.)	east of Mga
69	4 December 1942	14:00	Il-2	PQ 2975	87♠	23 January 1943	11:15	La-5? (Note: According to Mathews and Foreman claimed as a Polikarpov R-5.)	19 km (12 mi) southwest of Schlüsselburg
70	12 December 1942	13:56	La-5	PQ 28113; 40 km (25 mi) northwest of Demyansk	88♠	23 January 1943	13:20	La-5	PQ 10171 vicinity of Mga
71	12 December 1942	13:58	Il-2	north of Lake Werchne; 40 km (25 mi) east-southeast of Staraya Russa	89♠	23 January 1943	13:22	La-5	PQ 10171 vicinity of Mga
72	29 December 1942	11:30	Il-2	PQ 28113; 40 km (25 mi) northwest of Demyansk	90♠	23 January 1943	13:25	La-5	PQ 1014
73	29 December 1942	11:50	LaGG-3	PQ 28122; 35 km (22 mi) northwest of Demyansk	91	24 January 1943	09:35	La-5	PQ 10192 east of Mga
74♠	30 December 1942	08:50	LaGG-3	PQ 18262; 30 km (19 mi) east-southeast of Staraya Russa	92	24 January 1943	09:40	La-5	PQ 10151 southeast of Schlüsselburg
75♠	30 December 1942	08:53	LaGG-3	PQ 28113; 40 km (25 mi) northwest of Demyansk	93	24 January 1943	09:42	La-5	PQ 10154 southeast of Schlüsselburg
76♠	30 December 1942	08:55	LaGG-3? (Note: According to Mathews and Foreman claimed as an Ilyushin Il-2.)	PQ 28114; 40 km (25 mi) south-southeast of Malaya Vishera	94	24 January 1943	13:55	La-5	PQ 00261; 10 km (6.2 mi) southwest of Schlüsselburg
77♠	30 December 1942	08:57	LaGG-3	PQ 29772; 25 km (16 mi) east-southeast of Staraya Russa	95	25 January 1943	09:45	La-5	PQ 10151 southeast of Schlüsselburg
78♠	30 December 1942	11:45? (Note: According to Mathews and Foreman claimed at 08:50.)	LaGG-3	PQ 18212	96	25 January 1943	09:47	La-5	PQ 10124 east of Schlüsselburg
79♠	14 January 1943	10:36	La-5	PQ 10104 southeast of Schlüsselburg	97	25 January 1943	09:48? (Note: According to Mathews and Foreman claimed at 09:49.)	LaGG-3	PQ 10111 vicinity of Schlüsselburg
80♠	14 January 1943	10:37	La-5	PQ 10193 east of Mga	98	26 January 1943	10:58	LaGG-3	PQ 10152 southeast of Schlüsselburg
81♠	14 January 1943	10:38	La-5	PQ 10193 east of Mga	99	26 January 1943	14:00	LaGG-3	PQ 10123 east of Schlüsselburg
82♠	14 January 1943	10:42	La-5	PQ 1181	100	26 January 1943	14:03	LaGG-3	PQ 10123 east of Schlüsselburg
83♠	14 January 1943	12:10	La-5	PQ 10163 southeast of Schlüsselburg	101	27 January 1943	10:43	LaGG-3	PQ 10111
– Stab II. Gruppe of Jagdgeschwader 54 – Eastern Front — February 1943
102	9 February 1943	13:10	P-40	PQ 36 Ost 00422; Pushkin/Mga	106	11 February 1943	10:08	LaGG-3	PQ 36 Ost 00271; 15 km (9.3 mi) northeast of Pushkin
103	9 February 1943	13:11	P-40	PQ 36 Ost 00434; 10 km (6.2 mi) southwest of Mga	107	19 February 1943	11:50	Il-2	PQ 35 Ost 28351; 10 km (6.2 mi) west of Demyansk
104	11 February 1943	09:52	P-40	PQ 36 Ost 00283; 20 km (12 mi) west of Mga	108	21 February 1943	09:11	La-5	PQ 35 Ost 18463; 30 km (19 mi) west of Demyansk
105	11 February 1943	09:58	P-40	PQ 36 Ost 00263; 10 km (6.2 mi) southwest of Schlüsselburg					

=== Awards ===
- Iron Cross (1939)
  - 2nd Class (30 May 1940)
  - 1st Class (13 June 1940)
- Front Flying Clasp of the Luftwaffe in Gold (26 April 1941)
- German Cross in Gold on 16 July 1942 as Hauptmann in the III./Jagdgeschwader 2
- Knight's Cross of the Iron Cross with Oak Leaves
  - Knight's Cross on 24 September 1940 as Oberleutnant and pilot in the 4./Jagdgeschwader 2 "Richthofen"
  - 32nd Oak Leaves on 14 August 1941 as Hauptmann and Gruppenkommandeur of the III./Jagdgeschwader 2 "Richthofen"

=== Dates of rank ===
1 April 1934:	Fahnenjunker
May 1934:	Fahnenjunker-Gefreiter
1 December 1934:	Fahnenjunker-Unteroffizier
1 October 1935:	Oberfähnrich
1 April 1936:	Leutnant (Second Lieutenant)
1 February 1939:	Oberleutnant (First Lieutenant)
29 October 1940:	Hauptmann (Captain)
1 January 1943:	Major (Major)

== Works ==
- Hahn, Assi (1951). Ich spreche die Wahrheit! [I speak the truth!] (in German). Esslingen, Germany: Bechtle. OCLC 686542.
