= Jagdfliegerschule =

The German Luftwaffe of the Wehrmacht had seven Jagdfliegerschulen or Fighter Pilot Schools.

== Jagdfliegerschule Werneuchen or Jagdfliegerschule 1 ==
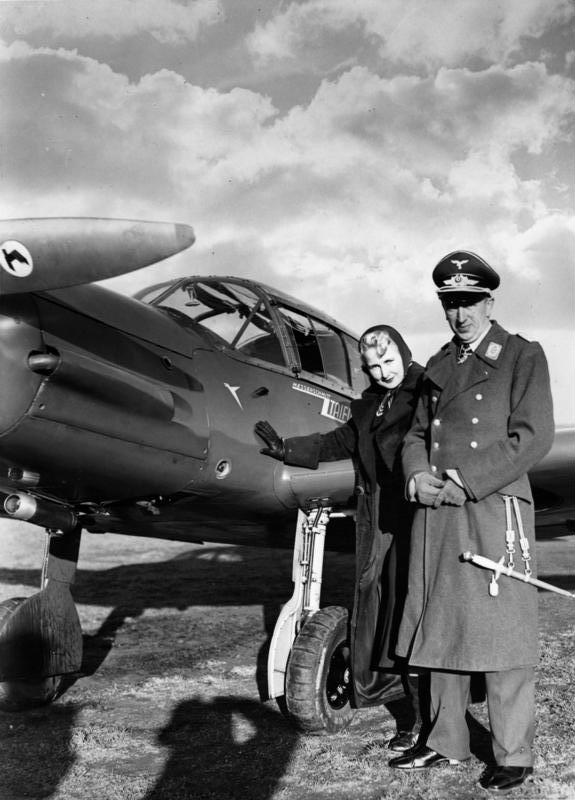
Theo Osterkamp with his wife, Fel Gudrun, with Messerschmitt Bf 108.

Jagdfliegerschule Werneuchen was formed on 1 November 1937 in Werneuchen consisting of 3 Staffeln (squadrons). The school was renamed to Jagdfliegerschule 1 on 15 January 1940. On 17 December 1941 an operation squadron (Einsatz-Staffel) was formed in Jever. This operational squadron then became part of an ad hoc formation called Jagdgruppe Losigkeit, led by Hauptmann Fritz Losigkeit, to protect a group of warships moving to Norway. Jagdgruppe Losigkeit was renamed to 10./Jagdgeschwader 1 in late March 1942. The entire school was renamed on 15 December 1942 and became Jagdgeschwader 101.

=== Commanding officers ===
- Oberst Theodor Osterkamp, 1 November 1937 – 20 November 1939
- Oberstleutnant Otto-Friedrich Freiherr von Houwald, 20 November 1939 – 15 December 1942

== Jagdfliegerschule Schleißheim or Jagdfliegerschule 2 ==
Jagdfliegerschule Schleißheim was formed on 1 April 1934 in Schleißheim and disbanded again on 9 June 1936. It was recreated again on 1 April 1939 consisting of 3 Staffeln (squadrons). The school was renamed to Jagdfliegerschule 2 on 15 January 1940. An operational Staffel was formed in 1941 at Zerbst. The Staffel was relocated to Düsseldorf-Lohausen on 24 June 1941 and to Kiel-Holtenau on 5 July 1941. The Staffel was disbanded at the end of 1941. The entire school was renamed on 24 February 1943 and became Jagdgeschwader 102.

=== Commanding officers ===
- Hauptmann Gottlob Müller, 1 April 1934 – 31 August 1934
- Major Josef Mai, 1 September 1934 – 4 October 1935
- Oberstleutnant Gerd von Massow, 5 October 1935 – 9 June 1936
- Oberst Hermann Frommherz, 1 April 1939 – 30 June 1941
- Major Ernst Freiherr von Berg, June 1941 – 4 January 1943
- Major Jürgen Roth, 5 January 1943 – 24 February 1943

== Jagdfliegerschule Stolp-Reitz or Jagdfliegerschule 3 ==
Jagdfliegerschule 3 was redesignated Jagdgeschwader 103 on 7 December 1942.

=== Commanding officers ===
- Oberstleutnant Siegfried Lehmann, 19 September 1939 – 21 December 1940
- Oberstleutnant Eitel-Friedrich Roediger von Manteuffel, 22 December 1940 – 28 May 1941
- Oberstleutnant Richard Kraut, 29 May 1941 – 28 October 1942
- Major Herbert Ihlefeld, 29 October 1942 – 6 December 1942

== Jagdfliegerschule Fürth or Jagdfliegerschule 4 ==
Jagdfliegerschule 4 was redesignated Jagdgeschwader 104 on 19 March 1943.

=== Commanding officers ===
- Oberstleutnant Rudolf Stoltenhoff, 16 January 1940 – 11 October 1940
- Oberstleutnant Max Ibel, 12 October 1940 – 5 June 1941
- Oberstleutnant Karl Vieck, 6 June 1941 – 30 June 1941
- Major Hubertus von Bonin, 1 July 1941 – 10 October 1941
- Major Hans Trübenbach, 15 October 1941 – 19 March 1943

== Jagdfliegerschule Wien-Schwechat or Jagdfliegerschule 5 ==
Jagdfliegerschule 5 was redesignated Jagdgeschwader 105 on 27 January 1943.

=== Commanding officers ===
- Generalmajor Eduard Ritter von Schleich, 15 December 1939 – 4 October 1940
- Oberstleutnant Hubert Merhart von Bernegg, 8 October 1940 – 10 December 1942
- Major Richard Leppla, 15 December 1942 – 24 February 1943

== Jagdfliegerschule 6 ==
Jagdfliegerschule 6 was created on 9 November 1942 in Lachen-Speyersdorf and was redesignated as Jagdgeschwader 106 on 19 March 1943.

=== Commanding officers ===
- Major Henning Strümpell, 9 November 1942 – 19 March 1943

== Jagdfliegerschule 7 ==
=== Commanding officers ===
- Major Georg Meyer, 12 October 1942 – 25 January 1943
