= List of Knight's Cross of the Iron Cross with Oak Leaves, Swords or Diamonds recipients of the Luftwaffe fighter force =

The Knight's Cross of the Iron Cross (German: Ritterkreuz des Eisernen Kreuzes) and its variants were the highest military award in Nazi Germany. Recipients are grouped by grades of the Knight's Cross. During World War II, 453 German day and bomber destroyer (Zerstörer) pilots, 85 night fighter pilots, including 14 crew members, were awarded the Knight's Cross of the Iron Cross. Among them, 130 pilots received the Knight's Cross of the Iron Cross with Oak Leaves (Ritterkreuz des Eisernen Kreuzes mit Eichenlaub), 34 the Knight's Cross of the Iron Cross with Oak Leaves and Swords (Ritterkreuz des Eisernen Kreuzes mit Eichenlaub und Schwertern), and nine won the Knight's Cross of the Iron Cross with Oak Leaves, Swords and Diamonds (Ritterkreuz des Eisernen Kreuzes mit Eichenlaub, Schwertern und Brillanten).

== Background ==
The Knight's Cross of the Iron Cross and its higher grades were based on four separate enactments. The first enactment, Reichsgesetzblatt I S. 1573 of 1 September 1939 instituted the Iron Cross (Eisernes Kreuz), the Knight's Cross of the Iron Cross and the Grand Cross of the Iron Cross (Großkreuz des Eisernen Kreuzes). Article 2 of the enactment mandated that the award of a higher class be preceded by the award of all preceding classes. As the war progressed, some of the recipients of the Knight's Cross distinguished themselves further and a higher grade, the Knight's Cross of the Iron Cross with Oak Leaves (Ritterkreuz des Eisernen Kreuzes mit Eichenlaub), was instituted. The Oak Leaves, as they were commonly referred to, were based on the enactment Reichsgesetzblatt I S. 849 of 3 June 1940. In 1941, two higher grades of the Knight's Cross were instituted. The enactment Reichsgesetzblatt I S. 613 of 28 September 1941 introduced the Knight's Cross of the Iron Cross with Oak Leaves and Swords (Ritterkreuz des Eisernen Kreuzes mit Eichenlaub und Schwertern) and the Knight's Cross of the Iron Cross with Oak Leaves, Swords and Diamonds (Ritterkreuz des Eisernen Kreuzes mit Eichenlaub, Schwertern und Brillanten). At the end of 1944 the final grade, the Knight's Cross of the Iron Cross with Golden Oak Leaves, Swords, and Diamonds (Ritterkreuz des Eisernen Kreuzes mit goldenem Eichenlaub, Schwertern und Brillanten), based on the enactment Reichsgesetzblatt 1945 I S. 11 of 29 December 1944, became the final variant of the Knight's Cross authorized.

== Recipients ==
The Oberkommando der Wehrmacht kept separate Knight's Cross lists, one for each of the three military branches, Heer (Army), Kriegsmarine (Navy), Luftwaffe (Air force) and for the Waffen-SS. Within each of these lists a unique sequential number was assigned to each recipient. The same numbering paradigm was applied to the higher grades of the Knight's Cross, one list per grade.

=== Knight's Cross with Oak Leaves, Swords and Diamonds ===
The Knight's Cross with Oak Leaves, Swords and Diamonds is based on the enactment Reichsgesetzblatt I S. 613 of 28 September 1941 to reward those servicemen who had already been awarded the Oak Leaves with Swords to the Knight's Cross of the Iron Cross. Ultimately, it would be awarded to twenty-seven German soldiers, sailors and airmen, ranging from young fighter pilots to field marshals. Nine recipients were fighter pilots.

| Number | Name | Rank | Unit | Date of award | Notes | Picture |
|---|---|---|---|---|---|---|
| 1 | Werner Mölders | Oberst | Geschwaderkommodore of Jagdgeschwader 51 | 15 July 1941 (Note: According to Scherzer on 16 July 1941.) | — | |
| 2 | Adolf Galland | Oberst | Geschwaderkommodore of Jagdgeschwader 26 "Schlageter" | 28 January 1942 | — | |
| 3 | Gordon Gollob | Major | Geschwaderkommodore of Jagdgeschwader 77 | 30 August 1942 | — | |
| 4 | Hans-Joachim Marseille | Oberleutnant | Staffelkapitän of the 3./Jagdgeschwader 27 | 3 September 1942 | — | |
| 5 | Hermann Graf | Oberleutnant of the Reserves | Staffelkapitän of the 9./Jagdgeschwader 52 | 16 September 1942 | — | |
| 8 | Walter Nowotny | Hauptmann | Gruppenkommandeur of the I./Jagdgeschwader 54 | 19 October 1943 | — | |
| 15 | Helmut Lent | Oberstleutnant | Geschwaderkommodore of Nachtjagdgeschwader 3 | 31 July 1944 | — | |
| 18 | Erich Hartmann | Oberleutnant | Staffelkapitän of the 9./Jagdgeschwader 52 | 25 August 1944 | — | |
| 21 | Heinz-Wolfgang Schnaufer | Hauptmann | Gruppenkommandeur of the IV./Nachtjagdgeschwader 1 | 16 October 1944 | — | |

=== Knight's Cross with Oak Leaves and Swords ===
The Knight's Cross with Oak Leaves and Swords is also based on the enactment (Reichsgesetzblatt I S. 613) of 28 September 1941 to reward those servicemen who had already been awarded the Oak Leaves to the Knight's Cross of the Iron Cross. The list is initially sorted by the chronological number assigned to the recipient.

| Number | Name | Rank | Unit | Date of award | Notes | Picture |
|---|---|---|---|---|---|---|
| 1 | Adolf Galland | Oberstleutnant | Geschwaderkommodore of Jagdgeschwader 26 "Schlageter" | 21 June 1941 | Awarded 2nd Diamonds 28 January 1942 | |
| 2 | Werner Mölders | Major | Geschwaderkommodore of Jagdgeschwader 51 | 22 June 1941 | Awarded 1st Diamonds 15 July 1941 | |
| 3 | Walter Oesau | Hauptmann | Gruppenkommandeur of the III./Jagdgeschwader 3 | 15 July 1941 (Note: According to Scherzer on 16 July 1941) | — | |
| 4 | Günther Lützow | Major | Geschwaderkommodore of Jagdgeschwader 3 | 11 October 1941 | — | |
| 7 | Heinrich Bär | Hauptmann | Staffelkapitän of the 1./Jagdgeschwader 51 "Mölders" | 16 February 1942 | — | |
| 8 | Hans Philipp | Hauptmann | Gruppenkommandeur of the I./Jagdgeschwader 54 | 12 March 1942 | — | |
| 9 | Herbert Ihlefeld | Hauptmann | Gruppenkommandeur of the I./Jagdgeschwader 77 | 24 April 1942 | — | |
| 10 | Max-Hellmuth Ostermann | Oberleutnant | Staffelkapitän of the 7./Jagdgeschwader 54 | 17 May 1942 | — | |
| 11 | Hermann Graf | Leutnant of the Reserves | Staffelkapitän of the 9./Jagdgeschwader 52 | 19 May 1942 (Note: According to Scherzer on 18 May 1942.) | Awarded 5th Diamonds 16 September 1942 | |
| 12 | Hans-Joachim Marseille | Oberleutnant | Staffelkapitän of the 3./Jagdgeschwader 27 | 18 June 1942 | Awarded 4th Diamonds 3 September 1942 | |
| 13 | Gordon Gollob | Hauptmann | Geschwaderkommodore of Jagdgeschwader 77 | 23 June 1942 | Awarded 3rd Diamonds 30 August 1942 | |
| 14 | Leopold Steinbatz | Oberfeldwebel | pilot in the 9./Jagdgeschwader 52 | 23 June 1942* | Killed in action 15 June 1942 | |
| 19 | Joachim Müncheberg | Hauptmann | deputy Geschwaderkommodore of Jagdgeschwader 51 | 9 September 1942 | — | |
| 23 | Wolf-Dietrich Wilcke | Major | Geschwaderkommodore of Jagdgeschwader 3 "Udet" | 23 December 1942 | — | |
| 32 | Helmut Lent | Major | Gruppenkommandeur of the IV./Nachtjagdgeschwader 1 | 2 August 1943 | Awarded 15th Diamonds 31 July 1944 | |
| 34 | Günther Rall | Hauptmann | Gruppenkommandeur of the III./Jagdgeschwader 52 | 12 September 1943 | — | |
| 37 | Walter Nowotny | Hauptmann | Gruppenkommandeur of the I./Jagdgeschwader 54 | 22 September 1943 | Awarded 8th Diamonds 19 October 1943 | |
| 43 | Hajo Herrmann | Oberst | Inspekteur der deutschen Luftverteidigung | 23 January 1944 | — | |
| 44 | Heinrich Prinz zu Sayn-Wittgenstein | Major | Geschwaderkommodore of Nachtjagdgeschwader 2 | 23 January 1944* | Killed in action 21 January 1944 | |
| 51 | Egon Mayer | Oberstleutnant | Geschwaderkommodore of Jagdgeschwader 2 "Richthofen" | 2 March 1944* | Killed in action 2 March 1944 | |
| 52 | Gerhard Barkhorn | Hauptmann | Gruppenkommandeur of the II./Jagdgeschwader 52 | 2 March 1944 | — | |
| 54 | Werner Streib | Major | Geschwaderkommodore of Nachtjagdgeschwader 1 | 11 March 1944 | — | |
| 73 | Josef Priller | Oberstleutnant | Geschwaderkommodore of Jagdgeschwader 26 "Schlageter" | 2 July 1944 | — | |
| 75 | Erich Hartmann | Oberleutnant | Staffelkapitän of the 9./Jagdgeschwader 52 | 2 July 1944 | Awarded 18th Diamonds 25 August 1944 | |
| 78 | Anton Hackl | Major | Gruppenkommandeur of the III./Jagdgeschwader 11 | 9 July 1944 (Note: According to Scherzer on 12 July 1944.) | — | |
| 82 | Johannes Steinhoff | Oberstleutnant | Geschwaderkommodore of Jagdgeschwader 77 | 28 July 1944 | — | |
| 84 | Heinz-Wolfgang Schnaufer | Hauptmann | Gruppenkommandeur of the IV./Nachtjagdgeschwader 1 | 30 July 1944 | Awarded 21st Diamonds 16 October 1944 | |
| 88 | Kurt Bühligen | Major | Geschwaderkommodore of Jagdgeschwader 2 "Richthofen" | 14 August 1944 | — | |
| 108 | Josef Wurmheller | Hauptmann | Gruppenkommandeur of the III./Jagdgeschwader 2 "Richthofen" | 24 October 1944* | Killed in action 22 June 1944 | |
| 113 | Otto Kittel | Oberleutnant | Staffelkapitän of the 2./Jagdgeschwader 54 | 25 November 1944 | — | — |
| 126 | Erich Rudorffer | Major | Gruppenkommandeur of the II./Jagdgeschwader 54 | 26 January 1945 | — | |
| 130 | Ernst-Wilhelm Reinert | Oberleutnant | Staffelkapitän of the 14./Jagdgeschwader 27 | 1 February 1945 | — | |
| (144) | Werner Schröer | Major | Geschwaderkommodore of Jagdgeschwader 3 "Udet" | 19 April 1945 | — | |
| (145) | Wilhelm Batz | Major | Gruppenkommandeur of the II./Jagdgeschwader 52 | 21 April 1945 | — | — |

=== Knight's Cross with Oak Leaves ===
The Knight's Cross with Oak Leaves was based on the enactment Reichsgesetzblatt I S. 849 of 3 June 1940. The last officially announced number for the Oak Leaves was 843.

This along with the * (asterisk) indicates that the Knight's Cross with Oak Leaves was awarded posthumously.

| Number | Name | Rank | Unit | Date of award | Notes | Picture |
|---|---|---|---|---|---|---|
| 2 | Werner Mölders | Major | Geschwaderkommodore of Jagdgeschwader 51 | 21 September 1940 | Awarded 2nd Swords 22 June 1941; 1st Diamonds 15 July 1941 (Note: According to Scherzer 1st Diamonds on 16 July 1941.) | |
| 3 | Adolf Galland | Major | Geschwaderkommodore of Jagdgeschwader 26 "Schlageter" | 24 September 1940 | Awarded 1st Swords 21 June 1941; 2nd Diamonds 28 January 1942 | |
| 4 | Helmut Wick | Hauptmann | Gruppenkommandeur of the I./Jagdgeschwader 2 "Richthofen" | 6 October 1940 (Note: According to Scherzer on 25 October 1940.) | — | The head and shoulders of a young man. He wears a military uniform, an Iron Cross displayed at the front of his shirt collar and breast pocket. |
| 9 | Walter Oesau | Hauptmann | Gruppenkommandeur of the III./Jagdgeschwader 3 | 6 February 1941 | Awarded 3rd Swords 15 July 1941 (Note: According to Scherzer on 16 July 1941.) | |
| 11 | Hermann-Friedrich Joppien | Hauptmann | Gruppenkommandeur of the I./Jagdgeschwader 51 | 23 April 1941 | — | |
| 12 | Joachim Müncheberg | Oberleutnant | Staffelkapitän of the 7./Jagdgeschwader 26 "Schlageter" | 7 May 1941 | Awarded 19th Swords 9 September 1942 | |
| 16 | Herbert Ihlefeld | Hauptmann | Gruppenkommandeur of the I./Jagdgeschwader 77 | 27 June 1941 | Awarded 9th Swords 24 April 1942 | |
| 17 | Wilhelm Balthasar | Hauptmann | Geschwaderkommodore of Jagdgeschwader 2 "Richthofen" | 2 July 1941 | — | |
| 18 | Siegfried Schnell | Leutnant (Note: According to Scherzer as Leutnant of the Reserves and Staffelkapitän of the 9./Jagdgeschwader 2 "Richthofen".) | Pilot in the 9./Jagdgeschwader 2 "Richthofen" | 9 July 1941 | — | |
| 27 | Günther Lützow | Major | Geschwaderkommodore of Jagdgeschwader 3 | 20 July 1941 | Awarded 4th Swords 11 October 1941 | |
| 28 | Josef Priller | Oberleutnant | Staffelkapitän of the 1./Jagdgeschwader 26 "Schlageter" | 20 July 1941 | Awarded 73rd Swords 2 July 1944 | |
| 29 | Günther Freiherr von Maltzahn | Major | Geschwaderkommodore of Jagdgeschwader 53 | 24 July 1941 | — | |
| 31 | Heinrich Bär | Leutnant (Note: According to Scherzer as Leutnant of the Reserves.) | Pilot in the 1./Jagdgeschwader 51 | 14 August 1941 | Awarded 7th Swords 16 February 1942 | |
| 32 | Hans Hahn | Hauptmann | Gruppenkommandeur of the III./Jagdgeschwader 2 "Richthofen" | 14 August 1941 | — | |
| 33 | Hans Philipp | Oberleutnant | Staffelkapitän of the 4./Jagdgeschwader 54 | 24 August 1941 | Awarded 8th Swords 12 March 1942 | |
| 35 | Karl-Gottfried Nordmann | Oberleutnant | Staffelkapitän of the 12./Jagdgeschwader 51 | 16 September 1941 | — | |
| 36 | Heinrich Hoffman | Oberfeldwebel | Pilot in the 12./Jagdgeschwader 51 | 19 October 1941* | Killed in action 3 October 1941 | — |
| 38 | Gordon Gollob | Hauptmann | Gruppenkommandeur of the II./Jagdgeschwader 3 | 26 October 1941 (Note: According to Scherzer on 25 October 1941.) | Awarded 13th Swords 23 June 1942; 3rd Diamonds 30 August 1942 | |
| 39 | Erbo Graf von Kageneck | Oberleutnant | Staffelkapitän of the 9./Jagdgeschwader 27 | 26 October 1941 | — | |
| 70 | Rolf Kaldrack | Hauptmann | Gruppenkommandeur of the II./Schnellkampfgeschwader 210 | 9 February 1942* | Killed in action 3 February 1942 | |
| 79 | Gerhard Köppen | Feldwebel | Pilot in the 8./Jagdgeschwader 52 | 27 February 1942 | — | |
| 80 | Kurt Ubben | Hauptmann | Gruppenkommandeur of the III./Jagdgeschwader 77 | 12 March 1942 | — | |
| 81 | Max-Hellmuth Ostermann | Oberleutnant | Staffelkapitän of the 7./Jagdgeschwader 54 | 12 March 1942 | Awarded 10th Swords 17 May 1942 | |
| 82 | Franz Eckerle | Hauptmann | Gruppenkommandeur of the I./Jagdgeschwader 54 | 12 March 1942* | Killed in action 14 February 1942 | |
| 83 | Wolf-Dietrich Huy | Oberleutnant | Staffelkapitän of the 7./Jagdgeschwader 77 | 17 March 1942 | — | |
| 84 | Hans Strelow | Leutnant | Staffelführer of the 5./Jagdgeschwader 51 "Mölders" | 24 March 1942 | — | |
| 85 | Wilhelm Spies | Hauptmann | Gruppenkommandeur of the I./Zerstörergeschwader 26 "Horst Wessel" | 5 April 1942* | Killed in action 27 January 1942 | |
| 90 | Wolfgang Späte | Oberleutnant of the Reserves | Staffelkapitän of the 5./Jagdgeschwader 54 | 23 April 1942 | — | |
| 93 | Hermann Graf | Leutnant of the Reserves | Staffelführer of the 9./Jagdgeschwader 52 | 17 May 1942 | Awarded 11th Swords 19 May 1942; 5th Diamonds 16 September 1942 | |
| 94 | Adolf Dickfeld | Leutnant of the Reserves | Pilot in the 7./Jagdgeschwader 52 | 19 May 1942 (Note: According to Scherzer on 18 May 1942 and not 19 May 1942 as stated by Fellgiebel.) | — | |
| 96 | Leopold Steinbatz | Oberfeldwebel | Pilot in the 9./Jagdgeschwader 52 | 2 June 1942 | Awarded 14th Swords 23 June 1942 | |
| 97 | Hans-Joachim Marseille | Oberleutnant | Pilot in the 3./Jagdgeschwader 27 | 6 June 1942 | Awarded 12th Swords 18 June 1942; 4th Diamonds 3 September 1942 | |
| 98 | Helmut Lent | Major | Gruppenkommandeur of the II./Nachtjagdgeschwader 2 | 6 June 1942 | Awarded 32nd Swords 2 August 1943; 15th Diamonds 31 July 1944 | |
| 101 | Friedrich Geißhardt | Oberleutnant | Pilot and adjutant in the Stab of the I./Jagdgeschwader 77 (Note: According to Scherzer as Staffelkapitän of the 3./Jagdgeschwader 77.) | 23 June 1942 | — | |
| 102 | Heinrich Setz | Oberleutnant | Staffelkapitän of the 4./Jagdgeschwader 77 | 23 June 1942 | — | |
| 106 | Erwin Clausen | Oberleutnant | Staffelkapitän of the 6./Jagdgeschwader 77 | 23 July 1942 | — | |
| 107 | Viktor Bauer | Oberleutnant | Staffelkapitän of the 9./Jagdgeschwader 3 "Udet" | 26 July 1942 | — | |
| 108 | Franz-Josef Beerenbrock | Oberfeldwebel | Pilot in the 10./Jagdgeschwader 51 "Mölders" | 3 August 1942 | — | |
| 109 | Anton Hackl | Hauptmann | Staffelkapitän of the 5./Jagdgeschwader 77 | 9 August 1942 (Note: According to Scherzer on 7 August 1942 and not 9 August 1944 as stated by Fellgiebel.) | Awarded 78th Swords 9 July 1944 (Note: According to Scherzer on 12 July 1944 and not 9 July 1944 as stated by Fellgiebel.) | |
| 114 | Kurt Brändle | Hauptmann | Gruppenkommandeur of the II./Jagdgeschwader 3 "Udet" | 27 August 1942 | — | |
| 115 | Johannes Steinhoff | Hauptmann | Gruppenkommandeur of the II./Jagdgeschwader 52 | 2 September 1942 | Awarded 82nd Swords 28 July 1944 | |
| 122 | Wolf-Dietrich Wilcke | Hauptmann | Geschwaderkommodore of Jagdgeschwader 3 "Udet" | 9 September 1942 | Awarded 23rd Swords 23 December 1942 | |
| 124 | Heinz Schmidt | Leutnant | Pilot in the 4./Jagdgeschwader 52 | 16 September 1942 (Note: According to Scherzer on 15 September 1942.) | — | — |
| 126 | Friedrich-Karl Müller | Oberleutnant | Staffelkapitän of the 1./Jagdgeschwader 53 (Note: Both Fellgiebel and Scherzer state that Friedrich-Karl Müller received the Oak Leaves while serving with 1./Jagdgeschwader 3 (JG 3) "Udet", while Prien states that he was serving with 1./Jagdgeschwader 53 (JG 53). 1./JG 53 seems to be correct based upon the chronicles of JG 53 which details the chain of events leading to the awarding of Oak Leaves just 4 days after the Knight's Cross of the Iron Cross.) | 23 September 1942 | — | — |
| 127 | Wilhelm Crinius | Feldwebel | Pilot in the 3./Jagdgeschwader 53 | 23 September 1942 | — | |
| 128 | Wolfgang Tonne | Oberleutnant | Staffelkapitän of the 3./Jagdgeschwader 53 | 24 September 1942 | — | |
| 130 | Hans Beißwenger | Leutnant (Note: According to Scherzer as Oberleutnant (war officer) and not Leutnant as stated by Fellgiebel.) | Pilot in the 6./Jagdgeschwader 54 | 3 October 1942 | — | — |
| 131 | Ernst-Wilhelm Reinert | Feldwebel | Pilot in the 4./Jagdgeschwader 77 | 7 October 1942 (Note: According to Scherzer on 5 October 1942 and not 7 October 1942 as stated by Fellgiebel.) | Awarded 130th Swords 1 February 1945 | |
| 134 | Günther Rall | Oberleutnant | Staffelkapitän of the 8./Jagdgeschwader 52 | 26 October 1942 | Awarded 34th Swords 12 September 1943 | |
| 137 | Max Stotz | Oberfeldwebel | Pilot in the 5./Jagdgeschwader 54 | 30 October 1942 | — | |
| 139 | Wolfgang Schenck | Hauptmann | Gruppenkommandeur of the I./Zerstörergeschwader 1 | 30 October 1942 | — | |
| 141 | Josef Zwernemann | Oberfeldwebel | Pilot in the 7./Jagdgeschwader 52 | 31 October 1942 | — | |
| 146 | Josef Wurmheller | Leutnant | pilot in the 7./Jagdgeschwader 2 "Richthoffen" | 13 November 1942 | Awarded 108th Swords 24 October 1944 | |
| 175 | Gerhard Barkhorn | Oberleutnant | Staffelkapitän of the 4./Jagdgeschwader 52 | 11 January 1943 | Awarded 52nd Swords 2 March 1944 | |
| 190 | Reinhold Knacke | Hauptmann | Staffelkapitän of the 3./Nachtjagdgeschwader 1 | 7 February 1943* (Note: According to Scherzer on 5 February 1943.) | Killed in action 3 February 1943 | |
| 196 | Paul Gildner | Oberleutnant | Pilot in the 3./Nachtjagdgeschwader 1 (Note: According to Scherzer as pilot in the 4./Nachtjagdgeschwader 1.) | 26 February 1943* | Killed in action 24 February 1943 | |
| 197 | Werner Streib | Major | Gruppenkommandeur of the I./Nachtjagdgeschwader 1 | 26 February 1943 | Awarded 54th Swords 11 March 1944 | |
| 198 | Ludwig Becker | Hauptmann (Note: According to Scherzer as Oberleutnant of the Reserves and Staffelkapitän of the 6./Nachtjagdgeschwader 1.) | Staffelkapitän of the 12./Nachtjagdgeschwader 2 | 26 February 1943* | Killed in action 26 February 1943 | — |
| 232 | Egon Mayer | Hauptmann | Gruppenkommandeur of the III./Jagdgeschwader 2 "Richthofen" | 16 April 1943 | Awarded 51st Swords 2 March 1944 | |
| 255 | Gustav Rödel | Major | Geschwaderkommodore of Jagdgeschwader 27 | 20 June 1943 | — | — |
| 263 | Egmont Prinz zur Lippe-Weißenfeld | Hauptmann | Gruppenkommandeur of the III./Nachtjagdgeschwader 2 | 2 August 1943 | — | |
| 264 | Manfred Meurer | Hauptmann | Staffelkapitän of the 3./Nachtjagdgeschwader 1 | 2 August 1943 | — | — |
| 265 | Heinrich Ehrler | Hauptmann | Gruppenkommandeur of the III./Jagdgeschwader 5 | 2 August 1943 | — | |
| 266 | Theodor Weissenberger | Oberleutnant | Staffelkapitän of the 7./Jagdgeschwader 5 | 2 August 1943 | — | |
| 267 | Joachim Kirschner | Oberleutnant | Staffelkapitän of the 5./Jagdgeschwader 3 "Udet" | 2 August 1943 | — | — |
| 268 | Werner Schröer | Hauptmann | Gruppenkommandeur of the II./Jagdgeschwader 27 | 2 August 1943 | Awarded (144th) Swords 19 April 1945 | |
| 269 | Hajo Herrmann | Major | Geschwaderkommodore of Jagdgeschwader 300 | 2 August 1943 | Awarded 43rd Swords 23 January 1944 | |
| 288 | Hartmann Grasser | Major | Gruppenkommandeur of the II./Jagdgeschwader 51 "Mölders" | 31 August 1943 | — | |
| 289 | Wolf-Udo Ettel | Oberleutnant | Staffelkapitän of the 8./Jagdgeschwader 27 | 31 August 1943* | Killed in action 17 July 1943 | |
| 290 | Heinrich Prinz zu Sayn-Wittgenstein | Hauptmann | Gruppenkommandeur of the I./Nachtjagdgeschwader 100 (Note: According to Scherzer as Gruppenkommandeur of the IV./Nachtjagdgeschwader 5) | 31 August 1943 | Awarded 44th Swords 23 January 1944 | |
| 293 | Walter Nowotny | Oberleutnant | Staffelkapitän of the 1./Jagdgeschwader 54 | 4 September 1943 | Awarded 37th Swords 22 September 1943; 8th Diamonds 19 October 1943 | |
| 337 | Dietrich Hrabak | Oberstleutnant | Geschwaderkommodore of Jagdgeschwader 52 | 25 November 1943 | — | |
| 338 | Wilhelm Lemke | Hauptmann | Gruppenkommandeur of the II./Jagdgeschwader 3 "Udet" (Note: According to Scherzer as Staffelkapitän in the III./Jagdgeschwader 3 "Udet".) | 25 November 1943 | — | — |
| 364 | Horst Hannig | Leutnant | Staffelführer of the 2./Jagdgeschwader 2 "Richthofen" | 3 January 1944* | Killed in action 15 May 1943 | — |
| 365 | Hans-Arnold Stahlschmidt | Leutnant | Staffelführer of the 2./Jagdgeschwader 27 | 3 January 1944* | Missing in action 7 September 1942 | — |
| 413 | Kurt Bühlingen | Major | Gruppenkommandeur of the II./Jagdgeschwader 2 "Richthofen" | 2 March 1944 | Awarded 88th Swords 14 August 1944 | |
| 414 | Horst Ademeit | Hauptmann | Gruppenkommandeur of the I./Jagdgeschwader 54 | 2 March 1944 | — | |
| 415 | Walter Krupinski | Oberleutnant | Staffelkapitän of the 7./Jagdgeschwader 52 | 2 March 1944 | — | |
| 416 | August Geiger | Hauptmann | Gruppenkommandeur of the III./Nachtjagdgeschwader 1 | 2 March 1944* | Killed in action 29 September 1943 | — |
| 417 | Hans-Dieter Frank | Hauptmann | Gruppenkommandeur of the I./Nachtjagdgeschwader 1 | 2 March 1944* | Killed in action 27 September 1943 | — |
| 418 | Johannes Wiese | Major | Gruppenkommandeur of the I./Jagdgeschwader 52 | 2 March 1944 | — | — |
| 419 | Reinhard Seiler | Major | Gruppenkommandeur of the I./Jagdgeschwader 54 | 2 March 1944 | — | |
| 420 | Erich Hartmann | Leutnant | Staffelführer of the 9./Jagdgeschwader 52 (Note: According to Scherzer as Staffelkapitän of the 9./Jagdgeschwader 52.) | 2 March 1944 | Awarded 75th Swords 2 July 1944; 18th Diamonds 25 August 1944 | |
| 430 | Hans-Joachim Jabs | Hauptmann | Gruppenkommandeur of the IV./Nachtjagdgeschwader 1 | 24 March 1944 | — | |
| 437 | Eduard Tratt | Hauptmann | Gruppenkommandeur of the II./Zerstörergeschwader 26 | 26 March 1944* | Killed in action 22 February 1944 | — |
| 444 | Günther Radusch | Oberstleutnant (Note: According to Scherzer as Major and not Oberstleutnant.) | Geschwaderkommodore of Nachtjagdgeschwader 5 | 6 April 1944 | — | — |
| 446 | Alfred Grislawski | Hauptmann | Staffelkapitän of the 1./Jagdgeschwader 1 | 11 April 1944 | — | — |
| 447 | Erich Rudorffer | Major (Note: According to Scherzer as Hauptmann and not as Major.) | Gruppenkommandeur of the II./Jagdgeschwader 54 | 11 April 1944 | Awarded 126th Swords 26 January 1945 | |
| 448 | Emil Lang | Oberleutnant | Staffelkapitän of the 9./Jagdgeschwader 54 | 11 April 1944 | Killed in action 3 September 1944 | — |
| 449 | Otto Kittel | Leutnant | Pilot in the 1./Jagdgeschwader 54 | 11 April 1944 | Awarded 113th Swords 25 November 1944 | — |
| 450 | Rudolf Schoenert | Major of the Reserves | Commander of Nachtjagdgruppe 10 | 11 April 1944 | — | — |
| 451 | Wilhelm Herget | Major (Note: According to Scherzer as Major of the Reserves.) | Gruppenkommandeur of the I./Nachtjagdgeschwader 4 | 11 April 1944 | — | — |
| 452 | Anton Hafner | Leutnant | Pilot in the 6./Jagdgeschwader 51 "Mölders" | 11 April 1944 | — | — |
| 460 | Günther Schack | Leutnant | Staffelkapitän of the 9./Jagdgeschwader 51 "Mölders" | 20 April 1944 | — | — |
| 464 | Albin Wolf | Leutnant | Pilot in the 6./Jagdgeschwader 54 | 27 April 1944* (Note: According to Scherzer on 25 April 1944.) | Killed in action 2 April 1944 | — |
| 465 | Heinz Vinke | Oberfeldwebel | Pilot in the 11./Nachtjagdgeschwader 1 | 27 April 1944* | Missing in action 26 February 1944 | Smiling man wearing life jacket and a military decoration in shape of an Iron Cross at his neck. |
| 471 | Leopold Münster | Leutnant | Staffelkapitän in the 4./Jagdgeschwader 3 "Udet" (Note: According to Scherzer as Staffelkapitän of the 5./Jagdgeschwader 3 "Udet".) | 12 May 1944* | Killed in action 8 May 1944 | |
| 507 | Heinz-Wolfgang Schnaufer | Hauptmann | Gruppenkommandeur of the IV./Nachtjagdgeschwader 1 | 24 June 1944 | Awarded 84th Swords 30 July 1944; 21st Diamonds 16 October 1944 (Note: According to Scherzer the Swords to the Knight's Cross of the Iron Cross with Oak Leaves were awarded on 3 August 1944.) | |
| 508 | Adolf Glunz | Leutnant | Pilot in the 6./Jagdgeschwader 26 "Schlageter" | 24 June 1944 | — | |
| 512 | Herbert Huppertz | Hauptmann | Gruppenkommandeur of the III./Jagdgeschwader 2 "Richthofen" | 24 June 1944* | Killed in action 8 June 1944 | |
| 526 | Wilhelm Batz | Hauptmann | Gruppenkommandeur of the III./Jagdgeschwader 52 (Note: According to Scherzer as leader of the III./Jagdgeschwader 52.) | 20 July 1944 | Awarded (145th) Swords 21 April 1945 | — |
| 527 | Willy Kientsch | Oberleutnant | Staffelkapitän of the 6./Jagdgeschwader 27 | 20 July 1944* | Killed in action 29 January 1944 | — |
| 528 | Heinz Strüning | Hauptmann of the Reserves (Note: According to Scherzer as Hauptmann (war officer).) | Staffelkapitän of the 3./Nachtjagdgeschwader 1 | 20 July 1944 | — | |
| 529 | Karl-Heinz Weber | Hauptmann | Staffelkapitän of the 7./Jagdgeschwader 51 "Mölders" | 20 July 1944* | Missing in action 7 June 1944 | — |
| 530 | Otto Weßling | Oberleutnant | Staffelkapitän of the 11./Jagdgeschwader 3 "Udet" | 20 July 1944* | Killed in action 19 April 1944 | — |
| 531 | Rudolf Frank | Oberfeldwebel | Pilot in the 2./Nachtjagdgeschwader 3 | 20 July 1944* | Killed in action 26 April 1944 | — |
| 588 | Paul Zorner | Hauptmann | Gruppenkommandeur of the III./Nachtjagdgeschwader 5 | 17 September 1944 | — | — |
| 616 | Walter Schuck | Leutnant | Pilot in the 9./Jagdgeschwader 5 | 30 September 1944 | — | — |
| 653 | Klaus Mietusch | Major | Gruppenkommandeur of the III./Jagdgeschwader 26 "Schlageter" | 18 November 1944* | Killed in action 17 September 1944 | |
| 663 | Georg-Peter Eder | Hauptmann | Staffelkapitän of the 6./Jagdgeschwader 1 | 25 November 1944 | — | — |
| 667 | Gerhard Michalski | Major | Geschwaderkommodore of Jagdgeschwader 4 | 25 November 1944 | — | — |
| 697 | Joachim Brendel | Hauptmann | Gruppenkommandeur of the III./Jagdgeschwader 51 "Mölders" | 14 January 1945 | — | — |
| 713 | Herbert Rollwage | Leutnant | Staffelkapitän of the 5./Jagdgeschwader 53 | 24 January 1945 | — | — |
| 724 | Walther Dahl | Major | Geschwaderkommodore of Jagdgeschwader 300 | 1 February 1945 | At the same time promoted to Oberstleutnant | — |
| 727 | Jürgen Harder | Major | Geschwaderkommodore of Jagdgeschwader 11 | 1 February 1945 | — | — |
| 736 | Herbert Schramm | Oberleutnant | Staffelkapitän of the 5./Jagdgeschwader 27 | 11 February 1945* | Killed in action 1 December 1943 | — |
| 748 | Rolf Hermichen | Major | Gruppenkommandeur of the I./Jagdgeschwader 11 | 19 February 1945 | — | — |
| 769 | Kurt Welter | Oberleutnant | Staffelkapitän of the 10./Nachtjagdgeschwader 11 | 11 March 1945 | — | — |
| 781 | Heinz Rökker | Hauptmann | Staffelkapitän of the 2./Nachtjagdgeschwader 2 | 12 March 1945 | — | — |
| 782 | Robert Weiß | Hauptmann | Gruppenkommandeur of the III./Jagdgeschwader 54 | 12 March 1945* | Killed in action 29 December 1944 | |
| 792 | Martin Becker | Hauptmann (Note: According to Scherzer as Hauptmann of the Reserves.) | Gruppenkommandeur of the IV./Nachtjagdgeschwader 6 | 20 March 1945 | — | — |
| 810 | Günther Josten | Oberleutnant | Staffelkapitän of the 3./Jagdgeschwader 51 "Mölders" | 28 March 1945 | — | — |
| 822 | Gerhard Thyben | Oberleutnant | Staffelkapitän of the 7./Jagdgeschwader 54 | 8 April 1945 | — | |
| 833 | Gerhard Raht | Hauptmann | Gruppenkommandeur of the I./Nachtjagdgeschwader 2 | 15 April 1945 | — | — |
| 836 | Herbert Lütje | Major | Geschwaderkommodore of Nachtjagdgeschwader 6 | 17 April 1945 | — | |
| 837 | Helmut Lipfert | Hauptmann | Gruppenkommandeur of the I./Jagdgeschwader 53 | 17 April 1945 | — | — |
| 838 | Josef Kraft | Hauptmann | Staffelkapitän of the 12./Nachtjagdgeschwader 1 | 17 April 1945 | — | — |
| 839 | Martin Drewes | Major | Gruppenkommandeur of the III./Nachtjagdgeschwader 1 | 17 April 1945 | — | |
| 840 | Hermann Greiner | Hauptmann | Gruppenkommandeur of the IV./Nachtjagdgeschwader 1 | 17 April 1945 | — | — |
| 841 | Paul Semrau | Major | Gruppenkommandeur of the I./Nachtjagdgeschwader 2 | 17 April 1945* | Killed in action 8 February 1945 | |
