= Jagdgeschwader 400 =

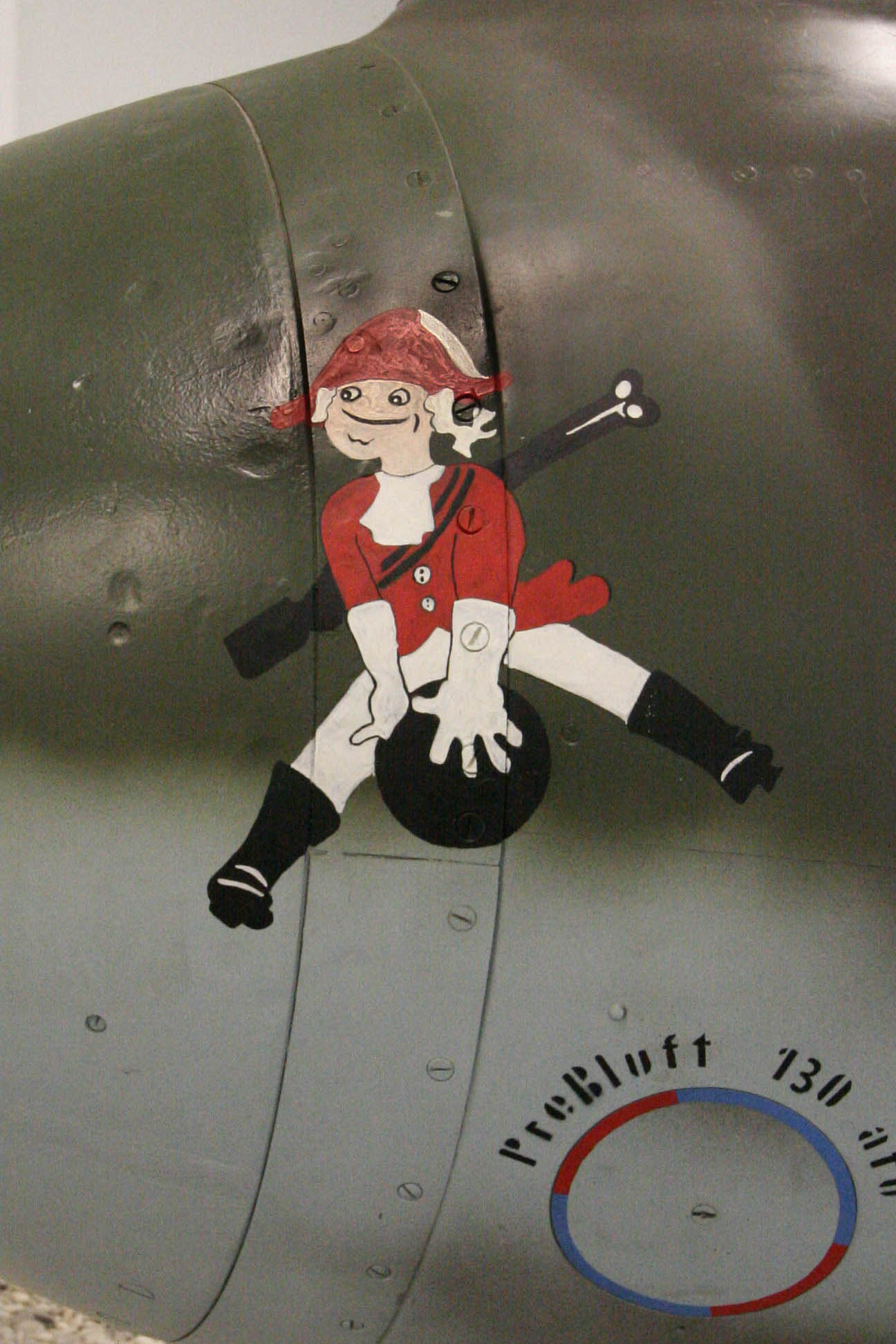
- JG 400 Emblem: Baron Munchausen's cannonball ride
- Active: 1944–45
- Country: Nazi Germany
- Branch: Luftwaffe
- Type: Fighter Aircraft
- Role: Air superiority
- Size: Air Force Wing

Commanders
- Notable commanders: Wolfgang Späte

Aircraft flown
- Fighter: Me 163

Jagdgeschwader 400 (JG 400) was a Luftwaffe fighter-wing of World War II. JG 400 was formed on 1 February 1944 in Brandis with Stab only for the Messerschmitt Me 163 rocket fighter, as the only military aviation unit of any size in history, to actively use rocket-powered combat aircraft in wartime.

Major Wolfgang Späte, of JG 54 was transferred into the experimental flying unit Erprobungskommando 16 at Bad Zwischenahn in Northern Germany, where the Messerschmitt Me 163 Komet was under development and tactical testing.

Once the Me 163B was declared operational in July 1944, Späte was given command of the formally raised JG 400, ultimately the only front-line unit to use the Me 163 operationally.

Due to the meteoric rate of climb and limited endurance of the Komet, the Luftwaffe intended to locate individual Staffeln of Komets at strategic points in Germany to intercept Allied bomber formations en route to targets. JG 400 was initially based at Venlo, Netherlands, before moving to Brandis near Leipzig, Germany.

== Operational history ==
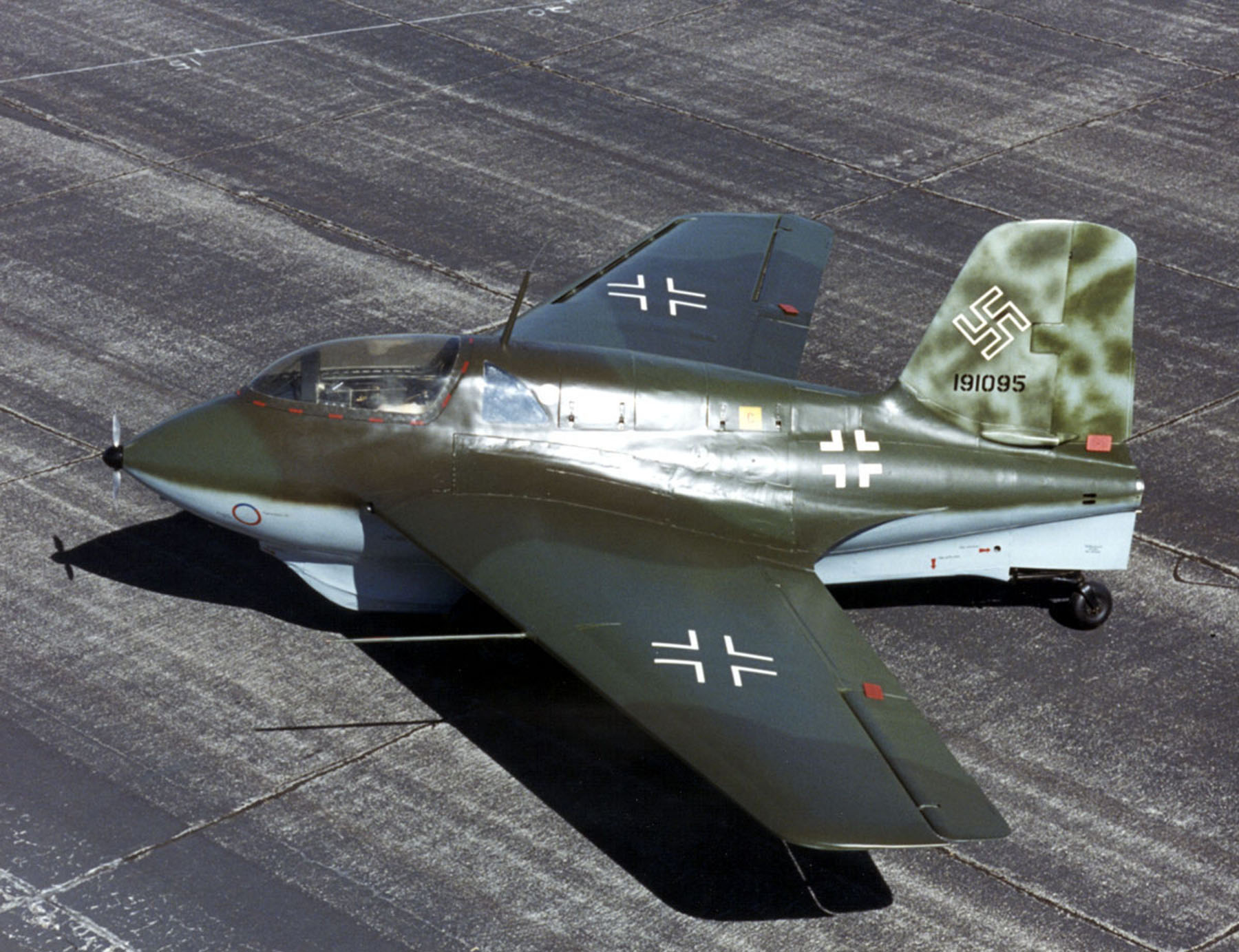
Me 163B

The Me 163B-1a fighters first flew operationally on 6 August 1944, two Me 163s reportedly claiming three North American P-51 Mustangs of the 352nd Fighter Group. JG 400 intercepted formations of Boeing B-17 Flying Fortress bombers for the first time on 16 August 1944. Leutnant Hartmut Ryll engaged the B-17s but was shot down and killed by two P-51s of the 359th Fighter Group.

On 24 August 1944, several B-17s were attacked, with Fw. Siegfred Schubert claiming two B-17s downed (another was claimed by other pilots). His wingman also downed a B-17. One Komet was shot down by bomber gunners.

On 11 September seven aircraft attacked a United States Army Air Forces (USAAF) bomber formation, and three B-17s were claimed shot down. On 7 October two B-17s were claimed, but two more Komets were lost. By 24 September JG 400 had eleven serviceable Me 163s available, but was short of competent pilots to fly them. The Komets flew operationally on five days during the month, but the highest number of rocket fighters involved was on 28 September, when nine were committed. During the same month the two main factories producing the volatile propellants were seriously damaged in bombing raids, and the resulting shortage of propellants would hamper JG 400 for the rest of the war.

Tactics were soon developed; typically to zoom through the bomber formations up to an altitude of 40,000 feet (12,000 m), and then to power-dive down through the formation again. This theoretically gave the pilot two chances to aim and fire a few bursts of 30mm cannon fire before gliding back towards the home airfield.

Allied fighter formations countered the Komet in several ways; the extremely short endurance was soon noted, and once in a glide the Komet was highly vulnerable to any escort fighter. Brandis was quickly identified as JG 400's home airfield and strafing attacks curtailed operations.

Many other tactical issues faced the JG 400 pilots apart from the inherent chemical instability of the aircraft's propulsion system and its hypergolic fuel/oxidizer combination. It was found very difficult to aim and fire the guns accurately at such high approach speeds. A number of solutions were tried out, the most innovative being fitting a battery of eight 50mm mortars, firing upwards. The mortars were fired by a signal from a photocell in the upper surface of the aircraft. When the Komet flew under the bomber, the shadow of the aircraft above triggered the photocell and the mortar rounds were fired. Research suggests this arrangement was only used once in combat, reportedly destroying a Royal Air Force (RAF) Handley Page Halifax bomber.

Although over 300 Me 163s were produced (including a few Me 163Cs with increased fuel), only 9 confirmed air victories were credited to JG 400 by the end of the war, for 14 Komets lost from all causes (mainly crashes and accidents).

I./JG 400 was disbanded at Brandis in April 1945, while II. Gruppe disbanded at Husum.

== Commanding officer ==
- Major Wolfgang Späte, 1 February 1944 – March 1945
