= Rudolf Klemm =

German World War II fighter pilot

- Born: 10 February 1918; Haltingen
- Died: 5 July 1989 (aged 71); Germany
- Military career
- Allegiance: Nazi Germany
- Branch: Luftwaffe
- Service years: 1937–1945
- Rank: Major
- Units: JG 54, JG 26
- Commands: 7./JG 54, 12./JG 54, 15./JG 54; III./JG 54, IV./JG 54, IV./JG 26
- Conflicts: World War II: Siege of Leningrad; Defense of the Reich
- Awards: Knight's Cross of the Iron Cross

Rudolf Klemm (10 February 1918 – 5 July 1989) was a German Luftwaffe ace and recipient of the Knight's Cross of the Iron Cross during World War II. The Knight's Cross of the Iron Cross, and its variants were the highest awards in the military and paramilitary forces of Nazi Germany during World War II. During his career, he was credited with 42 aerial victories in 293 missions. Klemm's plane was shot down 4 times and he saved his life twice by parachuting and twice with an emergency landing.

After the war, Klemm was an instructor in his own flying school for small aircraft based on the airport of Basel-Mulhouse until his plane crashed mysteriously, when he was on training with a trainee pilot.

== Early life and career ==
Klemm was born on 10 February 1918 in Haltingen, now part of Weil am Rhein, then in the Grand Duchy of Baden within the German Empire. He joined the military service of the Luftwaffe in 1937. Following completion of flight and fighter pilot training, (Note: Flight training in the Luftwaffe progressed through the levels A1, A2 and B1, B2, referred to as A/B flight training. A training included theoretical and practical training in aerobatics, navigation, long-distance flights and dead-stick landings. The B courses included high-altitude flights, instrument flights, night landings and training to handle the aircraft in difficult situations.) Klemm served as a flight instructor before he was transferred to 8. Staffel (8th squadron) of Jagdgeschwader 54 (JG 54—54th Fighter Wing) in December 1941. His Staffel was subordinated to III. Gruppe (3rd group) headed by Hauptmann Reinhard Seiler.

== World War II ==
World War II in Europe had begun on Friday, 1 September 1939, when German forces invaded Poland. In late 1941, III. Gruppe was based at Siverskaya, located approximately 70 kilometers (43 miles) south of Leningrad on the Eastern Front.

On 4 April 1942, Klemm was credited with JG 54s 2,000th aerial victory.

=== Defense of the Reich ===
In mid-February 1943, III. Gruppe of JG 54 was withdrawn from the Eastern Front and ordered to Vendeville, France where it was subordinated to the Geschwaderstab (headquarters unit) of Jagdgeschwader 26 "Schlageter" (JG 26—26th Fighter Wing). The Gruppe was equipped with the Messerschmitt Bf 109 G-4 armed with 20 mm MG 151/20 cannons installed in conformal gun pods under the wings. The original plan was to exchange JG 26 which had been fighting on the Western Front with JG 54. The plan was cancelled in March. Instead of III. Gruppe of JG 54 returning to the Eastern Front, the Gruppe was ordered to Bad Zwischenahn on 25 March and then to Oldenburg Airfield two days later. Here, the Gruppe was subordinated to the 2. Jagd-Division (2nd Fighter Division) which was fighting in defense of the Reich.

On 17 April, III. Gruppe flew its first combat mission in defense of the Reich. That day, the United States Army Air Forces (USAAF) VIII Bomber Command, later renamed to Eighth Air Force, attacked the Focke-Wulf factory in Bremen. The Gruppe was scrambled at 12:29. At 12:40 approximately 120 to 150 Boeing B-17 Flying Fortress bombers were encountered west of Wilhelmshaven. Due to evasive maneuvering of the bombers and the heavy defensive gunfire, the Gruppe initially failed to attack the bombers head-on. At 13:00, III. Gruppe made their first head-on attack while the leading bombers of the 91st and 306th Bombardment Group made their bomb-run. The Gruppe kept pursuing the bombers and claimed four further bombers shot down, one of which was not confirmed and one was credited to Klemm, his first heavy bomber.

On 14 May, the USAAF VIII Bomber Command attacked the harbor and ship building at Kiel. III. Gruppe was scrambled at 11:29 and shortly after 12:00 intercepted 125 Consolidated B-24 Liberator bombers of the 44th Bombardment Group after they had dropped their bombs over the target area. In this encounter, III. Gruppe pilots claimed three B-24 bombers shot down, including one by Klemm. He was then shot down and wounded by friendly fire. His Bf 109 G-4 (Werknummer 16144—factory number) was hit by German anti-aircraft artillery in a location approximately 10 kilometers (6.2 miles) west of Kiel. Blinded in one eye, he returned to operations weeks later.

In February 1944, Klemm was appointed Staffelkapitän (squadron leader) of 7. Staffel of JG 54, succeeding Oberleutnant Waldemar Wübke. On 9 April, he was wounded in combat when his Bf 109 G-6 (Werknummer 15573) was shot down near Kiel, forcing him to bail out.

Klemm was transferred and appointed Staffelkapitän of 12. Staffel of JG 54 on 5 June. The Staffel was redesignated on 20 August and became the 15. Staffel. On 16 October, he was appointed Gruppenkommandeur (group commander) of IV. Gruppe of JG 54. He succeeded Major Wolfgang Späte who was transferred. Consquently, command of 15. Staffel was passed on to Leutnant Karl Brill. On 18 November, Klemm was awarded the Knight's Cross of the Iron Cross (Ritterkreuz des Eisernen Kreuzes) for 40 aerial victories claimed.

On 15 February 1945, Klemm became the last Gruppenkommandeur of III. Gruppe of JG 54. On 8 May, Klemm surrendered the Gruppe to Allied forces at Süderhastedt in northern Germany.

== Summary of career ==
=== Aerial victory claims ===
According to Obermaier, Klemm was credited with 42 aerial victories claimed in 293 combat missions. He claimed at least 21 aerial victories over the Western Allies, including 16 heavy bombers. Mathews and Foreman, authors of Luftwaffe Aces — Biographies and Victory Claims, researched the German Federal Archives and found records for 43 aerial victory claims. This figure includes 29 aerial victories on the Eastern Front and 14 over the Western Allies, including ten heavy bombers.

Victory claims were logged to a map-reference (PQ = Planquadrat), for example "PQ 29773". The Luftwaffe grid map (Jägermeldenetz) covered all of Europe, western Russia and North Africa and was composed of rectangles measuring 15 minutes of latitude by 30 minutes of longitude, an area of about 360 square miles (930 km^{2}). These sectors were then subdivided into 36 smaller units to give a location area 3 km × 4 km (1.9 mi × 2.5 mi) in size.

Chronicle of aerial victories
This and the ♠ (Ace of spades) indicates those aerial victories which made Klemm an "ace-in-a-day", a term which designates a fighter pilot who has shot down five or more airplanes in a single day. This and the – (dash) indicates unconfirmed aerial victory claims for which Klemm did not receive credit. This along with the * (asterisk) indicates an Herausschuss (separation shot)—a severely damaged heavy bomber forced to separate from his combat box which was counted as an aerial victory. This and the ? (question mark) indicates information discrepancies listed by Caldwell, Prien, Balke, Stemmer, Rodeike, Bock, Mathews and Foreman.
Claim	Date	Time	Type	Location	Unit	Claim	Date	Time	Type	Location	Unit
– Claims with III. Gruppe of Jagdgeschwader 54 – Eastern Front — 6 December 1941 – 30 April 1942
1	7 February 1942	11:35	R-Z? (Note: According to Mathews and Foreman claimed at Polikarpov R-5.)		8./JG 54	2	4 April 1942	10:42	Pe-2	vicinity of Leningrad	8./JG 54
– Claims with III. Gruppe of Jagdgeschwader 54 – Eastern Front — 1 May 1942 – 3 February 1943
3	11 August 1942	15:40	LaGG-3	PQ 29773; 40 km (25 mi) east-northeast of Staraya Russa	8./JG 54	14	7 November 1942	13:52	Il-2? (Note: According to Mathews and Foreman claimed as a Mikoyan-Gurevich MiG-3.)	PQ 28263; 20 km (12 mi) southwest of Valday	8./JG 54
4	1 September 1942	08:43	LaGG-3	PQ 10112 vicinity of Shlisselburg	8./JG 54	15	7 November 1942	14:00	LaGG-3? (Note: According to Mathews and Foreman claimed as a Ilyushin Il-2.)	PQ 38141; 15 km (9.3 mi) southwest of Valday	8./JG 54
5	10 September 1942	13:27	LaGG-3	PQ 00263, north of Dubrowka; 10 km (6.2 mi) southwest of Shlisselburg	8./JG 54	16	30 December 1942	12:08	LaGG-3	PQ 07683, Michalk; 15 km (9.3 mi) east-southeast of Velikiye Luki	9./JG 54
6	12 September 1942	08:42	LaGG-3	PQ 10134 east of Shlisselburg	8./JG 54	17	4 January 1943	13:25	Il-2	PQ 07731; 15 km (9.3 mi) south of Velikiye Luki	9./JG 54
7	21 September 1942	09:43	I-16	PQ 11741; 20 km (12 mi) north of Shlisselburg	8./JG 54	18	5 January 1943	08:40	Il-2	PQ 07584; 15 km (9.3 mi) southwest of Velikiye Luki	9./JG 54
8♠	29 September 1942	14:55	MiG-3	PQ 00261; 10 km (6.2 mi) southwest of Shlisselburg	8./JG 54	19	12 January 1943	13:05	Il-2	PQ 07652; 10 km (6.2 mi) east of Velikiye Luki	9./JG 54
9♠	29 September 1942	15:04	I-16	PQ 00263, Nowy Poselok; 10 km (6.2 mi) southwest of Shlisselburg	8./JG 54	20	12 January 1943	13:09	Il-2	PQ 07572; 40 km (25 mi) west of Toropa	9./JG 54
10♠	29 September 1942	15:09	I-16	PQ 00251, Oserki; 15 km (9.3 mi) east-northeast of Shlisselburg	8./JG 54	21	14 January 1943	12:25	MiG-3	PQ 07594; 10 km (6.2 mi) southwest of Velikiye Luki	9./JG 54
11♠	29 September 1942	15:09	I-16	PQ 00251, Oserki; 15 km (9.3 mi) east-northeast of Shlisselburg	8./JG 54	22	15 January 1943	11:30	Pe-2	PQ 17513; 25 km (16 mi) southwest of Toropets	9./JG 54
12♠	29 September 1942	15:10	I-16	PQ 00252; 15 km (9.3 mi) east-northeast of Shlisselburg	8./JG 54	23	18 January 1943	07:55	DB-3	PQ 07772; 10 km (6.2 mi) east of Nevel	9./JG 54
13	30 September 1942	15:34	MiG-3	PQ 00242; 20 km (12 mi) southeast of Leningrad	8./JG 54						
– Claims with III. Gruppe of Jagdgeschwader 54 – Defense of the Reich — 27 March 1943 – January 1944
24	17 April 1943	13:21	B-17	15 km (9.3 mi) southwest of Ahlhorn	8./JG 54	26	9 October 1943	12:00	B-17	PQ 05 Ost S/BS-7/1, 4 Neubrandenburg	7./JG 54
25	14 May 1943	12:10? (Note: According to Mathews and Foreman claimed at 12:08.)	B-24	Borby, Eckernförde Bay; Rieseby	8./JG 54	27? (Note: This claim is not listed by Mathews and Foreman.)	5 January 1944	12:05	P-38		8./JG 54
? (Note: This claim is not listed by Prien, Balke, Stemmer, Rodeike and Bock.)	9 October 1943	11:30	B-17	Neubrandenburg	7./JG 54	28?	11 January 1944	12:05	B-17		7./JG 54
– Claims with III. Gruppe of Jagdgeschwader 54 – Defense of the Reich — February – 9 April 1944
29	20 February 1944	12:45	B-17	PQ 05 Ost GT	7./JG 54	?	8 April 1944	13:44	B-24	14 km (8.7 mi) north Celle	7./JG 54
30	22 February 1944	13:45	B-17*	PQ 05 Ost HT 4-2 east of Detmold	7./JG 54	?	8 April 1944	13:53	B-24	southwest of Twistringen	7./JG 54
31	6 March 1944	12:07	B-17*	PQ 05 Ost EQ 9-7; Loningen	7./JG 54	33?	8 April 1944	13:55	B-24	PQ 15 Ost EA 7	7./JG 54
32	6 March 1944	14:28	B-17	PQ 05 Ost EQ; Sögel-Cloppenburg	7./JG 54	34?	8 April 1944	16:25	P-38	PQ 05 Ost ES 7	7./JG 54
– Claims with IV. Gruppe of Jagdgeschwader 54 – Eastern Front — 5 June – 14 September 1944
35	15 July 1944	14:33	P-39	PQ 26 Ost 50177 central Gulf of Finland	12./JG 54	38	6 August 1944	14:55	Yak-9	PQ 25 Ost 12363; 25 km (16 mi) west-northwest of Dęblin	12./JG 54
36	20 July 1944	18:58	Yak-9	PQ 25 Ost 32813; 10 km (6.2 mi) northeast of Chełm	12./JG 54	39	27 August 1944	16:14	Yak-9	PQ 25 Ost 13235; 20 km (12 mi) north of Ostrov	15./JG 54
37	5 August 1944	16:28	Yak-9	PQ 25 Ost 12188; 25 km (16 mi) east-southeast of Grojec	12./JG 54	40	1 September 1944	14:04	Yak-11	PQ 25 Ost 13527; 25 km (16 mi) north-northeast of Warsaw	15./JG 54
– Claims with IV. Gruppe of Jagdgeschwader 54 – Defense of the Reich — 15 September – 31 December 1944
41	26 September 1944	14:16	P-47	PQ 05 Ost JN-1/3; Doetinchem	15./JG 54	43	18 December 1944	10:42	P-47	PQ S/PO-5 west of Adenau	Stab IV./JG 54
42	18 December 1944	10:30	P-47	PQ 05 Ost S/PN-5, east-southeast Malmedy south of Büllingen	Stab IV./JG 54						
– Claims with IV. Gruppe of Jagdgeschwader 26 "Schlageter" – Defense of the Reich — 15 September – 31 December 1944
— (Note: According to Mathews and Foreman this claim was confirmed.)	19 March 1945	13:35	P-51	10 km (6.2 mi) northwest of Nordhorn	Stab IV./JG 26						

=== Awards ===
- Iron Cross (1939) 2nd and 1st Class
- Honor Goblet of the Luftwaffe on 1 March 1943 as Leutnant and pilot (Note: According to Obermaier on 22 February 1943.)
- German Cross in Gold on 24 February 1944 as Oberleutnant in the III./Jagdgeschwader 54
- Knight's Cross of the Iron Cross on 18 November 1944 as Hauptmann and Staffelkapitän in the 10./Jagdgeschwader 54 (Note: According to Scherzer as Staffelkapitän in the IV./Jagdgeschwader 54.)

== Notes ==
Military offices
Preceded by Oberleutnant Rudolf Patzak	Acting Commander of III. Gruppe of Jagdgeschwader 54; February 1944–March 1944	Succeeded by Hauptmann Rudolf Sinner
Preceded by Oberleutnant Wilhelm Heilmann	Commander of III. Jagdgeschwader 54; January 1945–February 1945	Succeeded by Absorbed into IV. JG 26
Preceded by Previously III. JG 54	Commander of IV. Jagdgeschwader 26; 25 February 1945–April 1945	Succeeded by None
