= Max-Hellmuth Ostermann =

German World War II flying ace (1917–1942)

- Ostermann as an Oberleutnant
- Born: 11 December 1917; Hamburg, German Empire
- Died: 9 August 1942 (aged 24) near Lake Ilmen, Leningrad Oblast, Soviet Union
- Cause of death: Killed in action
- Military career
- Allegiance: Nazi Germany
- Branch: Luftwaffe
- Service years: 1937–1942
- Rank: Oberleutnant (first lieutenant)
- Unit: ZG 1, JG 21, JG 54
- Commands: 7./JG 54
- Conflicts: See battles World War II: Invasion of Poland; Battle of France; Battle of Britain; Balkans Campaign; Operation Barbarossa; Eastern Front †
- Awards: Knight's Cross of the Iron Cross with Oak Leaves and Swords

Max-Hellmuth Ostermann (11 December 1917 – 9 August 1942) was a Luftwaffe fighter ace during World War II. A flying ace or fighter ace is a military aviator credited with shooting down five or more enemy aircraft during aerial combat. He is credited with 102 enemy aircraft shot down claimed in over 300 combat missions. The majority of his victories were claimed over the Eastern Front with eight claims over the Western Front and one over Belgrade. Ostermann was of such short height that wooden blocks had to be attached to his rudder pedals for him to engage in tight turning aerial combat.

Born in Hamburg, Ostermann joined the military service of the Luftwaffe in 1937 and was trained as a pilot. After a brief period with Zerstörergeschwader 1 (ZG 1), a heavy fighter unit, he was transferred to Jagdgeschwader 54 (JG 54). He participated in the Battle of France and Britain before transferring east. He became the sixth fighter pilot in aviation history to achieve 100 aerial victories on the Eastern Front for which he was awarded Knight's Cross of the Iron Cross with Oak Leaves and Swords. He was killed in aerial combat with Soviet fighters southeast of Lake Ilmen on 9 August 1942.

== Early life and career ==
Max-Hellmuth Ostermann was born on 11 December 1917 in Hamburg. His father was a civil servant in the justice department. Ostermann joined the Luftwaffe as a Fahnenjunker (Officer Cadet) in March 1937 after he had received his Abitur (diploma)—the final exams that pupils take at the end of their secondary education. His first assignment was with I. Gruppe (1st group) Zerstörergeschwader 1 (ZG 1) flying the Messerschmitt Bf 110 and participated in the Invasion of Poland in 1939. (Note: For an explanation of Luftwaffe unit designations see Organisation of the Luftwaffe during World War II.) In January 1940 Hauptmann (Captain) Wolfgang Falck took command of I./ZG 1. Falck came to the opinion that the Bf 110 was just a little too big for Ostermann and had him transferred to the Messerschmitt Bf 109 equipped I./Jagdgeschwader 21 (JG 21) on 7 April 1940. JG 21 at the time was based at Mönchengladbach and was subordinated to Oberstleutnant (Lieutenant Colonel) Max Ibel, the Geschwaderkommodore (Wing Commander) of Jagdgeschwader 27.

He claimed his first of two aerial victories in the Battle of France on 20 May 1940. Ostermann was appointed the commander of a Rotte, an element of two aircraft, with Unteroffizier (non-commissioned officer) Fritz Marcks as his wingman. The Schwarm (flight) led by Oberleutnant (Senior Lieutenant or First Lieutenant) Günther Scholz engaged eight French Morane-Saulnier M.S.406's fighters near Amiens with Ostermann, Marcks and Scholz claiming one each. His second aerial victory was achieved over a Curtiss Hawk-75 on 26 May 1940. In a head on firing pass two 20mm shells tore off large parts of the aircraft's tail fin, which then collided with Osterrmann's starboard wing. The French pilot was observed to bail out with Ostermann managing to make a safe landing.

By the time I./JG 21 was ordered to the coastal area of the English Channel the Gruppe was redesignated III./Jagdgeschwader 54 (JG 54). Ostermann's third aerial victory on 12 August 1940 may have been over Flight Lieutenant E.B.B. Smith of No. 610 Squadron RAF, who bailed out of his Supermarine Spitfire I K9818. Smith was rescued from the Channel and hospitalized. On 8 October 1940 Ostermann claimed his 7th aerial victory of the war and 5th of the Battle of Britain. His opponent may have been the Czech Sergeant Josef František who was killed flying Hurricane Mk. I R4175 from No. 303 Polish Fighter Squadron near Sutton, west of Croydon, in the southern outskirts of London that day. The reason for his fatal crash remains unclear. Apart from Ostermann's claim, Leutnant (Second Lieutenant) Max Clerico and Feldwebel (Sergeant) Fritz Oeltjens also claimed one aircraft each at the same time and in the same vicinity. On 5 September 1940, III./JG 54's Gruppenkommandeur (group commander) failed to return from a mission and Geschwaderkommodore Hannes Trautloft temporarily appointed Oberleutnant Günther Scholz to lead the Gruppe. The leadership of 7. Staffel (7th squadron) was filled by Oberleutnant Hans-Ekkehard Bob, who became one of Ostermann's mentors. During an escort mission on 30 September 1940, Bob and Ostermann claimed one Spitfire shot down each. In return Ostermann's wingman was shot down and made a forced landing at Bexhill. He radioed his fellow pilots: "Spinat vier meldet sich ab nach Kanada—Spinach 4 reports off for Canada".

His aerial victory on 20 October 1940 over a No. 74 Squadron RAF Spitfire was his sixth—his eight overall—victory over Royal Air Force (RAF) fighters and his last during the Battle of Britain. The following day III./JG 54 was instructed to relocate. Five month later following a long combat pause, JG 54 was moved to the south-east to counter the pro-British coup d'état in Belgrade, Yugoslavia. He claimed his ninth victory over a Yugoslav Royal Air Force Messerschmitt Bf 109 E-3, piloted by Karel Štrbenk who was killed, on 6 April 1941 over Belgrade during the Balkans Campaign. On 20 April, III./JG 54 was withdrawn from combat operations, relocating to Stolp-Reitz for conversion training to the Bf 109 F-2.

== Eastern Front ==
Ostermann's Bf 109F-2 "white 2" bearing 33 victory marks, September 1941

On 23 June 1941, during the opening phase of Operation Barbarossa, the German invasion of the Soviet Union, Ostermann, in a free-hunting mission in the Lithuanian airspace north of Kaunas, intercepted a formation of nine Tupolev SB's and claimed two shot down in flames. Ostermann survived a belly landing following combat with more SBs in south-eastern Latvia on 26 June. On 5 July he claimed three SB-3 Soviet bombers in combat over the Velikaya River at Ostrov. He claimed his 19th and 20th aerial victory on 6 July in the same combat area. On the Eastern Front he claimed JG 54's 1,000th victory of the war on 1 August 1941. (Note: The credit may also have gone to Oberleutnant Günther Scholz.) He became the eighth member of JG 54 to receive the Knight's Cross of the Iron Cross (Ritterkreuz des Eisernen Kreuzes) on 4 September 1941 after 29 aerial victories. The award was presented on 10 September 1941 in Dno by Generaloberst (Colonel General) Alfred Keller.

From 1 August to 18 September 1941, Ostermann temporarily led 7./JG 54 (7th squadron), substituting for Oberleutnant Günther Scholz who had been wounded in combat. From 5 November to 5 December 1941, Ostermann again temporarily led a Staffel, this time substituting for Oberleutnant Hans Schmoller-Haldy from 3./JG 54 (3rd squadron). He claimed his 50th aerial victory on 9 January 1942, the 60th on 28 January 1942 and the 70th on 19 February 1942. After this series of aerial victories Ostermann was sent on home leave. The reason for his leave was that he wanted to get married. Back home, on his way to his wedding ceremony, Ostermann was arrested and put in jail. A German police officer had assumed that Ostermann, with his childlike features, was actually a schoolboy who was playing a prank and illegally wearing a Luftwaffe uniform and military decorations. The consequences endured by the police officer for his bad judgement remain unknown.

After he received the Knight's Cross of the Iron Cross with Oak Leaves (Ritterkreuz des Eisernen Kreuzes mit Eichenlaub) for 62 aerial victories on 12 March 1942 he was appointed Staffelkapitän (squadron leader) of the 8./JG 54 (8th squadron). His 80th and 81st aerial victory were claimed on 19 March 1942 followed by victories number 89 and 90 on 27 April 1942. Ostermann claimed his 100th aerial victory on 12 May 1942, the second JG 54 pilot—Hans Philipp was the first—and sixth overall to achieve the century, though in the same engagement his Bf 109F-4 was hit and damaged. Ostermann himself was hit in the right arm and upper thigh. Although severely wounded, he managed to return to his home airfield. (Note: According to Berger he baled out and was rescued by the German infantry.) Five days later, while in the hospital, he was awarded the Knight's Cross of the Iron Cross with Oak Leaves and Swords (Ritterkreuz des Eisernen Kreuzes mit Eichenlaub und Schwertern). The award was presented at the Führerhauptquartier, the "Wolf's Lair" (Wolfsschanze) at Rastenburg, on 28 and 29 June 1942. During his absence, 8. Staffel was temporarily commanded by Oberleutnant Günter Fink.

Ostermann was killed in action on 9 August 1942 far behind Soviet lines east of Lake Ilmen. He and his wingman Unteroffizier Heinrich Bosin were flying at an altitude of 1,000 metres (3,300 ft) when they spotted a formation of nine Curtiss P-40 Warhawk's. Ostermann shot down the rear P-40. The two were reforming to make a second attack when they themselves were attacked from behind by a group of Soviet fighters emerging from the broken cloud cover. Ostermann's Bf 109G-2 (Werknummer 10438—factory number) was hit in the cockpit by 41 IAP's (41st Fighter Aviation Regiment) Starshiy Leytenant (First Lieutenant) Arkady Ivanovich Sukov flying a LaGG-3. (Note: IAP—Istrebitelny Aviatsionny Polk (Fighter Aviation Regiment—Истребительный Авиационный Полк)) The aircraft rolled over and crashed into the edge of a small wood. After Werner Mölders and Leopold Steinbatz, Ostermann was the third of 45 recipients of the Knight's Cross of the Iron Cross with Oak Leaves and Swords to die in World War II. This made him the first Swords recipient to be lost in air combat, as Mölders death was accidental and Steinbatz had only received the Oak Leaves before he died. Following his death, command of 8. Staffel was officially passed on to Fink.

== Summary of career ==
=== Aerial victory claims ===
According to US historian David T. Zabecki, Ostermann was credited with 102 aerial victories. Mathews and Foreman, authors of Luftwaffe Aces — Biographies and Victory Claims, researched the German Federal Archives and found records for 102 aerial victory claims, plus six further unconfirmed claims. This number includes eight claims on the Western Front, one in Yugoslavia, and 93 Soviet Air Forces piloted aircraft on the Eastern Front.

Victory claims were logged to a map-reference (PQ = Planquadrat), for example "PQ 10481". The Luftwaffe grid map covered all of Europe, western Russia and North Africa and was composed of rectangles measuring 15 minutes of latitude by 30 minutes of longitude, an area of about 360 square miles (930 km^{2}). These sectors were then subdivided into 36 smaller units to give a location area 3 km × 4 km (1.9 mi × 2.5 mi) in size.

Chronicle of aerial victories
This and the – (dash) indicates unconfirmed aerial victory claims for which Ostermann did not receive credit. This and the ? (question mark) indicates information discrepancies listed by Prien, Stemmer, Rodeike, Bock, Mathews and Foreman.
Claim	Date	Time	Type	Location	Claim	Date	Time	Type	Location
– 1. Staffel of Jagdgeschwader 21 –
1	20 May 1940	18:20	M.S.406	west of Péronne	2	26 May 1940	09:06	Curtiss	Arras
– 7. Staffel of Jagdgeschwader 54 –
3	12 August 1940	09:35? (Note: According to Mathews and Foreman claimed at 09:32.)	Spitfire	Canterbury	—	12 August 1941	—	I-16	
4	30 August 1940	19:05	Spitfire		23	14 August 1941	17:01	I-153	
5	5 September 1940	10:40	Hurricane? (Note: According to Mathews and Foreman claimed at Supermarine Spitfire.)		24	14 August 1941	17:04	I-153	
6	30 September 1940	14:37	Spitfire	Tonbridge	25	17 August 1941	11:37	I-16	
7	8 October 1940	11:46	Spitfire		26	18 August 1941	05:25	I-16	
8	20 October 1940	15:38	Spitfire	southeast of London	27	18 August 1941	11:02	I-16	
9	6 April 1941	12:43	Bf 109	Belgrade	28	21 August 1941	10:45	I-16	
10	23 June 1941	11:51	SB-2	north of Kaunas	29	23 August 1941	08:03	I-16	vicinity of Reval
11	23 June 1941	11:58	SB-2	north of Kaunas	—	4 September 1941	—	I-16	
12	26 June 1941	18:32	DB-3	vicinity of Dünaburg	30	5 September 1941	15:45	I-16	
13	30 June 1941	12:10	DB-3		31	7 September 1941	14:25	I-18 (MiG-1)	
14	30 June 1941	12:11	DB-3		32	7 September 1941	14:30	I-18 (MiG-1)	
15	30 June 1941	12:15	DB-3	vicinity of Dünaburg	33	8 September 1941? (Note: According to Mathews and Foreman claimed at 9 September 1941.)	17:25	I-18 (MiG-1)	
16	5 July 1941	20:04	SB-3	vicinity of Ostrov	34	10 September 1941	10:24	I-26 (Yak-1)	
17	5 July 1941	20:05	SB-3	vicinity of Ostrov	35	11 September 1941	07:51	I-15	vicinity of Staraya Russa
18	5 July 1941	20:08	SB-3	vicinity of Ostrov	36	11 September 1941	10:12	SB-3	vicinity of Staraya Russa
19	6 July 1941	17:35	SB-3	east of Ostrov	—	12 September 1941	—	DB-3	vicinity of Staraya Russa
20	6 July 1941	17:37	SB-3	east of Ostrov	37	17 September 1941	10:24	I-18 (MiG-1)	
21	28 July 1941	20:03	I-18 (MiG-1)		—	7 October 1941	—	I-18 (MiG-1)	
22	1 August 1941	19:06	DB-3		38	25 October 1941	14:15	I-26 (Yak-1)	
—	10 August 1941	—	I-18 (MiG-1)		39	29 October 1941	13:50	I-26 (Yak-1)	
—	10 August 1941	—	I-18 (MiG-1)		40	30 October 1941	11:35	ground attack aircraft	north of Mind
– 3. Staffel of Jagdgeschwader 54 –
41	13 November 1941	15:04	Pe-2		52	20 January 1942	14:22	I-26 (Yak-1)	
42	16 November 1941	15:16? (Note: According to Mathews and Foreman claimed at 15:18.)	I-26 (Yak-1)		53	23 January 1942	11:03	I-16	
43	16 November 1941	15:20	I-26 (Yak-1)		54	23 January 1942	11:27	Il-2	
44	19 November 1941	08:35	PS-84 (DC-3)		55	24 January 1942	13:07	I-16	
45	30 November 1941	13:45	PS-84 (DC-3)		56	25 January 1942	10:45	MBR-2	
46	1 December 1941	15:10	Yak-1	10 km (6.2 mi) northeast of Leningrad	57	25 January 1942	11:12	I-153	
47	1 January 1942	12:37	I-26 (Yak-1)		58	25 January 1942	11:26	I-153	
48	8 January 1942	13:42	I-26 (Yak-1)		59	26 January 1942	13:21	Pe-2	
49	8 January 1942	13:50	I-180 (Yak-7)		60	28 January 1942	09:18	I-15	
50	9 January 1942	15:15	I-26 (Yak-7)		61	28 January 1942	15:01	I-18 (MiG-1)	
51	11 January 1942	15:05	I-18 (MiG-1)		62	1 February 1942	10:50	P-40	
– 8. Staffel of Jagdgeschwader 54 –
63	14 March 1942	17:07	I-26 (Yak-1)		83	1 April 1942	18:12	I-18 (MiG-1)	
64	16 March 1942	08:26? (Note: According to Mathews and Foreman claimed at 09:30.)	I-26 (Yak-1)		84	23 April 1942	12:30	MiG-3	
65	17 March 1942	10:06	I-18 (MiG-1)		85	23 April 1942	12:30	MiG-3	
66	17 March 1942	14:00	R-Z? (Note: According to Mathews and Foreman claimed at Polikarpov R-5.)		86	23 April 1942	16:02	MiG-3	
67	17 March 1942	14:03	R-Z?		87	24 April 1942	06:41	R-Z?	
68	18 March 1942	16:35	P-40		88	25 April 1942	11:30	I-180 (Yak-7)	
69	18 March 1942	17:02	biplane? (Note: According to Mathews and Foreman claimed at Seversky.)		89	27 April 1942	06:15	P-40	
70	19 March 1942	11:15	P-40		90	27 April 1942	18:18	P-40	
71	19 March 1942	11:42? (Note: According to Mathews and Foreman claimed at 11:48.)	I-18 (MiG-1)		91	29 April 1942	16:22	MiG-3	
72	20 March 1942	12:21	I-18 (MiG-1)		92	29 April 1942	16:25	MiG-3	
73	20 March 1942	17:21	R-Z?		93	30 April 1942	13:41	P-40	
74	21 March 1942	11:40? (Note: According to Mathews and Foreman claimed at 11:10.)	I-18 (MiG-1)		94	30 April 1942	14:06	MiG-3	
75	22 March 1942	17:43? (Note: According to Mathews and Foreman claimed at 17:13.)	I-18 (MiG-1)		95	6 May 1942	18:12	I-180 (Yak-7)	
76	22 March 1942	17:35	I-18 (MiG-1)		96	6 May 1942	18:19	I-180 (Yak-7)	
77	28 March 1942	10:14? (Note: According to Mathews and Foreman claimed at 10:16.)	I-18 (MiG-1)		97	9 May 1942	15:23	P-40	
78	29 March 1942	09:28	I-16		98	10 May 1942	08:25	Yak-7	PQ 10481; 35 km (22 mi) northeast of Lubań
79	29 March 1942	11:57	I-18 (MiG-1)		99	12 May 1942	09:36	I-16	PQ 10362; 25 km (16 mi) southeast of Mga
80	29 March 1942	12:05	I-18 (MiG-1)		100	12 May 1942	09:41	I-16	
81	31 March 1942	13:15	I-18 (MiG-1)		101	8 August 1942	18:58	P-40	PQ 29561; 55 km (34 mi) south-southeast of Malaya Vishera
82	31 March 1942	13:33	I-18 (MiG-1)		102	9 August 1942	11:33	P-40	PQ 29521, Dalewo; 45 km (28 mi) south of Malaya Vishera

=== Awards ===
- Wound Badge in Black
- Front Flying Clasp of the Luftwaffe in Gold with Pennant "300"
- Combined Pilots-Observation Badge
- Iron Cross (1939)
  - 2nd Class (31 May 1940)
  - 1st Class (1940)
- Knight's Cross of the Iron Cross with Oak Leaves and Swords
  - Knight's Cross on 4 September 1941 as Leutnant and pilot in the 7./Jagdgeschwader 54
  - 81st Oak Leaves on 12 March 1942 as Oberleutnant and Staffelkapitän of the 7./Jagdgeschwader 54
  - 10th Swords on 17 May 1942 as Oberleutnant and Staffelkapitän of the 7./Jagdgeschwader 54
