= Herbert Findeisen =

German World War II flying ace and aerial reconnaissance pilot

- Born: 11 July 1913; Crimmitschau, German Empire
- Died: 11 May 1963 (aged 49); Heide, Schleswig-Holstein, West Germany
- Military career
- Allegiance: Nazi Germany
- Branch: Luftwaffe
- Service years: 1933–1945
- Rank: Hauptmann
- Units: Nahaufklärungs-Gruppe 4 Jagdgeschwader 54
- Commands: II./JG 54
- Conflicts: World War II: Eastern Front
- Awards: Knight's Cross of the Iron Cross

Herbert Findeisen (11 July 1913 – 11 May 1963) was a German Luftwaffe ace and recipient of the Knight's Cross of the Iron Cross during World War II. During his career Herbert Findeisen was credited with 67 aerial victories, all on the Eastern Front.

== Career ==
Findeisen was born on 11 July 1913 in Crimmitschau, at the time in Province of Saxony, a province of the Kingdom of Prussia within the German Empire. He joined the military service of the Reichsheer in 1933 and transferred to the Luftwaffe in 1935 where he was trained as an aerial observer.

On 29 February 1944, Findeisen was awarded the Knight's Cross of the Iron Cross (Ritterkreuz des Eisernen Kreuzes) for 36 aerial victories claimed. In February 1945, Findeisen succeeded Hauptmann Erich Rudorffer, who was transferred, as Gruppenkommandeur (group commander) of II. Gruppe (2nd group) of Jagdgeschwader 54 (JG 54—54th Fighter Wing). Findeisen led this Gruppe until the German surrender on 8 May 1945. At the time, II. Gruppe was based at Libau, present-day Liepāja, and was fighting in the Courland Pocket.

Findeisen was killed in an automobile accident on 11 May 1963 in Heide.

== Summary of career ==
=== Aerial victory claims ===
According to US historian David T. Zabecki, Findeisen was credited with 67 aerial victories. Spick also list him with 67 aerial victories on the Eastern Front, claimed in an unknown number of combat missions, including 42 claims as an aerial reconnaissance pilot.

=== Awards and decorations ===
- Aviator badge
- Front Flying Clasp of the Luftwaffe in Gold
- Iron Cross (1939) 2nd and 1st Class
- German Cross in Gold on 26 November 1943 as Hauptmann in the 2./Nahaufklärungs-Gruppe 4
- Knight's Cross of the Iron Cross on 29 February 1944 as Hauptmann and pilot and observer in the 2.(H)/Nahaufklärungs-Gruppe 4 (Note: According to Scherzer as pilot and observer in the 2./Nahaufklärungsgruppe 4.)

== Notes ==
Military offices
Preceded by Hauptmann Erich Rudorffer	Commander of II. Jagdgeschwader 54; February 1945–8 May 1945	Succeeded by None
