= Horst Ademeit =

German World War II flying ace (1912–1944)

- Ademeit as a Hauptmann
- Born: 8 February 1912; Breslau, German Empire
- Died: 7 August 1944 (aged 32) (MIA) disappeared near Dünaburg
- Military career
- Allegiance: Nazi Germany
- Branch: Luftwaffe
- Service years: 1936–1944
- Rank: Major (majr)
- Unit: JG 54
- Commands: I./JG 54
- Conflicts: See battles World War II: Battle of Britain; Operation Barbarossa; Eastern Front (MIA)
- Awards: Knight's Cross of the Iron Cross with Oak Leaves

Horst Ademeit (8 February 1912 – 7 August 1944) was a German Luftwaffe fighter ace and recipient of the Knight's Cross of the Iron Cross with Oak Leaves (German: Ritterkreuz des Eisernen Kreuzes mit Eichenlaub) during World War II. Ademeit fought in the Battle of Britain and the Eastern Front where he was officially credited with 166 aerial victories before his disappearance during a mission over Latvia on 7 August 1944.

== Early life ==
Horst Ademeit was born on 8 February 1912 in Breslau in the Kingdom of Prussia of the German Empire (present-day Wrocław, Poland) the son of Walter Ademeit, a Regierungsbaurat (government building officer). He studied chemistry at the Königsberg Albertina University and was a member of the Corps Masovia Königsberg. In 1933, he transferred to the Technische Hochschule in Charlottenburg, Berlin (now Technische Universität Berlin) while his family had moved to nearby Potsdam, where his father was leading the construction of the Niederfinow Boat Lift.

On 1 August 1936, Ademeit joined the Luftwaffe as a reservist. He graduated as a Diplom Ingenieur from the Technische Hochschule in Braunschweig (now Technische Universität Braunschweig) in 1938. On 9 December 1938, Ademeit was made an officer cadet of the reserves and received flight training. (Note: Flight training in the Luftwaffe progressed through the levels A1, A2 and B1, B2, referred to as A/B flight training. A training included theoretical and practical training in aerobatics, navigation, long-distance flights and dead-stick landings. The B courses included high-altitude flights, instrument flights, night landings and training to handle the aircraft in difficult situations.)

== World War II ==
In the spring of 1940, Unteroffizier Ademeit was transferred to 1. Staffel of Jagdgeschwader 54 (JG 54—54th Fighter Wing) Grünherz and participated in the Battle of Britain. (Note: For an explanation of the meaning of Luftwaffe unit designation see Luftwaffe Organization) He claimed his first aerial victory during the Battle of Britain on 18 September 1940. However, shortly afterwards, he was shot down in his Messerschmitt Bf 109 E-1 (Werknummer 6220—factory number) over the English Channel. Bailing out, he was rescued by the Seenotdienst unharmed.

In June 1941, after the German invasion of Soviet Union, Ademeit accompanied I./JG 54 to the Eastern Front. In quick succession he achieved aerial victories, promotions, and awards. On 7 March 1943, Ademeit was appointed Staffelkapitän (squadron leader) of 6. Staffel of JG 54, replacing Oberleutnant Hans Beißwenger who was killed in action the day before. In October 1943, Ademeit was credited with his 100th aerial victory. He was the 61st Luftwaffe pilot to achieve the century mark.

On 4 February 1944, Ademeit succeeded Hauptmann Walter Nowotny as Gruppenkommandeur (group commander of I. Gruppe of JG 54. On 14 February, I. Gruppe moved to an airfield named Wesenberg near Rakvere, located approximately 60 kilometers (37 miles) north of Lake Peipus and 105 kilometers (65 miles) west of Narva. Here the Gruppe was subordinated to the 3. Flieger-Division (3rd Air Division) and fought in the Battle of Narva.

=== Disappearance ===
On 7 August 1944, Ademeit, flying a Focke-Wulf Fw 190 A-5 (Werksnummer 5960), led a flight of four Fw 190s to the combat area near Kreutzburg on the right bank of the Daugava, where they intercepted a flight of ten Ilyushin Il-2s and Yakovlev Yak-9 fighters at 15:17. His wingman, Gefreiter Biebrichter, later reported that Ademeit was last seen in pursuit of an Il-2 into a thick cloud of smoke. He pursued the Il-2 eastwards near Dünaburg across the front line, but failed to return from this mission and was considered missing in action.

Ademeit was succeeded by Hauptmann Franz Eisenach as commander of I. Gruppe. Berlin radio announced his loss on 29 September 1944. Ademeit was officially credited with 166 victories in over 600 missions over the Eastern Front. He was posthumously promoted to Major.

== Summary of career ==
=== Aerial victory claims ===
According to American historian David T. Zabecki, Ademeit was credited with 166 aerial victories. Scutts also lists him with the same number of aerial victories. In addition, Spick states that Ademeit flew approximately 600 combat missions and a mission-to-claim ratio of 3.61. Mathews and Foreman, authors of Luftwaffe Aces — Biographies and Victory Claims, researched the German Federal Archives and found documentation for 160 aerial victory claims, all of which confirmed and claimed on the Eastern Front. The authors Prien, Stemmer, Rodeike and Bock list six further victories, aerial victories numbered 99–104, which were not documented by Mathews and Foreman, in the timeframe 18 September to 3 October 1943.

Victory claims were logged to a map-reference (PQ = Planquadrat), for example, "PQ 2525." The Luftwaffe grid map (Jägermeldenetz) covered all of Europe, western Russia, and North Africa and was composed of rectangles measuring 15 minutes of latitude by 30 minutes of longitude, an area of about 360 square miles (930 km^{2}). These sectors were then subdivided into 36 smaller units to give a location area 3 km × 4 km (1.9 mi × 2.5 mi) in size.

Chronicle of aerial victories
This and the ♠ (Ace of spades) indicates those aerial victories which made Ademeit an "ace-in-a-day", a term which designates a fighter pilot who has shot down five or more airplanes in a single day. This and the ? (question mark) indicates information discrepancies listed by Prien, Stemmer, Rodeike, Balke, Bock, Mathews and Foreman.
| Claim | Date | Time | Type | Location | Claim | Date | Time | Type | Location |
– 1. Staffel of Jagdgeschwader 54 – Operation Barbarossa — 22 June – 5 December 1941
| 1 | 23 June 1941 | 10:13 | SB-2 | PQ 2525 | 8 | 24 September 1941 | 10:11 | I-15? (Note: According to Mathews and Foreman claimed as a Polikarpov I-153.) | |
| 2 | 6 July 1941 | 17:35 | SB-3 | | 9 | 7 October 1941 | 16:25 | MBR-2 | |
| 3 | 7 August 1941 | 18:13 | I-16 | | 10 | 9 October 1941 | 07:47 | I-26 (Yak-1) | |
| 4 | 27 August 1941 | 19:00 | I-16 | | 11 | 12 October 1941 | 09:57 | U-2 | |
| 5 | 5 September 1941 | 17:35 | I-26 (Yak-1) | | 12 | 25 October 1941 | 13:27 | I-18 (MiG-1) | |
| 6 | 5 September 1941 | 18:04 | R-5 | | 13 | 6 November 1941 | 12:42 | Pe-2 | |
| 7 | 23 September 1941 | 13:17 | I-153 | | 14 | 3 December 1941 | 12:11 | I-16 | |
– 1. Staffel of Jagdgeschwader 54 – Eastern Front — 6 December 1941 – 30 April 1942
| 15 | 8 January 1942 | 09:55 | I-26 (Yak-1) | | 18 | 7 February 1942 | 08:33 | I-18 (MiG-1) | |
| 16 | 8 January 1942 | 13:14 | SB-2 | Guijka | 19 | 16 February 1942 | 07:45 | Il-2 | |
| 17 | 20 January 1942 | 11:23 | I-26 (Yak-1) | | 20 | 18 February 1942 | 13:15 | I-16 | |
– 1. Staffel of Jagdgeschwader 54 – Eastern Front — 1 May 1942 – 3 February 1943
| 21 | 5 May 1942 | 18:42 | Yak-1 | Leningrad | 29 | 9 September 1942 | 18:10? (Note: According to Mathews and Foreman claimed at 18:30.) | MiG-3 | PQ 11802; 35 km (22 mi) northwest of Volkhov |
| 22 | 10 May 1942 | 06:50 | P-40 | PQ 10621 | 30 | 22 October 1942 | 07:35 | I-153 | PQ 11762 over Lake Ladoga |
| 23 | 12 May 1942 | 11:10 | Yak-1 | east of Possademkowo | 31 | 6 November 1942 | 08:22 | P-40 | northern Leningrad |
| 24 | 12 May 1942 | 11:15 | Yak-1 | PQ 10463 | 32 | 16 December 1942 | 09:35 | Pe-2 | PQ 11852; 40 km (25 mi) northwest of Volkhov |
| 25 | 29 May 1942 | 10:20 | SB-3 | | 33 | 12 January 1943 | 09:20 | Il-2 | PQ 10151 southeast of Shlisselburg |
| 26 | 30 May 1942 | 05:32 | MiG-3 | | 34 | 12 January 1943 | 14:08 | Yak-1 | PQ 10182 vicinity of Shlisselburg |
| 27 | 30 May 1942 | 18:34 | P-40 | | 35 | 27 January 1943 | 09:30 | Il-2 | PQ 00294; 10 km (6.2 mi) west of Mga |
| 28 | 8 June 1942 | 15:25 | P-40 | | 36 | 27 January 1943 | 14:40 | LaGG-3 | PQ 10123 east of Shlisselburg |
– 1. Staffel of Jagdgeschwader 54 – Eastern Front — February 1943
| 37 | 11 February 1943 | 09:58 | Il-2 | PQ 36 Ost 00454; 15 km (9.3 mi) east-southeast of Slutsk | 42 | 22 February 1943 | 15:05 | Il-2 | PQ 36 Ost 10123 east of Shlisselburg |
| 38 | 11 February 1943 | 10:00 | Il-2 | PQ 36 Ost 00424; Pushkin-Mga | 43 | 23 February 1943 | 07:05 | Il-2 | PQ 36 Ost 10151 southeast of Shlisselburg |
| 39 | 15 February 1943 | 07:50 | LaGG-3 | PQ 36 Ost 10483; 35 km (22 mi) northeast of Lyuban | 44 | 23 February 1943 | 11:15 | La-5 | PQ 36 Ost 10172; 25 km (16 mi) northeast of Leningrad |
| 40 | 18 February 1943 | 09:35 | La-5 | PQ 36 Ost 10444; 30 km (19 mi) southeast of Mga | 45 | 27 February 1943 | 08:35 | LaGG-3 | PQ 36 Ost 10254; 30 km (19 mi) west-southwest of Shlisselburg |
| 41 | 21 February 1943 | 13:25 | La-5 | PQ 36 Ost 10454; 40 km (25 mi) northeast of Lyuban | | | | | |
– 6. Staffel of Jagdgeschwader 54 – Eastern Front — March – 31 December 1943
| 46 | 13 March 1943 | 15:16 | R-5 | PQ 36 Ost 20122, north of Wolchowstroj west of Volkhov | 73 | 2 August 1943 | 08:51 | Yak-7 | PQ 36 Ost 10184 east of Mga |
| 47 | 15 March 1943 | 15:55 | LaGG-3 | PQ 35 Ost 18284; 30 km (19 mi) southeast of Staraya Russa | 74 | 2 August 1943 | 13:19 | Yak-7 | PQ 36 Ost 10161 southeast of Shlisselburg |
| 48 | 16 March 1943 | 15:20 | LaGG-3 | PQ 35 Ost 18342; 20 km (12 mi) southeast of Staraya Russa | 75 | 2 August 1943 | 19:22 | La-5 | PQ 36 Ost 10354; 20 km (12 mi) southeast of Mga |
| 49 | 19 March 1943 | 10:00 | Il-2 | PQ 36 Ost 00411; 10 km (6.2 mi) east of Pushkin | 76 | 7 August 1943 | 11:05 | LaGG-3 | PQ 35 Ost 54818; 35 km (22 mi) west-southwest of Bolkhov |
| 50 | 21 March 1943 | 12:03 | La-5 | PQ 36 Ost 00271; 15 km (9.3 mi) northeast of Pushkin | 77 | 7 August 1943 | 14:02 | Il-2 | PQ 35 Ost 54684; 20 km (12 mi) southwest of Bolkhov |
| 51 | 23 March 1943 | 17:10 | P-40 | PQ 36 Ost 00412; 10 km (6.2 mi) east of Pushkin | 78 | 14 August 1943 | 05:00 | La-5 | PQ 35 Ost 45772; 15 km (9.3 mi) west-southwest of Kirov |
| 52 | 25 March 1943 | 07:50 | Yak-1 | PQ 36 Ost 00283; 20 km (12 mi) west of Mga | 79 | 16 August 1943 | 13:28 | Il-2 | PQ 35 Ost 45752, northwest of Kirov; 5 km (3.1 mi) northwest of Kirov |
| 53 | 3 April 1943 | 18:15 | Yak-1 | PQ 36 Ost RD 57 | 80 | 17 August 1943 | 08:52 | Yak-9 | PQ 35 Ost 44583; 20 km (12 mi) west of Karachev |
| 54 | 1 June 1943 | 16:17 | LaGG-3 | PQ 36 Ost 21774; 30 km (19 mi) north of Volkhov | 81 | 17 August 1943 | 09:27 | Il-2 | PQ 35 Ost 43663; 20 km (12 mi) southwest of Dmitrowsk |
| 55 | 5 June 1943 | 12:13 | LaGG-3 | PQ 36 Ost 21752; 30 km (19 mi) north of Volkhov | 82 | 20 August 1943 | 06:22 | La-5 | PQ 35 Ost 43824; 15 km (9.3 mi) east-northeast of Sevsk |
| 56 | 12 June 1943 | 11:25 | La-5 | PQ 26 Ost 90131; 10 km (6.2 mi) west of Lomonossow | 83 | 21 August 1943 | 16:42 | La-5 | PQ 35 Ost 43853; 15 km (9.3 mi) southeast of Sevsk |
| 57 | 18 June 1943 | 17:15 | LaGG-3 | PQ 36 Ost 20174 south of Volchov | 84 | 22 August 1943 | 06:22 | P-39 | PQ 35 Ost 4382 |
| 58 | 18 June 1943 | 17:17 | La-5 | PQ 36 Ost 20421; 30 km (19 mi) southeast of Volkhov | 85 | 23 August 1943 | 10:00 | P-39 | PQ 35 Ost 43893; 30 km (19 mi) southeast of Sevsk |
| 59 | 22 June 1943 | 19:22? (Note: According to Mathews and Foreman claimed at 19:20.) | LaGG-3 | PQ 36 Ost 01751; 20 km (12 mi) north of Leningrad | 86 | 23 August 1943 | 18:35 | P-39 | PQ 35 Ost 43851; 15 km (9.3 mi) southeast of Sevsk |
| 60 | 12 July 1943 | 18:27? (Note: According to Mathews and Foreman claimed at 18:20.) | La-5 | PQ 35 Ost 64863; 30 km (19 mi) southeast of Mtsensk | 87 | 24 August 1943 | 14:55 | La-5 | PQ 35 Ost 44472; 15 km (9.3 mi) east-southeast of Dyatkovo |
| 61 | 13 July 1943 | 06:53 | La-5 | PQ 35 Ost 63293; 55 km (34 mi) southeast of Oryol | 88 | 28 August 1943 | 11:47 | Yak-9 | PQ 35 Ost 43674; 15 km (9.3 mi) northeast of Sevsk |
| 62 | 13 July 1943 | 06:54 | Yak-7 | PQ 35 Ost 63261; 55 km (34 mi) east-southeast of Oryol | 89 | 30 August 1943 | 14:21 | La-5 | PQ 35 Ost 35611; 25 km (16 mi) southeast of Yelnya |
| 63 | 13 July 1943 | 06:56 | Il-2 | PQ 35 Ost 63234; 40 km (25 mi) southeast of Mtsensk | 90 | 31 August 1943 | 06:47 | LaGG-3 | PQ 35 Ost 35624; 20 km (12 mi) west-northwest of Spas-Demensk |
| 64 | 13 July 1943 | 11:06 | La-5 | PQ 35 Ost 63283; 25 km (16 mi) southeast of Mtsensk | 91 | 31 August 1943 | 15:28 | Yak-9 | PQ 35 Ost 35582; 30 km (19 mi) south of Yelnya |
| 65 | 14 July 1943 | 14:10 | LaGG-3 | PQ 35 Ost 54353; 30 km (19 mi) southeast of Zhizdra | 92 | 31 August 1943 | 15:38 | Yak-9 | PQ 35 Ost 35384, southwest of Jelnja; 5 km (3.1 mi) southeast of Yelnya |
| 66 | 16 July 1943 | 18:45 | Il-2 | PQ 35 Ost 63524; 15 km (9.3 mi) west-northwest of Maloarkhangelsk | 93 | 2 September 1943 | 12:30 | La-5 | PQ 35 Ost 35381; 5 km (3.1 mi) southeast of Yelnya |
| 67 | 17 July 1943 | 06:42 | La-5 | PQ 35 Ost 54474; 25 km (16 mi) west-northwest of Bolkhov | 94 | 4 September 1943 | 17:02 | LaGG-3 | PQ 35 Ost 35374; 5 km (3.1 mi) southwest of Yelnya |
| 68 | 21 July 1943 | 17:18 | Pe-2 | PQ 35 Ost 53462; 40 km (25 mi) south-southwest of Oryol | 95 | 4 September 1943 | 17:06 | Yak-9 | PQ 35 Ost 35371, west of Jelnja; 5 km (3.1 mi) southwest of Yelnya |
| 69 | 28 July 1943 | 09:14 | La-5 | PQ 36 Ost 10154 southeast of Shlisselburg | 96 | 5 September 1943 | 11:13 | P-39 | PQ 35 Ost 25631; 20 km (12 mi) southwest of Yelnya |
| 70 | 28 July 1943 | 09:17 | Yak-7 | PQ 36 Ost 10331; 20 km (12 mi) east-southeast of Mga | 97 | 5 September 1943 | 13:28 | Yak-9 | PQ 35 Ost 26814; 20 km (12 mi) north-northwest of Yartsevo |
| 71 | 28 July 1943 | 09:25 | La-5 | PQ 36 Ost 10334; 20 km (12 mi) east-southeast of Mga | 98 | 10 September 1943 | 10:50 | Hurricane | PQ 35 Ost 35372, northwest of Yelnya; 5 km (3.1 mi) southwest of Yelnya |
| 72 | 31 July 1943 | 18:15 | La-5 | PQ 36 Ost 10243; 25 km (16 mi) east-southeast of Shlisselburg | | | | | |
According to Prien, Stemmer, Rodeike and Bock, Ademeit claimed aerial victories 99–104, which were not documented, in the timeframe 18 September to 3 October 1943. These six claims are not listed by Mathews and Foreman.
| 105 | 7 October 1943 | 16:12 | La-5 | southeast of Kotitschi southeast of Ashitka | 118♠ | 12 October 1943 | 16:08 | La-5 | PQ 35 Ost 10131 east of Shlisselburg |
| 106 | 7 October 1943 | 16:14 | La-5 | PQ 35 Ost 01214; Lake Ladoga | 119 | 13 October 1943 | 15:40 | Yak-9 | PQ 35 Ost 01334; 70 km (43 mi) northeast of Zelenogorsk |
| 107 | 7 October 1943 | 16:19 | La-5 | west of Tchernin west of Tschermin | 120 | 14 October 1943 | 07:40 | La-5 | PQ 35 Ost 11512 over Lake Ladoga |
| 108 | 9 October 1943 | 11:32 | Yak-9 | PQ 35 Ost 01334; 70 km (43 mi) northeast of Zelenogorsk | 121 | 20 October 1943 | 14:11 | Yak-9 | PQ 35 Ost 01191 |
| 109 | 10 October 1943 | 15:55 | La-5 | PQ 35 Ost 11781 over Lake Ladoga | 122 | 20 October 1943 | 15:42 | Yak-9 | PQ 35 Ost 01391; 60 km (37 mi) northeast of Zelenogorsk |
| 110 | 10 October 1943 | 16:15 | La-5 | PQ 35 Ost 10121 east of Shlisselburg | 123 | 21 October 1943 | 07:12 | La-5 | PQ 35 Ost 11793; 25 km (16 mi) northeast of Shlisselburg |
| 111 | 11 October 1943 | 10:12 | La-5 | PQ 35 Ost 01122 | 124 | 21 October 1943 | 07:29 | Il-2 | PQ 35 Ost 10111 vicinity of Shlisselburg |
| 112 | 11 October 1943 | 15:51 | La-5 | PQ 35 Ost 10121 east of Shlisselburg | 125 | 21 October 1943 | 07:30 | Il-2 | PQ 35 Ost 11773 over Lake Ladoga |
| 113♠ | 12 October 1943 | 08:25 | La-5 | PQ 35 Ost 10122 east of Shlisselburg | 126 | 21 October 1943 | 09:52 | La-5 | PQ 35 Ost 10124 east of Shlisselburg |
| 114♠ | 12 October 1943 | 08:30 | La-5 | PQ 35 Ost 11784 over Lake Ladoga | 127 | 12 December 1943 | 07:28 | La-5 | PQ 35 Ost 00154; 10 km (6.2 mi) south of Leningrad |
| 115♠ | 12 October 1943 | 10:43 | Pe-2 | PQ 35 Ost 11791 over Lake Ladoga | 128 | 12 December 1943 | 07:30 | La-5 | PQ 35 Ost 01783; 10 km (6.2 mi) north of Leningrad |
| 116♠ | 12 October 1943 | 10:43 | Pe-2 | PQ 35 Ost 11791 over Lake Ladoga | 129 | 15 December 1943 | 07:20 | Yak-9 | PQ 25 Ost 91393; 40 km (25 mi) southeast of Vyborg |
| 117♠ | 12 October 1943 | 11:22 | La-5 | PQ 35 Ost 11763 over Lake Ladoga | 130 | 17 December 1943 | 08:08 | Yak-9 | PQ 35 Ost 00161 |
– 6. Staffel of Jagdgeschwader 54 – Eastern Front — 1 January – 3 February 1944
| 131 | 11 January 1944 | 14:00 | Pe-2 | PQ 26 Ost 80874; 40 km (25 mi) south-southeast of Narva | 135 | 15 January 1944 | 09:15 | La-5? (Note: According to Mathews and Foreman claimed as a Petlyakov Pe-2.) | PQ 26 Ost 80821; 30 km (19 mi) southeast of Narva |
| 132 | 14 January 1944 | 11:12? (Note: According to Mathews and Foreman claimed at 11:02.) | Il-2 | PQ 26 Ost 80691; 35 km (22 mi) east-southeast of Narva | 136 | 15 January 1944 | 09:20 | La-5 | PQ 26 Ost 80824; 30 km (19 mi) southeast of Narva |
| 133 | 15 January 1944 | 09:10 | La-5 | PQ 26 Ost 80831; 40 km (25 mi) southeast of Narva | 137 | 24 January 1944 | 14:14 | La-5 | PQ 26 Ost 80434; Gulf of Finland, northeast of Hungerburg |
| 134 | 15 January 1944 | 09:13 | La-5 | PQ 26 Ost 80822; 30 km (19 mi) southeast of Narva | | | | | |
– Stab I. Gruppe of Jagdgeschwader 54 – Eastern Front — 4 February – 7 August 1944
| 138 | 7 February 1944 | 10:41 | La-5 | PQ 35 Ost 05132 | 153 | 29 June 1944 | 19:47 | P-39 | PQ NS-8/1 |
| 139 | 5 March 1944 | 09:27? (Note: According to Mathews and Foreman claimed at 09:07.) | La-5 | PQ 26 Ost 70821; 25 km (16 mi) southwest of Narva | 154 | 2 July 1944 | 08:00 | Pe-2 | PQ OS-8/2 |
| 140 | 5 March 1944 | 12:20 | La-5 | PQ 26 Ost 70832; 20 km (12 mi) southwest of Narva | 155 | 2 July 1944 | 10:48 | P-39 | PQ OS-6/4 vicinity of Polotsk |
| 141 | 5 March 1944 | 12:45 | La-5 | PQ 26 Ost 80574 southwest of Narva | 156 | 2 July 1944 | 17:25 | P-39 | PQ OT-7/6 northeast of Polotsk |
| 142 | 9 March 1944 | 08:46 | Il-2? (Note: According to Mathews and Foreman claimed as a Lavochkin La-5.) | PQ 26 Ost 70524; 45 km (28 mi) west of Hungerburg | 157 | 3 July 1944 | 12:35 | Yak-9 | PQ OS-4/3 vicinity of Polotsk |
| 143 | 9 March 1944 | 11:40 | Il-2 | PQ 26 Ost 80682; 30 km (19 mi) southwest of Narva | 158 | 3 July 1944 | 12:38 | Yak-9 | PQ OS-7/6 vicinity of Polotsk |
| 144 | 18 March 1944 | 15:43 | La-5 | PQ 26 Ost 70182; 50 km (31 mi) northeast of Kunda | 159 | 21 July 1944 | 09:21? (Note: According to Mathews and Foreman claimed at 09:31.) | Il-2 | PQ OL-2/3 |
| 145 | 19 March 1944 | 10:35 | Yak-9 | PQ 26 Ost 80573 vicinity of Hungerburg | 160 | 21 July 1944 | 09:26 | P-39 | PQ NM-8/6 |
| 146 | 23 March 1944 | 11:30? (Note: According to Mathews and Foreman claimed at 11:26.) | Yak-9 | PQ 26 Ost 70593; 55 km (34 mi) southeast of Kunda | 161 | 21 July 1944 | 19:09? (Note: According to Mathews and Foreman claimed at 19:00.) | La-5 | PQ NN-1/8 |
| 147 | 28 March 1944 | 16:18? (Note: According to Mathews and Foreman claimed over a Lavochkin La-5 at 16:19.) | LaGG-3? | PQ 25 Ost 89231; 80 km (50 mi) northeast of Opotschka | 162 | 22 July 1944 | 09:26 | Yak-9 | PQ NM-9/7 |
| 148 | 30 March 1944 | 08:30 | La-5 | PQ 26 Ost 6025 | 163 | 23 July 1944 | 14:17 | Il-2 | PQ NN-7/4 vicinity of Daugavpils |
| 149 | 21 April 1944 | 14:25 | Yak-9 | 15 km (9.3 mi) southwest of Narva | 164 | 23 July 1944 | 14:20 | Yak-9 | PQ NN-7/5 vicinity of Daugavpils |
| 150 | 28 May 1944 | 08:32 | LaGG-3 | PQ 26 Ost 70691; 15 km (9.3 mi) southwest of Narva | 165 | 25 July 1944 | 13:58 | P-39 | PQ ON-6/6 |
| 151 | 28 June 1944 | 08:12? (Note: According to Mathews and Foreman claimed at 08:52.) | P-39 | | 166 | 27 July 1944 | 15:50 | Pe-2 | PQ NN-7/5 vicinity of Mitau |
| 152 | 29 June 1944 | 04:18 | Yak-9 | PQ NR-5/3 | | | | | |

=== Awards ===
- Iron Cross (1939)
  - 2nd Class (7 September 1940)
  - 1st Class (5 September 1941)
- Front Flying Clasp of the Luftwaffe for fighter pilots in Gold and Penant
- Honor Goblet of the Luftwaffe on 8 December 1941 as Leutnant and pilot
- German Cross in Gold on 25 February 1942 as Leutnant in the 1./Jagdgeschwader 54
- Knight's Cross of the Iron Cross with Oak Leaves
  - Knight's Cross on 16 April 1943 as Leutnant (war officer) and pilot in the I./Jagdgeschwader 54
  - 414th Oak Leaves on 2 March 1944 as Hauptmann (war officer) and Gruppenkommandeur of the I./Jagdgeschwader 54

== See also ==
- List of people who disappeared
