= Jagdgeschwader 54 =

- Unit insignia, featuring the "Green Heart" of Thuringia
- Active: 1939–1945
- Country: Nazi Germany
- Branch: Luftwaffe
- Type: Fighter Aircraft
- Role: Air superiority
- Size: Air Force Wing
- Nicknames: Grünherz, Green Hearts
- Engagements: Western Front: Battle of France; Battle of Britain; Eastern Front (World War II): German-Soviet air war 22 June 1941; Operation Barbarossa; Battle of Kursk

Commanders
- Notable commanders: Hannes Trautloft

Aircraft flown
- Fighter: Bf 109, Fw 190, Me 262

Jagdgeschwader 54 (JG 54) Grünherz was a Luftwaffe fighter wing that was founded in late 1936 and operated from 1939, the entire length of the Second World War. It later existed under the reformed Luftwaffe from 1947 to 1991 as BG54/B54 A B and C. Originally, JG 54 flew most of its missions on the Eastern Front where it claimed more than 9,600 aircraft shot down. It was the second-highest scoring wing in the Luftwaffe after JG 52 (+10,000 victories). Notable pilot aces (Experten) that flew with JG 54 included Walter Nowotny, Herbert Broennle, Otto Kittel, Hans-Ekkehard Bob, Max-Hellmuth Ostermann, Hugo Broch, Horst Ademeit and Hannes Trautloft.

JG 54 participated in the Invasion of Poland in 1939, and the Battle of Britain and invasion of the Balkans in 1940. The unit was transferred to the Eastern Front in the spring of 1941 in preparation for the invasion of the Soviet Union in Operation Barbarossa. It remained there for the rest of the Second World War. JG 54 first flew Bf 109Fs before changing to the more powerful Fw 190.

== Operational history ==
I./JG 54 was initially formed as I./JG 70 in July 1939. On 15 September 1939, I./JG 70 was redesignated I./JG 54. The initial unit designation for II./JG 54 was I./JG 138. This unit was raised in 1938 after the Anschluss of Austria and included many Austrian nationals. I./JG 138 became II./JG 54 on 6 April 1940. III./JG 54 was initially raised as I./JG 21 and redesignated III./JG 54 on 15 July 1939, with official records reflecting the change only after a year. Thus, III./JG 54 fought in Poland and France as I./JG 21.

=== Invasion of Poland and Battle of France ===
JG 54 took part the invasion of Poland in September–October 1939. Equipped with Bf 109s, their operations consisted of ground attack, air superiority and escorting Stukas. JG 54 was transferred back to Germany on 9 October 1939. Before the invasion of France, during a period known as Phoney War, it operated mainly in an air defence role.

Germany invaded France on 10 May 1940. The Luftwaffe operated by advancing in front of the German army to destroy French airfields and bomb cities, industrial complexes and transportation hubs. JG 54's role was to escort the bombers (Stukas and Heinkel He 111s mostly) and to conduct fighter sweeps in French airspace in order to maintain air superiority. The unit also operated at Dunkirk against the evacuating British Expeditionary Force. During the period 10 May to 21 June (until the capitulation of France), JG 54 claimed 17 aircraft, according to JG 54 documentation.

Before the Battle of Britain the wing was transferred to the Netherlands. In a British raid on the Soesterberg airfield, III./JG 54 suffered heavy ground crew and equipment losses. While in the Netherlands, the unit claimed another 21 aircraft.

=== The Battle of Britain ===
The Battle of Britain began in late July and early August, with the goal of destroying the RAF, a prerequisite of a land invasion of Britain. The three JG 54 squadrons were transferred to airfields near Calais. Fighter availability, at the starts of JG 54's Channel Front operations peaked at between 60 and 80 machines. The first major clash in the Battle came for JG 54 on 5 August 1940, when 1. and 3. Staffeln attacked six Spitfires of No. 64 Squadron over the Kent coast and shot down two, suffering a Bf 109 damaged.

Dissatisfied with the fighter arm's performance in the operation, Göring's purge led to a command shakeup in mid-1940. Major Hannes Trautloft was placed in command of JG 54. The Battle of Britain proved costly for both the Luftwaffe and JG 54. The wing lost 43 pilots (40 percent of its strength at the onset of the operations): 18 killed in action and two in accidents, 13 missing in action and 10 made prisoners. In return, JG 54 claimed 238 enemy aircraft destroyed. After the Luftwaffe's poor performance, the three squadrons were assigned to separate locations in Germany and France.

On 29 March 1941 Stab, II., and III./JG 54 were relocated to the Balkans, for the war against Yugoslavia. With the Balkans campaign over, the Geschwader's tally of air victories had risen to 376. The unit was moved to Pomerania to re-equip with the Bf 109F in preparation for Operation Barbarossa.

=== The Eastern Front ===
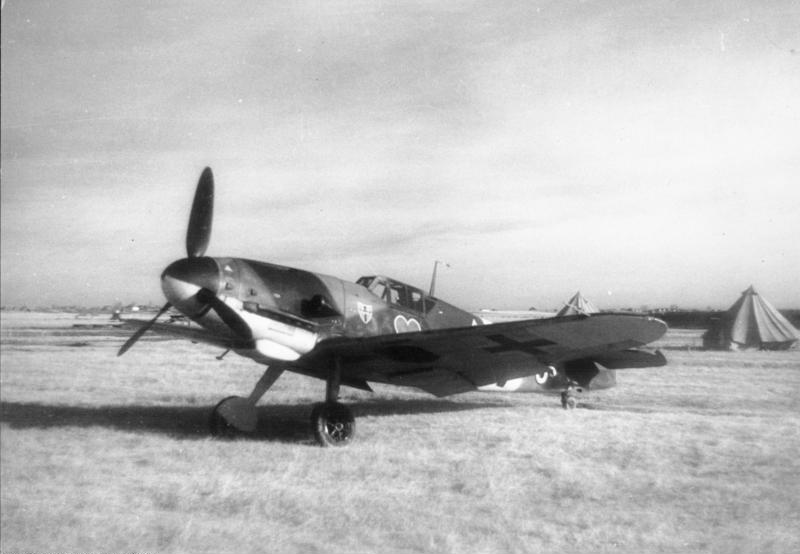
Bf 109G-2 of JG 54 on the Russian front, August 1942

JG 54 was assigned to Army Group North during Operation Barbarossa, the invasion of Soviet Union on 22 June 1941 as part of the Luftwaffe's Luftflotte 1. From the first days of the conflict, the unit proved to be one of the most effective units of the entire eastern front. June 30 was one of its most successful days of the entire war: JG 54 claimed no less than 65 kills (mostly bombers without fighters escort) over the town of Daugavpils. The "Grünherz" pushed on, still supporting Army Group North, towards the Gulf of Finland, fighting through Lithuania, Estonia and Latvia. JG 54's operations for 1941-43 had a twofold objective: to keep the pressure on the Leningrad sector, and to reduce Soviet pressure on the Lake Ilmen area at the German flank. The Geschwader remained on that part of the Eastern Front for most of its existence. In the period 22 June - 5 December 1941 the unit destroyed 1,078 Soviet aircraft in return for 46 losses in aerial combat and a single fighter on the ground. Such was the pace and scale of fighting that JG 54 celebrated its 1,000 kill on 1 August 1941, thanks to Leutnant Max-Hellmuth Ostermann. On 4 April 1942, Oberfeldwel Rudolf Klemm was credited with JG 54s 2,000th aerial victory. The 3,000th aerial victory was credited to Leutnant Hans-Joachim Heyer on 14 September.

JG 54 received its first Focke-Wulf Fw 190s in February 1943. On the 19th of that month had claimed its 4,000th aerial victory. On February 23, "Grünherz" obtained another of their greatest victories of the war, claiming 32 kills for no losses, in the Leningrad area. The following day I and III Gruppen claimed 43 more. By February 1943, JG 54 had flown 21,453 war sorties. I. Gruppe took part in the Battle of Kursk in July–August 1943. Feldwebel Helmut Missner was credited with JG 54's 5,000th aerial victory on 17 July. But I Gruppe lost not less than tre Kommandeuren in succession between 6 July and 4 August. Moreover, still in July, Trautloft had left JG 54, when General Adolf Galland asked him to join his staff (he ended the war with 57 victories and the Knight's Cross of the Iron Cross). After his departure, JG 54 continued operating in the area of Army Group North, and their victory tally rose continuously. The 7,000th JG 54 claim was made on 23 March 1944, with the 8,000 mark passed on 15 August.

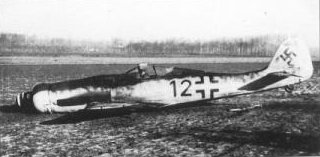
A Fw 190D-9 of 10./JG 54 Grünherz, pilot (Leutnant Theo Nibel), downed by a partridge which flew into the nose radiator near Brussels on 1 January 1945.

I., II. and IV./ JG 54 ended the war fighting around the Baltic region, supporting the troops of Army Group North through Latvia and Estonia, and into the Courland Pocket. JG 54 could never hope to regain air superiority against the mounting number of Russian aircraft. The Russians never defeated Army Group North, which held out until the last day of the war, surrendering 210,000 Germans to the Soviets in Courland.

All remaining serviceable Fw 190's of JG 54 were ordered to fly to Flensburg on the German-Danish border. 90 personnel from JG 54 were able to flee to the west by air. The German Navy evacuated as many as possible of the remaining ground personnel by ship.

=== The Western Front ===
In February 1943 III./JG 54 was transferred back to the west for operations against the RAF and USAAF. At first they operated as a stand-alone Bf 109G Gruppe, but later were attached to JG 26. Intensive training in the more rigorous techniques of fighting on the Western Front were only partly successful, and Oberst Josef Priller, Geschwaderkommodore of JG 26 and charged with III. Gruppe's training, refused to declare the gruppe operational. III Gruppe transferred to North Germany as a result, supporting Jagdgeschwader 1.

During the autumn of 1944, III./JG 54 was the first Luftwaffe unit to be supplied with the new Fw 190 D-9 "Dora". The D-9s were used in base defence missions for the Me 262 jets of Kommando Nowotny, and later over North-West Europe. 68 operational aircraft were available early in December, but due to heavy losses, the gruppe was disbanded soon after. Pilots Robert Weiß, the Gruppenkommandeur, and 12 other pilots were killed by RAF fighters on 29 December 1944 alone.

At the end of 1944 ZG 76 was disbanded and its pilots formed the nucleus of a new III./JG 54. Operating from Berlin, the unit's Fw 190s saw intensive action against Soviet ground targets such as road and rail supply columns, flak positions, armour and the bridges across the River Oder. A few weeks before the war ended, the depleted III./JG 54 was disbanded, being absorbed into JG 26.

Although Luftwaffe documentation were destroyed at the end of the war surviving records indicate JG 54 lost 491 pilots killed in action and 242 pilots missing. A further 322 pilots were wounded in action. The ground personnel lost 570 killed. Total losses in aircraft were approximately 1,071 Bf 109 and 746 Fw 190.

== Commanding officers ==
=== Geschwaderkommodore ===
- Major Martin Mettig, 1 February 1940 – 24 August 1940
- Oberst Hannes Trautloft, 25 August 1940 – 6 July 1943
- Major Hubertus von Bonin, 6 July 1943 – 15 December 43
- Oberstleutnant Anton Mader, 28 January 1944 – 30 September 1944
- Oberst Dietrich Hrabak, 1 October 1944 – 8 May 1945

=== Gruppenkommandeure ===
==== I./JG 54 ====
- Major Hans-Jürgen von Cramon-Taubadel, 15 September 1939 – 27 December 1939
- Hauptmann Hubertus von Bonin, 28 December 1939 – 1 July 1941
- Hauptmann Erich von Selle, 2 July 1941 – 20 December 1941
- Hauptmann Franz Eckerle, 20 December 1941 – 14 February 1942
- Hauptmann Hans Philipp, 17 February 1942 – 1 April 1943
- Major Reinhard Seiler, 15 April 1943 – 6 July 1943
- Major Gerhard Homuth, 1 August 1943 – 3 August 1943
- Oberleutnant Hans Götz (acting), 3 August 1943 – 4 August 1943
- Hauptmann Walter Nowotny, 21 August 1943 – 4 February 1944
- Hauptmann Horst Ademeit, 4 February 1944 – 8 August 1944
- Hauptmann Franz Eisenach, 9 August 1944 – 8 May 1945

==== II./JG 54 ====
- Hauptmann Wilfried Müller-Rienzburg, 1 April 1938 – 9 January 1940
- Major Albert Blumensaat, 10 January 1940 – 5 February 1940
- Major Richard Kraut, 5 February 1940 – 10 July 1940
- Hauptmann Otto Hans Winterer, 11 July 1940 – 14 August 1940
- Hauptmann Dietrich Hrabak, 26 August 1940 – 27 October 1942
- Major Hans "Assi" Hahn, 19 November 1942 – 21 February 1943
- Hauptmann Heinrich Jung, 21 February 1943 – 30 July 1943
- Hauptmann Erich Rudorffer, 1 August 1943 – February 1945
- Hauptmann Herbert Findeisen, February 1945 – 8 May 1945

==== III./JG 54 ====
- Major Martin Mettig, 15 July 1939 – 2 February 1940
- Hauptmann Fritz Ultsch, 3 February 1940 – 5 September 1940
- Oberleutnant Günther Scholz (acting), 6 September 1940 – 4 November 1940
- Hauptmann Arnold Lignitz, 4 November 1940 – 30 September 1941
- Hauptmann Reinhard Seiler, 1 October 1941 – 15 April 1943
- Hauptmann Siegfried Schnell, May 1943 – 11 February 1944
- Oberleutnant Rudolf Patzak (acting), February 1944 – 21 February 1944
- Hauptmann Rudolf Klemm (acting), February 1944 – March 1944
- Hauptmann Rudolf Sinner, March 1944 – 10 March 1944
- Major Reinhard Schroer, 14 March 1944 – 20 July 1944
- Hauptmann Robert Weiß, 21 July 1944 – 29 December 1944
- Oberleutnant Hans Dortenmann (acting), January 1945
- Oberleutnant Wilhelm Heilmann (acting), January 1945 – 14 February 1945
- Major Rudolf Klemm, 14 February 1945 – 25 February 1945

==== IV./JG 54 ====
- Hauptmann Erich Rudorffer, July 1943 – 30 July 1943
- Hauptmann Rudolf Sinner, August 1943 – 11 February 1944
- Hauptmann Siegfried Schnell, 11 February 1944 – 25 February 1944 †
- Hauptmann Gerhard Koall (acting), February 1944 – 26 May 1944
- Major Wolfgang Späte, May 1944 – 30 September 1944
- Hauptmann Rudolf Klemm, 1 October 1944 – 12 February 1945

== See also ==
- Organization of the Luftwaffe during World War II
