= Wolfgang Späte =

German World War II fighter pilot (1911–1997)

- Wolfgang Späte
- Born: 8 September 1911; Dresden, German Empire
- Died: 30 April 1997 (aged 85); Edewecht, Germany
- Military career
- Allegiance: Nazi Germany; West Germany
- Branch: German Army; Luftwaffe; German Air Force
- Service years: 1939–45; 1956–67
- Rank: Major (Wehrmacht); Oberstleutnant (Bundeswehr)
- Units: JG 54, JG 400, JG 7
- Conflicts: World War II
- Awards: Knight's Cross of the Iron Cross with Oak Leaves
- Other work: Bundeswehr

Wolfgang Späte (8 September 1911 – 30 April 1997) was a German Luftwaffe fighter ace during World War II, with 99 victories claimed. He was a recipient of the Knight's Cross of the Iron Cross with Oak Leaves. For fighter pilots it was a quantifiable measure of skill and combat success. He used an early version of the speed to fly theory to win the 1938 Rhön gliding competition flying a DFS Reiher. Already a talented glider pilot before the war, he went on to become one of the Luftwaffe's foremost test pilots.

== Early life and career ==
Späte was born on 8 September 1911 in Dresden, at the time in the Kingdom of Saxony of the German Empire. He studied at the Technische Universität Darmstadt and then became a test pilot with the Deutsche Forschungsanstalt für Segelflug (German Research Institute for Sailplane Flight').

== World War II ==
World War II in Europe began on Friday 1 September 1939 when German forces invaded Poland. During this invasion, Späte served with 2. Staffel (2nd squadron) of Heeres-Ergänzungs-Aufklärungsgruppe 23 (23rd army reconnaissance group), flying aerial reconnaissance missions, and received the Iron Cross 2nd Class (Eisernes Kreuz zweiter Klasse) on 8 November. Trained as a fighter pilot, he was posted to 5. Staffel of Jagdgeschwader 54 (JG 54—54th Fighter Wing) on 1 January 1941. The Staffel was headed by Oberleutnant Hubert Mütherich and subordinated to II. Gruppe (2nd group) of JG 54 commanded by Hauptmann Dietrich Hrabak. At the time, the Gruppe was based at Bonn-Hangelar Airfield at Sankt Augustin for a period of rest and replenishment following the losses sustained during the Battle of Britain.

On 29 March 1941, II. Gruppe of JG 54 was withdrawn from the English Channel and was ordered to Graz-Thalerhof. There the various squadrons were split up with 4. Staffel being subordinated to III. Gruppe of Jagdgeschwader 77 (JG 77—77th Fighter Wing) and ordered to Deta in Romania, becoming an element of Fliegerführer Arad. On 6 April, 4. Staffel flew combat missions in the Invasion of Yugoslavia. The next day, the Staffel flew combat air patrols on the Hungarian-Yugoslavian border. On 9 April, II./JG 54 was united again at Kecskemét, Hungary and returned to Deta on 11 April. The Gruppe was withdrawn from this theater on 19 April and ordered to an airfield at Zemun near Belgrade. In this theater of operations, Späte claimed his first aerial victory, a Yugoslav Bristol Blenheim bomber near Pécs in Hungary, on 7 April 1941.

=== War against the Soviet Union ===
Following the surrender of the Royal Yugoslav Army on 17 April 1941, JG 54 received orders on 3 May 1941 to turn over all Bf 109-Es so they could receive the new Bf 109-F variant. Transition training was completed at Airfield Stolp-Reitz in Pomerania. Following intensive training, the Geschwader was moved to airfields in Eastern Prussia. II. Gruppe under command of Hauptmann Hrabak was moved to Trakehnen on 20 June 1941. The Wehrmacht launched Operation Barbarossa, the invasion of the Soviet Union, on 22 June with II. Gruppe supporting Army Group North in its strategic goal towards Leningrad.

Victories came frequently, and he was awarded the Honour Goblet of the Luftwaffe (Ehrenpokal der Luftwaffe) on 9 August. On 10 September, Späte was appointed Staffelkapitän (squadron leader) of 5. Staffel of JG 54. He succeeded Mütherich who was killed in action the day before. On 2 October, Späte claimed three aerial victories in combat near Lake Ilmen. His third claim of the day was JG 54s 1,000th aerial victory claimed since the launch of Operation Barbarossa on 22 June. Then on 5 October, he became the 10th member of JG 54 to be awarded the Knight's Cross of the Iron Cross (Ritterkreuz des Eisernen Kreuzes), after reaching 45 victories.

His unit withdrew to the Reich at the end of the year for rest and refit, and Späte was promoted to Hauptmann on 1 January 1942. Success continued upon returning to the north of the Eastern Front as the Soviets desperately tried to raise the siege of Leningrad. This culminated with the award of the Knight's Cross of the Iron Cross with Oak Leaves (Ritterkreuz des Eisernen Kreuzes mit Eichenlaub) on 23 April 1942 when he had 72 victories. The presentation was made by Adolf Hitler at the Wolf's Lair, Hitler's headquarters in Rastenburg, present-day Kętrzyn in Poland. Also presented with awards that day by Hitler were Hauptmann Herbert Ihlefeld, who received the Swords to his Knight's Cross with Oak Leaves, and Oberleutnant Wolf-Dietrich Huy who was also honored with the Oak Leaves. However, with the award, he was ordered back to the Reich to set up a top-secret unit: Erprobungskommando 16, (EKdo 16) to test-fly the revolutionary new rocket-fighter, the Messerschmitt Me 163 "Komet". In consequence, command of 5. Staffel of JG 54 was passed on to Hauptmann Joachim Wandel on 21 April.

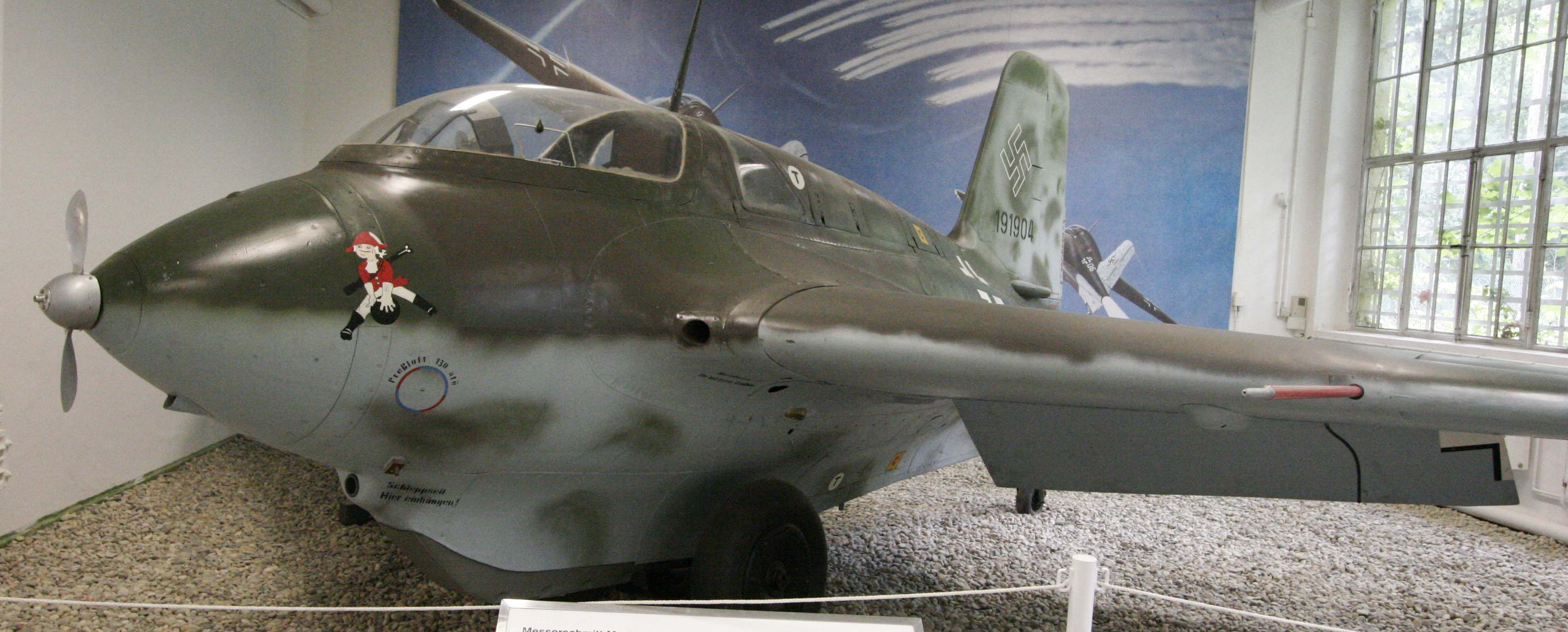
Messerschmitt Me 163 at the Luftwaffenmuseum in Berlin-Gatow

Späte took his first flight in the Me 163 on 8 May 1942. Over the next year testing continued and slowly specially chosen pilots joined EKdo 16. Side by side with the rocket-fighter project, was the test program of the Me 262 jet-fighter (under EKdo 262). On 17 April 1943, Späte became the first Luftwaffe pilot to fly the Messerschmitt Me 262 (Werknummer 2620000002—factory number) jet fighter. He was one of a select few pilots to have flown both ground-breaking aircraft.

After another year, the Me 163 was deemed combat-ready, and the testing program was wound down. Before he left for his new posting though, on 14 May 1944 he flew the first combat sortie for the Me 163. According to some sources, his Me 163 PK+QL was painted red, either in the factory or by ground crew, resembling Manfred von Richthofen's Fokker Dr.I. Although he flew the mission (without success, twice unable to intercept the enemy when the rocket engine failed), Späte was not amused after seeing the plane and ordered it to be re-painted.

=== Group commander ===
In May 1944, Späte was appointed Gruppenkommandeur (group commander) of IV. Gruppe of JG 54. He replaced Hauptmann Gerhard Koall who had temporarily been leading the Gruppe after its former commander Hauptmann Siegfried Schnell was killed in action on 25 February 1944.

His new unit was quickly recalled to Germany in June to cover the transfer of all the squadrons sent west following the D-day landings. There it was converted onto the Fw 190A-8 and then sent to Poland against the great Russian summer offensive. But against vastly greater numbers of enemy aircraft the unit was butchered, losing nearly half its pilots killed or wounded - Späte himself was injured and forced two times to bail out of his aircraft. The unit was pulled back again to the Reich for refit and rebuild. On 17 September, the Allied forces staged their airborne operation at Arnhem. Again, IV./JG 54 was thrown into the fray, but for the second time in less than 3 months, against vastly superior opposition, it was destroyed in less than a fortnight.

On 16 October, Späte was transferred to JG 400, transferring command of IV./JG 54 Hauptmann Rudolf Klemm. In his 4-month absence from the Me 163 programme, the first combat unit (I./JG 400) had been set up and he joined that unit to come back up to speed on the interceptor's progress (some sources say as the unit's commander, although Hauptmann Robert Olejnik is also given as the unit commander at this time).

=== Flying the Messerschmitt Me 262 ===
After JG 400 was disbanded, Späte joined the Geschwaderstab (headquarters unit) of Jagdgeschwader 7 (JG 7—7th Fighter Wing) in April 1945. On 15 April, JG 7 was ordered to relocate to airfields at Saaz, present-day Žatec, Eger and the Prague–Ruzyně Airport where it continued to fly missions in defense of Berlin. On 17 April, JG 7 was able to get 20 Me 262 airborne which intercepted Boeing B-17 Flying Fortress bombers near Dresden. In this encounter, Späte claimed a B-17 bomber shot down.

== Later life ==
Following World War II, Späte joined the German Air Force in 1956, at the time referred to as the Bundesluftwaffe of the Bundeswehr. He retired in 1967 with the rank of Oberstleutnant (lieutenant colonel) Späte died on 30 April 1997 at the age of 85 in Edewecht, Germany. On the night of 15/16 May 2005, his military awards and decoration on display at the Militärhistorisches Museum Flugplatz Berlin-Gatow, were stolen.

== Summary of career ==
=== Aerial victory claims ===
According to US historian David T. Zabecki, Späte was credited with 99 aerial victories. Spick also lists him with 99 aerial victories, claimed in over 600 combat missions, 90 of which on the Eastern Front and nine on the Western Front, including five four-engine bombers while flying the Me 262. Mathews and Foreman, authors of Luftwaffe Aces — Biographies and Victory Claims, researched the German Federal Archives and found records for 99 aerial victory claims, plus four further unconfirmed claims. This figure of confirmed claims includes 91 aerial victories on the Eastern Front and eight on the Western Front, including five four-engine bombers with the Me 262 jet fighter.

Victory claims were logged to a map-reference (PQ = Planquadrat), for example "PQ 25 Ost 84859". The Luftwaffe grid map (Jägermeldenetz) covered all of Europe, western Russia and North Africa and was composed of rectangles measuring 15 minutes of latitude by 30 minutes of longitude, an area of about 360 square miles (930 km^{2}). These sectors were then subdivided into 36 smaller units to give a location area 3 km × 4 km (1.9 mi × 2.5 mi) in size.

Chronicle of aerial victories
This and the ♠ (Ace of spades) indicates those aerial victories which made Späte an "ace-in-a-day", a term which designates a fighter pilot who has shot down five or more airplanes in a single day. This and the – (dash) indicates unconfirmed aerial victory claims for which Späte did not receive credit. This and the ? (question mark) indicates information discrepancies listed by Prien, Stemmer, Rodeike, Bock, Mathews and Foreman.
Claim	Date	Time	Type	Location	Claim	Date	Time	Type	Location
– 5. Staffel of Jagdgeschwader 54 – Balkan Campaign — 29 March – 3 May 1941
1	7 April 1941	12:00	Blenheim	Fünfkirchen					
– 5. Staffel of Jagdgeschwader 54 – Operation Barbarossa — 22 June – 5 December 1941
2	23 June 1941	10:07	SB-2	northeast of Insterburg	26	26 August 1941	05:45	I-16	east of Poretschje
3	23 June 1941	10:08	SB-2	northeast of Insterburg	27	26 August 1941	05:48	I-16	east of Poretschje
4	27 June 1941	13:35	SB-2	east of Dünaburg	28	3 September 1941	18:30	I-18 (MiG-1)	north of Michałówka
5	27 June 1941	13:50	SB-2	east of Dünaburg	29	9 September 1941	16:45	I-18 (MiG-1)	Leningrad
6	30 June 1941	06:47	DB-3	east of Kreuzburg	30	10 September 1941	11:20	I-18 (MiG-1)	south of Leningrad
7	30 June 1941	12:30	DB-3	north of Dünaburg	31	12 September 1941	13:00	I-18 (MiG-1)	north of Krasnoye Selo
8	30 June 1941	14:50	DB-3	west of Dünaburg	32	19 September 1941	09:20	I-18 (MiG-1)	northeast of Leningrad
9	2 July 1941	18:30	DB-3	east of Tschalkino	33	21 September 1941	11:50	I-18 (MiG-1)	south of Putilowo
10	6 July 1941	10:45	I-16	east-southeast of Pskov	34	21 September 1941	17:30	I-18 (MiG-1)	north of Wswelowshski
11	7 July 1941	18:55	DB-3	northeast of Ostrov	35	23 September 1941	08:40	I-16	northeast of Leningrad
12	8 July 1941	11:15	I-18 (MiG-1)	Porkhov	36	26 September 1941	08:35	I-18 (MiG-1)	Shicharjewo
13	17 July 1941	06:30	I-153	northwest of Soltsy	37	26 September 1941	11:20	I-18 (MiG-1)	north of Parogi
14	17 July 1941	20:30	DB-3	east of Lake Samra	38	27 September 1941	11:00	I-18 (MiG-1)	Ljubnitza
15	19 July 1941	17:30	DB-3	southwest of Mshinskaya	39	1 October 1941	17:00	I-18 (MiG-1)	Polnowo
16	19 July 1941	19:08	I-18 (MiG-1)	northeast of Wloschowo	40	1 October 1941	17:02	I-18 (MiG-1)	Polnowo
17	25 July 1941	07:58	DB-3	north of Werest	41	2 October 1941	08:00	I-18 (MiG-1)	Ljubnitza
18	7 August 1941	19:48	I-18 (MiG-1)	west of Korpowa	42	2 October 1941	08:12	I-18 (MiG-1)	east of Valday
19	7 August 1941	19:51	I-18 (MiG-1)	north of Korpowa	43	2 October 1941	14:30	I-18 (MiG-1)	east of Lake Seliger
20	10 August 1941	10:11	I-18 (MiG-1)	northeast of Poretschje	44	2 October 1941	14:35	I-18 (MiG-1)	east of Lake Seliger
21	11 August 1941	06:07	I-16	northeast of Poretschje	45	5 October 1941	08:10	I-16	southeast of Valday
22	12 August 1941	17:50	I-18 (MiG-1)	Kiepiek	46	7 October 1941	07:22	I-26 (Yak-1)	southeast of Borowitschi
23	16 August 1941	19:00	I-18 (MiG-1)	northeast of Krasnogvardeysky	47	7 October 1941	17:10	I-18 (MiG-1)	northeast of Kresttsy
24	21 August 1941	12:57	I-18 (MiG-1)	northeast of Pushkin	48	10 October 1941	10:17	I-26 (Yak-1)	Jam Chotilowo
25	25 August 1941	13:40	I-153	Kuplja					
– 5. Staffel of Jagdgeschwader 54 – Eastern Front — 6 December 1941 – 21 April 1942
49	3 February 1942	15:02	Pe-2	Ulyanovka	65	26 March 1942	13:25	P-40	
50	7 February 1942	08:50	Pe-2	Szenaja Kjerjest	66	28 March 1942	15:30	I-301 (LaGG-3)	
51	10 February 1942	16:40	R-5	south-southeast of Chudovo	67	1 April 1942	10:55	I-18 (MiG-1)	
52	15 February 1942	15:05	I-26 (Yak-1)	north of Wolchowstroj	68	1 April 1942	11:35	I-26 (Yak-1)	
53	22 February 1942	10:45	biplane with skids (Seversky)	Dubrovka	69	1 April 1942	15:15	Il-2	
54	28 February 1942	08:30	Pe-2	southwest of Tikhvin	70♠	5 April 1942	11:47	I-26 (Yak-1)	1 km (0.62 mi) north of Valday
55	7 March 1942	15:40	R-5	east of Kholm	♠ (Note: This claim is not listed by Mathews and Foreman.)	5 April 1942	11:47	I-26	1 km (0.62 mi) north of Valday
56	13 March 1942	14:10	I-18 (MiG-1)	west of Malaya Vishera	71♠	5 April 1942	13:10	I-18 (MiG-1)	
57♠	16 March 1942	06:33	biplane (Seversky)	Bolotowo	72♠	5 April 1942	13:41	I-18 (MiG-1)	
58♠	16 March 1942	06:45	biplane (Seversky)	Narostynia	73♠	5 April 1942	13:43	I-18 (MiG-1)	
59♠	16 March 1942	06:45	biplane (Seversky)	Narostynia	74	15 April 1942	06:30	MiG-3	
60♠	16 March 1942	14:38	I-18 (MiG-1)	Myasnoy Bor southwest of Gladi	75	16 April 1942	06:35	LaGG-3	
61♠	16 March 1942	17:15	I-18 (MiG-1)	Gremjatschewo forest, south of Lyubyan	76	16 April 1942	08:10	Pe-2	north of Maljutischij
62	17 March 1942	13:20	I-26 (Yak-1)	Pogostje	77	16 April 1942	08:15	Pe-2	20 km (12 mi) northwest of Dworjetz
63	18 March 1942	12:55? (Note: According to Mathews and Foreman claimed at 17:15.)	I-61 (MiG-3)	east of Spasskaja Polist	78	17 April 1942	13:50	Yak-1	
64	26 March 1942	13:22	P-40? (Note: According to Mathews and Foreman claimed as a Mikoyan-Gurevich MiG-1.)						
– Stab II. Gruppe of Jagdgeschwader 54 – Eastern Front — July 1942
—	7 July 1942	—	U-2	vicinity of Demyansk	—	7 July 1942	—	U-2	vicinity of Demyansk
—	7 July 1942	—	U-2	vicinity of Demyansk	79? (Note: According to Mathews and Foreman this claim was unconfirmed.)	13 July 1942	15:20	R-5	east of Jam Simorgoje
– Stab IV. Gruppe of Jagdgeschwader 54 – Eastern Front — June – August 1944
79	28 June 1944	19:15	La-5	PQ 25 Ost 84859	86	22 July 1944	15:25	Boston	PQ 25 Ost 3259
80	8 July 1944	17:46	Il-2	PQ 25 Ost 4275	87	26 July 1944	16:45	Il-2	Kholm
81	15 July 1944	13:40	La-5	PQ 26 Ost 5018	88	4 August 1944	18:25	unknown	PQ 25 Ost 1233
82	15 July 1944	13:50	La-5	PQ 26 Ost 5014	89	9 August 1944	16:40	Il-2	PQ 25 Ost 12156; 20 km (12 mi) east of Grojec
83	15 July 1944	14:00	La-5	PQ 26 Ost 5012	90	12 August 1944	11:00	La-5	PQ 25 Ost 12427; 25 km (16 mi) east-southeast of Grojec
84	16 July 1944	09:30	P-40	PQ 26 Ost 40292; Gulf of Finland, north-northeast of Reval	91	26 August 1944	12:36	Yak-9	PQ 25 Ost 13385; 25 km (16 mi) east-southeast of Nasielsk
85	20 July 1944	15:30	Yak-9	PQ 25 Ost 32772; 20 km (12 mi) northwest of Kholm	92	26 August 1944	18:55	La-5	PQ 25 Ost 14848 vicinity of Ostrołęka
– Stab IV. Gruppe of Jagdgeschwader 54 – Western Front — September 1944
93	25 September 1944	18:02	B-25	Arnhem	94	26 September 1944	14:20	Spitfire	east of Arnhem
– Stab I. Gruppe of Jagdgeschwader 7 –
95	17 April 1945	—	B-17	vicinity of Dresden	98	25 April 1945	—	B-17	southwest of Prague
96	19 April 1945	12:15	B-17	vicinity of Aussig	99	25 April 1945	—	B-17	southwest of Prague
97	25 April 1945	—	B-17	southwest of Prague					

=== Awards ===
- Iron Cross (1939)
  - 2nd Class (8 November 1939)
  - 1st Class (27 June 1940)
- Honour Goblet of the Luftwaffe (9 August 1941)
- German Cross in Gold on 9 December 1941 as Oberleutnant in the II./Jagdgeschwader 54
- Knight's Cross of the Iron Cross with Oak Leaves
  - Knight's Cross on 5 October 1941 as Oberleutnant of the Reserves and pilot in the 5./Jagdgeschwader 54
  - 90th Oak Leaves on 23 April 1942 as Oberleutnant of the Reserves and Staffelkapitän of the 5./Jagdgeschwader 54
