= Jagdgeschwader 21 =

Nazi fighter wing

Fighter Wing 21
- Jagdgeschwader 21
- Active: 1939–1940
- Country: Nazi Germany
- Branch: Luftwaffe
- Garrison/HQ: Döberitz
- Battle honours: Poland; France

Jagdgeschwader 21 was a fighter wing of Nazi Germany's Luftwaffe in World War II. It was formed on 15 July 1939 from personnel and equipment from I./Jagdgeschwader 1.

== Bibliography ==
- Mombeek, Eric; Smith, J. Richard & Creek, Eddie J. (1999). Jagdwaffe: Blitzkrieg and Sitzkrieg: Poland and France 1939–1940. Luftwaffe Colours. Vol. 1, Section 3. Classic Publications. ISBN 0-95-268677-5.
- Tessin, Georg (1980). Verbände und Truppen der deutschen Wehrmacht und Waffen-SS im Zweiten Weltkrieg 1939-1945. Vol. 14: Die Landstreitkräfte: Namensverbände / Die Luftstreitkräfte: (Fliegende Verbände) / Flakeinsatz im Reich 1943–1945. Osnabrück: Biblio. ISBN 3764811110.
