= Ulrich Wernitz =

German World War II flying ace (1921–1980)

- Wernitz as a Leutnant
- Born: 21 January 1921; Schweinitz/Herzberg, Germany
- Died: 23 December 1980 (aged 59); Fürstenfeldbruck, West Germany
- Military career
- Allegiance: Nazi Germany (to 1945); West Germany
- Branch: Luftwaffe; German Air Force
- Rank: Leutnant (Wehrmacht); Oberstleutnant (Bundeswehr)
- Nickname: Pipifax
- Unit: JG 54
- Commands: 3./JG 54
- Conflicts: See battles World War II: Eastern Front; Siege of Leningrad; Courland Pocket
- Awards: Knight's Cross of the Iron Cross

Ulrich Wernitz (21 January 1921 – 23 December 1980) was a Luftwaffe flying ace of World War II. He was credited with 101 aerial victories—that is, 101 aerial combat encounters resulting in the destruction of the enemy aircraft—claimed in roughly 240 combat missions. He served in the post World War II German Air Force of the Federal Republic of Germany, retiring with the rank of Oberstleutnant (Lieutenant Colonel).

== Early life and career ==
Wernitz, nicknamed Pipifax (nonsense), was born on 21 January 1921 in Schweinitz/Herzberg in the district of Wittenberg, a Province of Saxony. He joined the Luftwaffe in late 1941 and following flight training, (Note: Flight training in the Luftwaffe progressed through the levels A1, A2 and B1, B2, referred to as A/B flight training. A training included theoretical and practical training in aerobatics, navigation, long-distance flights and dead-stick landings. The B courses included high-altitude flights, instrument flights, night landings and training to handle the aircraft in difficult situations.) he was posted to 3. Staffel (3rd squadron) of Jagdgeschwader 54 (JG 54—54th Fighter Wing) in April 1943. The Staffel was commanded by Oberleutnant Franz Eisenach and subordinated to I. Gruppe (1st group) of JG 54 under command of Major Reinhard Seiler, flying the Focke-Wulf Fw 190. Seiler had just replaced Hauptmann Gerhard Koall who temporarily led the Gruppe after Major Hans Philipp was transferred to take command of Jagdgeschwader 1 (JG 1—1st Fighter Wing) fighting in Defence of the Reich.

== World War II ==
World War II in Europe had begun on Friday, 1 September 1939 when German forces invaded Poland. In June 1941, German forces had launched Operation Barbarossa, the invasion of the Soviet Union. In April 1943, I. Gruppe of JG 54 was based at Krasnogvardeysk, present-day Gatchina, located approximately 45 kilometers (28 mi) south-south-west of Leningrad on the northern sector of the Eastern Front. Here on 2 May, Wernitz claimed his first aerial victory on his second combat mission to date. In support of 18th Army during the Siege of Leningrad, a Rotte, a flight of two aircraft, from 3. Staffel was scrambled shortly before 17:00 and intercepted a formation of Lavochkin La-5 fighter aircraft near Pushkin. In this encounter, Wernitz claimed a La-5 shot down. At the time, he flew as wingman of Günther Scheel.

=== With the Geschwaderstab of JG 54 ===
In early June 1943, Wernitz was transferred the Geschwaderstab (headquarters unit) of JG 54, where he served on the staff of the Geschwaderkommodore (wing commander), initially und command of Oberstleutnant Hannes Trautloft and then Major Hubertus von Bonin. Based at Ziverskaya, Wernitz claimed his first aerial victory while flying with the Geschwaderstab on 1 June when he shot down a Yakovlev Yak-1 fighter. During this assignment, Wernitz frequently flew combat missions as wingman to Hermann Schleinhege.

On 5 July, German forces had launched Operation Citadel, the failed attempt to eliminate the Kursk salient that initiated the Battle of Kursk. In support of this offensive, JG 54 moved to Oryol on 9 July, fighting on the northern pincer of Generaloberst Walter Model's 9th Army. Here Wernitz claimed two Yakovlev Yak-9 fighters shot down on 16 July and another Yak-9 the following day. On 23 July, he was credited with the destruction of an Ilyushin Il-2 ground-attack aircraft. The air element of the Geschwaderstab returned to Ziverskaya on 25 July. Wernitz claimed his last aerial victory, and tenth in total, while flying with the Geschwaderstab on 1 August. By October, he had been awarded both classes of the Iron Cross (Eisernes Kreuz).

=== On the Eastern Front ===
In September 1943, Wernitz was transferred again to 3. Staffel, which was still under command of Eisenach. Command of I. Gruppe had been transferred to Hauptmann Walter Nowotny which was then based at the airbase Schatalowka, present-day Shatalovo air base, 40 kilometers (25 miles) southeast of Smolensk. Here, Wernitz claimed a Lavochkin-Gorbunov-Gudkov LaGG-3 fighter shot down on 15 September. Two days later, the Gruppe moved to Vitebsk. On combat missions, he frequently flew as wingman to Otto Kittel.

On 22 June 1940, Soviet forces launched Operation Bagration, the offensive which shattered the German front line on the Eastern Front, leading to the subsequent isolation of 300,000 German soldiers in the Courland Pocket. In consequence, I. Gruppe relocated to Polotsk, located approximately 95 kilometers (59 miles) northwest of Vitebsk. Here, the Gruppe supported the German forces fighting on the left wing of Army Group Centre. Two days later, Wernitz became an "ace-in-a-day" for the first time when he claimed two Yak-9 fighters, two Il-2 ground-attack aircraft and a single Bell P-39 Airacobra fighter shot down.

On 2 August, I. Gruppe moved to an makeshift airfield at Šķirotava, located approximately 10 kilometers (6.2 miles) southeast of Riga. Here on 28 August, Wernitz claimed his 82nd aerial victory, a Petlyakov Pe-2 shot down. He then fell ill in September. During his convalescence, Wernitz, was awarded the Knight's Cross of the Iron Cross (Ritterkreuz des Eisernen Kreuzes) on 29 October 1944 for 82 aerial victories claimed. On 1 January 1945, Wernitz also received the German Cross in Gold (Deutsches Kreuz in Gold).

He returned to his unit in early February 1945, which at the time was fighting in the Courland Pocket. He was then appointed Staffelführer (squadron leader) of 3. Staffel of JG 54 and claimed 19 further aerial victories, including eight on 8 March 1945. On 26 March 1945, Wernitz was credited with his 100th aerial victory. He was the 100th Luftwaffe pilot to achieve the century mark.

== Later life ==
Following World War II, Wernitz served in the German Air Force of the Federal Republic of Germany, retiring with the rank of Oberstleutnant (Lieutenant Colonel). He died on 23 December 1980.

== Summary of career ==
=== Aerial victory claims ===
According to US historian David T. Zabecki, Wernitz was credited with 101 aerial victories. Spick also lists him with the same number of aerial victories claimed in approximately 240 combat missions and a mission-to-claim ratio of 2.38. Mathews and Foreman, authors of Luftwaffe Aces — Biographies and Victory Claims, researched the German Federal Archives and state that Wernitz was credited with 101 aerial victories, all of which claimed on the Eastern Front.

Victory claims were logged to a map-reference (PQ = Planquadrat), for example "PQ 36 Ost 00333". The Luftwaffe grid map (Jägermeldenetz) covered all of Europe, western Russia and North Africa and was composed of rectangles measuring 15 minutes of latitude by 30 minutes of longitude, an area of about 360 square miles (930 km^{2}). These sectors were then subdivided into 36 smaller units to give a location area 3 km × 4 km (1.9 mi × 2.5 mi) in size.

Chronicle of aerial victories
This and the ♠ (Ace of spades) indicates those aerial victories which made Wernitz an "ace-in-a-day", a term which designates a fighter pilot who has shot down five or more airplanes in a single day. This and the – (dash) indicates unconfirmed aerial victory claims for which Wernitz did not receive credit. This and the ? (question mark) indicates information discrepancies listed by Prien, Stemmer, Rodeike, Balke, Bock, Mathews and Foreman.
Claim	Date	Time	Type	Location	Claim	Date	Time	Type	Location
– 3. Staffel of Jagdgeschwader 54 –
1	2 May 1943	16:56	La-5	PQ 36 Ost 00333 vicinity of Pushkin	3	24 May 1943	18:53	P-40	PQ 36 Ost 10184 east of Mga
2	21 May 1943	19:07	La-5	PQ 36 Ost 10464; 45 km (28 mi) northeast of Luban					
– Stab of Jagdgeschwader 54 –
4	1 June 1943	04:58	Yak-1	PQ 36 Ost 10293; 30 km (19 mi) southwest of Volkhov	8	17 July 1943	03:55	Yak-9	PQ 35 Ost 54121; 20 km (12 mi) south-southwest of Sukhinichi
5	18 June 1943	06:28	LaGG-3	PQ 36 Ost 21753; 20 km (12 mi) north-northwest of Volkhov	9	23 July 1943	08:55	Il-2	PQ 35 Ost 54333; 45 km (28 mi) east-southeast of Zhizdra
6	16 July 1943	07:54	Yak-9	PQ 35 Ost 54487; 20 km (12 mi) northwest of Bolkhov	10	1 August 1943	11:22	La-5	PQ 36 Ost 10183 east of Mga
7	16 July 1943	08:03	Yak-9	PQ 35 Ost 54498; 25 km (16 mi) west-northwest of Bolkhov					
– 3. Staffel of Jagdgeschwader 54 –
11? (Note: This claim is not listed by Mathews and Foreman.)	15 September 1943	16:15	LaGG-3	PQ 35 Ost 35341, Satki	52	17 July 1944	17:11	Pe-2	PQ OP-7/4
12	9 October 1943	06:55	LaGG-3	PQ 35 Ost 07743; 10 km (6.2 mi) northeast of Nevel	53	17 July 1944	17:14	Pe-2	PQ OP-5/7
13	9 October 1943	06:59	LaGG-3	PQ 35 Ost 07751; 10 km (6.2 mi) northeast of Nevel	54	21 July 1944	14:40	Yak-9	PQ ON-5/5
14	9 October 1943	07:00	Yak-9	PQ 35 Ost 07753; 10 km (6.2 mi) northeast of Nevel	55	21 July 1944	19:15	Yak-9	PQ NM-4/6
15	12 October 1943	10:55	La-5	PQ 35 Ost 15943	56	21 July 1944	19:17	Yak-9	PQ OM-2/4
16	13 October 1943	08:43	Yak-9	PQ 35 Ost 15561; 20 km (12 mi) south of Krassnji	57	21 July 1944	19:21	Yak-9	PQ OM-5/2
17	20 October 1943	09:14	Yak-9	PQ 35 Ost 06163, Lake Ssennitza	58	27 July 1944	14:50	La-5	PQ NL-8/2
18	22 October 1943	08:15	La-5	PQ 35 Ost 15342, north of Gorki	59	27 July 1944	14:52	La-5	PQ NL-8/3
19	15 December 1943	09:08	Il-2	PQ 35 Ost 06167	60	27 July 1944	14:53	La-5	PQ NL-8/9
20	1 January 1944	12:55	Il-2	PQ 35 Ost 06794	61	1 August 1944	11:01	La-5	PQ KH-2/8
21	6 January 1944	10:43	Yak-9	PQ 35 Ost 05151	62	1 August 1944	11:06	La-5	PQ KH-7/9
22	8 January 1944	09:30	Yak-9	PQ 25 Ost 96684; 25 km (16 mi) southwest of Gorodok	63	1 August 1944	11:10	La-5	PQ LH-4/5
23	15 January 1944	12:26	La-5	PQ 35 Ost 05161	64	1 August 1944	19:45	La-5	PQ KG-9/5
24	7 February 1944	07:50	La-5	PQ 35 Ost 06784	65	5 August 1944	14:42	Il-2	PQ LN-2/3
25	30 March 1944	12:32	Yak-9	PQ 26 Ost 70694; 15 km (9.3 mi) southwest of Narva	66	5 August 1944	14:47	Il-2	PQ LN-3/7
26	30 March 1944	15:26? (Note: According to Mathews and Foreman claimed at 15:22.)	La-5	PQ 26 Ost 70352; Baltic Sea, 35 km (22 mi) northeast of Kunda	67	7 August 1944	16:11	P-39	PQ KN-4/1
27	2 April 1944	11:45	Il-2	PQ 26 Ost 60462 northeast of Kunda	68	15 August 1944	09:11	Yak-9	PQ LJ-9/3
28	4 April 1944	09:52	Yak-9	PQ 26 Ost 6044 northeast of Kunda	69	15 August 1944	09:13	Yak-9	PQ LJ-7/4
29	19 April 1944	09:25	Il-2	PQ 26 Ost 70693; 15 km (9.3 mi) southwest of Narva	70	15 August 1944	09:22	Yak-9	PQ LJ-3/4
30	8 May 1944	14:01	P-40	PQ 26 Ost 70313; Baltic Sea, 35 km (22 mi) east-northeast of Kunda	71	15 August 1944	13:32	P-39	PQ LK-4/5
31	8 May 1944	14:03	Yak-9	PQ 26 Ost 70331; Gulf of Finland, north of Hungerburg	72	16 August 1944	10:11	Il-2	PQ LK-5/8
32	16 May 1944	10:20	Yak-9	PQ 26 Ost 70523; Baltic Sea, 45 km (28 mi) west of Hungerburg	73	16 August 1944	10:13	Il-2	PQ LK-8/2
33	28 May 1944	08:42	LaGG-3	PQ 26 Ost 70693; 15 km (9.3 mi) southwest of Narva	74	23 August 1944	11:09	Il-2	PQ JN-5/3
34	29 May 1944	10:06	La-5	PQ 26 Ost 60412; In Gulf of Finland	75	24 August 1944	17:41	La-5	PQ JG-6/5
35	29 May 1944	10:11	Yak-9	PQ 26 Ost 60432 northeast of Kunda	76	25 August 1944	12:46	Yak-9	PQ LG-7/1
36	29 May 1944	10:18	Yak-9	PQ 26 Ost 70452; Baltic Sea, 25 km (16 mi) northwest of Hungerburg	77	25 August 1944	12:47	La-5	PQ LG-4/9
37	30 May 1944	21:11	Yak-9	PQ 26 Ost 70433; Baltic Sea, 25 km (16 mi) north-northwest of Hungerburg	78	25 August 1944	12:49	Yak-9	PQ KG-4/5
38	15 June 1944	07:10	Yak-9	PQ SP-3/3	79	28 August 1944	11:26? (Note: According to Mathews and Foreman claimed at 10:26. The authors Prien, Stemmer, Balke and Bock state that files held by the German Federal Archives contain a documentation error as the report filed by Wernitz states 11:26.)	Yak-9	PQ JM-5/4; 40 km (25 mi) north-northwest of Kreuzburg
39	15 June 1944	07:15	Yak-9	PQ RP-9/4	80	28 August 1944	11:28? (Note: According to Mathews and Foreman claimed at 10:28.)	Pe-2	PQ JM-9/1; 30 km (19 mi) north of Kreuzburg
40	15 June 1944	07:18	La-5	PQ RP-7/2	81	28 August 1944	15:50? (Note: According to Mathews and Foreman claimed at 11:28 over a Petlyakov Pe-2.)	P-39	PQ LG-6/1
41	15 June 1944	07:25	Il-2	PQ SP-6/2	82	28 August 1944	16:12? (Note: According to Mathews and Foreman claimed at 16:11.)	P-39	PQ LG-2/2
42	28 June 1944	12:10	LaGG-3	PQ QT-8/4	— (Note: This unconfirmed claim is not listed by Mathews and Foreman.)	28 August 1944	—	Yak-9	
43	28 June 1944	19:22	P-39	PQ QT-3/2	♠	5 March 1945	—	unknown	
44♠	30 June 1944	15:02	Yak-9	PQ PS-7/3	♠	5 March 1945	—	unknown	
45♠	30 June 1944	16:01? (Note: According to Mathews and Foreman claimed at 16:01.)	Yak-9	PQ OS-5/3	♠	5 March 1945	—	unknown	
46♠	30 June 1944	16:10	Il-2	PQ OT-1/4	♠	5 March 1945	—	unknown	
47♠	30 June 1944	16:14	P-39	PQ OT-2/1	♠	5 March 1945	—	unknown	
48♠	30 June 1944	19:48	Il-2	PQ PS-5/8	♠	5 March 1945	—	unknown	
49	3 July 1944	11:38	P-39	PQ OS-7/7	♠	5 March 1945	—	unknown	
50	3 July 1944	11:46	P-39	PQ OS-5/7	♠	5 March 1945	—	unknown	
51	16 July 1944	05:13	P-39	PQ OO-3/4	100	26 March 1945	—	unknown	

=== Awards ===
- Iron Cross (1939) 2nd and 1st Class
- Honor Goblet of the Luftwaffe on 17 April 1944 as Feldwebel and pilot
- Knight's Cross of the Iron Cross on 29 October 1944 as Feldwebel in the 4./Jagdgeschwader 54 (Note: According to Scherzer as pilot in the I./Jagdgeschwader 54.)
- German Cross in Gold on 1 January 1945 as Feldwebel in the 3./Jagdgeschwader 54
