= Robert Weiß (pilot) =

German fighter pilot (1920–1944)

- Weiß in 1944
- Born: 21 April 1920; Baden bei Wien, Austria
- Died: 29 December 1944 (aged 24) near Lengerich, Nazi Germany
- Cause of death: Killed in action
- Burial place: Helenen cemetery in Baden bei Wien
- Military career
- Allegiance: Nazi Germany
- Branch: Luftwaffe
- Service years: 1939–1944
- Rank: Hauptmann (captain)
- Nickname: "Bazi"
- Units: JG 26, JG 54
- Commands: 1., 3., 8. and 10./JG 54, III./JG 54
- Conflicts: See battles World War II: Eastern Front; Western Front Defense of the Reich
- Awards: Knight's Cross of the Iron Cross with Oak Leaves

Robert "Bazi" Weiß (21 April 1920 – 29 December 1944) was an Austrian-born Luftwaffe fighter pilot during World War II. As a fighter ace, he was credited with 121 aerial victories claimed in more than 471 combat missions. Weiß claimed the majority of his victories over the Eastern Front, and 26 over the Western Allies, including three four-engined heavy bombers.

Born in Baden bei Wien, Weiß joined the military service in the Luftwaffe in 1939, initially serving with the anti-aircraft artillery. He was then accepted for pilot training and was then posted to Jagdgeschwader 26 (JG 26—26th Fighter Wing) in early 1941. Fighting on the English Channel, he claimed his first aerial victory on 21 September 1941. In September 1942, Weiß was transferred to Jagdgeschwader 54 (JG 54—54th Fighter Wing) which was fighting on the Eastern Front. In July 1943, Weiß was made a Staffelkapitän (squadron leader), first of 3. Staffel (3rd squadron) of JG 54, then of 1. and 10. Staffel and was awarded the Knight's Cross of the Iron Cross in March 1944. In June, he was appointed Gruppenkommandeur (group commander) of III. Gruppe (3rd group) of JG 54. He was killed in action on 29 December 1944 during the aerial battles of the Battle of the Bulge, shot down near Lengerich. Posthumously, Weiß was awarded the Knight's Cross of the Iron Cross with Oak Leaves on 12 March 1945.

== Early life and career ==
Weiß was born on 21 April 1920 in Baden bei Wien, Austria. He was the oldest son of a higher city secretary (Stadtobersekretär), a public servant, and police commissioner (Polizei-Inspektor). Following four years of schooling at a Volksschule (compulsory education) in Baden, he attended the Bundesgymnasium (secondary education) since 3 September 1930, graduating with his Matura (maturity diploma) in 1938. In early 1939, he volunteered for military service with the Luftwaffe as an officer cadet, serving with Flak-Regiment 22, an anti-aircraft artillery regiment based at Döberitz.

== World War II ==
World War II in Europe began on Friday 1 September 1939 when German forces invaded Poland. For the invasion, Flak-Regiment 22 was subordinated to the 3. leichte Division (3rd Light Division). Following this campaign, Weiß was trained as a fighter pilot, (Note: Flight training in the Luftwaffe progressed through the levels A1, A2 and B1, B2, referred to as A/B flight training. A training included theoretical and practical training in aerobatics, navigation, long-distance flights and dead-stick landings. The B courses included high-altitude flights, instrument flights, night landings and training to handle the aircraft in difficult situations.) and was posted to 6. Staffel (6th squadron) of Jagdgeschwader 26 (JG 26—26th Fighter Wing) on 1 January 1941. On 1 April, he was promoted to Leutnant (second lieutenant).

Fighting against the Royal Air Force (RAF) on the English Channel, Weiß claimed his first aerial victory on 21 September. That day, RAF Fighter Command flew "Circus" No. 101 consisting of twelve Bristol Blenheim bombers and escorted by fourteen squadrons of Supermarine Spitfire and Hawker Hurricane fighters which targeted Béthune and Gosnay. In combat over Étaples and 5 kilometers (3.1 miles) northwest of Berck, Weiß managed to shoot down a No. 315 Polish Fighter Squadron Spitfire at 16:25, his first aerial victory. On 9 March 1942, the RAF sent six Douglas A-20 Havoc bombers of "Circus" No. 113 to the power station at Gosnay. Defending against this attack, Weiß claimed a Spitfire shot down 4 kilometers (2.5 miles) west of Boulogne. On 31 May, RAF Fighter Command sent several "Rodeos" to France. II. Gruppe intercepted several Spitfires over the Abbeville-Drucat Airfield where Weiß shot down a Spitfire of the Royal New Zealand Air Force No. 485 Squadron. In September 1942, Weiß was transferred to 1. Staffel of Jagdgeschwader 54 (JG 54—54th Fighter Wing) which was based on the Eastern Front.

=== Eastern Front ===
In September 1942, 1. Staffel of JG 54 was commanded by Oberleutnant Heinz Lange and part of I. Gruppe, which was headed by Hauptmann Hans Philipp. The Gruppe was based at Krasnogvardeysk and was fighting in the siege of Leningrad. Weiß claimed his first aerial victories on the Eastern Front on 12 January 1943 when Soviet forces launched Operation Iskra which created a land connection to Leningrad. That day, Weiß claimed two Ilyushin Il-2 ground-attack aircraft shot down. On 1 March, Weiß was promoted to Oberleutnant (first lieutenant). Then fighting and flying with 3. Staffel in the combat area of Leningrad, Weiß claimed his 31st aerial victory on 13 April when he shot down a Soviet Petlyakov Pe-2 bomber making an attack on the Luftwaffe airfield at Krasnogvardeysk. Falling ill in May 1943, he was hospitalized until July 1943. During his convalescence, Weiß was awarded the Honor Goblet of the Luftwaffe (Ehrenpokal der Luftwaffe) on 8 May.

After Oberleutnant Franz Eisenach was wounded in combat on 8 July, Weiß temporarily replaced him as Staffelkapitän (squadron leader) of 3. Staffel of JG 54 until his return on 15 September 1943. On 12 July, Weiß was awarded the German Cross in Gold (Deutsches Kreuz in Gold). (Note: According to Obermaier on 2 August 1943.) On 20 July, I. Gruppe relocated to an Karachev during the Battle of Kursk. Weiß claimed two Il-2 ground-attack aircraft destroyed, his first aerial victories following his return to combat operations, on 2 August while supporting German troops retreating northwest of Orel and southwest of Kromy. On 15 September, Weiß was temporarily given command of 1. Staffel, replacing Oberleutnant Otto Vinzent who had stepped in for Oberleutnant Walter Nowotny after Nowotny had been put in command of I. Gruppe. On 28 September, Weiß was transferred to IV. Gruppe where was made Staffelkapitän of 10. Staffel of JG 54. He replaced Oberleutnant Alfred Teumer who had been wounded in aerial combat on 3 September. Command of 1. Staffel was then passed to Oberleutnant Kurt Fischer. On 11 September, Weiß made an emergency landing in his Focke-Wulf Fw 190 A-6 (Werknummer 530 337—factory number) at Shatalovka following aerial combat. On 15 February 1944, Weiß claimed his last aerial victories on the Eastern Front when he shot down four Il-2 ground-attack aircraft in support of 16th Army fighting in the combat area near Luga. Two days later, he left IV. Gruppe, handing over command of 10. Staffel to Oberleutnant Paul-Rudolf Deterra. Weiß had telegraphed his fiancée, that for the four weeks he would be rehabilitating at a clinic in Oberschreiberhau, present-day Szklarska Poręba, near Hirschberg, present-day Jelenia Góra in Poland.

=== Western Front and death ===
While Weiß was recovering at Oberschreiberhau, the commander of 10. Staffel of JG 54 was killed in action on 21 February 1944. In consequence, Weiß was became Staffelkapitän of 10. Staffel. The Staffel was subordinated to III. Gruppe of JG 54 and was based at Ludwigslust, fighting in defense of the Reich against the Western Allies. Weiß, who had been nominated for the Knight's Cross of the Iron Cross (Ritterkreuz des Eisernen Kreuzes) while serving with 3. Staffel of JG 54, received the award on 26 March 1944. On 20 April, III. Gruppe relocated to Landau an der Isar. Here Weiß claimed his first aerial victory with III. Gruppe on 19 May when he shot down a United States Army Air Forces (USAAF) Lockheed P-38 Lightning southeast of Oschersleben. On 27 May, Weiß claimed his first heavy bomber when he shot down a Boeing B-17 Flying Fortress northwest of Colmar.

On 6 June 1944, Weiß was temporarily appointed Gruppenkommandeur (group commander) of III. Gruppe (3rd group) of JG 54. On 21 June, he officially succeeded Major Werner Schröer, who had been transferred. Command of 8. Staffel then went to Leutnant Alfred Gross. Weiß was promoted to Hauptmann (captain) on 1 July 1944. At the time, the Gruppe was based at Vélizy – Villacoublay Air Base, France on the Western Front and fought in German retreat following the Invasion of Normandy. The Gruppe was withdrawn from combat operations on 5 September, relocating to Oldenburg Airfield (Gruppenstab, 9. and 12. Staffel) and Varrelbusch Airfield (10. and 11. Staffel), where it became the first unit to receive the new Fw 190 D-9. On 28 September, Weiß was credited with the destruction of a Spitfire fighter, his 119th victory claim. His opponent was Flight Lieutenant Duncan McCuaig from the RAF No. 541 Squadron, a photographic reconnaissance squadron.

III. Gruppe became fully operational on 25 December with all three squadrons uniting at Varrelbusch Airfield. On 27 December, III. Gruppe fought Hawker Tempest fighters from the No. 486 Squadron, a New Zealand fighter squadron of the RAF. In this encounter, III. Gruppe lost five aircraft for one victory claimed. On 29 December, Weiß led his Gruppe in combat against Allied fighters of the RAF Second Tactical Air Force. Vectored by ground control to the Münster-Rheine area, the engagement ended with the destruction of 15 fighters, plus two further damaged, 13 pilots killed and two wounded. In return III. Gruppe claimed eight aircraft shot down. Weiß was one of the pilots killed, he was shot down in his Fw 190 D-9 (Werknummer 210 060) "Black 10" near Lengerich. His victor was Flight Sergeant K. F. Haanes of the RAF No. 331 Squadron, a Norwegian squadron. He was posthumously awarded the Knight's Cross of the Iron Cross with Oak Leaves (Ritterkreuz des Eisernen Kreuzes mit Eichenlaub) on 12 March 1945, the 782nd officer or soldier of the Wehrmacht so honored. Initially he was interred on the new cemetery in Lingen. In 1958, his remains were moved and reinterred to the war cemetery at Baden bei Wien and again moved to the Helenen cemetery where he now rests in a family grave. He was replaced by Oberleutnant Hans Dortenmann as commander of III. Gruppe of JG 54.

== Summary of career ==
=== Aerial victory claims ===
According to US historian David T. Zabecki, Weiß was credited with 121 aerial victories. Obermaier also lists Weiß with 121 aerial victories in claimed 471 missions. Spick claims that Weiß shot down 90 aircraft on the Eastern front and 31 on Western Front. Mathews and Foreman, authors of Luftwaffe Aces – Biographies and Victory Claims, researched the German Federal Archives and found records for 122 aerial victory claims. This figure of confirmed claims includes 96 aerial victories on the Eastern Front and 26 Western Front, including three four-engined bombers.

Victory claims were logged to a map-reference (PQ = Planquadrat), for example "PQ 10191". The Luftwaffe grid map (Jägermeldenetz) covered all of Europe, western Russia and North Africa and was composed of rectangles measuring 15 minutes of latitude by 30 minutes of longitude, an area of about 360 square miles (930 km^{2}). These sectors were then subdivided into 36 smaller units to give a location area 3 km × 4 km (1.9 mi × 2.5 mi) in size.

Chronicle of aerial victories
This and the ? (question mark) indicates information discrepancies listed by Prien, Stemmer, Rodeike, Bock, Mathews and Foreman.
Claim	Date	Time	Type	Location	Claim	Date	Time	Type	Location
– 6. Staffel of Jagdgeschwader 26 – On the Western Front — 22 June 1941 – 31 December 1941
1	21 September 1941	16:25	Spitfire	5 km (3.1 mi) northwest of Berck					
– 6. Staffel of Jagdgeschwader 26 – On the Western Front — 1 January – 31 December 1942
2	9 March 1942	16:40	Spitfire	4–6 km (2.5–3.7 mi) west of Boulogne	3	31 May 1942	19:40	Spitfire	Abbeville
– 1. Staffel of Jagdgeschwader 54 – Eastern Front — 1 May 1942 – 3 February 1943
4	12 January 1943	09:57	Il-2	PQ 10191 east of Mga	9	15 January 1943	11:47? (Note: According to Mathews and Foreman claimed at 11:57.)	Yak-1	PQ 00252; 15 km (9.3 mi) west-southwest of Shlisselburg
5	12 January 1943	14:19? (Note: According to Mathews and Foreman claimed at 14:10.)	Il-2	PQ 00262; 10 km (6.2 mi) southwest of Shlisselburg	10	23 January 1943	12:55	P-40	PQ 10324; 10 km (6.2 mi) southeast of Mga
6	14 January 1943	09:15	Il-2	PQ 10182 east of Mga	11	24 January 1943	14:47	Il-2	PQ 00412; 10 km (6.2 mi) east of Pushkin
7	14 January 1943	12:35	I-153	PQ 10322; 10 km (6.2 mi) southeast of Mga	12	29 January 1943	14:33	Il-2	PQ 10153 southeast of Shlisselburg
8	15 January 1943	09:25	Su-2 (Seversky)	PQ 10143 south of Shlisselburg					
– 1. Staffel of Jagdgeschwader 54 – Eastern Front — February 1943
13	10 February 1943	11:15	Il-2	PQ 36 Ost 10151 southeast of Shlisselburg	16	17 February 1943	15:34	Il-2	PQ 36 Ost 10611; 20 km (12 mi) northeast of Luban
14	11 February 1943	08:25	La-5	PQ 36 Ost 00412; 10 km (6.2 mi) east of Pushkin	17	23 February 1943	14:25	Il-2	PQ 36 Ost 00283; 20 km (12 mi) west of Mga
15	14 February 1943	15:08	I-153	PQ 36 Ost 00414; 10 km (6.2 mi) east of Pushkin					
– 3. Staffel of Jagdgeschwader 54 – Eastern Front — March – 31 December 1943
18	7 March 1943	11:44	La-5	PQ 35 Ost 1835; 30 km (19 mi) north-northwest of Shlisselburg	43	14 August 1943	18:03	Il-2	PQ 35 Ost 51872; 10 km (6.2 mi) south of Bohodukhiv
19	7 March 1943	11:45	Il-2? (Note: According to Mathews and Foreman claimed as a Yakovlev Yak-7.)	PQ 35 Ost 18391; 45 km (28 mi) northeast of Cholm	44	17 August 1943	08:50	Pe-2	PQ 35 Ost 41491
20	14 March 1943	07:45	LaGG-3	PQ 36 Ost 00264; 10 km (6.2 mi) southwest of Shlisselburg	45	17 August 1943	08:57	Pe-2	PQ 35 Ost 41484
21	16 March 1943	07:20	MiG-3	PQ 35 Ost 18274; 20 km (12 mi) southeast of Staraya Russa	46	19 August 1943	15:25	P-39	PQ 35 Ost 51551, Popowka northeast of Bohodukhiv
22	17 March 1943	16:17	LaGG-3	PQ 35 Ost 18143; 20 km (12 mi) south-southeast of Staraya Russa	47	19 August 1943	15:27	La-5	PQ 35 Ost 51581 northeast of Bohodukhiv
23	20 March 1943	12:15	P-40	PQ 36 Ost 00283; 20 km (12 mi) west of Mga	48	19 August 1943	15:30	P-39	PQ 35 Ost 51554 northeast of Bohodukhiv
24	22 March 1943	08:53	Il-2	PQ 36 Ost 00421; Pushkin-Mga	49	20 August 1943	15:35	MiG-3	PQ 35 Ost 51581 northeast of Bohodukhiv
25	22 March 1943	08:54	Il-2	PQ 36 Ost 00238; 20 km (12 mi) west of Mga	50	22 August 1943	10:26	La-5	PQ 35 Ost 41691
26	22 March 1943	08:55	Il-2	PQ 36 Ost 00253; 20 km (12 mi) west of Mga	51	22 August 1943	16:02	P-39	PQ 35 Ost 61773; 15 km (9.3 mi) northwest of Kharkov
27	24 March 1943	06:54	La-5	PQ 36 Ost 10332; 20 km (12 mi) east-southeast of Mga	52	23 August 1943	17:00	Pe-2	PQ 35 Ost 60123; Gulf of Finland, north of Kunda
28	30 March 1943	18:28	MiG-3	PQ 36 Ost 00224; 15 km (9.3 mi) northeast of Pushkin	53	23 August 1943	17:05	Pe-2	PQ 35 Ost 60133; Gulf of Finland, north of Kunda
29	3 April 1943	18:11	P-39	PQ 36 Ost 00271; 15 km (9.3 mi) northeast of Pushkin	54	23 August 1943	17:07	Pe-2	PQ 35 Ost 60132; Gulf of Finland, north of Kunda
30	8 April 1943	16:35	LaGG-3	PQ 36 Ost 01774; 25 km (16 mi) north-northeast of Leningrad	55	24 August 1943	17:04	Il-2	PQ 35 Ost 60183; Gulf of Finland, north of Kunda
31	13 April 1943	18:02	Pe-2	PQ 36 Ost 00154; 10 km (6.2 mi) south of Leningrad	56	25 August 1943	18:17	La-5	PQ 35 Ost 51713; 15 km (9.3 mi) southeast of Achtyrka
32	2 August 1943	16:50	Il-2	PQ 35 Ost 54593; 30 km (19 mi) northeast of Karachev	57	28 August 1943	13:40	La-5	PQ 35 Ost 43792; 15 km (9.3 mi) south-southwest of Sevsk
33	2 August 1943	17:00	Il-2	PQ 35 Ost 54623; 20 km (12 mi) west of Bolkhov	58	30 August 1943	18:12	LaGG-3	PQ 35 Ost 35531; 20 km (12 mi) southeast of Yelnya
34	3 August 1943	17:13	Il-2	PQ 35 Ost 54831; 10 km (6.2 mi) northwest of Karachev	59	1 September 1943	05:58	La-5	PQ 35 Ost 36391; 15 km (9.3 mi) east of Yelnya
35	4 August 1943	11:54? (Note: According to Mathews and Foreman claimed at 11:57.)	Il-2	PQ 35 Ost 54532; 40 km (25 mi) west of Bolkhov	60	2 September 1943	10:10	LaGG-3	PQ 35 Ost 35512; 15 km (9.3 mi) southwest of Yelnya
36	7 August 1943	08:45	LaGG-3	PQ 35 Ost 54593; 30 km (19 mi) northeast of Karachev	61	4 September 1943	08:25	Yak-9	PQ 35 Ost 35574; 30 km (19 mi) south-southwest of Yelnya
37	10 August 1943	12:30	La-5	PQ 35 Ost 51573 northeast of Bohodukhiv	62	6 September 1943	06:55	Yak-9	PQ 35 Ost 26851; 10 km (6.2 mi) north of Yartsevo
38	12 August 1943	17:25	Il-2	PQ 35 Ost 41691	63	7 September 1943	16:40	Il-2	PQ 35 Ost 34234; 25 km (16 mi) southwest of Kirov
39	13 August 1943	07:45	La-5	PQ 35 Ost 5181	64	7 September 1943	16:41	Il-2	PQ 35 Ost 45773; 15 km (9.3 mi) west-southwest of Kirov
40	14 August 1943	07:08	La-5	PQ 35 Ost 51832, Dolstrik; 10 km (6.2 mi) south of Zolochev	65	10 September 1943	16:43? (Note: According to Mathews and Foreman claimed at 15:43.)	Yak-9	PQ 35 Ost 44171; 25 km (16 mi) northwest of Dyatkovo
41	14 August 1943	18:00	Il-2	PQ 35 Ost 50214; Gulf of Finland	66	10 September 1943	16:47? (Note: According to Mathews and Foreman claimed at 15:47.)	Yak-9	PQ 35 Ost 34263; 45 km (28 mi) southeast of Ostashkov
42	14 August 1943	18:01	Il-2	PQ 35 Ost 50213; Gulf of Finland	? (Note: This claim is not listed by Prien, Stemmer, Rodeike and Bock.)	15 September 1943	16:10	LaGG-3	10 km (6.2 mi) southeast of Yelnya
– 1. Staffel of Jagdgeschwader 54 – Eastern Front — September 1943
67	22 September 1943	11:30	Yak-9	PQ 35 Ost 58514	68	24 September 1943	10:10	LaGG-3	PQ 35 Ost 02532
– 10. Staffel of Jagdgeschwader 54 – Eastern Front — 28 September – 31 December 1943
69	17 October 1943	14:25	LaGG-3	PQ 26 Ost 90262, east of Oranienbaum; 25 km (16 mi) northwest of Krassnoje-Selo	75	17 November 1943	09:13? (Note: According to Mathews and Foreman claimed at 09:12.)	Il-2	PQ 25 Ost 97483; 45 km (28 mi) northwest of Velikye-Luki
70	17 October 1943	14:30	LaGG-3	PQ 36 Ost 00152; 10 km (6.2 mi) south of Leningrad	76	17 November 1943	09:15	Il-2	PQ 25 Ost 97483; 45 km (28 mi) northwest of Velikye-Luki
71	5 November 1943	14:50? (Note: According to Mathews and Foreman claimed over a Lavochkin La-5 at 13:50.)	Il-2?	south of Nevel south of Nevel	77	8 December 1943	11:29	Pe-2	15 km (9.3 mi) northeast of Aksis
72	12 November 1943	08:55	Yak-9	west of Nevel	78	14 December 1943	12:28	LaGG-3	PQ 26 Ost 90272; 20 km (12 mi) south of Lomonosov
73	17 November 1943	09:10	P-40	PQ 25 Ost 97562; 30 km (19 mi) east-northeast of Idriza	79	29 December 1943	12:57	La-5	PQ 26 Ost 90423; 15 km (9.3 mi) west of Gorodok
74	17 November 1943	09:12? (Note: According to Mathews and Foreman claimed at 09:11.)	P-40	PQ 25 Ost 97562; 30 km (19 mi) east-northeast of Idriza					
– 10. Staffel of Jagdgeschwader 54 – Eastern Front — 1 January – February 1944
80	8 January 1944	12:13	P-40	PQ 36 Ost 00182; 15 km (9.3 mi) northwest of Pushkin	90	24 January 1944	13:32	Il-2	10 km (6.2 mi) east of Gagarin
81	15 January 1944	10:38	Il-2	PQ 26 Ost 90283; 20 km (12 mi) southeast of Lomonosov	91	25 January 1944	10:00	Pe-2	
82	15 January 1944	13:01	Il-2	PQ 26 Ost 90414; 25 km (16 mi) south of Lomonosov	92	25 January 1944	10:08	Il-2	vicinity of Gagarin
83	15 January 1944	13:02	Il-2	PQ 26 Ost 90421; 25 km (16 mi) southeast of Lomonosov	93	25 January 1944	12:23	Il-2	10 km (6.2 mi) northeast of Gagarin
84	17 January 1944	10:50	Il-2		94	25 January 1944	12:25	Il-2	10 km (6.2 mi) north of Gagarin
85	17 January 1944	10:55	Il-2	near Pushkin	95	15 February 1944	13:10	Il-2	20 km (12 mi) south-southeast of Gorodets
86	17 January 1944	10:56	Il-2	10 km (6.2 mi) east of Pushkin	96	15 February 1944	13:11	Il-2	20 km (12 mi) south-southeast of Gorodets
87	19 January 1944	09:45	Il-2	15 km (9.3 mi) northwest of Novgorod	97	15 February 1944	13:12	Il-2	20 km (12 mi) south-southeast of Gorodets
88	19 January 1944	10:15	Il-2	10 km (6.2 mi) west of Novgorod	98	15 February 1944	13:13	Il-2	20 km (12 mi) south-southeast of Gorodets
89	24 January 1944	13:20	Il-2	20 km (12 mi) southwest of Gagarin					
– 8. Staffel of Jagdgeschwader 54 – Western Front — May – 21 June 1944
99	19 May 1944	13:17	P-38	southeast of Oschersleben	103	10 June 1944	14:21	P-47	PQ 15 West S/UU-5; Caen
100	27 May 1944	12:18	B-17	20 km (12 mi) northwest of Colmar	104	17 June 1944	19:03	Spitfire	PQ 15 Ost S/UT-2; Carpiquet
101	7 June 1944	13:45	Spitfire	3 km (1.9 mi) southeast of Caen	105	17 June 1944	19:08	Spitfire	PQ 04 Ost N/AA-1 southeast of Saint-Pierre-sur-Dives
102	7 June 1944	14:14	P-51	PQ 04 Ost N/AE-7/1, Guyancourt					
– Stab III. Gruppe of Jagdgeschwader 54 – Western Front — 21 June – 29 December 1944
106	22 June 1944	21:15	P-51	PQ 05 Ost S/UB-6/9; Bernay	114	23 July 1944	19:18	P-38	PQ 04 Ost N/BE-4; Arpajon
107	23 June 1944	16:50	Spitfire	PQ 15 Ost S/UU-2; Caen	115	28 July 1944	20:14	B-26	PQ 04 Ost N/AA-1; Vimoutiers
108	23 June 1944	16:57	Spitfire	PQ 15 Ost S/UU-2; Caen	116	6 August 1944	12:21	B-24	PQ 05 Ost S/UE/UD; Mantes-Pontoise
109	27 June 1944	13:47	Spitfire	PQ 04 Ost S/AA-4; Trun	117	6 August 1944	12:22	B-24	PQ 05 Ost S/UE/UD; Mantes-Pontoise
110	4 July 1944	19:45	Spitfire	PQ 15 Ost S/TS/US; Carentan-Saint-Lô	118	8 August 1944	14:48	P-38	PQ 15 Ost S/BT-4; Mortain
111	12 July 1944	14:30	P-47	PQ 04 Ost N/AB; Conches	119	28 September 1944	16:07	Spitfire	PQ 05 Ost S/ES-8; 1 km (0.62 mi) northwest of Apelstedt
112	12 July 1944	14:33	P-47	PQ 04 Ost N/AB; Conches	120	6 November 1944	14:48	P-38	PQ 05 Ost S/CP, Norderney over sea
113	23 July 1944	19:17	P-38	PQ 04 Ost N/BE-4; Arpajon	121	29 December 1944	11:00	Spitfire	PQ 05 Ost S/FQ-7; Gersten

=== Awards ===
- Iron Cross (1939)
  - 2nd Class (August 1940)
  - 1st Class (5 December 1941)
- Honor Goblet of the Luftwaffe on 8 May 1943 as Oberleutnant and pilot
- German Cross in Gold on 12 July 1943 as Oberleutnant in the I./Jagdgeschwader 54
- Knight's Cross of the Iron Cross with Oak Leaves
  - Knight's Cross on 26 March 1944 as Oberleutnant and Staffelkapitän of the 3./Jagdgeschwader 54 (Note: According to Scherzer as Staffelkapitän in the IV./Jagdgeschwader 54.)
  - 782nd Oak Leaves on 12 March 1945 as Hauptmann and Gruppenkommandeur of the III./Jagdgeschwader 54

=== Dates of rank ===
1 April 1941:	Leutnant (second lieutenant)
1 March 1943:	Oberleutnant (first lieutenant)
1 July 1944:	Hauptmann (captain)
