= Gerhard Thyben =

German World War II fighter pilot

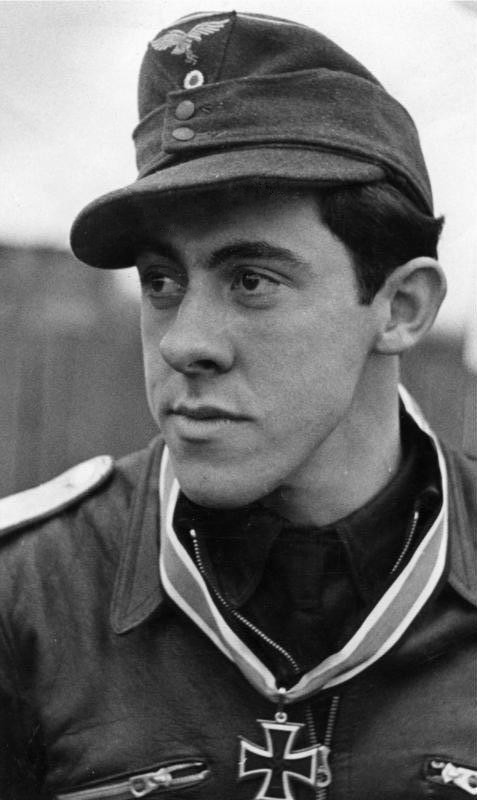
- Thyben following the Knight's Cross presentation
- Born: 24 February 1922; Kiel
- Died: 4 September 2006 (aged 84); Santiago de Cali, Colombia
- Military career
- Allegiance: Nazi Germany; Colombia
- Branch: Luftwaffe; Colombian Air Force (Post-war)
- Service years: 1940–1945
- Rank: Oberleutnant (first lieutenant)
- Nickname: Gerd
- Units: JG 3, JG 54
- Commands: 7./JG 54
- Conflicts: See battles World War II: Defense of the Reich; Eastern Front
- Awards: Knight's Cross of the Iron Cross with Oak Leaves
- Other work: Crop dusting

Gerhard Thyben (24 February 1922 – 4 September 2006) was a German military aviator who served in the Luftwaffe from 1940 until the end of World War II and later as an instructor with the Colombian Air Force. As a fighter ace, he claimed 157 enemy aircraft shot down in 385 combat missions, five of which over the Western Allies the other 152 were claimed on the Eastern Front.

Born in Kiel, Thyben volunteered for service in the Luftwaffe of Nazi Germany in 1940. After a period of training at various pilot and fighter pilot schools, he was posted to Jagdgeschwader 3 "Udet" (JG 3—3rd Fighter Wing), operating on the Eastern Front. He claimed his first aerial victory on 26 February 1943. In August 1943, his unit was transferred to Western Front where he claimed five aerial victories. In 1944, Thyben was transferred to Jagdgeschwader 54 (JG 54—54th Fighter Wing) which was based on the Eastern Front. In September 1944, Thyben was appointed Staffelkapitän (squadron leader) of 7. Staffel (7th squadron) of JG 54 and was awarded the Knight's Cross of the Iron Cross for 116 aerial victories in December. Following his 156th aerial victory, he was injured in combat and received the Knight's Cross of the Iron Cross with Oak Leaves in April 1945.

Following World War II, Thyben left Germany and moved Spain, later to Argentina and then to Colombia where he worked for the Colombian Air Force as an instructor. He continued to pursue a career in civil aviation until his retirement. Thyben died on 4 September 2006 in Cali, Colombia.

== Early life and career ==
Thyben was born on 24 February 1922 in Kiel, at the time the capital of the Province of Schleswig-Holstein, a free State of Prussia in the Weimar Republic. He was the son of Fritz Thyben, a manager (Prokurist) with Johannsen & Schmielau, and his wife Lisbeth, née Ebelmann. While in school, Thyben joined the Hitler Youth where he learned to fly the Schneider Grunau 9 glider aircraft. Following graduation from school, he volunteered for military service in the Luftwaffe on 15 July 1940. Until October, he completed his recruit training with Fliegerausbildungs-Regiment 71 (71st Aviators Training Regiment) in Wien-Stammersdorf. He was then transferred to Flugzeugführerschule A/B 113 in Brünn, (Note: Flight training in the Luftwaffe progressed through the levels A1, A2 and B1, B2, referred to as A/B flight training. A training included theoretical and practical training in aerobatics, navigation, long-distance flights and dead-stick landings. The B courses included high-altitude flights, instrument flights, night landings, and training to handle the aircraft in difficult situations.) present-day Brno in the Czech Republic, where he learned to fly the Heinkel He 72 Kadett. He was then transferred to 3./Fliegerausbildungs-Regiment 32 (3rd company of the 32nd Aviators Training Regiment) in Rochefort-en-Terre for further flight training on 14 October. On 15 November he was transferred to another flight school where he was promoted to Gefreiter (Privat First Class) on 1 July 1941.

On 16 September 1941, Thyben was posted to the Jagdfliegervorschule 2 (2nd fighter pilot pre-school), passing this course on 14 December. He was then transferred to the Jagdfliegerschule 5 (5th fighter pilot school) in Wien-Schwechat. There, for disciplinary reasons, he was arrested for six days in April and further five days in May 1942. After he completed his fighter pilot training on 1 November, Thyben was then posted to the 3. Staffel (3rd squadron) of Ergänzungs-Jagdgruppe Ost, a specialized training unit for new fighter pilots destined for the Eastern Front, and on 13 November to 1. Staffel of Ergänzungs-Jagdgruppe Süd. (Note: For an explanation of Luftwaffe unit designations see Organization of the Luftwaffe during World War II.) On 13 December 1942, Thyben was posted to the II. Gruppe (2nd group) of Jagdgeschwader 3 "Udet" (JG 3—3rd Fighter Wing), named after the World War I fighter ace Ernst Udet. This Gruppe was then based on the southern sector of the Eastern Front and Thyben was assigned to 6. Staffel.

== World War II ==
World War II in Europe began on Friday 1 September 1939, when German forces invaded Poland. Following his posting to JG 3, Thyben travelled to Krakau, present-day Kraków, where he waited for an aircraft to shuttle to his unit on the Eastern Front. On 28 December 1942, Thyben was assigned a Messerschmitt Bf 109 and together with two other Luftwaffe pilots flew to Lemberg, present-day Lviv. Adverse weather conditions delayed his flight east. Seven days later, he flew to Kirovohrad, present-day Kropyvnytskyi, and onwards to Zaporozhye. Due to further delays, Thyben eventually arrived with II. Gruppe of JG 3, then based at Rovenky and commanded by Hauptmann Kurt Brändle, on 22 January 1943.

Thyben had arrived at the front during the closing days of the Battle of Stalingrad which ended in the defeat of the German 6th Army. On 6 February, II. Gruppe retreated 110 kilometers (68 miles) to an airfield near Makiivka where they stayed until 5 April. Flying combat missions along the Mius-Front, Thyben claimed his first aerial victory on 26 February when he shot down a Lend-Lease Douglas A-20 Havoc bomber, also known as "Boston". On 1 April 1943, Thyben was promoted to Unteroffizier (non-commissioned officer). On 25 May 1943 following his sixth aerial victory, Thyben was awarded the Iron Cross 2nd Class (Eisernes Kreuz zweiter Klasse).

=== Defense of the Reich ===
In early August 1943, II. Gruppe was withdrawn from the Eastern Front for service in Defense of the Reich on the Western Front. The Gruppe spent one-month training in northern Germany before they arrived at the Schiphol airfield near Amsterdam in the Netherlands on 12 September. Thyben claimed his first aerial victory on the Western Front on 8 October. That day the United States Army Air Forces (USAAF) attacked the harbor and shipyards at Bremen and the U-boat manufacturing site at Bremen-Vegesack. At 14:08 II. Gruppe was scrambled and took off from Schiphol airfield. The Gruppe intercepted a formation of Boeing B-17 Flying Fortress bombers and their escorting Republic P-47 Thunderbolt at 15:00 over the IJsselmeer. In this encounter, II. Gruppe pilots claimed two B-17 bombers shot down, one of which was not confirmed, and a P-47 fighter shot down by Thyben. On 24 October 1943, Thyben was personally awarded the German Cross in Gold (Deutsches Kreuz in Gold) from Reichsmarschall Hermann Göring during a visit at Deelen Airfield. The presentation was made ad hoc when Göring learned that Thyben was credited with 33 aerial victories at the time. Since no spare German Cross was available, Siegfried Knemeyer volunteered his own German Cross which was then pinned on Thyben's uniform. On 3 November, Thyben flew as wingman to the Gruppenkomandeur, Major Brändle, the two got separated during aerial combat and Brändle was killed in action.

On 25 December 1943, II. Gruppe was withdrawn from combat operations and ordered to relocate to Rotenburg an der Wümme for a period of rest and replenishment. Thyben suffered from abdominal pain caused by lactose intolerance, the root cause not understood at the time. The pain was particularly severe while flying at high altitudes. In consequence, a Luftwaffe doctor advised to transfer Thyben to the Eastern Front where aerial combat for the most part took place below an altitude of 4,000 meters (13,000 feet). On 20 April 1944, Thyben was informed that he was transferred to Jagdgeschwader 54 (JG 54—54th Fighter Wing). He arrived with JG 54 on 24 April. Two days later he was assigned to 5. Staffel which was based at Idritsa. At the time, 5. Staffel was commanded by Oberleutnant Emil Lang while II. Gruppe of JG 54 to which the Staffel was subordinated was headed by Major Erich Rudorffer.

=== Eastern Front ===
In September 1944, Thyben was appointed Staffelkapitän (squadron leader) of 7. Staffel of JG 54, succeeding Leutnant Hermann Schleinhege who had temporarily led the Staffel after Hauptmann Franz Eisenach had been transferred on 8 August. On 30 September, Thyben was credited with his 100th aerial victory. He was the 93rd Luftwaffe pilot to achieve the century mark. On 6 December 1944, Thyben was awarded the Knight's Cross of the Iron Cross (Ritterkreuz des Eisernen Kreuzes) after 116 aerial victories. The presentation was made by General der Flieger Kurt Pflugbeil at an airfield in Libau, present-day Liepāja, on 9 December. On 9 February 1945, Thyben was promoted to Oberleutnant (first lieutenant).

Following his 156th aerial victory, Thyben was awarded the Knight's Cross of the Iron Cross with Oak Leaves (Ritterkreuz des Eisernen Kreuzes mit Eichenlaub) on 8 April 1945. He was the 822nd member of the German armed forces to be so honored. On 8 May, with his mechanic Albert Mayers as a passenger in the radio compartment, Thyben and his wingman Feldwebel Fritz Hangebrauk flew west. Over the Baltic Sea, he shot down a Petlyakov Pe-2 bomber that was almost certainly looking for German refugee ships escaping from the besieged Courland Pocket. Thyben caught the reconnaissance Pe-2 at 07:54 and achieved what very well might have been the last Focke-Wulf Fw 190 victory of World War II.

== Later life ==
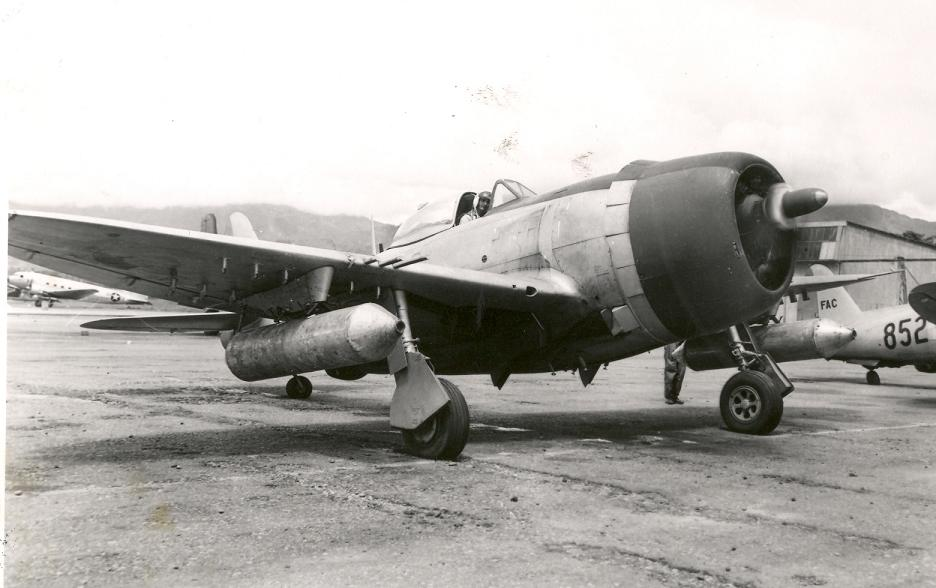
A F-47 of the Colombian Air Force, similar to those flown by Thyben.

Thyben was released from British captivity on 10 July 1945. On 17 March 1948, Thyben left Kiel heading to Spain by taking a train to Toulouse in southern France. From Toulouse, he headed to the Pyrenees on foot, crossing the border on 22 March. His ambition to continue flying in Spain remained unfulfilled. On 15 February 1949, with the aid of the Falange, a fascist party created by General Francisco Franco in 1937, Thyben boarded the Rio Santa Cruz heading to Argentina. Thyben settled in Buenos Aires where he found work in automotive painting. As a member of the German community living in Buenos Aires, Thyben met and married Magda Sonnenberger, the widow of a German officer killed on the Eastern Front. In 1954, the former General der Jagdflieger, Adolf Galland, visited Thyben and rekindled Thyben's desire to fly. With the aid of another former member of the Luftwaffe, Thyben was led to believe that he could fly for Avianca airline in Colombia.

Arriving in Bogotá, Colombia, Thyben, who did not own a civil pilots license, failed to find employment as a pilot. The Colombian Civil Aviation Authority however offered him civil employment with Colombian Air Force as an instructor and consultant. His contract started on 19 July 1954 and was issued for one year with the option of extension. Based at the Captain Germán Olano Moreno Air Base near Puerto Salgar, Thyben flew the F-47, a post World war II designation of the Republic P-47 Thunderbolt. He was also asked to fly combat missions during La Violencia, a ten-year civil war in Colombia from 1948 to 1958, between the Colombian Conservative Party and the Colombian Liberal Party, which he rejected. His contract was extended by a second year during which he taught at the Marco Fidel Suárez Air Base near Cali, also known as Santiago de Cali. There he flew the Boeing-Stearman Model 75, the North American T-6 Texan and the Beechcraft T-34 Mentor as a flight instructor. During this period, Magda gave birth to their son Gerhard Friedrich Wilhelm Thyben Sonnenberger.

Thyben's contract with the Colombian Air Force ended after two years of service. Having received a civilian pilots license, he then found work flying air taxis for Aviance (Aerotaxi de Avianca). Based in Bucaramanga, Aerotaxi de Avianca was equipped with the Cessna 195 and de Havilland Canada DHC-2 Beaver. Avianca also operated the Bell 47 helicopter which Thyben learned to fly. A flight accident on 30 December 1960 resulted in his dismissal. Thyben then found work flying agricultural aircraft in Tolima. In 1979, Thyben attended an international fighter pilot meeting held in Fürstenfeldbruck. Among others, the meeting was attended by Douglas Bader, Robert Stanford Tuck, Günther Rall, Erich Hartmann, Gerhard Barkhorn, Adolf Galland and Walter Scheel. On the return flight to Colombia, Thyben's luggage was lost, including his original Knight's Cross of the Iron Cross with Oak Leaves. The Knight's Cross later showed up again in the United States with a private collector. However, US authorities were unable to confiscate his stolen Knight's Cross and return it. Thyben died on 4 September 2006 in Cali, Colombia.

== Summary of career ==
=== Aerial victory claims ===
According to US historian David T. Zabecki, Thyben was credited with 157 aerial victories. Spick also lists him with 157 aerial victories, 152 on the Eastern Front and five on the Western Front, claimed in 385 combat missions, and a mission-to-claim ratio of 2.45. In addition, Obermaier states that he flew 22 close air support missions on which he claimed two aircraft and seven trucks destroyed on the ground. Mathews and Foreman, authors of Luftwaffe Aces — Biographies and Victory Claims, researched the German Federal Archives and state that Thyben was credited with 157 aerial victories. This figure includes 152 aerial victories on the Eastern Front and 5 over the Western Allies.

Victory claims were logged to a map-reference (PQ = Planquadrat), for example "PQ 34 Ost 79142". The Luftwaffe grid map (Jägermeldenetz) covered all of Europe, western Russia and North Africa and was composed of rectangles measuring 15 minutes of latitude by 30 minutes of longitude, an area of about 360 square miles (930 km^{2}). These sectors were then subdivided into 36 smaller units to give a location area 3 km × 4 km (1.9 mi × 2.5 mi) in size.

Chronicle of aerial victories
This and the ♠ (Ace of spades) indicates those aerial victories which made Thyben an "ace-in-a-day", a term which designates a fighter pilot who has shot down five or more airplanes in a single day. This and the ? (question mark) indicates information discrepancies listed by Prien, Stemmer, Rodeike, Balke, Bock, Mathews and Foreman.
Claim	Date	Time	Type	Location	Claim	Date	Time	Type	Location
– 6. Staffel of Jagdgeschwader 3 "Udet" – Eastern Front — 4 February – 3 August 1943
1	26 February 1943	09:15	Boston	PQ 34 Ost 79142, south of Barvinkove; 10 km (6.2 mi) east of Barvinkove	17	2 July 1943	07:46	Boston	PQ 35 Ost 61154, vicinity of Sawidowka; 20 km (12 mi) north-northeast of Vovchansk
2	6 May 1943	04:15? (Note: According to Mathews and Foreman claimed at 04:45.)	Boston	PQ 35 Ost 71343, east of Belgorod; 10 km (6.2 mi) north-northeast of Balakliia	18	6 July 1943	12:30	La-5	PQ 35 Ost 61492, southeast of Belgorod; 25 km (16 mi) east-southeast of Belgorod
3	8 May 1943	08:00	Spitfire	PQ 35 Ost 85143, north of Abinskaja west of Abinsk	19	7 July 1943	07:55	Yak-1	PQ 35 Ost 61453, east of Belgorod; 15 km (9.3 mi) east-northeast of Belgorod
4	8 May 1943	15:46	P-39	PQ 34 Ost 85142, northwest of Abinskaja west of Abinsk	20	7 July 1943	08:10	La-5	PQ 35 Ost 61472, southeast of Belgorod; 5 km (3.1 mi) south of Belgorod
5	11 May 1943	16:23	LaGG	PQ 34 Ost 86584, east of Slavyansk-na-Kubani	21	7 July 1943	17:02	La-5	PQ 35 Ost 60291, east of Malinovka; 20 km (12 mi) east-southeast of Malinovka
6	14 May 1943	12:15	Yak-1	PQ 34 Ost 85113, north of Mertschanskaja vicinity of Mertschanskaja	22	7 July 1943	17:14	La-5	PQ 35 Ost 60114, east of Kharkiv; 25 km (16 mi) south of Bilyj Kolodjas
7	1 June 1943	05:05	LaGG-3	PQ 35 Ost 61224, west of Bolenichino train station 15 km (9.3 mi) east of Prokhorovka	23	9 July 1943	06:20	La-5	PQ 35 Ost 62882, Prokhorovka; 20 km (12 mi) northeast of Prokhorovka
8	3 June 1943	03:15	La-5	PQ 35 Ost 61364, west of Belgorod vicinity of Belgorod	24	9 July 1943	06:35	La-5	PQ 35 Ost 61461, east of Belgorod; 25 km (16 mi) east-northeast of Belgorod
9	3 June 1943	03:22	Yak-1	PQ 35 Ost 61382, southwest of Belgorod vicinity of Orlivka	25	13 July 1943	05:56	Yak-1	PQ 35 Ost 62883, northeast of Prokhorovka; 20 km (12 mi) northeast of Prokhorovka
10	12 June 1943	03:39	La-5	PQ 35 Ost 61264, Bolshoj Bodjarugi; 25 km (16 mi) east-southeast of Prokhorovka	26	13 July 1943	06:02	P-51	PQ 35 Ost 62853, northeast of Prokhorovka; 25 km (16 mi) northeast of Prokhorovka
11	12 June 1943	07:15	La-5	PQ 35 Ost 61483, southeast of Belgorod; 15 km (9.3 mi) east-southeast of Belgorod	27	14 July 1943	06:47	Yak-1	PQ 35 Ost 61243, west of Oskotschnoje; 10 km (6.2 mi) south of Prokhorovka
12	23 June 1943	06:16	Yak-4	PQ 35 Ost 61424, north of Belgorod; 20 km (12 mi) northeast of Belgorod	28	20 July 1943	04:36	Yak-1	PQ 34 Ost 88264, northeast of Kuibyschewo vicinity of Jalisawehino
13	24 June 1943	05:25	Yak-1	PQ 35 Ost 61634, southeast of Vovchansk; 20 km (12 mi) north of Vovchansk	29	20 July 1943	15:50	Yak-1	PQ 34 Ost 88231, east of Dmitrijewka; 20 km (12 mi) northeast of Jalisawehino
14	24 June 1943	18:05	La-5	PQ 35 Ost 71583, east of Jefremowka; 15 km (9.3 mi) northeast of Bilyj Kolodjas	30	24 July 1943	04:42	Yak-1	PQ 34 Ost 88283, east of Kuteinykove; 10 km (6.2 mi) south of Jalisawehino
15	26 June 1943	19:28	La-5	PQ 35 Ost 61463, east of Belgorod; 25 km (16 mi) east-northeast of Belgorod	31	25 July 1943	18:24	Yak-1	PQ 35 Ost 61458, northeast of Belgorod; 15 km (9.3 mi) east-northeast of Belgorod
16	26 June 1943	19:34	La-5	PQ 35 Ost 71314, west of Szokojowka; 40 km (25 mi) northeast of Belgorod	32	30 July 1943	12:43	Yak-1	PQ 34 Ost 88433, southwest of Marijewka; 20 km (12 mi) southeast of Jalisawehino
– 6. Staffel of Jagdgeschwader 3 "Udet" – Defense of the Reich — 1 September 1943 – 31 December 1943
33	8 October 1943	15:34	P-47	PQ 05 Ost S/FM-4, over sea 50 km (31 mi) west of Egmond	34	30 November 1943	11:40? (Note: According to Mathews and Foreman claimed at 11:45.)	P-47	PQ 05 Ost S/KL-7; Dendermonde
– 6. Staffel of Jagdgeschwader 3 "Udet" – Defense of the Reich — 1 January – February 1944
35	11 February 1944	13:06	P-38	PQ 05 Ost S/RK-RL-PM-QL-QM east of St. Vith	37	11 February 1944	13:10	P-38	PQ 05 Ost S/RK-RL-PM-QL-QM east of St. Vith
36	11 February 1944	13:07	P-38	PQ 05 Ost S/RK-RL-PM-QL-QM east of St. Vith					
– 5. Staffel of Jagdgeschwader 54 – Eastern Front — April – 5 September 1944
38	30 April 1944	06:02	La-5	PQ 25 Ost 96384, 24 km (15 mi) east-northeast of Polotsk; 15 km (9.3 mi) southeast of Dretun	55	1 July 1944	08:08	La-5	PQ 26 Ost 91345, 6 km (3.7 mi) northeast of Kämarä; 20 km (12 mi) southeast of Vyborg
39	5 May 1944	04:36	Yak-9	PQ 25 Ost 96525; 25 km (16 mi) east of Polotsk	56	1 July 1944	13:22	P-39	PQ 26 Ost 81434, east of Vyborg; 10 km (6.2 mi) east of Vyborg
40	5 May 1944	18:45	Yak-9	PQ 25 Ost 96382; 15 km (9.3 mi) southeast of Dretun	57	3 July 1944	11:37	Yak-9? (Note: According to Mathews and Foreman claimed as a Petlyakov Pe-2.)	PQ 26 Ost 81464; 10 km (6.2 mi) southeast of Vyborg
41	12 May 1944	13:18	Yak-9	PQ 25 Ost 9754	58	4 July 1944	08:05	Yak-9	PQ 26 Ost 81474; Gulf of Finland, southwest of Vyborg
42	16 May 1944	07:41	Yak-7	PQ 25 Ost 88853, 2 km (1.2 mi) east of Velikaya; 40 km (25 mi) southeast of Ostrov	59	6 July 1944	12:09	Yak-9	PQ 26 Ost 91277; 45 km (28 mi) east-northeast of Vyborg
43	16 May 1944	08:07	Yak-9	PQ 25 Ost 88856, 4 km (2.5 mi) east of Velikaya; 40 km (25 mi) southeast of Ostrov	60	7 July 1944	06:44	Yak-9	PQ 26 Ost 91464; 65 km (40 mi) east-southeast of Vyborg
44	5 June 1944	11:26	La-5	PQ 26 Ost 70264, 12 km (7.5 mi) south of Lavansaari; Baltic Sea, 90 km (56 mi) northeast of Kunda	61	9 July 1944	09:16	Yak-9	PQ 26 Ost 91273; 45 km (28 mi) east-northeast of Vyborg
45	19 June 1944	20:01? (Note: According to Mathews and Foreman claimed at 20:06.)	Yak-9	PQ 26 Ost 81623, 16 km (9.9 mi) northeast of Koivisto; 25 km (16 mi) south of Vyborg	62	6 August 1944	18:00	Yak-9	PQ 25 Ost 89162; Lake Peipus
46	19 June 1944	20:10	P-39	PQ 26 Ost 81626, 6 km (3.7 mi) east of Römpötti; 25 km (16 mi) south of Vyborg	63	7 August 1944	06:57	La-5	PQ 26 Ost 80527, 12 km (7.5 mi) southwest of Narva southwest of Narva
47	19 June 1944	20:22	P-39	PQ 26 Ost 81415, 12 km (7.5 mi) north of Römpötti; 20 km (12 mi) south of Vyborg	64	7 August 1944	14:33? (Note: According to Mathews and Foreman claimed at 14:23.)	La-5	PQ 26 Ost 70631, Lavansaari; Baltic Sea, 10 km (6.2 mi) west of Hungerburg
48	20 June 1944	17:45	P-39	PQ 26 Ost 91323, 6 km (3.7 mi) north of Ristseppala; 30 km (19 mi) east of Vyborg	65	17 August 1944	12:10	La-5	PQ 25 Ost 79841 western edge of Lake Peipus
49	21 June 1944	06:41? (Note: According to Mathews and Foreman claimed at 07:28.)	LaGG-3	PQ 26 Ost 81543, 30 km (19 mi) west of Koivisto; Baltic Sea, northeast of Hungerburg	66	23 August 1944	09:22	La-5	PQ 25 Ost 69328; 20 km (12 mi) south of Tartu
50	23 June 1944	14:12	La-5	PQ 26 Ost 91122, 10 km (6.2 mi) northeast of Talikkala; 40 km (25 mi) northeast of Vyborg	67	23 August 1944	09:45	La-5	PQ 25 Ost 69688 south of Tartu
51	29 June 1944	07:03	Yak-9	PQ 26 Ost 81447; 20 km (12 mi) southeast of Vyborg	68	28 August 1944	17:50	Pe-2	PQ 25 Ost 69592
52	29 June 1944	08:03? (Note: According to Mathews and Foreman claimed at 08:16.)	P-39	PQ 26 Ost 91349, 15 km (9.3 mi) southeast of Säinio; Gulf of Finland, southwest of Vyborg	69	30 August 1944	17:29	Il-2	PQ 25 Ost 69549; Lake Wirz
53	30 June 1944	12:16	La-5	PQ 26 Ost 91345, 7 km (4.3 mi) northeast of Kämarä; 20 km (12 mi) southeast of Vyborg	70	4 September 1944	18:09	La-5	PQ 25 Ost 69592 east of Tartu
54	30 June 1944	20:13	Yak-9	PQ 26 Ost 81298, northeast of Talias; 20 km (12 mi) northwest of Vyborg	71	5 September 1944	16:52	La-7	PQ 25 Ost 69639 northeast of Tartu
– 7. Staffel of Jagdgeschwader 54 – Eastern Front — 6 September 1944 – 8 May 1945
72	6 September 1944	06:47	Yak-9	PQ 25 Ost 69596; 20 km (12 mi) southwest of Tartu	113	30 October 1944	12:00	Pe-2	PQ 25 Ost 17546; 20 km (12 mi) south of Liepāja
73	6 September 1944	10:42	Il-2	PQ 25 Ost 69651; Tartu	114	30 October 1944	14:31	P-39	PQ 25 Ost 17636; 55 km (34 mi) east-southeast of Liepāja
74	6 September 1944	13:55	La-5	PQ 25 Ost 69628 north of Tartu	115	30 October 1944	14:48? (Note: According to Mathews and Foreman claimed at 14:42.)	P-39	PQ 25 Ost 17613; 40 km (25 mi) east-southeast of Liepāja
75	6 September 1944	14:00	La-5	PQ 25 Ost 69624 north of Tartu	116	23 November 1944	08:20	Il-2	PQ 25 Ost 28183; Gulf of Riga, northeast of Ventspils
76	14 September 1944	10:43	Yak-9	PQ 25 Ost 68162; 20 km (12 mi) northeast of Walk	117	14 December 1944	12:16	Il-2	
77	15 September 1944	11:35	Yak-9	PQ 25 Ost 68191; 20 km (12 mi) north of Walk	118	14 December 1944	12:24	Il-2	
78	15 September 1944	12:00	La-5	PQ 25 Ost 68167; 10 km (6.2 mi) northeast of Walk	119	15 December 1944	11:12	Pe-2	
79	15 September 1944	12:11	La-5	PQ 25 Ost 68229; 25 km (16 mi) northwest of Walk	120	15 December 1944	11:24	Pe-2	
80	15 September 1944	17:15	La-5	PQ 25 Ost 58133; 20 km (12 mi) southeast of Moiseküll	121	15 December 1944	11:25	Pe-2	
81♠	16 September 1944	09:10	La-5	PQ 25 Ost 57256; 40 km (25 mi) north-northwest of Kreuzburg	122	21 December 1944	11:49	La-7	
82♠	16 September 1944	09:11	La-5	PQ 25 Ost 57258, north of Indrau; 40 km (25 mi) north-northwest of Kreuzburg	123	21 December 1944	12:05	Il-2	
83♠	16 September 1944	09:14	La-5	PQ 25 Ost 57292; 30 km (19 mi) north of Kreuzburg	124	21 December 1944	12:20	Pe-2	
84♠	16 September 1944	09:24	Yak-9	PQ 25 Ost 57231; 50 km (31 mi) north of Kreuzburg	125	21 December 1944	12:21	Il-2	
85♠	16 September 1944	09:30	Yak-9	east-southeast of Katrina	126♠	22 December 1944	11:39	Pe-2	
86♠	16 September 1944	15:40	Il-2	PQ 25 Ost 68176 vicinity of Walk	127♠	22 December 1944	11:47	Yak-9	
87	18 September 1944	10:11	La-5	PQ 25 Ost 57276; 35 km (22 mi) northwest of Kreuzburg	128♠	22 December 1944	11:48	Yak-9	
88	23 September 1944	15:50	La-5	PQ 25 Ost 37466; 15 km (9.3 mi) east of Jelgava	129♠	22 December 1944	14:20	Il-2	
89	24 September 1944	09:40	Yak-9	PQ 25 Ost 37418; 10 km (6.2 mi) northwest of Jelgava	130♠	22 December 1944	14:21	Il-2	
90	24 September 1944	09:41	Yak-9	PQ 25 Ost 37456 vicinity of Jelgava	131	23 December 1944	08:55	Pe-2	
91	24 September 1944	09:45	Il-2	PQ 25 Ost 37353; 20 km (12 mi) west-southwest of Jelgava	132	23 December 1944	08:56	Pe-2	
92	25 September 1944	12:40	Yak-9	PQ 25 Ost 37418; 10 km (6.2 mi) northwest of Jelgava	133	23 December 1944	08:59	Pe-2	
93	25 September 1944	12:44	Il-2	PQ 25 Ost 37274; 15 km (9.3 mi) northwest of Jelgava	134	29 December 1944	09:57	Pe-2	
94	25 September 1944	13:06	Yak-9	PQ 25 Ost 37337; 20 km (12 mi) west-southwest of Jelgava	135	29 December 1944	10:01	Pe-2	
95	25 September 1944	16:42? (Note: According to Mathews and Foreman claimed at 16:37.)	Il-2	PQ 25 Ost 57151; 25 km (16 mi) southeast of Mālpils	136	29 December 1944	10:02	Pe-2	
96	27 September 1944	17:41	Il-2	PQ 25 Ost 57141; 25 km (16 mi) south-southeast of Mālpils	137	29 December 1944	13:20	Il-2	
97	28 September 1944	17:24	Yak-9	PQ 25 Ost 58751; 20 km (12 mi) south of Wenden	138	20 January 1945	14:57	Il-2	
98	30 September 1944	10:31	La-5	PQ 25 Ost 48863 north of Mālpils	139	20 January 1945	14:59	Il-2	
99	30 September 1944	11:00	Yak-9	PQ 25 Ost 57146; 25 km (16 mi) south-southeast of Mālpils	140	26 January 1945	10:31	P-39	
100	30 September 1944	15:03	Il-2	PQ 25 Ost 57111; 10 km (6.2 mi) southeast of Mālpils	141	26 January 1945	10:32	P-39	
101	10 October 1944	09:55	Yak-9	PQ 25 Ost 07653	142	30 January 1945	13:04	Il-2	
102	10 October 1944	10:15	Pe-2	PQ 25 Ost 17522; 15 km (9.3 mi) southeast of Liepāja	143	9 February 1945	13:24	Yak-3	
103	16 October 1944	13:50	Il-2	PQ 25 Ost 17641; 25 km (16 mi) south-southeast of Liepāja	144	17 February 1945	07:55	Yak-9	
104	17 October 1944	14:46	Il-2	PQ 25 Ost 27546; 45 km (28 mi) north-northwest of Telšiai	145	17 February 1945	14:15	La-7	
105	22 October 1944	12:48	P-39	PQ 25 Ost 17469; 30 km (19 mi) southeast of Liepāja	146	17 February 1945	14:16	La-7	
106	22 October 1944	14:20	Pe-2	PQ 25 Ost 17587; 25 km (16 mi) south-southeast of Liepāja	147	23 February 1945	08:00	Il-2	
107	27 October 1944	11:08	Yak-9	PQ 25 Ost 27518; 55 km (34 mi) north-northwest of Telšiai	148	23 February 1945	15:50	Il-2	
108	28 October 1944	11:54	Il-2	PQ 25 Ost 07537	149	23 February 1945	16:00	Pe-2	
109	28 October 1944	15:10	Il-2	PQ 25 Ost 17567; 25 km (16 mi) southeast of Liepāja	150	23 February 1945	16:08	Yak-3	
110	29 October 1944	09:45	Il-2	PQ 25 Ost 17459; 40 km (25 mi) south-southwest of Kuldīga	151	24 February 1945	13:48	Yak-9	
111	29 October 1944	12:59	Yak-9? (Note: According to Mathews and Foreman claimed as a Yakovlev Yak-3.)	PQ 25 Ost 17687; 45 km (28 mi) east-southeast of Liepāja	152	5 March 1945	14:32	Pe-2	
112	30 October 1944	11:58	Pe-2	PQ 25 Ost 17551; 20 km (12 mi) southeast of Liepāja					
According to Mathews and Foreman, aerial victories 153 to 156 were not documented.
157	8 May 1945	07:54	Pe-2	Baltic Sea, west of Liepāja					

=== Awards ===
- Iron Cross (1939)
  - 2nd Class (25 May 1943)
  - 1st Class (10 July 1943)
- Honour Goblet of the Luftwaffe on 6 September 1943 as Unteroffizier and pilot (Note: According to Obermaier on 30 August 1943.)
- German Cross in Gold on 24 October 1943 as Feldwebel in the 6./Jagdgeschwader 3
- Knight's Cross of the Iron Cross with Oak Leaves
  - Knight's Cross on 6 December 1944 as Oberleutnant and Staffelkapitän of the 7./Jagdgeschwader 54 (Note: According to Scherzer as Leutnant and pilot in the 7./Jagdgeschwader 54)
  - 822nd Oak Leaves on 8 April 1945 as Oberleutnant and Staffelkapitän of the 7./Jagdgeschwader 54
