= Hans Dortenmann =

German fighter ace and Knight's Cross recipient

- Oberleutnant Dortenmann in 1945
- Born: 11 December 1921; Weingarten
- Died: 1 April 1973 (aged 51); Heidelberg
- Military career
- Allegiance: Nazi Germany (to 1945)
- Branch: Army (1939–1941); Luftwaffe (1941–1945)
- Service years: 1939–1945
- Rank: Hauptmann (captain)
- Units: 215th Infantry Division; JG 54, JG 26
- Commands: III./JG 54
- Conflicts: See battles World War II: Battle of France; Eastern Front; Battle of Narva; Leningrad–Novgorod Offensive; Western Front; Operation Overlord; Defense of the Reich; Battle of the Bulge; Operation Bodenplatte; Battle of Berlin
- Awards: Knight's Cross of the Iron Cross
- Other work: construction business

Hans Dortenmann (11 December 1921 – 1 April 1973) was a German Luftwaffe military aviator and fighter ace during World War II. He is credited with 39 aerial victories achieved in 150 combat missions. This figure includes 17 aerial victories on the Eastern Front and 22 over the Western Allies.

Born in Weingarten, Dortenmann grew up in the Weimar Republic and Nazi Germany. He joined the military service of the Wehrmacht, at first in the infantry, before transferring to the Luftwaffe where he was trained as a fighter pilot. Following flight training, he was posted to Jagdgeschwader 54 (JG 54—54th Fighter Wing) in November 1943. Flying with this wing, Dortenmann claimed his first aerial victory on 6 February 1944 over a Soviet Air Forces fighter aircraft. In mid-1944, elements of JG 54 were moved to the Western Front, fighting in the aerial battles of the Normandy invasion. In June 1944, he was appointed squadron leader of 2. Staffel (2nd squadron) of JG 54. This unit was renamed and reorganized a few times and became part of Jagdgeschwader 26 "Schlageter" (JG 26—26th Fighter Wing) In February 1945. Dortenmann was awarded the Knight's Cross of the Iron Cross on 20 April 1945, the last member of JG 26 to be so honored. He surrendered to British forces in May 1945.

Following World War II, Dortenmann studied civil engineering and worked in construction. He committed suicide on 1 April 1973 in Heidelberg.

== Early life and career ==
Dortenmann was born 11 December 1921 at Weingarten in the Free People's State of Württemberg. He was the son of a dentist. Dortenmann attended the National Political Institutes of Education (Nazi Secondary Education School) in Rottweil together with Erich Hartmann. He graduated with his Abitur (diploma) in 1939 and volunteered for military service as an officer candidate of the reserves with the Heer (German Army). Following the German mobilization, he was conscripted into service. His brother, Josef, also served in the infantry.

== World War II ==
World War II in Europe began on Friday 1 September 1939 when German forces invaded Poland. Dortenmann initially served with Infanterie-Ersatz-Bataillon 390 (390th Infantry Replacement Battalion) based in Heilbronn. There he received his recruit training. On 1 November 1939, the unit was moved to Iglau, present-day Jihlava in the Czech Republic. In late February 1940, Dortenmann was transferred to Infanterie-Regiment 390, a regiment of the 215th Infantry Division. At the time, the Division was stationed between Lauterbourg and Kehl, defending Germany's western border during the "Phoney War" period of World War II. The division fought in the Battle of France and breached the Maginot Line near Wörth am Rhein between 19 and 24 June 1940. Following the Armistice of 22 June 1940, the division remained in France where they were based at Belfort, Besançon and Nevers. During the Battle of France, Dortemann was awarded the Iron Cross 2nd Class (Eisernes Kreuz zweiter Klasse) on 2 June. In April 1941, he transferred to the Luftwaffe to undergo pilot training.

On 1 June 1941, Dortenmann was posted to the Flugzeugführerschule A/B 2 (FFS A/B 2—flight school for the pilot license) in Demblin, present-day Dęblin. (Note: Flight training in the Luftwaffe progressed through the levels A1, A2 and B1, B2, referred to as A/B flight training. A training included theoretical and practical training in aerobatics, navigation, long-distance flights and dead-stick landings. The B courses included high-altitude flights, instrument flights, night landings and training to handle the aircraft in difficult situations.) The school moved to Luxeuil-les-Bains in France on 25 June. On 9 June 1942, he was transferred to the Flugzeugführerschule A/B 116 (FFS A/B 116—flight school) in Göppingen, completing his Flugzeugführerabzeichen (Pilot's Badge) on 15 January 1943. In January 1943, Dortenmann was selected for fighter pilot training and was posted to Jagdgeschwader 103 (JG 103—103rd Fighter Wing), a Luftwaffe fighter pilot training unit. The unit was initially based at Bad Aibling but then relocated to Chateauroux-Deols Airfield in central France. There, Dortenmann trained on the French Dewoitine D.520 fighter aircraft, making 35 flights on this type. On 21 July, Dortenmann was posted to Ergänzungs-Jagdgruppe Ost, a supplementary training unit for fighter pilots destined to serve on the Eastern Front which was then based at Toulouse Airfield. Here, one of his instructors was Fritz Tegtmeier. On 9 August, Dortenmann was instructed to conduct a training flight in a Focke-Wulf Fw 190, climbing to an altitude of 10,000 meters (33,000 feet). During the decent, the aircraft went into an uncontrollable steep dive from which he was unable to recover. At an altitude of approximately 500 meters (1,600 feet), he bailed out and was injured in the hard landing. He was hospitalized in Toulouse, and following his convalescence, was sent on home leave for four weeks.

=== War against the Soviet Union ===
Emblem of JG 54

In November 1943, Dortenmann was posted to Jagdgeschwader 54 (JG 54—54th Fighter Wing) where he was assigned to 3. Staffel (3rd squadron) and shortly after, transferred to 2. Staffel. At the time, 2. Staffel was officially led by Oberleutnant Otto Vinzent who temporarily replaced Hauptmann Walter Nowotny as Gruppenkommandeur (group commander) of I. Gruppe (1st group). While Vinzent replaced Nowotny, 2. Staffel was headed by Oberleutnant Alfred Teumer. The Gruppe was based at Orsha and Vilnius, on the northern sector of the Eastern Front, flying the Fw 190 A-4, A-5 and A-6. Teumer made him the Technischer Offizier (TO—Technical Officer) of the Staffel. As a Technical Officer, Dortenmann was responsible for the supervision of all technical aspects such as routine maintenance, servicing and modifications.

On 14 January 1944, Soviet forces launched the Leningrad–Novgorod Offensive, an attack on the German Army Group North with the objective to lift the Siege of Leningrad. Dortenmann claimed his first aerial victory on 6 February 1944 over a Lavochkin La-5 fighter. In the engagement, Dortemann collided with the La-5, losing approximately 1 meter (3.3 feet) of his left wing. This resulted in a forced landing at the Orsha airfield. The aerial victory was witnessed by Oberfeldwebel Ulrich Wöhnert. On 28 February, his Fw 190 A-6 (Werknummer 550885—factory number) was hit in the engine during aerial combat with La-5 fighters which resulted in a crash landing. According to Mathews and Foreman, Dortenmann was credited with 15 aerial victories on the Eastern Front. The last claim was filed on 8 April over a Yakovlev Yak-9 30 kilometres (19 miles) south-southeast of Ostrov. According to Weal, he was credited with 14 aerial victories on the Eastern Front. Dortenmann was presented with the Iron Cross 1st Class (Eisernes Kreuz erster Klasse) by the Gruppenkommandeur, Hauptmann Horst Ademeit, and was sent on home leave to marry his bride-to-be Ingeborg.

=== Western Front ===
In January 1944, the Luftwaffe had planned to exchange JG 54 with Jagdgeschwader 26 "Schlageter" (JG 26—26th Fighter Wing) fighting on the Western Front. In order to keep up operations, the exchange was planned by rotating each Gruppe by Gruppe and every Staffel by Staffel. III. Gruppe of JG 54, under the command of Hauptmann Reinhard Seiler, was the first unit to relocate to the Western Front in February 1943. Following the Invasion of Normandy on 6 June, III. Gruppe was augmented by a fourth squadron by moving 2. Staffel of JG 54, under the command of Leutnant Horst Forbig, to France. On 12 June, Forbig was killed in action. On 20 June, Dortenmann succeeded Forbig when he was appointed Staffelkapitän (squadron leader) of 2. Staffel. Dortenmann was shot down by a Supermarine Spitfire near Paris on 26 June but managed to bail out of his Fw 190. On 22 June, the United States Army Air Forces (USAAF) Eighth Air Force, Ninth Air Force and Allied Expeditionary Air Force flew numerous missions in support of the Allied ground forces breaking out of the beachhead and the Battle of Cherbourg. Defending against this attack, Dortenmann claimed a Republic P-47 Thunderbolt fighter shot down near Rouen.

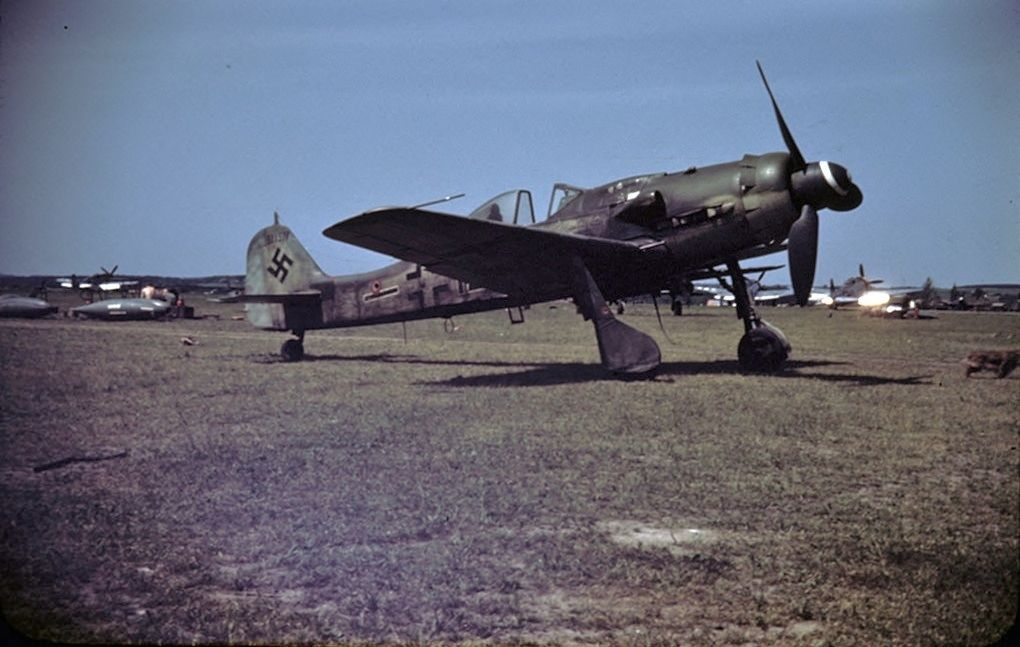
A Fw 190 D-9 similar to those flown by Dortenmann

In mid-August, III. Gruppe was withdrawn from Normandy and returned to Germany for conversion training to the new inline engine powered Fw 190 D-9, the first unit to receive this aircraft. The Gruppe withdrew to northern Germany for the conversion, making stopovers at Beauvais Airfield, Florennes Airfield and Bonn-Hangelar Airfield at Sankt Augustin before retreating to an airfield at Oldenburg. At Oldenburg, III. Gruppe was reformed with four Staffeln, retaining its former 9. Staffel, 10. Staffel was the former 7. Staffel, 11. Staffel was created from 8. Staffel, and Dortenmann's old 2. Staffel became the new 12. Staffel.

Following the conversion training, III. Gruppe of JG 54 under the command of Hauptmann Robert Weiß were moved to Achmer Airfield where they were tasked with flying airfield protection cover for the Messerschmitt Me 262 jet fighters of Kommando Nowotny. Dortenmann claimed his only four-engined bomber destroyed on 2 November when he shot down a Boeing B-17 Flying Fortress in combat near Osnabrück. The B-17 (Serial Number 4337531) belonged to the 708th Bombardment Squadron of the 447th Bombardment Group. The bomber was on a mission to bomb the ammonia factories at Merseburg. Flying a Me 262 jet fighter on 7 November, Hauptmann Franz Schall attacked a P-47 fighter near Münster. The P-47 was flown by Lieutenant Charles C. McKelvy from the 359th Fighter Group and was damaged in the attack by Schall but kept flying until McKelvy came under attack by Dortenmann. Although injured, McKely made a forced landing and was taken prisoner of war.

=== With Jagdgeschwader 26 ===
On 25 December, III. Gruppe of JG 54 was subordinated to JG 26. Arriving at Varrelbusch Airfield, the pilots were welcomed by JG 26 commanding officer Oberstleutnant Josef Priller. On 29 December, Dortenmann shot down a Spitfire near Münster. Dortenmann's Staffel was scheduled to form part of a third wave ordered to conduct low-level fighter patrols over the front. The main objective was for III. Gruppe of JG 54, IV. Gruppe of Jagdgeschwader 27 and Jagdgeschwader 6 to cover Me 262 jets from Kampfgeschwader 51 which were intended to carry out close air support operations. The German fighters were guided to their positions by ground control at Wiedenbrück which used VHF R/T in combination with FuG 16 ZY in each fighter. The system did not function properly on the day leaving them without guidance. An order to split the Gruppen up, at lower altitudes violated all the norms of fighter combat for it exposed small formations of German pilots to higher flying Allied fighters who could pick them off piecemeal. The ensuing operation was a disaster. Dortenmann, scheduled to lead the third wave, listened over the radio to the carnage. When his time came to take-off, he disobeyed orders to fly at 6,500 feet (2,000 metres), and climbed to 20,000 ft (6,100 m). Near Osnabrück, he encountered Spitfires and Hawker Tempests from No. 3 Squadron RNZAF and No. 56 Squadron RAF. Dortemann's men claimed two, confirmed via British reports, for the loss of one killed and one wounded. When he landed Priller informed him 3. Jagddivision had ordered his court-martial. His commander advised him to keep a low profile. The threat was never carried out, such was the demand for qualified pilots. Dortenmann's actions probably saved his unit from the same fate as preceding fighter units on the mission. That day, the Gruppenkommandeur of III. Gruppe, Weiß was killed in action. Command of the Gruppe was temporarily passed on to Dortenmann.

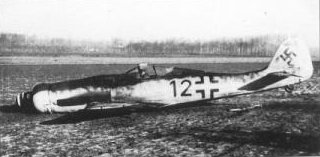
A Fw 190 D-9 of 10./JG 54, piloted by Leutnant Theo Nibel, downed by a partridge which flew into the nose radiator.

On 31 December, Dortenmann led a flight of 20 Fw 190 aircraft from III. Gruppe to Fürstenau in preparation for Operation Bodenplatte. Bodenplatte was an attempt at gaining air superiority during the stagnant stage of the Battle of the Bulge. That evening, the pilots were briefed on the mission objectives, which was the Grimbergen Airfield near Brussels. Under the overall command of Priller, 47 aircraft from the Geschwaderstab and I. Gruppe of JG 26, and further 17 aircraft from III. Gruppe of JG 54 took off at 08:14 on 1 January 1945. Flying at an altitude of approximately 50–150 metres (160–490 feet), the attack force sustained losses during the approach to the target area, largely due to anti-artillery fire. The airfield at Gimbergen was almost completely abandoned, the damage inflicted was minimal, and the losses sustained were significant. III. Gruppe of JG 54 alone suffered five pilots killed or missing in action, plus four further taken prisoner of war, making the mission a total failure. Dortenmann just made it to Kirchhellen.

On 15 February, III. Gruppe of JG 54 was placed under the command of Hauptmann Rudolf Klemm. Four days later, Dortenmann's 12. Staffel was disbanded, its pilots distributed over III. Gruppe. Dortenmann was given command of 11. Staffel while its former commander, Leutnant Hans Prager, received command of 9. Staffel. Dortenmann now took command of 11./JG 54. On 25 February, III. Gruppe of JG 54 officially became part of JG 26 as its IV. Gruppe. In consequence, 9./JG 54 became 15./JG 26, 10./JG 54 became 13./JG 26, and 11./JG 54 under the command of Dortenmann became 14./JG 26.

On 23 March, Allied forces launched Operation Plunder, the operation to cross the Rhine led by Field Marshal Bernard Montgomery. By 25 March, Montgomery's armies had crossed the Rhine in force, threatening the airfield at Nordhorn. In consequence, II. and VI. Gruppe of JG 26 were ordered to Bissel, present-day a neighborhood of Großenkneten. On 28 March, Dortenmann headed a flight of 12 VI. Gruppe aircraft to the area near Münster where a flight of No. 56 Squadron Hawker Tempest fighters was intercepted. Leading the attack, Dortenmann shot down one of the Tempests at 11:35 5 km (3.1 mi) southwest of Münster.

On 29 March 1945, Oberleutnant Alfred Heckmann, commander of 3. Staffel of JG 26 was transferred. In consequence, Dortenmann was given command of 3. Staffel as Staffelkapitän. Command of his former 14. Staffel was handed over to Prager. Dortenmann was awarded the Knight's Cross of the Iron Cross (Ritterkreuz des Eisernen Kreuzes) on 20 April for 35 victories. He was the last member of JG 26 to receive this distinction.

Dortenmann led a flight of 12 Fw 190s on mission from Rechlin–Lärz Airfield to Prenzlau on 26 April. The objective was to meet up with a dozen Panzerblitz equipped aircraft, providing fighter escort on an anti-tank mission. The secondary objective was to determine whether the East-West Axis—a street in central Berlin built as a triumphal avenue which in parts is now the Straße des 17. Juni—was still usable as a runway. Over the target area Dortenmann's pilots claimed four Soviet fighters, including a Yak-9 fighter shot down by Dortenmann southeast of Prenzlau. Later the pilots learned that they had escorted Generaloberst Robert Ritter von Greim and the test pilot Hanna Reitsch to Gatow Airport. The two were on a journey to meet Adolf Hitler in the Führerbunker. During the meeting, Hitler promoted von Greim to Generalfeldmarschall (field marshal) and appointed him Commander-in-Chief of the Luftwaffe. The next day, Dortenmann led a combat air patrol of nine Fw 190s from Rechlin to Berlin. The flight spotted seven Yakovlev Yak-3 fighters northeast of Berlin. Dortenmann shot down one of the Yak-3 fighters, this was his last aerial victory claim.

On 28 April, I. Gruppe relocated from Rechlin to an airfield near Neumünster in northern Germany. The Gruppe relocated for the last time on 2 May, flying all of the serviceable aircraft to Flensburg Airfield. On 4 May, Dortenmann led a flight of nine Fw 190s from I. Gruppe on a combat air patrol over the Kiel Canal. The flight landed at 18:24 at Flensburg Airfield, the last and final mission flown by JG 26. Generalfeldmarschall von Greim had ordered the relocation of JG 26 to Prague. However, the German surrender at Lüneburg Heath had been signed and Major Karl Borris, the commander of I. Gruppe, surrendered the airfield to the British on 6 May. Dortenmann had claimed 18 aerial victories flying the Fw 190 D-9, making him the most successful Luftwaffe fighter pilot to have flown this aircraft in combat.

== Later life ==
Following World War II, Dortenmann studied civil engineering and architecture. In 1956, he purchased the construction company Müller GmbH. Initially the business prospered during the years of the Wirtschaftswunder (economic miracle). In the early 1970s, business declined and the company was only able to procure contracts for building garages. Unable to cope with the decline, Dortenmann committed suicide on 1 April 1973 at the age of 51 in Heidelberg.

== Summary of career ==
=== Aerial victory claims ===
According to Obermaier, Dortenmann was credited with 38 victories claimed in 150 combat missions, with 16 victories over the Eastern Front and 22 over the Western Front. Spick also lists him with 38 aerial victories and a mission-to-claim ratio of 3.95. Mathews and Foreman, authors of Luftwaffe Aces — Biographies and Victory Claims, researched the German Federal Archives and found records for 39 aerial victory claims. This figure includes 17 aerial victories on the Eastern Front and 22 over the Western Allies, including one four-engined bomber.

Victory claims were logged to a map-reference (PQ = Planquadrat), for example "PQ 06774". The Luftwaffe grid map (Jägermeldenetz) covered all of Europe, western Russia and North Africa and was composed of rectangles measuring 15 minutes of latitude by 30 minutes of longitude, an area of about 360 square miles (930 km^{2}). These sectors were then subdivided into 36 smaller units to give a location area 3 km × 4 km (1.9 mi × 2.5 mi) in size.

Chronicle of aerial victories
This and the ? (question mark) indicates information discrepancies listed by Scherzer, Mathews and Foreman.
| Claim | Date | Time | Type | Location | Claim | Date | Time | Type | Location |
– 2. Staffel of Jagdgeschwader 54 – Eastern Front — February – April 1944
| 1 | 6 February 1944 | 15:28 | La-5 | PQ 06774, vicinity of Vitebsk | 9 | 29 March 1944 | 16:58 | La-5 | PQ 70711, vicinity of Narva |
| 2 | 25 February 1944 | 13:38 | La-5 | PQ 80543, southwest of Narva | 10 | 30 March 1944 | 15:40 | Yak-9 | PQ 60452, Kunda Bay northeast of Kunda |
| 3 | 26 February 1944 | 12:25 | Il-2 | PQ 60732, Wesenberg over the Gulf of Finland | 11 | 2 April 1944 | 11:46? (Note: According to Mathews and Foreman claimed at 11:48.) | LaGG-3 | PQ 60462, Kunda Bay northeast of Kunda |
| 4 | 26 February 1944 | 15:32 | Il-2 | PQ 60732, Wesenberg; 18 km (11 mi) east of Wesenberg | 12 | 4 April 1944 | 08:19? (Note: According to Mathews and Foreman claimed at 08:14.) | LaGG-3 | PQ 60334, Kunda Bay; Gulf of Finland, north of Kunda |
| 5 | 8 March 1944 | 16:33 | LaGG-3 | PQ 60462, Gulf of Finland northeast of Kunda | 13 | 4 April 1944 | 09:44 | La-5 | PQ 60483, Kunda Bay southeast of Kunda |
| 6 | 8 March 1944 | 16:38 | Il-2 | PQ 60453, Gulf of Finland northeast of Kunda | 14 | 6 April 1944 | 10:39 | LaGG-3 | 20 km (12 mi) southwest of Narva |
| 7? (Note: This claim is not listed by Scherzer.) | 26 March 1944 | 12:25 | Il-2 | over the Gulf of Finland | 15 | 8 April 1944 | 10:02 | Yak-9 | PQ 88841, vicinity of Pskov; 30 km (19 mi) south-southeast of Ostrov |
| 8 | 29 March 1944 | 16:57 | La-5 | PQ 70711, vicinity of Narva | | | | | |
– 2. Staffel of Jagdgeschwader 54 – Western Front — June – July 1944
| 16 | 22 June 1944 | 21:20 | P-47 | PQ TC 6 vicinity of Rouen | 19 | 18 July 1944 | 09:30 | P-38 | PQ AC 6 Ivry-la-Bataille |
| 17 | 24 June 1944 | 07:15 | P-51 | PQ UC 8 Évreux | 20 | 25 July 1944 | 20:12 | Spitfire | PQ AB 3 vicinity of Isigny |
| 18 | 4 July 1944 | 19:52 | Spitfire | PQ BS 9 Isigny | 21 | 26 July 1944 | 14:53 | P-38 | PQ BB 5 Saint Anne |
– 12. Staffel of Jagdgeschwader 54 – Defense of the Reich — November 1944 – 25 February 1945
| 22 | 2 November 1944 | 12:30 | B-17 | Engelbertswald, southwest of Lingen | 26 | 13 February 1945 | 16:56 | P-47 | PQ QQ 3, vicinity of Limburg an der Lahn south of Nassau |
| 23 | 6 November 1944 | 11:04? (Note: According to Mathews and Foreman claimed at 11:08.) | P-51 | PQ 05 Ost S/GR-1, Epe north of Bramsche | 27 | 13 February 1945 | 17:00 | P-47 | PQ PR 3, vicinity of Limburg an der Lahn; 5 km (3.1 mi) east of Nassau |
| 24 | 7 November 1944 | 15:30 | P-47 | PQ IQ 1, vicinity of Osnabrück; Münster-Handorf | 28 | 21 February 1945 | 17:30 | P-51 | PQ HP 7, vicinity of Rheine vicinity of Metelen |
| 25 | 29 December 1944 | 12:50 | Spitfire | PQ JQ, vicinity of Münster; Münster-Handorf | 29 | 22 February 1945 | 14:00 | P-51 | Farwick, southwest of Quakenbrück |
– 14. Staffel of Jagdgeschwader 26 – Defense of the Reich — 25 February – 29 March 1945
| 30 | 19 March 1945 | 13:36 | P-51 | Rheine-Lingen | 32 | 28 March 1945 | 11:34 | Tempest | 5 km (3.1 mi) southwest of Münster |
| 31 | 19 March 1945 | 13:37 | P-51 | Rheine-Lingen | | | | | |
– 3. Staffel of Jagdgeschwader 26 – Defense of the Reich — 29 March – 8 May 1945
| 33 | 31 March 1945 | 14:46 | Auster | Ludwighausen | 37 | 21 April 1945 | 15:19 | Spitfire | Buchholz |
| 34 | 12 April 1945 | 12:53 | Tempest | 15 km (9.3 mi) north of Uelsen | 38 | 26 April 1945 | 19:16 | Yak-9 | southeast of Prenzlau |
| 35 | 12 April 1945 | 12:54 | Tempest | 15 km (9.3 mi) north of Uelsen | 39 | 27 April 1945 | 18:25 | Yak-3 | northeast of Neuruppin-Berlin |
| 36 | 17 April 1945 | 11:34 | Tempest | southwest of Lübeck | | | | | |

=== Awards ===
- Iron Cross (1939)
  - 2nd Class (2 June 1940)
  - 1st Class (April 1944)
- Honor Goblet of the Luftwaffe (23 October 1944)
- Front Flying Clasp of the Luftwaffe for fighter pilots in Gold
  - in Silver (26 January 1944)
  - in Gold (24 November 1944)
- German Cross in Gold in 1944 as Oberleutnant in the 2./Jagdgeschwader 54
- Knight's Cross of the Iron Cross on 20 April 1945 as Oberleutnant and Staffelkapitän of the 3./Jagdgeschwader 26 "Schlageter"

== Notes ==
Military offices
| Preceded by Hauptmann Robert Weiß | Acting Commander of III. Gruppe of Jagdgeschwader 54; January 1945 | Succeeded by Oberleutnant Wilhelm Heilmann |
