= Hermann Schleinhege =

German World War II fighter pilot (1916–2014)

- Born: 21 February 1916; Essen, Kingdom of Prussia
- Died: 11 March 2014 (aged 98); Soest, Germany
- Spouse: Margret née Höber
- Military career
- Allegiance: Nazi Germany
- Branch: Luftwaffe
- Service years: 1936–1945
- Rank: Leutnant (second lieutenant)
- Unit: JG 54
- Conflicts: World War II: Eastern Front; Courland Pocket
- Awards: Knight's Cross of the Iron Cross

Hermann Schleinhege (21 February 1916 – 11 March 2014) was a German Luftwaffe fighter ace and recipient of the Knight's Cross of the Iron Cross during World War II. Schleinhege was credited with 97 aerial victories, all on the Eastern Front.

== Career ==
Schleinhege was born on 21 February 1916 in Essen in the Rhine Province of the German Empire. He joined the Luftwaffe before the war and upon completing his training, in February 1941, served as a flight instructor. In April 1942, he was transferred as an Unteroffizier to 6. Staffel of Jagdgeschwader 54 Grünherz (JG 54—54th Fighter Wing), at the time stationed near Leningrad. On 15 May, Schleinhege damaged his Messerschmitt Bf 109 F-4 (Werknummer 8618—factory number) during takeoff at Lyuban.

=== With the Geschwaderstab of JG 54 ===
After Schleinhege's transfer to the Geschwaderstab (headquarters flight) of JG 54, he began flying as wingman to the unit commanders, including Hannes Trautloft, Hubertus von Bonin (78 victories) and Anton Mader (86 victories), gaining valuable experience. Flying with the Geschwaderstab, he crashed Focke-Wulf Fw 58 Weihe B-1 (Werknummer 3576) near Oryol on 9 July. By the end of the year when they were based in Orsha with Army Group Centre, his score stood at 32 aerial victories.

Schleinhege was awarded the German Cross in Gold (Deutsches Kreuz in Gold) on 20 March 1944, and scored his 37th victory on 4 April. Upon completing officer training, the newly commissioned Leutnant Schleinhege was transferred to 4./JG 54 in Estonia, he claimed his 50th on 17 September. On 9 October, now based out of Riga, he shot down two Bell P-39 Airacobras and two Il-2 ground attack aircraft.

=== Squadron leader ===
In August 1944, Schleinhege temporarily assumed command of 4. Staffel of JG 54 after its former commander. Hauptmann Franz Eisenach had been transferred. On 1 September, the Staffel was redesignated and became 7. Staffel of JG 54. Later that month, he command of 7. Staffel was given to Leutnant Gerhard Thyben. At the end of November 1944, he was promoted to Staffelkapitän (squadron leader) of 8. Staffel of JG 54, remaining in this position until the end of World War II. By the end of the year, with his squadron based in Libau supporting the troops in the isolated Courland Pocket, his score had climbed to 81.

Schleinhege was awarded the Knight's Cross of the Iron Cross (Ritterkreuz des Eisernen Kreuzes) on 28 January 1945, for 84 victories. He and his pilots covered the naval evacuation of the pocket. Based firstly from Libau until March, then from Heiligenbeil, near Königsberg, until the end of the war. His last flight was on 8 May 1945 when he squeezed his two mechanics into his (nominally) single-seater Fw 190 and flew to Kiel to surrender to the British troops.

== Later life ==
Schleinhege died on 11 March 2014 at the age of 98 in Soest, Germany.

== Summary of career ==
=== Aerial victory claims ===
According to US historian David T. Zabecki, Schleinhege was credited with 97 aerial victories. Obermaier also lists him with 97 aerial victories claimed in 484 combat missions. Spick however lists him with 96 aerial victories claimed in an unknown number combat missions, all of which on the Eastern Front. Mathews and Foreman, authors of Luftwaffe Aces — Biographies and Victory Claims, researched the German Federal Archives and found documentation for 94 aerial victory claims, plus five further unconfirmed claims.

Victory claims were logged to a map-reference (PQ = Planquadrat), for example "PQ 35 Ost 28734". The Luftwaffe grid map (Jägermeldenetz) covered all of Europe, western Russia and North Africa and was composed of rectangles measuring 15 minutes of latitude by 30 minutes of longitude, an area of about 360 square miles (930 km^{2}). These sectors were then subdivided into 36 smaller units to give a location area 3 km × 4 km (1.9 mi × 2.5 mi) in size.

Chronicle of aerial victories
This and the – (dash) indicates unconfirmed aerial victory claims for which Schleinhege did not receive credit. This and the ? (question mark) indicates information discrepancies listed by Prien, Stemmer, Rodeike, Balke, Bock, Mathews and Foreman.
Claim	Date	Time	Type	Location	Claim	Date	Time	Type	Location
– 6. Staffel of Jagdgeschwader 54 – Eastern Front — 1 May 1942 – 3 February 1943
1	9 August 1942	11:05	R-5	west of Chrenowaja	4? (Note: This claim is not listed by Mathews and Foreman.)	26 August 1942	—	Il-2	
2?	14 August 1942	—	Yak-1		? (Note: This claim is not listed by Prien, Stemmer, Rodeike and Bock.)	7 January 1943	09:22	LaGG-3	
3?	26 August 1942	—	I-16						
– 6. Staffel of Jagdgeschwader 54 – Eastern Front — 4 February – March 1943
5	11 February 1943	08:55	Pe-2	PQ 35 Ost 28734; 40 km (25 mi) west-northwest of Ostashkov	7	7 March 1943	09:23	Pe-2	PQ 35 Ost 18274; 25 km (16 mi) southeast of Staraya Russa
6	27 February 1943	12:33	Il-2	PQ 35 Ost 18483; 45 km (28 mi) west-southwest of Demyansk					
– Stab of Jagdgeschwader 54 – Eastern Front — June – 31 December 1943
8	1 June 1943	04:56	Yak-1	PQ 36 Ost 10292; 30 km (19 mi) southwest of Volkhov	20	2 August 1943	13:03	Il-2	PQ 36 Ost 10183 east of Mga
9	8 June 1943	16:04	LaGG-3	PQ 36 Ost 20181 southwest of Volkhov	21	4 August 1943	06:33	P-39	PQ 36 Ost 10153 southeast of Shlisselburg
10	18 June 1943	06:22	Yak-1	PQ 36 Ost 21851; 30 km (19 mi) northeast of Volkhov	22?	19 August 1943	—	Yak-1	
11	18 June 1943	06:27	LaGG-3	PQ 36 Ost 21761; 15 km (9.3 mi) northwest of Volkhov	23?	19 August 1943	—	Il-2	
12	23 June 1943	20:02	LaGG-3	PQ 36 Ost 11743; Lake Ladoga	24	11 October 1943	09:10	Yak-9	PQ 35 Ost 06164
13	13 July 1943	11:44	LaGG-3	PQ 35 Ost 54167; 25 km (16 mi) south of Sukhinichi	25	12 October 1943	13:36	La-5	PQ 35 Ost 15544 south of Lenin
14	14 July 1943	14:07	LaGG-3	PQ 35 Ost 54474; 25 km (16 mi) west-northwest of Bolkhov	26	12 October 1943	13:55	La-5	PQ 35 Ost 15574 northeast of Gorki
15	17 July 1943	08:05	Il-2	PQ 35 Ost 63567; 10 km (6.2 mi) southwest of Maloarkhangelsk	27	14 October 1943	14:46	LaGG-3	PQ 35 Ost 15553; 20 km (12 mi) northeast of Gorki
16	17 July 1943	13:08	Yak-9	PQ 35 Ost 54642; 25 km (16 mi) west-southwest of Bolkhov	28	17 October 1943	09:47	La-5	PQ 35 Ost 06321
— ?	18 July 1943	07:02	LaGG-3		29	5 November 1943	10:28	Yak-1	PQ 35 Ost 06182
17	18 July 1943	07:18	LaGG-3	PQ 35 Ost 64879; 25 km (16 mi) south of Mtsensk	30	5 November 1943	10:50	Yak-9	PQ 35 Ost 06321
18	31 July 1943	11:10	Il-2	PQ 36 Ost 10154 southeast of Shlisselburg	31	30 November 1943	12:07	Il-2	PQ 35 Ost 05461
19	2 August 1943	12:37	Il-2	PQ 36 Ost 10156 southeast of Shlisselburg	32	30 November 1943	12:11	Il-2	PQ 35 Ost 05481
– Stab of Jagdgeschwader 54 – Eastern Front — 1 January – April 1944
33	12 February 1944	14:47	LaGG-3	PQ 35 Ost 06794	—	3 April 1944	—	unknown	
34	26 February 1944	15:58	Il-2	vicinity of Lake Peipus	—	3 April 1944	—	unknown	
—	28 March 1944	—	Pe-2		—	3 April 1944	—	unknown	
35	3 April 1944	09:55	LaGG-3	PQ 25 Ost 88391; 10 km (6.2 mi) southeast of Selo	37	4 April 1944	17:52	Yak-9	west of Lake Peipus
36	3 April 1944	12:15	Il-2	20 km (12 mi) southwest of Selo					
– 7. Staffel of Jagdgeschwader 54 – Eastern Front — August – November 1944
38	16 August 1944	13:08	Pe-2		56	28 September 1944	11:40	Yak-9	PQ 25 Ost 47291; 30 km (19 mi) south of Mālpils
39	17 August 1944	12:04	Yak-9	PQ 25 Ost 79582 west of Lake Peipus	57	28 September 1944	11:48	Yak-9	PQ 25 Ost 47236 south of Mālpils
40	17 August 1944	12:14	Yak-9		58	30 September 1944	12:35	Il-2	PQ 25 Ost 57144; 25 km (16 mi) south-southeast of Mālpils
41	23 August 1944	15:02	Yak-9	20 km (12 mi) south of Dorpat	59	9 October 1944	13:34	P-39	30 km (19 mi) west-southwest of Telšiai
42	23 August 1944	15:30	Il-2	west of Dorpat	60	9 October 1944	15:45	P-39	PQ 25 Ost 17688; 55 km (34 mi) east-southeast of Liepāja
43	25 August 1944	17:15	La-5	50 km (31 mi) north of Jēkabpils	61	9 October 1944	16:05	Il-2	30 km (19 mi) southeast of Liepāja
44	5 September 1944	17:30	Pe-2	50 km (31 mi) north of Jēkabpils	62	9 October 1944	16:07	Il-2	35 km (22 mi) southeast of Liepāja
45	15 September 1944	11:56	Il-2	Gulf of Finland, north of Kunda	63	10 October 1944	08:25	Pe-2	30 km (19 mi) east-southeast of Palanga
46	15 September 1944	11:57	Il-2	Gulf of Finland, north of Kunda	64	14 October 1944	14:00+	P-39	40 km (25 mi) northeast of Polanga
47	15 September 1944	14:03	Yak-9	PQ 26 Ost 60315 northwest of Kunda	65	16 October 1944	15:01	Il-2	35 km (22 mi) southeast of Liepāja
48	17 September 1944	09:25	Il-2	PQ 25 Ost 68146 north of Walk	66	16 October 1944	15:27	Il-2	40 km (25 mi) east of Liepāja
49	18 September 1944	18:14	Yak-9	40 km (25 mi) southeast of Mālpils	67	17 October 1944	13:22	Il-2	30 km (19 mi) southeast of Liepāja
50	18 September 1944	18:15	Yak-9	35 km (22 mi) southeast of Mālpils	68	17 October 1944	13:42	Il-2	30 km (19 mi) southeast of Liepāja
51	19 September 1944	15:31	Il-2	55 km (34 mi) north of Dorpat	69	27 October 1944	09:43	Il-2	30 km (19 mi) southeast of Liepāja
52	19 September 1944	15:32	Il-2	southeast of Paide	70	27 October 1944	11:36	Pe-2	20 km (12 mi) north of Polanga
53	23 September 1944	12:38	Yak-9	south of Jēkabpils	71	30 October 1944	12:12	Pe-2	
54	24 September 1944	11:25	La-5	15 km (9.3 mi) north-northwest of Valmiera	72	19 November 1944	17:30	Il-2	40 km (25 mi) east of Liepāja
55	28 September 1944	11:39	Yak-9	PQ 25 Ost 47266; 45 km (28 mi) east-southeast of Riga					
– 8. Staffel of Jagdgeschwader 54 – Eastern Front — December 1944 – 8 May 1945
73	14 December 1944	12:32	Il-2		86	29 January 1945	12:17	Il-2	Courland area
74	15 December 1944	10:50+	Pe-2		87	29 January 1945	12:28	Yak-3	Courland area
75	15 December 1944	10:58	Pe-2		88	6 February 1945	09:38	Il-2	Courland area
76	21 December 1944	10:17	Pe-2		89	21 February 1945	12:23	Il-2	Cīrava
77	22 December 1944	14:22	Il-2		90	21 February 1945	12:32	Pe-2	Cīrava
78	23 December 1944	08:58	Pe-2		91	21 February 1945	12:52	Pe-2	Cīrava
—	23 December 1944	—	unknown		92	23 February 1945	16:05	Pe-2	Cīrava
79	26 December 1944	12:28	Il-2		93	23 February 1945	16:06	Pe-2	Cīrava
80	27 December 1944	12:58? (Note: According to Mathews and Foreman claimed after 12:00.)	P-39		94	17 March 1945	16:43	Il-2	Courland area
81	29 December 1944	10:43? (Note: According to Mathews and Foreman claimed after 12:30.)	Yak-3		95	26 March 1945	08:47	Il-2	Courland area
82	29 December 1944	13:00	Il-2		96	26 March 1945	09:20	Il-2	Courland area
83	20 January 1945	10:53	Il-2	Courland area	97	9 April 1945	15:20	Pe-2	Courland area
84	26 January 1945	10:23	Il-2	Courland area	98	9 April 1945	19:21	Yak-3	Courland area
85	26 January 1945	13:24	Il-2	Courland area					

=== Awards ===
- Flugzeugführerabzeichen
- Front Flying Clasp of the Luftwaffe
- Iron Cross (1939) 2nd and 1st Class
- Honour Goblet of the Luftwaffe on 11 October 1943 as Oberfeldwebel and pilot (Note: According to Obermaier on 2 October 1943.)
- German Cross in Gold on 20 March 1944 as Oberfeldwebel in the Stab/Jagdgeschwader 54
- Knight's Cross of the Iron Cross on 28 January 1945 as Leutnant and pilot in the 8./Jagdgeschwader 54 (Note: According to Scherzer as Leutnant of the Reserves.)

== Notes ==
Military offices
Preceded by unknown: unit reformed October 1944	Squadron Leader of 8./JG 54 late November, 1944 – 9 May 1945	Succeeded by none: end of war
