= Franz Eisenach =

German World War II fighter pilot (1918–1998)

- Born: 11 August 1918; Reetz, Province of Brandenburg
- Died: 21 August 1998 (aged 80); Ottobrunn near Munich
- Military career
- Allegiance: Nazi Germany; West Germany
- Branch: Luftwaffe; German Air Force
- Service years: 1937–45, 1956–74
- Rank: Major (Wehrmacht); Oberstleutnant (Bundeswehr)
- Units: ZG 76, JG 1, JG 5, JG 54
- Commands: 3./JG 54, I./JG 54
- Conflicts: World War II: Eastern Front; North African Campaign
- Awards: Knight's Cross of the Iron Cross

Franz Eisenach (11 August 1918 – 21 August 1998) was a German fighter ace during World War II and a recipient of the Knight's Cross of the Iron Cross of Nazi Germany. He was credited with 129 aerial victories claimed in 319 combat missions, all on the Eastern front of the Second World War.

== Career ==
In March 1942, IV. Gruppe of Jagdgeschwader 1 (JG 1–1st Fighter Wing) was re-designated and became the III. Gruppe of Jagdgeschwader 5 (JG 5—5th Fighter Wing). In consequence, Hauptmann Fritz Losigkeit was charged with the creation of a new IV. Gruppe which was initially based at Werneuchen near Berlin. Oberleutnant Friedrich Eberle headed 10. Staffel which had already served as 3. Staffel of Jagdgruppe Losigkeit. The Einsatzstaffel of Jagdfliegerschule 4 under Oberleutnant Wilhelm Moritz formed 11. Staffel on 3 April. Eisenach initially led 12. Staffel created from some pilots of the former IV. Gruppe. Command of 12. Staffel then passed on to Oberleutnant Heinz Stöcker in October.

Eisenach was appointed Staffelkapitän (squadron leader) of 3. Staffel (3rd squadron) of Jagdgeschwader 54 (JG 54—54th Fighter Wing) on 17 April 1943. He replaced Hauptmann Gerhard Koall in this function who was transferred. On 8 July 1943, Eisenach was wounded in his Focke-Wulf Fw 190 A-5 (Werknummer 1503—factory number) during combat with Douglas A-20 Havoc bombers northeast of Panino. During his convalescence, he was temporarily replaced by Oberleutnant Robert Weiß as Staffelkapitän. On 18 December, he was again injured and shot down. On this occurrence, his Fw 190 A-6 (Werknummer 530391) was shot down by anti-aircraft artillery 4 kilometres (2.5 miles) northwest of Gorodok, south of Nevel.

In July 1944, Eisenach was given command of 4. Staffel of JG 54, succeeding Hauptmann Herbert Aloé who had been killed in action on 21 June. At the time, II. Gruppe of JG 54, to which his Staffel was subordinated, was based at Immola Airfield. On 10 June, Soviet forces had launched the Karelian offensive against Finland on the Karelian Isthmus as part of the Continuation War. In response to the Finnish ask for assistance, the Luftwaffe had formed Gefechtsverband Kuhlmey (Detachment Kuhlmey) on 12 June, named after Oberstleutnant Kurt Kuhlmey, the commander of Schlachtgeschwader 3 (SG 3—3rd Combat Wing). Gefechtsverband Kuhlmey was made up of the Stab and I. Gruppe of SG 3, I. Gruppe of Schlachtgeschwader 5 (SG 5—5th Combat Wing), elements of Nahaufklärungsgruppe 5, a reconnaissance unit, and II. Gruppe of JG 54.

On 8 August 1944, Eisennach was appointed Gruppenkommandeur (group commander) on I. Gruppe of JG 54. He succeeded Hauptmann Horst Ademeit who was killed in action the day before. Command of 4. Staffel was then temporarily given to Leutnant Hermann Schleinhege before the Staffel was renamed 7. Staffel and command was given to Leutnant Gerhard Thyben in September.

Soviet forces launched the Baltic Offensive on 14 September 1944. Thad day, Eisenach claimed his 100th victory on 14 September 1944 by shooting down an IL-2 Sturmovik. That day, he became an "ace-in-a-day" claiming nine aerial victories, include five Ilyushin Il-2 ground attach aircraft and four Petlyakov Pe-2 twin-engined dive bombers. He was the 90th Luftwaffe pilot to achieve the century mark. Eisenach was awarded the Knight's Cross of the Iron Cross (Ritterkreuz des Eisernen Kreuzes) on 10 October for 107 aerial victories.

== Later life ==
Eisenach re-joined the military service of the Bundeswehr in 1956. He left the service in 1974 with the rank of Oberstleutnant (lieutenant colonel). He died on 21 August 1998 at the age of 80 in Ottobrunn, Germany.

== Summary of career ==
=== Aerial victory claims ===
According to US historian David T. Zabecki, Eisenach was credited with 129 aerial victories. Spick also lists him with 129 aerial victories claimed in 319 combat missions, all of which on the Eastern Front, and a mission-to-claim ratio of 2.47. Mathews and Foreman, authors of Luftwaffe Aces — Biographies and Victory Claims, researched the German Federal Archives and also found confirmed records for 129 aerial victories for 154 claims filed.

Victory claims were logged to a map-reference (PQ = Planquadrat), for example "PQ 00253". The Luftwaffe grid map (Jägermeldenetz) covered all of Europe, western Russia and North Africa and was composed of rectangles measuring 15 minutes of latitude by 30 minutes of longitude, an area of about 360 square miles (930 km^{2}). These sectors were then subdivided into 36 smaller units to give a location area 3 km × 4 km (1.9 mi × 2.5 mi) in size.

Chronicle of aerial victories
This and the ♠ (Ace of spades) indicates those aerial victories which made Eisenach an "ace-in-a-day", a term which designates a fighter pilot who has shot down five or more airplanes in a single day. This and the ? (question mark) indicates information discrepancies listed by Prien, Stemmer, Rodeike, Balke, Bock, Mathews and Foreman.
Claim	Date	Time	Type	Location	Claim	Date	Time	Type	Location
– 7. Staffel of Jagdgeschwader 54 – Eastern Front — November 1942
1	8 November 1942	14:50	P-40	PQ 00253, Novaya Pustosh; 15 km (9.3 mi) west-southwest of Shlisselburg					
– 9. Staffel of Jagdgeschwader 54 – Eastern Front — December 1942 – 3 February 1943
2	9 December 1942	11:20	Il-2	Atby-Whariya	6	8 January 1943	09:25	Il-2	PQ 07724; 20 km (12 mi) southwest of Velikiye Luki
3	30 December 1942	11:55	MiG-3	PQ 07682; 15 km (9.3 mi) east-southeast of Velikiye Luki	7	12 January 1943	13:22	Il-2	PQ 07831; 25 km (16 mi) east-southeast of Velikiye Luki
4	30 December 1942	12:30? (Note: According to Mathews and Foreman claimed at 12:01.)	Il-2	PQ 07663; 25 km (16 mi) east of Velikiye Luki	8	14 January 1943	09:30	LaGG-3	PQ 07643; 10 km (6.2 mi) east of Velikiye Luki
5	5 January 1943	08:46	Il-2	PQ 07761; 25 km (16 mi) south of Velikiye Luki	9	15 January 1943	12:06	LaGG-3	PQ 07814; 20 km (12 mi) south-southeast of Velikiye Luki
– 9. Staffel of Jagdgeschwader 54 – Eastern Front — 17 April – 31 December 1943
10	24 May 1943	19:28	Il-2	PQ 36 Ost 09741	30	15 October 1943	13:38	P-39	PQ 35 Ost 07752, northeast of Nevel
11	24 May 1943	19:36? (Note: According to Mathews and Foreman claimed at 19:38.)	Il-2	PQ 35 Ost 09764	31	20 October 1943	09:10	Yak-9	PQ 35 Ost 06163, Lake Ssennitza
12	17 June 1943	05:16	P-40	PQ 36 Ost 10583; 25 km (16 mi) northeast of Lyuban	32	22 October 1943	15:25	La-5	PQ 35 Ost 15173; 20 km (12 mi) south of Rudnya
13	17 June 1943	05:20	LaGG-3	PQ 36 Ost 10421; 35 km (22 mi) east-southeast of Mga	33	27 October 1943	14:52	LaGG-3	northeast of Dubrovo
14	5 July 1943	09:57	La-5	PQ 35 Ost 63624; 20 km (12 mi) northeast of Maloarkhangelsk	34	28 October 1943	15:21	LaGG-3	south of Gomel
15	5 July 1943	14:45	LaGG-3	PQ 35 Ost 63393; 15 km (9.3 mi) northwest of Maloarkhangelsk	35	28 October 1943	15:34	Yak-9	south-southeast of Gomel
16	6 July 1943	07:52	La-5	PQ 35 Ost 63571; 15 km (9.3 mi) south of Maloarkhangelsk	36	5 November 1943	10:40	Yak-9	west-northwest of Lake Ssennitza
17	6 July 1943	14:12	La-5	PQ 35 Ost 63544; 25 km (16 mi) west-southwest of Maloarkhangelsk	37	5 November 1943	10:44	Yak-9	west of Lake Ssennitza
18	6 July 1943	14:31	LaGG-3	PQ 35 Ost 63722; 35 km (22 mi) west-southwest of Maloarkhangelsk	38	5 November 1943	10:46? (Note: According to Mathews and Foreman claimed at 14:46.)	Yak-9	east of Nevel
19	7 July 1943	08:32	Yak-7	PQ 35 Ost 63572; 35 km (22 mi) west-southwest of Maloarkhangelsk	39	6 November 1943	10:36	Yak-9	north of Lake Ssennitza
20	7 July 1943	14:12	P-39	PQ 35 Ost 63534; 10 km (6.2 mi) northwest of Maloarkhangelsk	40	10 November 1943	12:50	La-5	southeast of Nevel
21	8 July 1943	08:06	Boston	PQ 35 Ost 63563, northeast of Ponyri; 10 km (6.2 mi) southwest of Maloarkhangelsk	41	10 November 1943	13:42	Il-2	west of Nevel
22	30 September 1943	11:45	Il-2	PQ 35 Ost 06861	42	10 November 1943	13:43	Il-2	west-southwest of Nevel
23	30 September 1943	11:46	LaGG-3	PQ 35 Ost 06222	43	17 November 1943	10:22	Yak-9	southeast of Nevel
24	7 October 1943	15:40	Yak-9	PQ 35 Ost 06249	44	15 December 1943	09:14	LaGG-3	PQ 35 Ost 06344
25	9 October 1943	06:52	LaGG-3	PQ 35 Ost 06114	45	15 December 1943	11:37	Yak-9	PQ 35 Ost 06374
26	9 October 1943	06:54	Yak-9	PQ 35 Ost 06121	46	15 December 1943	11:40	Yak-9	PQ 35 Ost 06173
27	11 October 1943	07:05	Yak-9	PQ 25 Ost 97892 vicinity of Nevel	47	15 December 1943	11:52	Yak-9	PQ 35 Ost 06342
28	12 October 1943	12:52	Yak-9	PQ 35 Ost 15514, north of Leninsk; 20 km (12 mi) north-northeast of Krassnyj	48	18 December 1943	10:52	Il-2	PQ 35 Ost 06352
29	13 October 1943	08:40	Yak-9	PQ 35 Ost 15553, Leninsk; 20 km (12 mi) northeast of Gorky	49	18 December 1943	10:54	Il-2	PQ 35 Ost 06354
– Stab of Jagdgeschwader 54 – Eastern Front — June – 4 July 1944
50	26 June 1944	10:40	Yak-1? (Note: According to Mathews and Foreman claimed as a Yakovlev Yak-9.)	PQ 25 Ost 88471; 40 km (25 mi) southeast of Pskov	55	30 June 1944	18:15	P-39	PQ 25 Ost OT-4/4
51	26 June 1944	10:44	Il-2	PQ 25 Ost 88612; 15 km (9.3 mi) northeast of Ostrov	56	30 June 1944	18:18? (Note: According to Mathews and Foreman claimed at 18:17.)	Il-2	PQ 25 Ost OT-4/6
52	26 June 1944	10:46	Il-2	PQ 25 Ost 88624; 25 km (16 mi) northeast of Ostrov	57	2 July 1944	17:22	P-39	PQ 25 Ost PS-2/9; Pyatnitsa
53	29 June 1944	12:35	P-39	PQ 25 Ost PS-4/5	58	4 July 1944	17:17	P-39	PQ 25 Ost OS-4/8 vicinity of Siversky
54	30 June 1944	13:30	P-39	PQ 25 Ost PS-8/9					
– 4. Staffel of Jagdgeschwader 54 – Eastern Front — 24 July – 7 August 1944
59	24 July 1944	07:43	Il-2	PQ 26 Ost 70661; 35 km (22 mi) south-southwest of Narva	70	30 July 1944	19:53	Yak-9	PQ 26 Ost 60496 northeast of Kunda
60	24 July 1944	08:01? (Note: According to Mathews and Foreman claimed at 08:05.)	Il-2	PQ 26 Ost 70824; 25 km (16 mi) southwest of Narva	71	30 July 1944	19:54	Il-2	PQ 26 Ost 70357; Baltic Sea, 25 km (16 mi) northeast of Kunda
61	24 July 1944	19:53	Yak-9? (Note: According to Mathews and Foreman claimed as an Ilyushin Il-2.)	PQ 26 Ost 70694; 15 km (9.3 mi) southwest of Narva	72	2 August 1944	13:07	La-5	PQ 26 Ost 70454; Baltic Sea, 25 km (16 mi) northwest of Hungerburg
62	26 July 1944	16:52	Pe-2	PQ 26 Ost 60381; 30 km (19 mi) west-southwest of Wesenberg	73	3 August 1944	11:02? (Note: According to Mathews and Foreman claimed at 11:07.)	Yak-9	PQ 26 Ost 70661; 10 km (6.2 mi) west-southwest of Hungerburg
63	26 July 1944	16:55	Pe-2	PQ 26 Ost 60575 southwest of Kunda	74	3 August 1944	11:11	Il-2	PQ 26 Ost 70613; Baltic Sea, 25 km (16 mi) west of Hungerburg
64	26 July 1944	16:57	Pe-2	PQ 26 Ost 60581 southwest of Kunda	75	3 August 1944	11:21	Il-2	PQ 26 Ost 70653 in the vicinity of 15 km (9.3 mi) southwest of Hungerburg
65	27 July 1944	16:52	Il-2	PQ 26 Ost 70692; 15 km (9.3 mi) southwest of Narva	76	3 August 1944	20:08	Il-2	PQ 26 Ost 70694; Baltic Sea, 25 km (16 mi) west of Hungerburg
66	28 July 1944	04:48	Il-2	PQ 26 Ost 60393 northwest of Kunda	77	4 August 1944	09:18	Il-2	PQ 26 Ost 70692; 15 km (9.3 mi) southwest of Narva
67	30 July 1944	08:20	Il-2	PQ 26 Ost 70682; 30 km (19 mi) southwest of Narva	78	5 August 1944	12:50? (Note: According to Mathews and Foreman claimed at 12:00.)	Pe-2	PQ 26 Ost 50433; Gulf of Finland
68	30 July 1944	19:49	Il-2	PQ 26 Ost 60482 northeast of Kunda	79	5 August 1944	13:07	Il-2	PQ 26 Ost 50263 in the middle of the Gulf of Finland
69	30 July 1944	19:51	Il-2	PQ 26 Ost 70397; Gulf of Finland, north-northwest of Reval					
– Stab I. Gruppe of Jagdgeschwader 54 – Eastern Front — 8 August 1944 – 19 March 1945
80	15 August 1944	11:19	Il-2	PQ LJ-8/7	105	17 September 1944	12:40	Il-2	PQ 25 Ost 47356; 40 km (25 mi) south-southeast of Riga
81	15 August 1944	17:40	P-39	PQ LJ-5/3; 35 km (22 mi) north-northwest of Pasewalk	106	17 September 1944	12:50	Il-2	PQ 25 Ost 47365; 40 km (25 mi) southeast of Riga
82	23 August 1944	11:05	Il-2	PQ 25 Ost 57267; 40 km (25 mi) north of Kreuzburg	107	19 September 1944	16:01	Il-2	PQ 25 Ost 47148; 10 km (6.2 mi) south of Riga
83	24 August 1944	18:55	Yak-9	PQ 25 Ost 37395; 20 km (12 mi) southwest of Mitau	108	14 December 1944	12:11? (Note: According to Mathews and Foreman claimed at 18:11.)	Il-2	Gulf of Riga
84	26 August 1944	11:05	Yak-9	PQ 25 Ost 37366; 15 km (9.3 mi) west-southwest of Mitau	109	14 December 1944	12:15? (Note: According to Mathews and Foreman claimed at 18:15.)	Il-2	Gulf of Riga
85	27 August 1944	14:54	Il-2	PQ 25 Ost 58897; 45 km (28 mi) southeast of Wenden	110	15 December 1944	11:01	Pe-2	
86	27 August 1944	14:56	Yak-9	PQ 25 Ost 57235; 50 km (31 mi) north of Kreuzburg	111	15 December 1944	11:04	Pe-2	15 km (9.3 mi) east of Libau
87? (Note: This claim is not listed by Prien, Stemmer, Balke, Bock. However, the last aerial victory claimed by Eisenach on 27 August 1944 is listed as his 86th aerial victory while the first aerial victory claimed on 29 August is his 89th claim.)	28 August 1944	11:26	Il-2	50 km (31 mi) north of Kreuzburg	112	15 December 1944	11:05	Pe-2	15 km (9.3 mi) southeast of Libau
88	29 August 1944	18:55? (Note: According to Mathews and Foreman claimed at 18:53.)	Yak-9	PQ 25 Ost 37525; 30 km (19 mi) southwest of Mitau	113	15 December 1944	11:08	Pe-2	
89	12 September 1944	16:20	Pe-2	PQ 25 Ost 47553; 35 km (22 mi) north-northwest of Pasewalk	114	23 December 1944	08:45	Il-2	
90	12 September 1944	16:23	P-39	PQ 25 Ost 47572; 30 km (19 mi) northwest of Pasewalk	115	23 December 1944	08:47	Il-2	40 km (25 mi) south-southeast of Goldingen
91	12 September 1944	16:26	Pe-2	PQ 25 Ost 47587; 25 km (16 mi) north-northwest of Pasewalk	116	26 December 1944	10:02	Pe-2	55 km (34 mi) east-southeast of Libau
92♠	14 September 1944	11:52	Il-2	PQ 25 Ost 57215; 45 km (28 mi) east-southeast of Mālpils	117	29 December 1944	10:55	Yak-9	
93♠	14 September 1944	11:59	Il-2	PQ 25 Ost 57251; 40 km (25 mi) north-northwest of Kreuzburg	118	6 January 1945	11:31	Il-2	north of Doblin
94♠	14 September 1944	16:34	Il-2? (Note: According to Mathews and Foreman claimed as a Petlyakov Pe-2.)	PQ 25 Ost 37264; 15 km (9.3 mi) southwest of Riga	119	6 January 1945	11:33	Yak-9	north of Doblin
95♠	14 September 1944	16:36	Pe-2	PQ 25 Ost 37239; 15 km (9.3 mi) west of Riga	120	6 January 1945	11:46	Pe-2	north of Doblin
96♠	14 September 1944	16:36	Pe-2	PQ 25 Ost 37263; 15 km (9.3 mi) southwest of Riga	121	21 February 1945	13:40	Pe-2	55 km (34 mi) east-southeast of Libau
97♠	14 September 1944	16:40	Pe-2	PQ 25 Ost 47555; 35 km (22 mi) north-northwest of Pasewalk	122	23 February 1945	16:30	Pe-2	vicinity of Courland
98♠	14 September 1944	18:18	Il-2	PQ 25 Ost 47376; 45 km (28 mi) south of Riga	123	23 February 1945	16:31	Pe-2	vicinity of Courland
99♠	14 September 1944	18:20	Il-2	PQ 25 Ost 47394; 55 km (34 mi) south-southeast of Riga	124	5 March 1945	09:06	Pe-2	vicinity of Courland
100♠	14 September 1944	18:21	Il-2	PQ 25 Ost 47531; 40 km (25 mi) north of Pasewalk	125	5 March 1945	09:07	Pe-2	vicinity of Courland
101	15 September 1944	09:51	Il-2	PQ 25 Ost 47372; 45 km (28 mi) south of Riga	126	5 March 1945	14:12	Yak-3	vicinity of Courland
102	15 September 1944	10:00	Yak-9	PQ 25 Ost 47346; 35 km (22 mi) south-southeast of Riga	127	6 March 1945	15:52	Yak-3	vicinity of Courland
103	15 September 1944	13:40	P-39	PQ 25 Ost 47397; 55 km (34 mi) south-southeast of Riga	128	19 March 1945	12:17	Pe-2	vicinity of Courland
104	17 September 1944	09:40	Yak-9	PQ 25 Ost 47451; 45 km (28 mi) southwest of Mālpils	129	19 March 1945	12:27	Pe-2	vicinity of Courland

=== Awards ===
- Iron Cross (1939) 2nd and 1st Class
- Honor Goblet of the Luftwaffe on 13 September 1943 as Oberleutnant and pilot (Note: According to Obermaier on 31 August 1943.)
- German Cross in Gold on 16 January 1944 as Oberleutnant in the I./Jagdgeschwader 54
- Knight's Cross of the Iron Cross on 10 October 1944 as Hauptmann and Staffelkapitän of the 3./Jagdgeschwader 54 (Note: According to Scherzer as pilot in the II./Jagdgeschwader 54.)
