= Varrelbusch Airfield =

Varrelbusch Airfield (Advanced Landing Ground B-113)
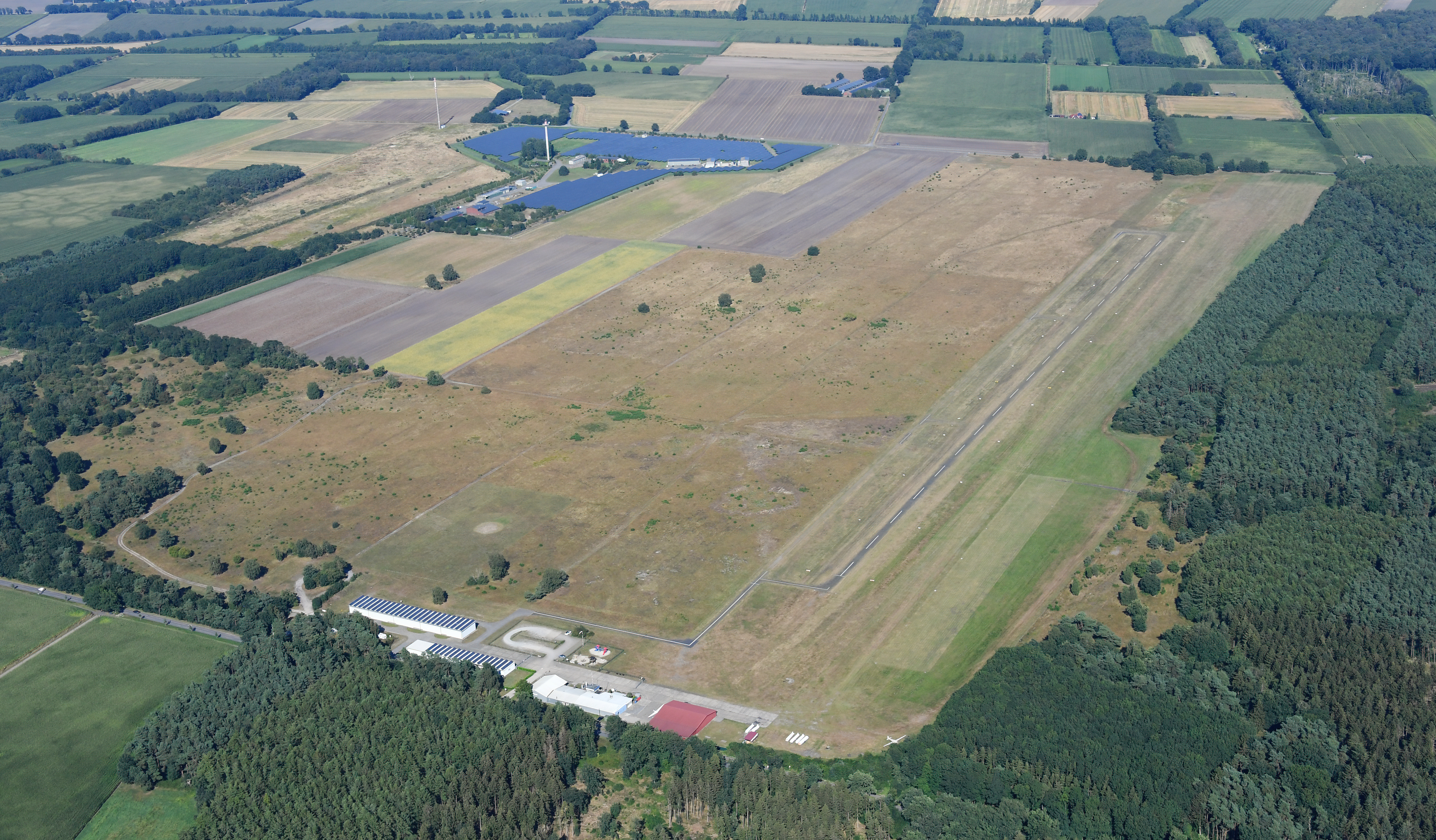
- IATA: VAC; ICAO: EDWU

Summary
- Airport type: Public
- Location: Cloppenburg, Germany
- Coordinates: 52°54′30″N 008°02′35″E

Map
- Location of Varrelbusch Aerodrome

Runways
Direction	Length		Surface
Direction	ft	m	Surface
09/27	2,297	700	Grass

Varrelbusch Airfield (IATA: VAC, ICAO: EDWU) is a regional aerodrome in Germany. It supports general aviation with no commercial airline service scheduled.

== History ==
During World War II, the airfield was used by the British Royal Air Force as Advanced Landing Ground B-113.
