= List of Knight's Cross of the Iron Cross recipients of the Luftwaffe fighter force =

The Knight's Cross of the Iron Cross (German: Ritterkreuz des Eisernen Kreuzes) and its variants were the highest military award in Nazi Germany. Recipients are grouped by grades of the Knight's Cross. During World War II, 453 German day and bomber destroyer pilots, 85 night fighter pilots, including 14 crew members, were awarded the Knight's Cross of the Iron Cross. Among them, 130 pilots received the Knight's Cross of the Iron Cross with Oak Leaves, 34 the Knight's Cross of the Iron Cross with Oak Leaves and Swords, and nine won the Knight's Cross of the Iron Cross with Oak Leaves Swords and Diamonds; 58 presentations were made posthumously.

== Background ==
The Knight's Cross of the Iron Cross and its higher grades were based on four separate enactments. The first enactment, Reichsgesetzblatt I S. 1573 of 1 September 1939 instituted the Iron Cross (Eisernes Kreuz), the Knight's Cross of the Iron Cross and the Grand Cross of the Iron Cross (Großkreuz des Eisernen Kreuzes). Article 2 of the enactment mandated that the award of a higher class be preceded by the award of all preceding classes. As the war progressed, some of the recipients of the Knight's Cross distinguished themselves further and a higher grade, the Knight's Cross of the Iron Cross with Oak Leaves (Ritterkreuz des Eisernen Kreuzes mit Eichenlaub), was instituted. The Oak Leaves, as they were commonly referred to, were based on the enactment Reichsgesetzblatt I S. 849 of 3 June 1940. In 1941, two higher grades of the Knight's Cross were instituted. The enactment Reichsgesetzblatt I S. 613 of 28 September 1941 introduced the Knight's Cross of the Iron Cross with Oak Leaves and Swords (Ritterkreuz des Eisernen Kreuzes mit Eichenlaub und Schwertern) and the Knight's Cross of the Iron Cross with Oak Leaves, Swords and Diamonds (Ritterkreuz des Eisernen Kreuzes mit Eichenlaub, Schwertern und Brillanten). At the end of 1944 the final grade, the Knight's Cross of the Iron Cross with Golden Oak Leaves, Swords, and Diamonds (Ritterkreuz des Eisernen Kreuzes mit goldenem Eichenlaub, Schwertern und Brillanten), based on the enactment Reichsgesetzblatt 1945 I S. 11 of 29 December 1944, became the final variant of the Knight's Cross authorized.

== Recipients ==
Knight's Cross of the Iron Cross
Year	Number of presentations	Posthumous presentations
1940	48	1
1941	81	2
1942	122	5
1943	69	8
1944	148	15
1945	55	3

The Oberkommando der Wehrmacht kept separate Knight's Cross lists, one for each of the three military branches, Heer (Army), Kriegsmarine (Navy), Luftwaffe (Air force) and for the Waffen-SS. Within each of these lists a unique sequential number was assigned to each recipient. The same numbering paradigm was applied to the higher grades of the Knight's Cross, one list per grade.

This along with the + (plus) indicates that a higher grade of Knight's Cross was awarded as well.
This along with the * (asterisk) indicates that the Knight's Cross was awarded posthumously.
This along with the ! (exclamation mark) indicates that author Walther-Peer Fellgiebel has expressed doubt regarding the veracity and formal correctness of the listing.
This along with the ? (question mark) indicates that historian Veit Scherzer has expressed doubt regarding the veracity and formal correctness of the listing.

Name	Rank	Role and unit (Note: For an explanation of the various naming schemes used by the Luftwaffe, Heer, Kriegsmarine and Waffen-SS refer to nomenclature used by the Wehrmacht and Waffen-SS.)	Date of award	Notes	Image
Horst Ademeit+	Leutnant	Pilot in the I./Jagdgeschwader 54	16 April 1943	Awarded 414th Oak Leaves 2 March 1944	
Walter Adolph	Hauptmann	Gruppenkommandeur of the II./Jagdgeschwader 26 "Schlageter"	13 November 1940	—	
Heinrich-Wilhelm Ahnert	Oberfeldwebel	Pilot in the I./Jagdgeschwader 52 (Note: According to Scherzer in the 3./Jagdgeschwader 52.)	23 August 1942*	Killed in action 23 August 1942	—
Egon Albrecht (Note: According to Scherzer last name is Albrecht-Lemke.)	Oberleutnant	Staffelführer of the 9./Zerstörergeschwader 76 (Note: According to Scherzer as Staffelkapitän of the 6./Zerstörergeschwader 1.)	22 May 1943	—	
Hans-Heinz Augenstein	Oberleutnant	Staffelführer of the 7./Nachtjagdgeschwader 1	9 June 1944	—	—
Sophus Baagoe	Oberleutnant	Pilot in the 5./Zerstörergeschwader 26 "Horst Wessel"	14 June 1941*	Killed in action 14 May 1941	—
Werner Baake	Oberleutnant	Staffelkapitän of the 3./Nachtjagdgeschwader 1 (Note: According to Scherzer as Staffelkapitän of the 2./Nachtjagdgeschwader 1.)	27 July 1944	—	—
Herbert Bachnick	Fahnenjunker-Feldwebel	Pilot in the 9./Jagdgeschwader 52	27 July 1944	—	—
Johann Badum	Leutnant	Pilot in the 6./Jagdgeschwader 77	15 October 1942	—	
Heinrich (Heinz) Bär+	Leutnant (Note: According to Scherzer as Leutnant of the Reserves.)	Pilot in the 1./Jagdgeschwader 51	2 July 1941	Awarded 31st Oak Leaves 14 August 1941; 7th Swords 16 February 1942	
Günther Bahr	Oberfeldwebel	Pilot in the I./Nachtjagdgeschwader 6	28 March 1945	—	—
Wilhelm Balthasar+	Hauptmann	Staffelkapitän of the 7./Jagdgeschwader 27 (Note: According to Scherzer as Staffelkapitän of the 1./Jagdgeschwader 1.)	14 June 1940	Awarded 17th Oak Leaves 2 July 1941	
Gerhard Barkhorn+	Oberleutnant	Staffelkapitän of the 4./Jagdgeschwader 52	23 August 1942	Awarded 175th Oak Leaves 11 January 1943; 52nd Swords 2 March 1944	
Heinrich Bartels	Unteroffizier	Pilot in the 8./Jagdgeschwader 5	13 November 1942	—	—
Franz Barten	Oberleutnant	Staffelkapitän of the 9./Jagdgeschwader 53 (Note: According to Scherzer on 24 October 1944 as Staffelkapitän in the III./Jagdgeschwader 53.)	29 October 1944*	Killed in action 4 August 1944	—
Wilhelm Batz+	Oberleutnant	Staffelkapitän of the 5./Jagdgeschwader 52	26 March 1944	Awarded 526th Oak Leaves 20 July 1944 (145th) Swords 21 April 1945	
Konrad Bauer	Feldwebel	Pilot in the 5./Jagdgeschwader 300	31 October 1944	—	
Viktor Bauer+	Oberleutnant	Staffelkapitän of the 9./Jagdgeschwader 3 (Note: According to Scherzer as Oberleutnant and pilot in the III./Jagdgeschwader 3)	30 July 1941	Awarded 107th Oak Leaves 26 July 1942	
Ludwig Becker+	Oberleutnant (Note: According to Scherzer as Oberleutnant of the Reserves and Staffelkapitän of the 6./Nachtjagdgeschwader 1.)	Staffelkapitän of the 12./Nachtjagdgeschwader 1	1 July 1942	Awarded 198th Oak Leaves 26 February 1943	—
Martin Becker+	Oberleutnant	Pilot in the IV./Nachtjagdgeschwader 6 (Note: According to Scherzer as a pilot in the II./Nachtjagdgeschwader 6.)	1 April 1944	Awarded 792nd Oak Leaves 20 March 1945	—
Friedrich Beckh	Major	Geschwaderkommodore of Jagdgeschwader 51	18 September 1941	—	A man wearing a military uniform, peaked cap, and an Iron Cross displayed at the front of his uniform collar.
Franz-Josef Beerenbrock+	Unteroffizier	Pilot in the 10./Jagdgeschwader 51	6 October 1941	Awarded 108th Oak Leaves 3 August 1942	
Wilhelm Beier	Oberfeldwebel	Pilot in the 3./Nachtjagdgeschwader 2	10 October 1941	—	
Hans Beißwenger+	Leutnant	Pilot in the 6./Jagdgeschwader 54	9 May 1942	Awarded 130th Oak Leaves 30 September 1942	—
Helmut Belser	Hauptmann	Staffelkapitän of the 3./Jagdgeschwader 53 (Note: According to Scherzer as Staffelkapitän of the 8./Jagdgeschwader 53.)	6 September 1942	—	—
Karl-Heinz Bendert	Oberfeldwebel	Pilot in the 5./Jagdgeschwader 27 (Note: According to Scherzer as a pilot in the II./Jagdgeschwader 27.)	30 December 1942	—	—
[Dr.] Helmut Bennemann (Note: The brackets around the doctor title [Dr.] denotes that the academic title was attained after the Knight's Cross of the Iron Cross was awarded.)	Hauptmann	Gruppenkommandeur of the I./Jagdgeschwader 52	2 October 1942	—	—
[Dr.] Anton Benning	Leutnant	Staffelkapitän of the 1./Jagdgeschwader 301	13 April 1945	—	—
Helmut Bergmann	Hauptmann	Staffelkapitän of the 8./Nachtjagdgeschwader 4	9 June 1944	—	—
Heinz-Edgar Berres	Oberleutnant	Staffelkapitän of the 1./Jagdgeschwader 77	19 September 1943*	Killed in action 25 July 1943	—
Otto Bertram	Hauptmann	Gruppenkommandeur of the III./Jagdgeschwader 2 "Richthofen"	28 October 1940	—	
Franz Beyer	Oberleutnant	Staffelkapitän of the 8./Jagdgeschwader 3 (Note: According to Scherzer as a pilot in the 8./Jagdgeschwader 3.)	30 August 1941	—	
Hans-Joachim Birkner	Fahnenjunker-Feldwebel	Pilot in the 9./Jagdgeschwader 52 (Note: According to Scherzer as a pilot in the III./Jagdgeschwader 52.)	27 July 1944	—	—
Emil Bitsch	Oberleutnant	Staffelkapitän of the 8./Jagdgeschwader 3 "Udet"	29 August 1943	—	—
Joachim Blechschmidt	Major	Gruppenkommandeur of the I./Zerstörergeschwader 1	17 March 1943	—	
Hans-Ekkehard Bob	Oberleutnant	Staffelkapitän of the 9./Jagdgeschwader 54	7 March 1941	—	
Ernst Börngen	Hauptmann	Staffelkapitän of the 5./Jagdgeschwader 27 (Note: According to Scherzer on 27 July 1944 as Gruppenkommandeur of the I./Jagdgeschwader 27.)	3 August 1944	—	—
Wolfgang Böwing-Treuding	Oberleutnant	Staffelführer of the 10./Jagdgeschwader 51 "Mölders" (Note: According to Scherzer as Staffelkapitän of the 10./Jagdgeschwader 51 "Mölders".)	24 March 1943*	Killed in action 11 February 1943	—
Eckart-Wilhelm von Bonin	Hauptmann	Gruppenkommandeur of the II./Nachtjagdgeschwader 1	5 February 1944	—	—
Hubertus von Bonin	Major	Gruppenkommandeur of the III./Jagdgeschwader 52	21 December 1942	—	—
Adolf Borchers	Hauptmann	Staffelkapitän of the 11./Jagdgeschwader 51 "Mölders"	22 November 1943	—	—
Walter Borchers	Major	Geschwaderkommodore of Nachtjagdgeschwader 5 (Note: According to Scherzer on 29 October 1944 as Gruppenkommandeur of the III./Nachtjagdgeschwader 5.)	27 July 1944	—	—
Eberhard von Boremski	Oberfeldwebel	Pilot in the 7./Jagdgeschwader 3 "Udet" (Note: According to Scherzer as a pilot in the 9./Jagdgeschwader 3 "Udet".)	3 May 1942	—	—
Karl Borris	Major	Gruppenkommandeur of the I./Jagdgeschwader 26 "Schlageter"	25 November 1944	—	—
Kurt Brändle+	Hauptmann	Gruppenkommandeur of the II./Jagdgeschwader 3 "Udet"	1 July 1942	Awarded 114th Oak Leaves 27 August 1942	
Paul Brandt	Oberfeldwebel	Pilot in the IV./Jagdgeschwader 54	5 September 1944	—	—
Walter Brandt	Oberfeldwebel	Pilot in the I./Jagdgeschwader 77 (Note: According to Scherzer as a pilot in the 2./Jagdgeschwader 77.)	24 March 1943	—	
Joachim Brendel+	Oberleutnant	Staffelkapitän of the 1./Jagdgeschwader 51 "Mölders"	22 November 1943	Awarded 697th Oak Leaves 14 January 1945	—
Heinz Bretnütz	Hauptmann	Gruppenkommandeur of the II./Jagdgeschwader 53	21 October 1940 (Note: According to Scherzer on 22 October 1940.)	—	
Klaus Bretschneider	Leutnant	Pilot in the 5./Jagdgeschwader 300 (Note: According to Scherzer as a pilot in the 5.(Sturm)/Jagdgeschwader 300.)	18 November 1944	—	—
Hugo Broch	Feldwebel	Pilot in the 8./Jagdgeschwader 54	12 March 1945	—	—
Jürgen Brocke	Leutnant	Pilot in the 4./Jagdgeschwader 77	9 December 1942*	Killed in action 15 September 1942	A man sitting in folding chair wearing a military uniform, a peaked cap is resting on his knees.
Herbert Broennle	Oberfeldwebel	Pilot in the 4./Jagdgeschwader 54 (Note: According to Scherzer as a pilot in the 2./Jagdgeschwader 54.)	14 March 1943	—	—
Albert Brunner	Oberfeldwebel	Pilot in the 6./Jagdgeschwader 5	3 July 1943*	Killed in action 7 May 1943	
Max Bucholz (Note: According to Scherzer his name is spelled Max Buchholz who received the Knight's Cross of the Iron Cross as a pilot in the Stab I./Jagdgeschwader 3.)	Oberleutnant	Staffelkapitän in the I./Jagdgeschwader 3	12 August 1941	—	
Kurt Bühligen+	Oberfeldwebel	Pilot in the II./Jagdgeschwader 2 "Richthofen" (Note: According to Scherzer in the 4./Jagdgeschwader 2 "Richthofen".)	4 September 1941	Awarded 413th Oak Leaves 2 March 1944; 88th Swords 14 August 1944	
Harry von Bülow-Bothkamp	Oberstleutnant of the Reserves	Geschwaderkommodore of Jagdgeschwader 2 "Richthofen"	22 August 1940	—	
Kurt Bundrock	Oberfeldwebel	Radio/wireless operator in the Stab/Nachtjagdgeschwader 1 (Note: According to Scherzer on 24 June 1944 in the Stab/Nachtjagdgeschwader 1 [for his achievements as a radio/wireless operator with Geschwaderkommodore Major Werner Streib].)	30 June 1944	—	—
Johannes Bunzek	Leutnant	Pilot in the 7./Jagdgeschwader 52	6 April 1944*	Killed in action 11 December 1943	—
Lutz-Wilhelm Burckhardt (Note: According to Scherzer his name is Ludwig-Wilhelm Burkhardt who received the Knight's Cross of the Iron Cross as a pilot in the 6./Jagdgeschwader 77.)	Leutnant	Pilot in the 4./Jagdgeschwader 77	15 October 1942	—	—
Horst Carganico	Oberleutnant	Staffelkapitän of the 6./Jagdgeschwader 5 (Note: According to Scherzer as Staffelkapitän of the 1./Jagdgeschwader 77.)	25 September 1941	—	—
Georg Christl	Hauptmann	Gruppenkommandeur of the III./Zerstörergeschwader 26 "Horst Wessel"	18 March 1942	—	—
Erwin Clausen+	Oberleutnant	Staffelkapitän of the 6./Jagdgeschwader 77 (Note: According to Scherzer on 22 May 1942 as a pilot in the 1./Jagdgeschwader 77)	19 May 1942	Awarded 106th Oak Leaves 23 July 1942	
Wilhelm Crinius+	Feldwebel	Pilot in the 3./Jagdgeschwader 53	23 September 1942	Awarded 127th Oak Leaves 23 September 1942	
Paul-Heinrich Dähne	Oberleutnant	Staffelkapitän of the 12./Jagdgeschwader 11 (previously 2./Jagdgeschwader 52) (Note: According to Scherzer on 8 April 1944 as Staffelkapitän of the 2./Jagdgeschwader 52.)	6 April 1944	—	—
Walther Dahl+	Major	Gruppenkommandeur of the III./Jagdgeschwader 3 "Udet"	11 March 1944	Awarded 724th Oak Leaves 1 February 1945	—
Hugo Dahmer	Oberfeldwebel	Pilot in the 6./Jagdgeschwader 5 (Note: According to Scherzer on 30 July 1941 as pilot in the I./Jagdgeschwader 77.)	1 August 1941	—	—
Hans Dammers	Feldwebel	Pilot in the 9./Jagdgeschwader 52 (Note: According to Scherzer as pilot in the 7./Jagdgeschwader 52.)	23 August 1942	—	—
Rudi Dassow	Leutnant	Pilot in the II./Zerstörergeschwader 26 "Horst Wessel"	5 September 1944*	Killed in action 25 August 1944	—
Gustav Denk	Oberleutnant	Pilot in the Stab II./Jagdgeschwader 52	14 March 1943*	Killed in action 13 February 1943	—
Oskar Dettke	Hauptmann	Staffelkapitän of the 9./Kampfgeschwader 55	7 April 1945	—	—
Adolf Dickfeld+	Leutnant	Pilot in the 7./Jagdgeschwader 52	19 March 1942	Awarded 94th Oak Leaves 19 May 1942 (Note: According to Scherzer on 18 May 1942.)	—
Ulrich Diesing	Major	Geschwaderkommodore of Zerstörergeschwader 1	6 September 1942	—	—
Fritz Dinger	Leutnant	Staffelführer of the 4./Jagdgeschwader 53	23 December 1942	—	—
Anton Döbele	Oberfeldwebel	Pilot in the 3./Jagdgeschwader 54 (Note: According to Scherzer as pilot in the 1./Jagdgeschwader 54.)	26 March 1944*	Killed in action 11 November 1943	—
Hans Döbrich	Feldwebel	Pilot in the 6./Jagdgeschwader 5	19 September 1943	—	—
Arnold Döring	Leutnant	Pilot in the 10./Nachtjagdgeschwader 3	17 April 1945	—	—
Franz Dörr	Hauptmann (Note: According to Scherzer as Oberleutnant and Staffelkapitän of the 7./Jagdgeschwader 5.)	Gruppenkommandeur of the III./Jagdgeschwader 5	19 August 1944	—	—
Kurt Dombacher? (Note: Kurt Dombacher's nomination by the troop was processed by the Oberkommando der Luftwaffe/Auszeichnung und Disziplin (OKL/AuD—Air Force High Command/Award and Discipline) on 15 April 1945. This nomination, now recommending approval, was forwarded on 16 April with a Luftwaffenpersonalamt-Verleihungsvorschlag (LPA-VV—Air Force Staff Office Nomination Recommendation) Nr. 1576 to the adjutancy of Hermann Göring. The nomination was never finalized and was left unfinished by the end of the war. A presentation of the Knight's Cross of the Iron Cross cannot be verified. The presentation date of 7 April 1945 as listed by Ernst Obermaier, author of Die Ritterkreuzträger der Luftwaffe Jagdflieger 1939–1945—The Bearers of the Knight's Cross of the Fighter Force 1939–1945, must be incorrect. The presentation date of 8 April 1945 as listed by the Walther-Peer Fellgiebel is an assumption of the Association of Knight's Cross Recipients.)	Leutnant	Pilot in the 1./Jagdgeschwader 51 "Mölders"	8 April 1945	—	—
Hans Dortenmann	Oberleutnant	Staffelkapitän of the 3./Jagdgeschwader 26 "Schlageter"	20 April 1945	—	—
Martin Drewes+	Hauptmann	Gruppenkommandeur of the III./Nachtjagdgeschwader 1 (Note: According to Scherzer as leader of the III./Nachtjagdgeschwader 1.)	27 July 1944	Awarded 839th Oak Leaves 17 April 1945	
Ernst-Georg Drünkler	Hauptmann	Staffelkapitän of the 1./Nachtjagdgeschwader 5	20 March 1945	—	—
Ernst Düllberg	Major	Gruppenkommandeur of the III./Jagdgeschwader 27	20 July 1944	—	—
Peter Düttmann	Leutnant	Pilot in the 5./Jagdgeschwader 52	9 June 1944	—	—
Heinz Ebeling	Leutnant	Staffelkapitän of the 9./Jagdgeschwader 26 "Schlageter" (Note: According to Scherzer as pilot in the 9./Jagdgeschwader 26 "Schlageter".)	5 November 1940	—	
Kurt Ebener	Feldwebel	Pilot in the 4./Jagdgeschwader 3 "Udet"	7 April 1943	—	—
Reinhold Eckardt	Oberleutnant	Adjutant of the II./Nachtjagdgeschwader 1	30 August 1941	—	—
Franz Eckerle+	Hauptmann	Staffelkapitän of the 1./Jagdgeschwader 54	18 September 1941	Awarded 82nd Oak Leaves 12 March 1942	
Georg-Peter Eder+	Oberleutnant	Staffelkapitän of the 6./Jagdgeschwader 1	24 June 1944	Awarded 663rd Oak Leaves 25 November 1944	—
Walter Ehle	Major	Gruppenkommandeur of the II./Nachtjagdgeschwader 1	29 August 1943	—	—
Hans Ehlers	Oberleutnant	Staffelkapitän of the 3./Jagdgeschwader 1 "Oesau"	9 June 1944	—	—
Rudolf Ehrenberger	Oberfeldwebel	Pilot in the 6./Jagdgeschwader 53	6 April 1944* (Note: According to Scherzer on 5 April 1944.)	Killed in action 8 March 1944	—
Heinrich Ehrler+	Leutnant	Pilot in the 6./Jagdgeschwader 5	4 September 1942	Awarded 265th Oak Leaves 2 August 1943	
Diethelm von Eichel-Streiber	Hauptmann	Staffelkapitän of the Stab/Jagdgeschwader 51 "Mölders" (Note: According to Scherzer as Staffelkapitän of the Stabs-Staffel/Jagdgeschwader 51 "Mölders".)	5 April 1944	—	—
Franz Eisenach	Hauptmann	Staffelkapitän of the 3./Jagdgeschwader 54 (Note: According to Scherzer as pilot in the II./Jagdgeschwader 54.)	10 October 1944	—	—
Walter Engel	Hauptmann	Staffelkapitän of the 3./Nachtjagdgeschwader 5	28 February 1945	—	—
Siegfried Engfer	Feldwebel	Pilot in the III./Jagdgeschwader 3 "Udet"	2 October 1942	—	
Wolf-Udo Ettel+	Leutnant	Staffelführer of the 4./Jagdgeschwader 3 "Udet" (Note: According to Scherzer as pilot and not Staffelführer in the 4./Jagdgeschwader 3 "Udet".)	1 June 1943	Awarded 289th Oak Leaves 31 August 1943	—
Heinz Ewald	Leutnant	Pilot in the 5./Jagdgeschwader 52	20 April 1945	—	—
Wolfgang Ewald	Major	Gruppenkommandeur of the III./Jagdgeschwader 3 "Udet"	9 December 1942	—	—
Wolfgang Falck	Major	Geschwaderkommodore of Nachtjagdgeschwader 1	1 October 1940	—	
Horst-Günther von Fassong	Hauptmann	Gruppenkommandeur of the III./Jagdgeschwader 11	27 July 1944	—	—
Leopold Fellerer	Hauptmann	Gruppenkommandeur of the II./Nachtjagdgeschwader 5	8 April 1944	—	—
Günter Fink	Oberleutnant	Pilot in the 8./Jagdgeschwader 54	14 March 1943	—	—
Erwin Fleig	Leutnant	Pilot in the 2./Jagdgeschwader 51 (Note: According to Scherzer as I./Jagdgeschwader 51.)	12 August 1941	—	
Otto Fönnekold	Fahnenjunker-Feldwebel	Pilot in the II./Jagdgeschwader 52	26 March 1944	—	—
Josef Fözö	Hauptmann	Gruppenkommandeur of the II./Jagdgeschwader 51	2 July 1941	—	—
Gustav Francsi	Leutnant	Pilot in the I./Nachtjagdgeschwader 100 (Note: According to Scherzer as pilot in the 1./Nachtjagdgeschwader 100.)	29 October 1944	—	—
Hans-Dieter Frank+	Hauptmann	Staffelkapitän of the 2./Nachtjagdgeschwader 1	20 June 1943	Awarded 417th Oak Leaves 2 March 1944	—
Rudolf Frank+	Feldwebel	Pilot in the 2./Nachtjagdgeschwader 3	6 April 1944	Awarded 531st Oak Leaves 20 July 1944	—
Alfred Franke	Oberfeldwebel	Pilot in the 2./Jagdgeschwader 53	29 October 1942*	Killed in action 9 September 1942	—
[Prof. Dr.] Ludwig Franzisket (Note: The brackets around the professor and doctor title [Prof. Dr.] denotes that the academic title was attained after the Knight's Cross of the Iron Cross was awarded.)	Oberleutnant	Adjutant of the I./Jagdgeschwader 27	20 July 1941 (Note: According to Scherzer on 23 July 1941.)	—	—
Wilhelm Freuwörth	Feldwebel	Pilot in the 2./Jagdgeschwader 52	5 January 1943	—	—
Hugo Frey	Hauptmann	Staffelkapitän of the 7./Jagdgeschwader 11	4 May 1944*	Killed in action 6 March 1944	—
Siegfried Freytag	Oberleutnant	Pilot in the I./Jagdgeschwader 77 (Note: According to Scherzer as pilot in the II./Jagdgeschwader 77.)	3 July 1942	—	—
Herbert Friebel	Oberfeldwebel	Pilot in the 12./Jagdgeschwader 51 "Mölders"	24 January 1943	—	—
Gerhard Friedrich	Major	Gruppenkommandeur of the I./Nachtjagdgeschwader 6	15 March 1945	—	—
Gustav Frielinghaus	Hauptmann (Note: According to Scherzer as Oberleutnant in the Stab IV./Jagdgeschwader 3.)	Gruppenkommandeur of the IV./Jagdgeschwader 3 "Udet"	5 February 1944	—	—
Hans Fuß	Leutnant	Pilot in the II./Jagdgeschwader 3 "Udet"	23 August 1942	—	—
Wilhelm Gänsler	Oberfeldwebel	Air gunner in the Stabsstaffel IV./Nachtjagdgeschwader 1 (Note: According to Scherzer as air gunner in the Stab IV./Nachtjagdgeschwader 1.)	27 July 1944	—	—
Otto Gaiser	Oberfeldwebel	Pilot in the 10./Jagdgeschwader 51 "Mölders"	9 June 1944*	Missing in action assumed killed in action 22 January 1944	—
Adolf Galland+	Major	Gruppenkommandeur of the III./Jagdgeschwader 26 "Schlageter"	29 July 1940	Awarded 3rd Oak Leaves 24 September 1940; 1st Swords 21 June 1941; 2nd Diamonds 28 January 1942	
Wilhelm-Ferdinand Galland	Hauptmann	Gruppenkommandeur of the II./Jagdgeschwader 26 "Schlageter"	18 May 1943	—	—
Bernd Gallowitsch	Leutnant	Pilot in the 12./Jagdgeschwader 51 "Mölders"	24 January 1942	—	—
August Geiger+	Oberleutnant	Staffelkapitän of the 7./Nachtjagdgeschwader 1	22 May 1943	Awarded 416th Oak Leaves 2 March 1944	—
Friedrich Geißhardt+	Leutnant	Pilot in the I./Jagdgeschwader 77 (Note: According to Scherzer as pilot and adjutant in the Stab I.(Jagd)/Lehrgeschwader 2.)	30 August 1941	Awarded 101st Oak Leaves 23 June 1942	
Werner Gerth	Oberleutnant	Staffelkapitän of the Sturmstaffel in the IV./Jagdgeschwader 3 "Udet" (Note: According to Scherzer as Staffelkapitän of the 14.(Sturm)/Jagdgeschwader 3 "Udet".)	29 October 1944	—	—
Paul Gildner+	Oberfeldwebel	Pilot in the 3./Nachtjagdgeschwader 1 (Note: According to Scherzer as pilot in the 4./Nachtjagdgeschwader 1.)	9 July 1941	Awarded 196th Oak Leaves 26 February 1943	—
Adolf Glunz+	Oberfeldwebel	Pilot in the 4./Jagdgeschwader 26 "Schlageter"	29 August 1943	Awarded 508th Oak Leaves 24 June 1944	
Franz Götz	Oberleutnant	Staffelkapitän of the 9./Jagdgeschwader 53	4 September 1942	—	—
Hans Götz	Oberleutnant	Pilot in the 2./Jagdgeschwader 54 (Note: According to Scherzer as pilot in the I./Jagdgeschwader 54.)	23 December 1942	—	—
Heinz Golinski	Unteroffizier	Pilot in the 3./Jagdgeschwader 53 (Note: According to Scherzer as pilot in the I./Jagdgeschwader 53.)	30 October 1942*	Killed in action 16 October 1942	—
Gordon Gollob+	Hauptmann	Gruppenkommandeur of the II./Jagdgeschwader 3	18 September 1941	Awarded 38th Oak Leaves 26 October 1941; 13th Swords 23 June 1942; 3rd Diamonds 30 August 1942 (Note: According to Scherzer Oak Leaves awarded on 25 October 1941.)	
Kurt Goltzsch	Leutnant	Pilot in the 5./Jagdgeschwader 2 "Richthofen"	5 February 1944	—	—
Heinz Gossow	Oberfeldwebel	Pilot in the 1./Jagdgeschwader 302 (Note: According to Scherzer on 24 October 1944 as pilot in the I./Jagdgeschwader 302.)	28 October 1944	—	—
Walter Grabmann	Oberstleutnant	Geschwaderkommodore of Zerstörergeschwader 76	14 September 1940	—	
Hermann Graf+	Leutnant of the Reserves	Pilot in the 9./Jagdgeschwader 52	24 January 1942	Awarded 93rd Oak Leaves 17 May 1942; 11th Swords 19 May 1942; 5th Diamonds 16 September 1942 (Note: According to Scherzer Swords awarded on 18 May 1944.)	
Hartmann Grasser+	Oberleutnant	Pilot in the II./Jagdgeschwader 51 (Note: According to Scherzer as pilot in the Stab/Jagdgeschwader 51.)	4 September 1941	Awarded 288th Oak Leaves 31 August 1943	—
Berthold Graßmuck	Oberfeldwebel	Pilot in the 2./Jagdgeschwader 52 (Note: According to Scherzer as pilot in the 1./Jagdgeschwader 52.)	19 September 1942	—	—
Karl Gratz	Unteroffizier	Pilot in the 8./Jagdgeschwader 52	1 July 1942	—	—
Hermann Greiner+	Oberleutnant	Staffelkapitän of the 11./Nachtjagdgeschwader 1	27 July 1944	Awarded 840th Oak Leaves 17 April 1945	—
Heinz Grimm	Leutnant	Pilot in the IV./Nachtjagdgeschwader 1 (Note: According to Scherzer as pilot in the Stab IV./Nachtjagdgeschwader 1.)	5 February 1944*	Died of wounds 13 October 1943	—
Alfred Grislawski+	Feldwebel	Pilot in the 9./Jagdgeschwader 52	1 July 1942	Awarded 446th Oak Leaves 11 April 1944	—
Helmut Grollmus	Leutnant	Pilot in the II./Jagdgeschwader 54 (Note: According to Scherzer as pilot in the 4./Jagdgeschwader 54.)	6 October 1944*	Killed in action 19 June 1944	—
Fritz Gromotka	Leutnant (Note: According to Scherzer as Leutnant of the Reserves.)	Staffelkapitän of the 9./Jagdgeschwader 27	28 January 1945	—	—
Alfred Groß? (Note: The information regarding the presentation of the Knight's Cross to Alfred Groß originally came from Ernst Obermaier and was given to Walther-Peer Fellgiebel, who accepted this. Fellgiebel included all Luftwaffe presentations without changes because the Luftwaffe presentations at the end of the war could not be verified. Scherzer states that he received information from an aviation historian, who has access to the original 1945 files of Jagdgeschwader 26 (JG 26), that, "Leutnant Alfred Groß, 5./JG 26 was not a Staffelführer of the 5. Staffel, nor a recipient of the Knight's Cross." Alfred Groß is listed by Obermaier. Von Seemen lists him with a vague presentation date of April 1945.)	Leutnant	Staffelführer of the 5./Jagdgeschwader 26 "Schlageter"	20 April 1945	—	—
Erich Groth	Hauptmann	Gruppenkommandeur of the II./Zerstörergeschwader 76	1 October 1940	—	
Hans Grünberg	Leutnant	Pilot in the 5./Jagdgeschwader 3 "Udet"	9 June 1944	—	—
Friedrich Haas	Leutnant	Staffelführer of the 5./Jagdgeschwader 52	26 April 1945*	Killed in action 9 April 1945	—
Horst Haase	Hauptmann	Gruppenkommandeur of the IV./Jagdgeschwader 3 "Udet" (Note: According to Scherzer as Staffelkapitän of the 16.(Sturm)/Jagdgeschwader 3 "Udet".)	24 October 1944	—	—
Wilhelm Hachfeld	Hauptmann	Gruppenkommandeur of the III./Zerstörergeschwader 2	29 October 1942	—	—
Anton Hackl+	Oberleutnant	Staffelkapitän of the 5./Jagdgeschwader 77	25 May 1942	Awarded 109th Oak Leaves 9 August 1942; 78th Swords 9 July 1944 (Note: According to Scherzer 109th Oak Leaves on 7 August 1942 and 78th Swords on 12 July 1944.)	
Heinz Hackler	Fahnenjunker-Oberfeldwebel	Pilot in the III./Jagdgeschwader 77	19 August 1944	—	—
Heinz-Martin Hadeball	Hauptmann	Gruppenkommandeur of the I./Nachtjagdgeschwader 6 (Note: According to Scherzer as Staffelkapitän of the 3./Nachtjagdgeschwader 6.)	27 July 1944	—	—
Ludwig Häfner	Leutnant	Pilot in the 6./Jagdgeschwader 3 "Udet" (Note: According to Scherzer as a pilot in the I./Jagdgeschwader 3 "Udet".)	21 December 1942*	Killed in action 10 November 1942	—
Anton Hafner+	Feldwebel	Pilot in the 6./Jagdgeschwader 51 "Mölders"	23 August 1942	Awarded 452nd Oak Leaves 11 April 1944	—
Johannes Hager	Hauptmann	Staffelkapitän in the II./Nachtjagdgeschwader 1 (Note: According to Scherzer as Staffelkapitän of the 2./Nachtjagdgeschwader 1.)	12 March 1945	—	—
Hans "Assi" Hahn+	Oberleutnant	Pilot of the 4./Jagdgeschwader 2 "Richthofen"	24 September 1940	Awarded 32nd Oak Leaves 14 August 1941	
Hans von Hahn	Hauptmann	Gruppenkommandeur of the I./Jagdgeschwader 3	9 July 1941	—	—
Hans Hahn	Leutnant	Pilot in the I./Nachtjagdgeschwader 2 (Note: According to Scherzer as pilot in the 3./Nachtjagdgeschwader 2.)	9 July 1941	—	—
[Dr.] Josef Haiböck	Hauptmann	Gruppenkommandeur of the I./Jagdgeschwader 3 "Udet" (Note: According to Scherzer as Gruppenkommandeur of the I./Jagdgeschwader 3 "Udet" [for his achievements as Staffelkapitän in the I./Jagdgeschwader 52].)	9 June 1944	—	—
Karl Hammerl	Oberfeldwebel	Pilot in the 1./Jagdgeschwader 52	19 September 1942	—	—
Erich Handke	Fahnenjunker-Feldwebel	Radio/wireless operator in the IV./Nachtjagdgeschwader 1 (Note: According to Scherzer as radio/wireless operator in the Stab III./Nachtjagdgeschwader 1.)	27 July 1944	—	—
Günther Hannak	Leutnant	Pilot in the I./Jagdgeschwader 77	1 July 1942	—	
Horst Hannig+	Leutnant	Pilot in the 6./Jagdgeschwader 54 (Note: According to Scherzer as pilot in the 5./Jagdgeschwader 54.)	9 May 1942	Awarded 364th Oak Leaves 3 January 1944	—
Jürgen Harang	Oberleutnant	Staffelkapitän in the II./Jagdgeschwader 77	2 February 1945	—	—
Jürgen Harder+	Hauptmann (Note: According to Scherzer as Oberleutnant and Staffelführer in the III./Jagdgeschwader 53.)	Staffelkapitän in the III./Jagdgeschwader 53	5 December 1943	Awarded 727th Oak Leaves 1 February 1945	—
Erich Hartmann+	Leutnant	Pilot in the 9./Jagdgeschwader 52 (Note: According to Scherzer as pilot in the pilot in the 7./Jagdgeschwader 52.)	29 October 1943	Awarded 420th Oak Leaves 2 March 1944; 75th Swords 2 July 1944; 18th Diamonds 25 August 1944	
Helmut Haugk	Oberfeldwebel	Pilot in the 9./Zerstörergeschwader 26 "Horst Wessel" (Note: According to Scherzer as pilot in the 9./Zerstörergeschwader 26.)	21 December 1942	—	A smiling man wearing a military uniform and an Iron Cross displayed at the front of his uniform collar.
Werner Haugk	Fahnenjunker-Oberfeldwebel	Pilot in the 4./Zerstörergeschwader 76 (Note: According to Scherzer as pilot in the Stab./Zerstörergeschwader 76.)	8 August 1944	—	—
Alfred Heckmann	Oberfeldwebel	Pilot in the 4./Jagdgeschwader 3 "Udet" (Note: According to Scherzer as pilot in the 5./Jagdgeschwader 3 "Udet".)	19 September 1942	—	—
Anton Heinemann	Fahnenjunker-Feldwebel	Radio/wireless operator in the I./Nachtjagdgeschwader 2	17 April 1945	—	—
Richard Heller	Oberfeldwebel	Pilot in the III./Zerstörergeschwader 26 "Horst Wessel"	21 August 1941	—	A man wearing a military uniform, side cap, various military decorations including an Iron Cross displayed at the front of his uniform collar.
Wilhelm Herget+	Hauptmann (Note: According to Scherzer as Hauptmann of the Reserves.)	Gruppenkommandeur of the I./Nachtjagdgeschwader 4	20 June 1943	Awarded 451st Oak Leaves 11 April 1944	—
Rolf Hermichen+	Hauptmann	Gruppenkommandeur of the I./Jagdgeschwader 11	26 March 1944	Awarded 748th Oak Leaves 19 February 1945	—
Hajo Herrmann+	Oberleutnant	Staffelkapitän of the 7./Kampfgeschwader 4 "General Wever"	13 October 1940	Awarded 269th Oak Leaves 2 August 1943; 43rd Swords 23 January 1944	Black-and-white portrait of a man wearing a military uniform with an Iron Cross displayed at his neck.
Hans-Joachim Heyer	Leutnant	Pilot in the III./Jagdgeschwader 54	25 November 1942*	Killed in action 9 November 1942	—
Ernst-Erich Hirschfeld	Oberleutnant	Pilot in the 5./Jagdgeschwader 300 (Note: According to Scherzer as pilot in the 6./Jagdgeschwader 300.)	24 October 1944*	Killed in action 28 July 1944	—
Heinz-Horst Hißbach	Hauptmann	Gruppenkommandeur of the II./Nachtjagdgeschwader 2	15 April 1945*	Killed in action 14 April 1945	—
Walter Hoeckner	Hauptmann	Gruppenkommandeur of the I./Jagdgeschwader 4 (Note: According to Scherzer as Gruppenkommandeur of the II./Jagdgeschwader 1.)	6 April 1944	—	—
Heinrich Höfemeier	Oberfeldwebel	Pilot in the 1./Jagdgeschwader 51 "Mölders"	5 April 1942	—	—
Anton Hörwick	Oberfeldwebel	Pilot in the 7./Nachtjagdgeschwader 2 (Note: According to Scherzer as pilot in the I./Nachtjagdgeschwader 7.)	8 August 1944	—	—
Gerhard Hoffmann	Fahnenjunker-Feldwebel	Pilot in the 4./Jagdgeschwader 52 (Note: According to Scherzer as pilot in the 5./Jagdgeschwader 52.)	14 May 1944	—	—
Heinrich Hoffmann+	Oberfeldwebel	Pilot in the 12./Jagdgeschwader 51	12 August 1941	Awarded 36th Oak Leaves 19 October 1941	—
Reinhold Hoffmann	Leutnant (Note: According to Scherzer as Leutnant of the Reserves and pilot in the III./Jagdgeschwader 54.)	Pilot in the 6./Jagdgeschwader 54	28 January 1945*	Killed in flying accident 24 May 1944	—
Werner Hoffmann	Hauptmann	Gruppenkommandeur of the I./Nachtjagdgeschwader 5	4 May 1944	—	—
Karl-Wilhelm Hofmann	Leutnant	Pilot in the 8./Jagdgeschwader 26 "Schlageter" (Note: According to Scherzer as Staffelkapitän in the II./Jagdgeschwader 26.)	24 October 1944	—	—
Erich Hohagen	Oberleutnant	Staffelkapitän of the 4./Jagdgeschwader 51 (Note: According to Scherzer on 6 October 1941 as leader of the II./Jagdgeschwader 51.)	5 October 1941	—	—
Gerhard Homuth	Oberleutnant	Staffelkapitän of the 3./Jagdgeschwader 27	14 June 1941	—	—
Dietrich Hrabak+	Hauptmann	Gruppenkommandeur of the II./Jagdgeschwader 54	21 October 1940	Awarded 337th Oak Leaves 25 November 1943	
Franz Hrdlicka	Hauptmann	Staffelkapitän of the 5./Jagdgeschwader 77 (Note: According to Scherzer on 18 October 1944 as Staffelkapitän in the II./Jagdgeschwader 77.)	9 August 1944	—	—
Ekhard Hübner	Leutnant	Pilot in the III./Jagdgeschwader 3 "Udet"	3 May 1942*	Killed in action 28 March 1942	—
Wilhelm Hübner	Leutnant	Pilot in the Stabsstaffel/Jagdgeschwader 51 "Mölders"	28 February 1945	—	—
Herbert Huppertz+	Leutnant	Pilot in the 12./Jagdgeschwader 51	30 August 1941	Awarded 512th Oak Leaves 24 June 1944	
Werner Husemann	Major	Gruppenkommandeur of the I./Nachtjagdgeschwader 3	30 September 1944	—	—
Joachim-Friedrich Huth	Oberstleutnant	Geschwaderkommodore of Zerstörergeschwader 26 "Horst Wessel"	11 September 1940	—	
Wolf-Dietrich Huy+	Oberleutnant	Staffelkapitän of the 7./Jagdgeschwader 77	5 July 1941	Awarded 83rd Oak Leaves 17 March 1942	
Max Ibel	Oberst	Geschwaderkommodore of Jagdgeschwader 27	22 August 1940	—	—
Herbert Ihlefeld+	Oberleutnant	Pilot in the I./Jagdgeschwader 77 (Note: According to Scherzer in the I.(J)/Lehrgeschwader 2)	13 September 1940	Awarded 16th Oak Leaves 27 June 1941; 9th Swords 24 April 1942	
Eduard Isken	Oberfeldwebel	Pilot in the 13./Jagdgeschwader 53	14 January 1945	—	—
Hans-Joachim Jabs+	Oberleutnant	Pilot and Staffel officer in the 2./Zerstörergeschwader 76 (Note: According to Scherzer as pilot in the 2./Zerstörergeschwader 76.)	1 October 1940	Awarded 430th Oak Leaves 24 March 1944	
Peter Jenne	Hauptmann	Staffelkapitän of the 12./Jagdgeschwader 300	2 February 1945	—	—
Josef Jennewein	Leutnant (Note: According to Scherzer as Oberfeldwebel and pilot in the I./Jagdgeschwader 51 "Mölders".)	Pilot in the 1./Jagdgeschwader 51 "Mölders"	5 December 1943*	Missing in action 26 July 1943	
Karl-Ludwig Johanssen	Leutnant	Radio operator in the I./Nachtjagdgeschwader 6 (Note: According to Scherzer as radio operator in the IV./Nachtjagdgeschwader 6.)	20 March 1945	—	—
Wilhelm Johnen	Oberleutnant	Staffelkapitän of the 8./Nachtjagdgeschwader 6 (Note: According to Scherzer as pilot in the 8./Nachtjagdgeschwader 6.)	29 October 1944	—	—
Hermann-Friedrich Joppien+	Oberleutnant	Staffelkapitän of the 1./Jagdgeschwader 51 (Note: According to Scherzer as pilot in the I./Jagdgeschwader 51.)	16 September 1940	Awarded 11th Oak Leaves 23 April 1941	
Günther Josten+	Oberfeldwebel	Pilot in the 3./Jagdgeschwader 51 "Mölders" (Note: According to Scherzer as pilot in the 1./Jagdgeschwader 51 "Mölders".)	5 February 1944	Awarded 810th Oak Leaves 28 March 1945	—
Heinrich Jung	Hauptmann	Gruppenkommandeur of the II./Jagdgeschwader 54	12 November 1943*	Killed in action 30 July 1943	—
Erbo Graf von Kageneck+	Oberleutnant	Staffelkapitän of the 9./Jagdgeschwader 27	30 July 1941	Awarded 39th Oak Leaves 26 October 1941	
Herbert Kaiser	Oberfeldwebel	Pilot in the 8./Jagdgeschwader 77 (later Jagdgeschwader 1) (Note: According to Scherzer as pilot in the 9./Jagdgeschwader 77.)	14 March 1943	—	—
Peter Kalden	Leutnant	Staffelführer of the 13./Jagdgeschwader 51 "Mölders" (Note: According to Scherzer as pilot in the 13./Jagdgeschwader 51 "Mölders".)	6 December 1944	—	—
Rolf Kaldrack+	Hauptmann	Gruppenkommandeur of the III./Zerstörergeschwader 76	2 November 1940	Awarded 70th Oak Leaves 9 February 1942	—
Herbert Kaminski	Hauptmann	Gruppenkommandeur of the I./Zerstörergeschwader 26 "Horst Wessel"	6 August 1941	—	—
Fritz Karch	Hauptmann	Gruppenkommandeur of the II./Jagdgeschwader 2 "Richthofen"	17 April 1945	—	—
Lothar Keller	Hauptmann	Gruppenkommandeur of the II./Jagdgeschwader 3	9 July 1941*	Killed in flying accident 26 June 1941	
Heinz Kemethmüller	Feldwebel	Pilot in the 8./Jagdgeschwader 3 "Udet" (Note: According to Scherzer as pilot in the III./Jagdgeschwader 3 "Udet".)	2 October 1942	—	—
Karl Kempf	Oberfeldwebel	Pilot in the 7./Jagdgeschwader 54	4 February 1942	—	—
Karl Kennel+	Hauptmann (Note: According to Scherzer as Oberleutnant.)	Staffelkapitän of the 5./Schlachtgeschwader 1	19 September 1943	Awarded 666th Oak Leaves 25 November 1944	—
Johannes Kiel	Oberleutnant of the Reserves	Pilot in the I./Zerstörergeschwader 26 "Horst Wessel"	18 March 1942	—	—
Willy Kientsch+	Leutnant	Staffelführer of the 6./Jagdgeschwader 27 (Note: According to Scherzer as pilot in the II./Jagdgeschwader 27.)	22 November 1943	Awarded 527th Oak Leaves 20 July 1944	—
Joachim Kirschner+	Leutnant	Staffelführer of the 5./Jagdgeschwader 3 "Udet"	23 December 1942	Awarded 267th Oak Leaves 2 August 1943	—
Otto Kittel+	Oberfeldwebel	Pilot in the 2./Jagdgeschwader 54 (Note: According to Scherzer as pilot in the I./Jagdgeschwader 54.)	29 October 1943	Awarded 449th Oak Leaves 11 April 1944; 113th Swords 25 November 1944	—
Alfons Klein	Oberleutnant	Staffelkapitän of the 10./Jagdgeschwader 11	27 April 1945	—	—
Rudolf Klemm	Hauptmann	Staffelkapitän of the 10./Jagdgeschwader 54 (Note: According to Scherzer as Staffelkapitän in the IV./Jagdgeschwader 54.)	18 November 1944	—	—
Heinrich Klöpper	Oberfeldwebel	Pilot in the 11./Jagdgeschwader 51 "Mölders"	4 September 1942	—	—
Reinhold Knacke+	Oberleutnant	Pilot in the 3./Nachtjagdgeschwader 1	1 July 1942	Awarded 190th Oak Leaves 7 February 1943	—
Kurt Knappe	Unteroffizier	Pilot in the 5./Jagdgeschwader 51 "Mölders"	3 November 1942	—	—
Heinz Knoke	Hauptmann	Gruppenkommandeur of the III./Jagdgeschwader 11	27 April 1945	—	—
Gerhard Koall	Hauptmann	Gruppenkommandeur of the IV./Jagdgeschwader 54	10 October 1944	—	—
Josef Kociok	Oberfeldwebel	Pilot in the 10.(NJ)/Zerstörergeschwader 1	31 July 1943	—	
Armin Köhler	Hauptmann	Gruppenkommandeur of the III./Jagdgeschwader 77	7 February 1945	—	—
Hans-Heinrich Koenig	Oberleutnant	Leader of the I./Jagdgeschwader 11 (Note: According to Scherzer as Staffelkapitän of the 3./Jagdgeschwader 11.)	19 August 1944*	Killed in flying accident 24 May 1944	—
Gerhard Köppen+	Feldwebel	Pilot in the 7./Jagdgeschwader 52 (Note: According to Scherzer as pilot in the 8./Jagdgeschwader 52.)	18 December 1941	Awarded 79th Oak Leaves 27 February 1942	—
Friedrich Körner	Leutnant	Staffelführer of the 2./Jagdgeschwader 27 (Note: According to Scherzer as pilot in the I./Jagdgeschwader 27.)	6 September 1942	—	—
Alfons Köster	Oberfeldwebel	Pilot in the 3./Nachtjagdgeschwader 2	29 October 1942	—	—
Hans Kolbow	Oberleutnant	Staffelkapitän of the 6./Jagdgeschwader 51	27 July 1941*	Killed in action 16 July 1941	—
Reinhard Kollak	Oberfeldwebel	Pilot in the 8./Nachtjagdgeschwader 4 (Note: According to Scherzer as pilot in the 7./Nachtjagdgeschwader 4.)	29 August 1943	—	—
Berthold Korts	Leutnant	Pilot in the 9./Jagdgeschwader 52	29 August 1943	—	—
Heinrich Krafft	Oberleutnant of the Reserves (Note: According to Scherzer as Oberleutnant.)	Staffelkapitän of the 3./Jagdgeschwader 51 "Mölders"	18 March 1942	—	
Josef Kraft+	Oberleutnant	Pilot in the II./Nachtjagdgeschwader 6 (Note: According to Scherzer as pilot in the 7./Nachtjagdgeschwader 6.)	30 September 1944	Awarded 838th Oak Leaves 17 April 1945	—
Karl-Heinz Krahl	Hauptmann	Leader of the I./Jagdgeschwader 2 "Richthofen"	13 November 1940	—	
Johannes Krause	Hauptmann	Gruppenkommandeur of the II./Nachtjagdgeschwader 101	7 February 1945	—	—
Hans-Joachim Kroschinski	Oberfeldwebel	Pilot in the 3./Jagdgeschwader 54	17 April 1945	—	—
Walter Krupinski+	Leutnant	Pilot in the 6./Jagdgeschwader 52	29 October 1942	Awarded 415th Oak Leaves 2 March 1944	
Walter Kubisch	Oberfeldwebel	Radio/wireless operator in Nachtjagdgeschwader 3 (Note: According to Scherzer as radio/wireless operator in the Stab/Nachtjagdgeschwader 3.)	31 December 1943	—	—
Emil Lang+	Leutnant	Staffelführer of the 9./Jagdgeschwader 54	22 November 1943	Awarded 448th Oak Leaves 11 April 1944	—
[Dr.] Heinz Lange	Hauptmann	Gruppenkommandeur of the IV./Jagdgeschwader 51 "Mölders" (Note: According to Scherzer as leader of the IV./Jagdgeschwader 51 "Mölders".)	18 November 1944	—	—
Karl-Heinz Langer	Major	Gruppenkommandeur of the III./Jagdgeschwader 3 "Udet"	20 April 1945	—	—
Erwin Laskowski	Oberfeldwebel	Pilot in the 8./Jagdgeschwader 11	27 April 1945	—	—
Kurt Lasse	Oberleutnant	Staffelkapitän of the 9./Jagdgeschwader 77	3 May 1942*	Killed in action 8 October 1941	
Fritz Lau	Hauptmann	Staffelkapitän of the 4./Nachtjagdgeschwader 1	28 April 1945	—	—
Heinz Leber	Oberfeldwebel	Pilot in the 2./Jagdgeschwader 51 "Mölders" (Note: According to Scherzer as pilot in the I./Jagdgeschwader 51 "Mölders".)	29 February 1944*	Killed in action 1 June 1943	—
Alois Lechner	Hauptmann (Note: According to Scherzer as Hauptmann of the Reserves.)	Staffelkapitän of the 1./Nachtjagdgeschwader 100	5 February 1944	—	—
Karl-Heinz Leesmann	Oberleutnant	Staffelkapitän of the 2./Jagdgeschwader 52	23 July 1941	—	
Erich Leie	Oberleutnant	Pilot in the Stab of I./Jagdgeschwader 2 "Richthofen" (Note: According to Scherzer as pilot in the Stab/Jagdgeschwader 2 "Richthofen".)	1 August 1941	—	
Siegfried Lemke	Leutnant	Staffelführer of the 1./Jagdgeschwader 2 "Richthofen" (Note: According to Scherzer on 11 June 1944 as Staffelführer in the I./Jagdgeschwader 2 "Richthofen".)	14 June 1944	—	
Wilhelm Lemke+	Leutnant	Staffelführer of the 9./Jagdgeschwader 3 "Udet" (Note: According to Scherzer as pilot in the 8./Jagdgeschwader 3 "Udet".)	12 September 1942 (Note: According to Scherzer on 19 September 1942.)	Awarded 338th Oak Leaves 25 November 1943	—
Helmut Lent+	Oberleutnant	Staffelkapitän of the 6./Nachtjagdgeschwader 1 (Note: According to Scherzer as Staffelkapitän of the 4./Nachtjagdgeschwader 1)	30 August 1941	Awarded 98th Oak Leaves 6 June 1942; 32nd Swords 2 August 1943; 15th Diamonds 31 July 1944	
Richard Leppla	Hauptmann	Gruppenkommandeur of the III./Jagdgeschwader 51	27 July 1941	—	
Hans Liebherr	Oberfeldwebel	Radio/wireless operator in the I./Nachtjagdgeschwader 4	27 July 1944	—	—
Frank Liesendahl	Hauptmann	Staffelkapitän of the 10./Jagdgeschwader 2 "Richthofen" (Note: According to Scherzer as Staffelkapitän of the 10.(Jabo)/Jagdgeschwader 2 "Richthofen".)	4 September 1942*	Missing in action 17 July 1942	—
Arnold Lignitz	Oberleutnant	Gruppenkommandeur of the III./Jagdgeschwader 54	5 November 1940	—	—
Anton Lindner	Leutnant	Pilot in the Stabsstaffel/Jagdgeschwader 51 "Mölders" (Note: According to Scherzer as pilot in the I./Jagdgeschwader 51 "Mölders".)	8 April 1944	—	—
Lothar Linke	Oberleutnant	Staffelführer of the 12./Nachtjagdgeschwader 1 (Note: According to Scherzer as Staffelkapitän of the 12./Nachtjagdgeschwader 1.)	19 September 1943*	Killed in parachute accident 14 May 1943	—
Rudi Linz	Leutnant	Pilot in the 12./Jagdgeschwader 5	12 March 1945*	Killed in action 9 February 1945 (Note: According to Scherzer on 17 February 1945.)	—
Helmut Lipfert+	Leutnant of the Reserves (Note: According to Scherzer as Leutnant (war officer).)	Staffelführer of the 6./Jagdgeschwader 52	5 April 1944	Awarded 837th Oak Leaves 17 April 1945	—
Egmont Prinz zur Lippe-Weißenfeld+	Oberleutnant	Staffelkapitän of the 5./Nachtjagdgeschwader 2	16 April 1942	Awarded 263rd Oak Leaves 2 August 1943	
Wolfgang Lippert	Hauptmann	Gruppenkommandeur of the II./Jagdgeschwader 27	24 September 1940	—	—
Stefan Litjens	Oberfeldwebel	Pilot in the 4./Jagdgeschwader 53	21 June 1943	—	—
Gerhard Loos	Leutnant	Staffelführer of the 8./Jagdgeschwader 54 (Note: According to Scherzer as pilot in the 1./Jagdgeschwader 54.)	5 February 1944	—	—
Walter Loos	Oberfeldwebel	Pilot in the Stab/Jagdgeschwader 300	20 April 1945	—	—
Fritz Losigkeit	Major	Geschwaderkommodore of Jagdgeschwader 51 "Mölders"	28 April 1945	—	—
Werner Lucas	Feldwebel	Pilot in the 4./Jagdgeschwader 3 "Udet"	19 September 1942	—	—
Max-Hermann Lücke	Oberleutnant	Pilot in the 9./Jagdgeschwader 51 "Mölders"	6 April 1944*	Died of wounds 8 November 1943	—
Fritz Lüddecke	Oberfeldwebel	Pilot in the Stabsstaffel/Jagdgeschwader 51 "Mölders"	18 November 1944*	Killed in action 10 August 1944	—
Herbert Lütje+	Hauptmann	Staffelkapitän of the 8./Nachtjagdgeschwader 1	1 June 1943	Awarded 836th Oak Leaves 17 April 1945	
Günther Lützow+	Major	Geschwaderkommodore of Jagdgeschwader 3	18 September 1940	Awarded 27th Oak Leaves 20 July 1941; 4th Swords 11 October 1941	
Johannes Lutter	Oberfeldwebel	Pilot in the II./Schnellkampfgeschwader 210	5 October 1941	—	—
Martin Lutz	Hauptmann	Staffelkapitän of the 1./Zerstörergeschwader 1 (Note: According to Scherzer as Gruppenkommandeur of the Erprobungsgruppe 210 (awarded for his merits as Staffelkapitän of the 1./Zerstörergeschwader 1).)	1 October 1940*	Killed in action 27 September 1940	—
Werner Machold	Oberfeldwebel	Pilot in the 7./Jagdgeschwader 2 "Richthofen" (Note: According to Scherzer as pilot in the I./Jagdgeschwader 2 "Richthofen".)	5 September 1940	—	
Anton Mader	Major	Gruppenkommandeur of the II./Jagdgeschwader 77	23 July 1942 (Note: According to Scherzer on 15 July 1942.)	—	—
Wilhelm Makrocki	Hauptmann	Gruppenkommandeur of the I./Zerstörergeschwader 26 "Horst Wessel"	6 October 1940	—	—
Günther Freiherr von Maltzahn+	Hauptmann	Gruppenkommandeur of the II./Jagdgeschwader 53	30 December 1940	Awarded 29th Oak Leaves 24 July 1941	
Heinz Marquardt	Fahnenjunker-Oberfeldwebel (Note: According to Scherzer as Oberfeldwebel.)	Pilot in the 13./Jagdgeschwader 51 "Mölders"	18 November 1944	—	—
Hans-Joachim Marseille+	Leutnant	Pilot in the 3./Jagdgeschwader 27	22 February 1942	Awarded 97th Oak Leaves 6 June 1942; 12th Swords 18 June 1942; 4th Diamonds 3 September 1942	The head and shoulders of a young man, shown in semi-profile. He wears a military uniform with an Iron Cross displayed at the front of his shirt collar. His hair appears blond and short and combed back, his nose is long and straight, and his facial expression is determined but smiling; looking to the left of the camera.
Karl-Heinrich Matern	Hauptmann	Gruppenkommandeur of the II./Zerstörergeschwader 1	9 October 1943*	Killed in action 8 October 1943	—
Walter Matoni	Hauptmann	Gruppenkommandeur of the II./Jagdgeschwader 2 "Richthofen" (Note: According to Scherzer as Gruppenkommandeur of the I./Jagdgeschwader 2 "Richthofen".)	16 December 1944	—	—
Egon Mayer+	Leutnant of the Reserves (Note: According to Scherzer as Leutnant and pilot in the III./Jagdgeschwader 2 "Richthofen".)	Pilot in Jagdgeschwader 2 "Richthofen"	1 August 1941	Awarded 232nd Oak Leaves 16 April 1943; 51st Swords 2 March 1944	
Hans-Karl Mayer	Hauptmann	Staffelkapitän of the 1./Jagdgeschwader 53	3 September 1940	—	—
Wilhelm Mayer	Leutnant	Staffelführer of the 5./Jagdgeschwader 26 "Schlageter"	12 March 1945*	Killed in action 4 January 1945	—
Maximilian Mayerl	Oberleutnant	Staffelkapitän of the 9./Jagdgeschwader 51 "Mölders"	22 November 1943	—	—
Helmut Meckel	Oberleutnant	Staffelkapitän in the I./Jagdgeschwader 3 (Note: According to Scherzer as Staffelkapitän of the 2./Jagdgeschwader 3.)	12 August 1941	—	
Johann-Hermann Meier	Leutnant	Staffelführer in the 1./Jagdgeschwader 26 "Schlageter" (Note: According to Scherzer as Staffelführer in the I./Jagdgeschwader 52.)	16 December 1944*	Killed in flying accident 15 March 1944	—
Julius Meimberg	Hauptmann	Gruppenkommandeur of the II./Jagdgeschwader 53	24 October 1944	—	—
Ludwig Meister	Hauptmann	Staffelkapitän of the 1./Nachtjagdgeschwader 4	9 June 1944	—	—
Helmut Mertens	Oberleutnant	Pilot in the I./Jagdgeschwader 3 "Udet"	4 September 1942	—	—
Manfred Meurer+	Oberleutnant	Staffelkapitän of the 3./Nachtjagdgeschwader 1	16 April 1943	Awarded 264th Oak Leaves 2 August 1943	—
Eduard Meyer	Leutnant	Pilot in the I./Zerstörergeschwader 26 "Horst Wessel"	20 December 1941	—	—
Georg Michalek	Oberleutnant	Staffelkapitän of the 4./Jagdgeschwader 3	4 November 1941	—	
Gerhard Michalski+	Oberleutnant	Staffelkapitän of the 4./Jagdgeschwader 53	4 September 1942	Awarded 667th Oak Leaves 25 November 1944	—
Rudolf Miethig	Leutnant	Staffelführer of the 3./Jagdgeschwader 52	29 October 1942	—	
Klaus Mietusch+	Hauptmann	Gruppenkommandeur of the III./Jagdgeschwader 26 "Schlageter"	26 March 1944	Awarded 653rd Oak Leaves 18 November 1944	Mietusch stands inside his open aircraft cockpit wearing full flight gear.
Wilhelm Mink	Oberfeldwebel	Pilot in the 5./Jagdgeschwader 51 "Mölders"	19 March 1942	—	—
Helmut Mißner	Oberfeldwebel	Pilot in the I./Jagdgeschwader 54 (Note: According to Scherzer as pilot in the 3./Jagdgeschwader 54.)	10 October 1944*	Killed in action 12 September 1944	—
Ernst-Wilhelm Modrow	Hauptmann	Staffelkapitän of the 1./Nachtjagdgeschwader 1	19 August 1944	—	—
Werner Mölders+	Hauptmann	Gruppenkommandeur of the III./Jagdgeschwader 53	29 May 1940	Awarded 2nd Oak Leaves 21 September 1940; 2nd Swords 22 June 1941; 1st Diamonds 15 July 1941 (Note: According to Scherzer 1st Diamonds on 16 July 1941.)	The head and shoulders of a young man, shown in semi-profile. He wears a field cap and a pilot's leather jacket with a fur collar, with an Iron Cross displayed at the front of his shirt collar. His hair is dark and short, his nose is long and straight, and his facial expression is a determined and confident smile; his eyes gaze into the distance.
Wilhelm Moritz	Major	Gruppenkommandeur of the IV./Jagdgeschwader 3 "Udet" (Note: According to Scherzer as Gruppenkommandeur of the IV.(Sturm)/Jagdgeschwader 3 "Udet".)	18 July 1944	—	—
August Mors	Leutnant	Pilot in the 1./Jagdgeschwader 5	20 October 1944* (Note: According to Scherzer on 24 October 1944.)	Died of wounds 8 August 1944	—
Friedrich-Karl Müller+	Oberleutnant	Staffelkapitän of the 8./Jagdgeschwader 53 (Note: According to Scherzer as Staffelkapitän of the 8./Jagdgeschwader 53 on 19 September 1941.)	14 September 1942	Awarded 126th Oak Leaves 23 September 1942	—
Friedrich-Karl Müller	Hauptmann	Staffelkapitän of the 1./Nachtjagdgruppe 10	27 July 1944	—	—
Rudolf Müller	Feldwebel	Pilot in the 6./Jagdgeschwader 5	19 June 1942	—	
Walter Müller! (Note: The addendum of Fellgiebel's book, Die Träger des Ritterkreuzes des Eisernen Kreuzes 1939–1945 (in German), contains a note indicating that Walter Müller needs to be struck from the list.)	Hauptmann	Staffelkapitän of the 3./Nachtjagdgeschwader 1	20 August 1944	—	—
Joachim Müncheberg+	Oberleutnant	Staffelkapitän of the 7./Jagdgeschwader 26 "Schlageter" (Note: According to Scherzer as adjutant in the III./Jagdgeschwader 26 "Schlageter".)	14 September 1940	Awarded 12th Oak Leaves 7 May 1941; 19th Swords 9 September 1942	
Leopold Münster+	Feldwebel	Pilot in the II./Jagdgeschwader 3 "Udet"	21 December 1942	Awarded 471st Oak Leaves 12 May 1944	
Hubert Mütherich	Oberleutnant	Staffelkapitän of the 5./Jagdgeschwader 54	6 August 1941	—	
Heinz Nacke	Hauptmann	Staffelkapitän of the 6./Zerstörergeschwader 76	2 November 1940	—	—
Johannes Naumann	Hauptmann	Gruppenkommandeur of the II./Jagdgeschwader 6	9 November 1944	—	
Willi Nemitz	Oberfeldwebel	Pilot in the 4./Jagdgeschwader 52 (Note: According to Scherzer as pilot in the 5./Jagdgeschwader 52.)	24 March 1943	—	—
Hermann Neuhoff	Leutnant	Staffelführer in the III./Jagdgeschwader 53 (Note: According to Scher on 19 June 1942 as Staffelführer of the 7./Jagdgeschwader 53.)	16 June 1942	—	—
Helmut Neumann	Leutnant	Staffelführer of the 14./Jagdgeschwader 5	12 March 1945	—	—
Klaus Neumann	Feldwebel	Pilot in the 16./Jagdgeschwader 3 "Udet" (Note: According to Scherzer on 25 November 1944 as pilot in the 16.(Sturm)/Jagdgeschwader 3 "Udet".)	9 December 1944	—	—
Erhard Nippa	Oberleutnant	Pilot in the 15./Schnellkampfgeschwader 10	26 March 1944	—	—
Karl-Gottfried Nordmann+	Oberleutnant	Staffelkapitän of the 12./Jagdgeschwader 51	1 August 1941	Awarded 35th Oak Leaves 16 September 1941	The head and shoulders of a young man, shown in semi-profile. He wears a peaked cap and a military uniform with an Eagle above his right and a military decorations above left breast pocket, and an Iron Cross displayed at the front of his shirt collar. His facial expression is a determined; his eyes are looking into the distance to the left of the camera.
Jakob Norz	Oberfeldwebel	Pilot in the 6./Jagdgeschwader 5 (Note: According to Scherzer as pilot in the III./Jagdgeschwader 5.)	26 March 1944	—	—
Walter Nowotny+	Leutnant	Pilot in the 9./Jagdgeschwader 54 (Note: According to Scherzer as pilot in the 3./Jagdgeschwader 54.)	4 September 1942	Awarded 293rd Oak Leaves 4 September 1943; 37th Swords 22 September 1943; 8th Diamonds 19 October 1943	
Carlos Nugent	Fahnenjunker-Oberfeldwebel	Radio operator in the I./Nachtjagdgeschwader 2	17 April 1945	—	—
Hans Nuhr! (Note: The addendum of Fellgiebel's book, Die Träger des Ritterkreuzes des Eisernen Kreuzes 1939–1945 (in German), contains a note indicating that Hans Nuhr needs to be struck from the list.)	Oberfeldwebel	Pilot in Schnellkampfgeschwader 210	22 March 1944	—	—
Friedrich Obleser	Leutnant	Staffelführer of the 8./Jagdgeschwader 52	23 March 1944 (Note: According to Scherzer on 26 March 1944.)	—	—
Walter Oesau+	Hauptmann	Staffelkapitän of the 7./Jagdgeschwader 51	20 August 1940	Awarded 9th Oak Leaves 6 February 1941; 3rd Swords 15 July 1941 (Note: According to Scherzer the 3rd Knight's Cross of the Iron Cross with Oak Leaves and Swords was awarded on 16 July 1941.)	
Walter Ohlrogge	Feldwebel	Pilot in the 5./Jagdgeschwader 3	4 November 1941	—	—
Robert Olejnik	Oberleutnant	Staffelkapitän of the 4./Jagdgeschwader 1 (Note: According to Scherzer on 30 July 1941 as pilot in the I./Jagdgeschwader 3.)	27 July 1941	—	
Emil Omert	Leutnant	Pilot in the III./Jagdgeschwader 77 (Note: According to Scherzer as pilot in the 8./Jagdgeschwader 77.)	19 March 1942	—	—
Theo Osterkamp	Generalmajor	Jagdfliegerführer of Luftflotte 2 (Note: According to Scherzer as Jagdfliegerführer 1 for his achievements as Geschwaderkommodore of Jagdgeschwader 51.)	22 August 1940	—	
Max-Hellmuth Ostermann+	Leutnant	Pilot in the 7./Jagdgeschwader 54	4 September 1941	Awarded 81st Oak Leaves 12 March 1942; 10th Swords 17 May 1942	
Dr. Horst Patuschka	Hauptmann	Gruppenkommandeur of the II./Nachtjagdgeschwader 2	10 May 1943*	Killed in action 6 March 1943	—
Hans Peterburs	Oberfeldwebel	Pilot in the II./Schlachtgeschwader 4 (Note: According to Scherzer as pilot in the II./Zerstörergeschwader 1.)	25 November 1942	—	—
Viktor Petermann	Leutnant	Pilot in the III./Jagdgeschwader 52 (Note: According to Scherzer as pilot in the 6./Jagdgeschwader 52.)	29 February 1944	—	—
Kurd Peters	Major	Gruppenkommandeur of the II.(Sturm)/Jagdgeschwader 300 (Note: According to Scherzer as Gruppenkommandeur of the II./Jagdgeschwader 300.)	29 October 1944	—	—
Rudolf Pflanz	Oberleutnant	Pilot in the 1./Jagdgeschwader 2 "Richthofen" (Note: According to Scherzer as pilot in the Stab/Jagdgeschwader 2 "Richthofen".)	1 August 1941	—	
Hans Philipp+	Oberleutnant	Staffelkapitän of the 4./Jagdgeschwader 54	22 October 1940	Awarded 33rd Oak Leaves 24 August 1941; 8th Swords 12 March 1942	—
Wilhelm Philipp	Oberfeldwebel	Pilot in the 3./Jagdgeschwader 54 (Note: According to Scherzer as pilot in the I./Jagdgeschwader 54.)	26 March 1944	—	—
Johann Pichler	Fahnenjunker-Oberfeldwebel (Note: According to Scherzer as Oberfeldwebel who received the Knight's Cross of the Iron Cross as pilot in the III./Jagdgeschwader 77.)	Pilot in the 7./Jagdgeschwader 77	19 August 1944	—	—
Anton-Rudolf Piffer	Oberfeldwebel (Note: According to Scherzer as Leutnant (war officer) who received the Knight's Cross of the Iron Cross as Staffelführer of the 1./Jagdgeschwader 1 "Oesau".)	Staffelführer of the 2./Jagdgeschwader 1 "Oesau"	20 October 1944*	Killed in action 17 June 1944	—
Rolf Pingel	Hauptmann	Gruppenkommandeur of the I./Jagdgeschwader 26 "Schlageter"	14 September 1940	—	
Josef Pöhs	Leutnant of the Reserves (Note: According to Scherzer as Leutnant (war officer) and pilot in the II./Jagdgeschwader 54.)	Pilot in the 5./Jagdgeschwader 54	6 August 1941	—	
Alexander Preinfalk	Unteroffizier	Pilot in the 5./Jagdgeschwader 77	14 October 1942	—	—
Josef Priller+	Oberleutnant	Staffelkapitän of the 6./Jagdgeschwader 51	19 October 1940	Awarded 28th Oak Leaves 20 July 1941; 73rd Swords 2 July 1944	
Emil Pusch! (Note: Walther-Peer Fellgiebel lists Emil Pusch as a recipient of the Knight's Cross of the Iron Cross on 9 November 1944 as Oberfeldwebel and pilot in Nachtjagdgeschwader 2. He is delisted again by Fellgiebel in the year 2000 without stating a reason.)	Oberfeldwebel	Pilot in Nachtjagdgeschwader 2	9 November 1944	—	—
Herbert Puschmann	Hauptmann	Staffelkapitän of the 6./Jagdgeschwader 51 "Mölders"	5 April 1944*	Killed in action 3 February 1944	—
Klaus Quaet-Faslem	Major	Gruppenkommandeur of I./Jagdgeschwader 3 "Udet"	9 June 1944*	Killed in flying accident 30 January 1944	—
Werner Quast	Fahnenjunker-Oberfeldwebel (Note: According to Scherzer as Oberfeldwebel and pilot in the II./Jagdgeschwader 52.)	Pilot in the 4./Jagdgeschwader 52	31 December 1943	—	—
Rudolf Rademacher	Leutnant	Pilot in the 1./Jagdgeschwader 54	30 September 1944	—	—
Waldemar Radener (Note: According to Scherzer later named Waldemar Radener-Blaschke.)	Oberleutnant	Leader of the II./Jagdgeschwader 26 "Schlageter"	12 March 1945	—	—
Günther Radusch+	Major	Gruppenkommandeur of the II./Nachtjagdgeschwader 3	29 August 1943	Awarded 444th Oak Leaves 6 April 1944	—
Gerhard Raht+	Hauptmann	Staffelkapitän of the 1./Nachtjagdgeschwader 2 (Note: According to Scherzer as Staffelkapitän of the 4./Nachtjagdgeschwader 3.)	24 June 1944	Awarded 833rd Oak Leaves 15 April 1945	—
Günther Rall+	Oberleutnant	Staffelkapitän of the 8./Jagdgeschwader 52 (Note: According to Scherzer on 4 September 1942 as pilot in the III./Jagdgeschwader 52.)	3 September 1942	Awarded 134th Oak Leaves 26 October 1942; 34th Swords 12 September 1943	The head of a young man, shown in semi-profile. He wears a military uniform with a military decoration in shape of an iron cross displayed at the front of his shirt collar. His hair is dark and short and combed to back, his nose is long and straight, he is smiling broadly and looking to the left of the camera.
Karl Rammelt	Major	Gruppenkommandeur of the II./Jagdgeschwader 51 "Mölders"	20 October 1944 (Note: According to Scherzer on 24 October 1944.)	—	—
Alfred Rauch	Fahnenjunker-Oberfeldwebel	Pilot in the Stabsstaffel/Jagdgeschwader 51 "Mölders"	28 April 1945	—	—
Paul-Hubert Rauh	Hauptmann (Note: According to Scherzer as Major.)	Gruppenkommandeur of the II./Nachtjagdgeschwader 4	28 April 1945	—	—
Karl-Wolfgang Redlich	Oberleutnant	Staffelkapitän of the 1./Jagdgeschwader 27	9 July 1941	—	—
Ernst-Wilhelm Reinert+	Unteroffizier	Pilot in the 4./Jagdgeschwader 77	1 July 1942	Awarded 131st Oak Leaves 7 October 1942; 130th Swords 1 February 1945 (Note: According to Scherzer the Oak Leaves to the Knight's Cross were awarded on 5 October 1942.)	
Hans Remmer	Hauptmann	Staffelkapitän of the 1./Jagdgeschwader 27	9 June 1944*	Killed in action 2 April 1944	—
Anton Resch	Oberleutnant	Staffelkapitän of the 3./Jagdgeschwader 52	7 April 1945	—	—
Rudolf Resch	Hauptmann	Staffelkapitän of the 5./Jagdgeschwader 52 (Note: According to Scherzer as Staffelkapitän of the 6./Jagdgeschwader 52.)	6 September 1942	—	—
Willi Reschke	Oberfeldwebel	Pilot in the Stab/Jagdgeschwader 301	20 April 1945	—	—
Ralph von Rettberg	Hauptmann	Gruppenkommandeur of the II./Zerstörergeschwader 26 "Horst Wessel"	14 June 1941	—	
Johannes Richter	Oberfeldwebel	Radio/wireless operator in the Stab Nachtjagdgruppe 10	30 September 1944	—	—
Gustav Rödel+	Oberleutnant	Staffelkapitän of the 4./Jagdgeschwader 27	22 June 1941 (Note: According to Scherzer on 24 June 1941.)	Awarded 255th Oak Leaves 20 June 1943	—
Hans Roehrig	Leutnant	Staffelkapitän of the 9./Jagdgeschwader 53 (Note: According to Scherzer as pilot in the III./Jagdgeschwader 53.)	2 October 1942	—	—
Heinz Rökker+	Oberleutnant	Staffelkapitän of the 2./Nachtjagdgeschwader 2	27 July 1944	Awarded 781st Oak Leaves 12 March 1945	—
Detlev Rohwer	Leutnant	Pilot in the I./Jagdgeschwader 3 (Note: According to Scherzer as pilot in the Stab I./Jagdgeschwader 3.)	5 October 1941	—	—
Herbert Rollwage+	Oberfeldwebel	Pilot in the 3./Jagdgeschwader 53 (Note: According to Scherzer on 5 April 1944 as pilot in the 5./Jagdgeschwader 53.)	6 April 1944	Awarded 713th Oak Leaves 24 January 1945	—
Oskar Romm	Oberfeldwebel	Pilot in the 1./Jagdgeschwader 51 "Mölders" (Note: According to Scherzer as pilot in the I./Jagdgeschwader 51 "Mölders".)	29 February 1944	—	
Theodor Rossiwall	Hauptmann	Staffelkapitän of the 5./Zerstörergeschwader 26 "Horst Wessel"	6 August 1941	—	
Edmund Roßmann	Feldwebel	Pilot in the 7./Jagdgeschwader 52	19 March 1942	—	—
Erich Rudorffer+	Leutnant	Pilot in the 6./Jagdgeschwader 2 "Richthofen"	1 May 1941	Awarded 447th Oak Leaves 11 April 1944; 126th Swords 26 January 1945	A man wearing a military uniform with a peaked cap on his head.
[Dr.] Günther Rübell	Leutnant	Pilot in the 5./Jagdgeschwader 51 "Mölders" (Note: According to Scherzer as pilot in the II./Jagdgeschwader 51 "Mölders".)	14 March 1943	—	—
Helmut Rüffler	Oberfeldwebel	Pilot in the 4./Jagdgeschwader 3 "Udet" (Note: According to Scherzer as pilot in the I./Jagdgeschwader 3 "Udet".)	23 December 1942	—	—
Franz Ruhl	Leutnant	Staffelführer of the 4./Jagdgeschwader 3 "Udet"	27 July 1944	—	—
Friedrich Rumpelhardt	Leutnant	Radio/wireless operator in the IV./Nachtjagdgeschwader 1	27 July 1944 (Note: According to Scherzer on 8 August 1944.)	—	—
Friedrich Rupp	Leutnant	Pilot in the 7./Jagdgeschwader 54	24 January 1943	—	—
Heinz Sachsenberg	Fahnenjunker-Feldwebel	Pilot in the 6./Jagdgeschwader 52	9 September 1944	—	—
Carl Sattig	Hauptmann	Staffelkapitän of the 6./Jagdgeschwader 54	19 September 1942	—	—
Heinrich Prinz zu Sayn-Wittgenstein+	Hauptmann	Staffelkapitän of the 9./Nachtjagdgeschwader 2	2 October 1942 (Note: According to Scherzer the Knight's Cross was awarded on 7 October 1942.)	Awarded 290th Oak Leaves 31 August 1943; 44th Swords 23 January 1944	
Günther Schack+	Leutnant	Pilot in the 9./Jagdgeschwader 51 "Mölders"	29 October 1943	Awarded 460th Oak Leaves 20 April 1944	—
Johann Schalk	Oberstleutnant	Gruppenkommandeur of the III./Zerstörergeschwader 26 "Horst Wessel"	5 September 1940	—	
Franz Schall	Leutnant	Staffelführer in the I./Jagdgeschwader 52 (Note: According to Scherzer as Staffelführer of the 3./Jagdgeschwader 52.)	10 October 1944	—	—
Günther Scheel	Leutnant	Staffelführer of the 3./Jagdgeschwader 54 (Note: According to Scherzer as pilot in the 3./Jagdgeschwader 54.)	5 December 1943	—	—
Rudolf Scheffel	Leutnant	Staffelführer of the 1./Zerstörergeschwader 1	29 October 1942	—	—
Gerhard Scheibe	Oberfeldwebel	Bordfunker (radio/wireless operator) in the I./Nachtjagdgeschwader 1	10 December 1943	—	—
Wolfgang Schellmann	Major	Geschwaderkommodore of Jagdgeschwader 2 "Richthofen"	18 September 1940	—	
Wolfgang Schenck+	Oberleutnant	Staffelkapitän of the 1./Schnellkampfgeschwader 210	14 August 1941	Awarded 139th Oak Leaves 30 October 1942	The head of a young man, shown in semi-profile. He wears a military uniform with an eagle above his right breast pocket, an iron cross is displayed at the front of his shirt collar. His hair is dark, short and combed to the back, his nose is long and straight, and his facial expression is determined; looking to the right of the camera.
Georg Schentke	Oberfeldwebel	Pilot in the 9./Jagdgeschwader 3	4 September 1941	—	—
Karl-Heinz Scherfling	Oberfeldwebel	Pilot in the 12./Nachtjagdgeschwader 1	8 April 1944	—	—
Hans-Georg Schierholz	Oberfeldwebel	Bordfunker (radio/wireless operator) in the I./Nachtjagdgeschwader 3	29 October 1944	—	—
Franz Schieß	Oberleutnant	Staffelkapitän of the 8./Jagdgeschwader 53	21 June 1943	—	—
Wilhelm Schilling	Oberfeldwebel	Pilot in the 9./Jagdgeschwader 54 (Note: According to Scherzer on 3 November 1942 as pilot in the III./Jagdgeschwader 54.)	10 October 1942	—	
Hans Schleef	Feldwebel	Pilot in the 7./Jagdgeschwader 3 "Udet"	9 May 1942	—	—
Hermann Schleinhege	Leutnant (Note: According to Scherzer as Leutnant of the Reserves.)	Pilot in the 8./Jagdgeschwader 54	28 January 1945	—	—
Joachim Schlichting	Hauptmann	Gruppenkommandeur of the III./Jagdgeschwader 27	14 December 1940	—	
Johann Schmid	Hauptmann	Staffelkapitän of the 8./Jagdgeschwader 26 "Schlageter" (Note: According to Scherzer as pilot in the Stab/Jagdgeschwader 26 "Schlageter".)	21 August 1941	—	—
[Dr.] Dietrich Schmidt	Oberleutnant	Staffelkapitän of the 8./Nachtjagdgeschwader 1	27 July 1944	—	—
Erich Schmidt	Leutnant	Pilot in the III./Jagdgeschwader 53 (Note: According to Scherzer as pilot in the 9./Jagdgeschwader 53.)	23 July 1941	—	—
Heinz Schmidt+	Leutnant	Pilot in the 6./Jagdgeschwader 52	23 August 1942	Awarded 124th Oak Leaves 16 September 1942 (Note: According to Scherzer on 15 September 1942.)	—
Rudolf Schmidt	Feldwebel	Pilot in the 5./Jagdgeschwader 77	30 August 1941	—	—
Winfried Schmidt	Oberleutnant (Note: According to Scherzer as Oberleutnant of the Reserves.)	Staffelkapitän of the 8./Jagdgeschwader 3	18 September 1941	—	—
Heinz-Wolfgang Schnaufer+	Oberleutnant	Staffelführer of the 12./Nachtjagdgeschwader 1	31 December 1943	Awarded 507th Oak Leaves 24 June 1944; 84th Swords 30 July 1944; 21st Diamonds 16 October 1944 (Note: According to Scherzer 84th Swords on 3 August 1944.)	
Karl-Heinz Schnell	Oberleutnant	Staffelkapitän of the 9./Jagdgeschwader 51 (Note: According to Scherzer as Staffelkapitän of the 8./Jagdgeschwader 51.)	1 August 1941	—	—
Siegfried Schnell+	Leutnant (Note: According to Scherzer as Leutnant of the Reserves and pilot in the 4./Jagdgeschwader 2 "Richthofen".)	Pilot in the II./Jagdgeschwader 2 "Richthofen"	9 November 1940	Awarded 18th Oak Leaves 9 July 1941	
Karl Schnörrer	Leutnant of the Reserves	Staffelführer of the 11./Jagdgeschwader 7	22 March 1945	—	—
Herbert Schob	Oberleutnant	Pilot in the II./Zerstörergeschwader 76 (Note: According to Scherzer as pilot in the I./Zerstörergeschwader 76.)	9 June 1944	—	—
Rudolf Schoenert+	Oberleutnant of the Reserves	Staffelkapitän of the 4./Nachtjagdgeschwader 2	25 July 1942	Awarded 450th Oak Leaves 11 April 1944	—
Helmut Schönfelder	Oberfeldwebel	Pilot in the Stabstaffel/Jagdgeschwader 51 "Mölders"	31 March 1945	—	—
Gerhard Schöpfel	Hauptmann	Gruppenkommandeur of the III./Jagdgeschwader 26 "Schlageter"	11 September 1940	—	
Herbert Schramm+	Leutnant	Pilot in the III./Jagdgeschwader 53	6 August 1941	Awarded 736th Oak Leaves 11 February 1945	—
Werner Schröer+	Leutnant	Staffelführer of the 8./Jagdgeschwader 27	20 October 1942	Awarded 268th Oak Leaves 2 August 1943 (144th) Swords 19 April 1945 (Note: According to Scherzer Swords on 16 April 1945.)	
Fritz Schröter	Oberleutnant	Staffelkapitän of the 10./Jagdgeschwader 2 "Richthofen" (Note: According to Scherzer as Staffelkapitän of the 10.(Jabo)/Jagdgeschwader 2 "Richthofen".)	24 September 1942	—	A man wearing a military uniform with an Iron Cross displayed at the front of his uniform collar.
Walter Schuck+	Oberfeldwebel	Pilot in the 7./Jagdgeschwader 5	8 April 1944	Awarded 616th Oak Leaves 30 September 1944	—
Leo Schuhmacher	Leutnant	Pilot in the II./Jagdgeschwader 1	1 March 1945	—	—
Franz Schulte	Feldwebel	Pilot in the 6./Jagdgeschwader 77	24 September 1942	—	—
Helmuth Schulte	Hauptmann	Gruppenkommandeur of the II./Nachtjagdgeschwader 6	17 April 1945	—	—
Otto Schultz	Oberfeldwebel	Pilot in the 4./Jagdgeschwader 51 "Mölders"	14 March 1943	—	—
Otto Schulz	Oberfeldwebel	Pilot in the II./Jagdgeschwader 27	22 February 1942	—	—
Fritz Schulze-Dickow	Oberleutnant	Staffelkapitän of the 8./Zerstörergeschwader 26 "Horst Wessel"	7 March 1942	—	—
Carl-Alfred Schumacher (Note: According to Scherzer name is Carl-August Schumacher.)	Oberstleutnant	Geschwaderkommodore of Jagdgeschwader 1	21 July 1940	—	—
Heinz Schumann	Hauptmann	Staffelkapitän of the 10./Jagdgeschwader 2 "Richthofen"	18 March 1943	—	—
Franz Schwaiger	Unteroffizier	Pilot in the 6./Jagdgeschwader 3 "Udet" (Note: According to Scherzer as pilot in the I./Jagdgeschwader 3 "Udet".)	29 October 1942	—	—
Günther Seeger	Leutnant	Pilot in the 7./Jagdgeschwader 53	26 March 1944	—	—
Georg Seelmann	Leutnant (Note: According to Scherzer as Leutnant of the Reserves.)	Staffelkapitän of the 11./Jagdgeschwader 51	6 October 1941	—	—
Johannes Seifert	Hauptmann	Gruppenkommandeur of the I./Jagdgeschwader 26 "Schlageter"	7 June 1942	—	—
Reinhard Seiler+	Hauptmann	Gruppenkommandeur of the III./Jagdgeschwader 54	20 December 1941	Awarded 419th Oak Leaves 2 March 1944	
Waldemar Semelka	Leutnant	Pilot in the 4./Jagdgeschwader 52	4 September 1942*	Killed in action 21 August 1942	—
Paul Semrau+	Hauptmann	Staffelkapitän of the 3./Nachtjagdgeschwader 2	7 October 1942	Awarded 841st Oak Leaves 17 April 1945	A man wearing a military uniform with an Iron Cross displayed at the front of his uniform collar.
Heinrich Setz+	Oberleutnant	Staffelkapitän of the 4./Jagdgeschwader 77	31 December 1941	Awarded 102nd Oak Leaves 23 June 1942	
Peter Siegler	Feldwebel	Pilot in the 3./Jagdgeschwader 54	3 November 1942*	Killed in action 24 September 1942	—
Rudolf Sigmund	Hauptmann	Staffelkapitän of the 11./Nachtjagdgeschwader 1 (Note: According to Scherzer as Staffelkapitän of the 10./Nachtjagdgeschwader 1.)	2 August 1943	—	—
Siegfried Simsch	Oberleutnant	Staffelkapitän of the 5./Jagdgeschwader 52	1 July 1942	—	—
Kurt Sochatzy	Oberleutnant	Staffelkapitän of the 7./Jagdgeschwader 3	12 August 1941	—	
Gerhard Sommer	Hauptmann	Staffelkapitän of the 4./Jagdgeschwader 11	27 July 1944*	Killed in action 12 May 1944	—
Wolfgang Späte+	Oberleutnant (Note: According to Scherzer as Oberleutnant of the Reserves.)	Pilot in the 5./Jagdgeschwader 54	5 October 1941	Awarded 90th Oak Leaves 23 April 1942	—
Günther Specht	Major	Gruppenkommandeur of the II./Jagdgeschwader 11	8 April 1944	—	
Wilhelm Spies+	Hauptmann	Staffelkapitän of the 1./Zerstörergeschwader 26 "Horst Wessel"	14 June 1941	Awarded 85th Oak Leaves 5 April 1942	—
Gustav Sprick	Leutnant	Pilot in the 8./Jagdgeschwader 26 "Schlageter" (Note: According to Scherzer as pilot in the III./Jagdgeschwader 26 "Schlageter".)	1 October 1940	—	
Hans-Arnold Stahlschmidt+	Leutnant	Staffelführer of the 2./Jagdgeschwader 27	20 August 1942	Awarded 365th Oak Leaves 3 January 1944	—
Hermann Staiger	Oberleutnant	Staffelkapitän of the 7./Jagdgeschwader 51	16 July 1941	—	
Hans Stechmann	Oberfeldwebel	Pilot in the 9./Jagdgeschwader 3	4 September 1941	—	
Karl Steffen	Feldwebel	Pilot in the 9./Jagdgeschwader 52 (Note: According to Scherzer as pilot in the 8./Jagdgeschwader 52.)	1 July 1942	—	—
Leopold Steinbatz+	Feldwebel	Pilot in the 9./Jagdgeschwader 52	14 February 1942	Awarded 96th Oak Leaves 2 June 1942; 14th Swords 23 June 1942	
Günter Steinhausen	Feldwebel	Pilot in the 1./Jagdgeschwader 27	3 November 1942	Missing in action 6 September 1942	—
Johannes Steinhoff+	Oberleutnant	Staffelkapitän of the 4./Jagdgeschwader 52	30 August 1941	Awarded 115th Oak Leaves 2 September 1942; 82nd Swords 28 July 1944	The head and shoulders of a man, shown in semi-profile. He wears a peaked cap and a military uniform with military decorations. His face is scared and his eyes are hidden behind glasses.
Wilhelm Steinmann	Major of the Reserves	Gruppenkommandeur of the I./Jagdgeschwader 4	28 March 1945	—	—
Heinrich Sterr	Oberfeldwebel	Pilot in the 6./Jagdgeschwader 54	5 December 1943	—	—
Bruno Stolle	Hauptmann	Staffelkapitän of the 8./Jagdgeschwader 2 "Richthofen"	17 March 1943	—	—
Max Stotz+	Oberfeldwebel	Pilot in the 5./Jagdgeschwader 54	19 June 1942	Awarded 137th Oak Leaves 30 October 1942	
Friedrich-Wilhelm Strakeljahn	Hauptmann	Staffelkapitän of the 14.(Jabo)/Jagdgeschwader 5	19 August 1943	—	—
Hubert Straßl	Oberfeldwebel	Pilot in the 8./Jagdgeschwader 51 "Mölders"	12 November 1943*	Killed in action 8 July 1943	—
Werner Streib+	Oberleutnant	Staffelkapitän of the 2./Nachtjagdgeschwader 1	6 October 1940	Awarded 197th Oak Leaves 26 February 1943; 54th Swords 11 March 1944	
Hans Strelow+	Leutnant	Staffelführer of the 5./Jagdgeschwader 51 "Mölders"	18 March 1942	Awarded 84th Oak Leaves 24 March 1942	
Heinz Strüning+	Leutnant of the Reserves (Note: According to Scherzer as Leutnant (war officer) and pilot in the 8./Nachtjagdgeschwader 2.)	Pilot in the 3./Nachtjagdgeschwader 1	29 October 1942	Awarded 528th Oak Leaves 20 July 1944	A pilot seated in his fighter craft gestures with a gloved hand.
Werner Stumpf	Oberfeldwebel	Pilot in the III./Jagdgeschwader 53 (Note: According to Scherzer as pilot in the 9./Jagdgeschwader 53.)	13 August 1942	—	—
Heinrich Sturm	Leutnant	Staffelführer of the 4./Jagdgeschwader 52	26 March 1944	—	—
Ernst Süß	Oberfeldwebel	Pilot in the 9./Jagdgeschwader 52 (Note: According to Scherzer as pilot in the III./Jagdgeschwader 52.)	4 September 1942	—	—
Paul Szameitat	Hauptmann	Gruppenkommandeur of the I./Nachtjagdgeschwader 3 (Note: According to Scherzer as Staffelführer of the 5./Nachtjagdgeschwader 3.)	6 April 1944*	Killed in flying accident 2 January 1944	—
Otto Tange	Oberfeldwebel	Pilot in the 4./Jagdgeschwader 51 "Mölders"	19 March 1942	—	—
Kurt Tanzer	Oberfeldwebel	Pilot in the 12./Jagdgeschwader 51 "Mölders"	5 December 1943	—	—
Fritz Tegtmeier	Oberfeldwebel	Pilot in the 2./Jagdgeschwader 54 (Note: According to Scherzer on 26 March 1944 as pilot in the 1./Jagdgeschwader 54.)	28 March 1944	—	—
Alfred Teumer	Oberleutnant	Staffelkapitän of the 7./Jagdgeschwader 54 (Note: According to Scherzer as Staffelkapitän in the III./Jagdgeschwader 54.)	19 August 1944	—	—
Edwin Thiel	Oberleutnant	Staffelführer of the 2./Jagdgeschwader 51 "Mölders" (Note: According to Scherzer as Staffelkapitän of the 2./Jagdgeschwader 51 "Mölders".)	16 April 1943	—	—
Werner Thierfelder	Oberleutnant (Note: According to Scherzer as Oberleutnant of the Reserves and pilot in the I./Zerstörergeschwader 26 "Horst Wessel".)	Staffelkapitän in the II./Zerstörergeschwader 26 "Horst Wessel"	10 December 1941	—	—
Gerhard Thyben+	Oberleutnant (Note: According to Scherzer as Leutnant and pilot in the 7./Jagdgeschwader 54.)	Staffelkapitän of the 7./Jagdgeschwader 54	6 December 1944	Awarded 822nd Oak Leaves 8 April 1945	
Ekkehard Tichy	Oberleutnant	Staffelkapitän of the 9.(Sturm)/Jagdgeschwader 3 "Udet" (Note: According to Scherzer as pilot in the IV./Jagdgeschwader 3 "Udet".)	14 January 1945*	Killed in action 16 August 1944	—
Horst Tietzen	Hauptmann	Staffelkapitän of the 5./Jagdgeschwader 51	20 August 1940*	Killed in action 18 August 1940	—
Günther Tonne+	Oberleutnant	Pilot in the I./Schnellkampfgeschwader 210 (Note: According to Scherzer as pilot in the 6./Schnellkampfgeschwader 210.)	5 October 1941	Awarded 632nd Oak Leaves 24 October 1944	—
Wolfgang Tonne+	Oberleutnant	Staffelkapitän of the 3./Jagdgeschwader 53	6 September 1942	Awarded 128th Oak Leaves 24 September 1942	
Eduard Tratt+	Oberleutnant	Pilot in the I./Zerstörergeschwader 1 (Note: According to Scherzer as pilot in the II./Zerstörergeschwader 1.)	12 April 1942	Awarded 437th Oak Leaves 26 March 1944	—
Hannes Trautloft	Major	Geschwaderkommodore of Jagdgeschwader 54	27 July 1941	—	—
Rudolf Trenkel	Oberfeldwebel	Pilot in the 2./Jagdgeschwader 52	19 August 1943	—	—
Kurt Ubben+	Oberleutnant	Staffelkapitän of the 8./Jagdgeschwader 77	4 September 1941	Awarded 80th Oak Leaves 12 March 1942	
Willy Unger	Fahnenjunker-Feldwebel	Pilot in the IV.(Sturm)/Jagdgeschwader 3 "Udet" (Note: According to Scherzer in the 15.(Sturm)/Jagdgeschwader 3 "Udet".)	23 October 1944	—	
Bernhard Vechtel	Fahnenjunker-Oberfeldwebel	Pilot in the 10./Jagdgeschwader 51 "Mölders"	27 July 1944	—	—
Helmut Viedebantt	Oberleutnant	Staffelkapitän in the II./Zerstörergeschwader 1	30 December 1942	—	
Heinz Vinke+	Feldwebel	Pilot in the 11./Nachtjagdgeschwader 1	19 September 1943	Awarded 465th Oak Leaves 25 April 1944	Smiling man wearing life jacket and a military decoration in shape of an Iron Cross at his neck.
Heinz-Gerhard Vogt	Leutnant	Staffelführer of the 5./Jagdgeschwader 26 "Schlageter"	25 November 1944	—	—
Friedrich Vollbracht	Oberstleutnant	Geschwaderkommodore of Zerstörergeschwader 2	13 October 1940	—	—
Friedrich Wachowiak	Unteroffizier	Pilot in the III./Jagdgeschwader 52 (Note: According to Scherzer as pilot in the 8./Jagdgeschwader 52.)	5 April 1942	—	—
Edmund Wagner	Oberfeldwebel	Pilot in the 9./Jagdgeschwader 51	17 November 1941*	Killed in action 13 November 1941	—
Rudolf Wagner	Leutnant	Pilot in the 12./Jagdgeschwader 51 "Mölders" (Note: According to Scherzer as pilot in the 10./Jagdgeschwader 51 "Mölders".)	26 March 1944	Missing in action 11 December 1943	—
Hans Waldmann	Feldwebel	Pilot in the 6./Jagdgeschwader 52	5 February 1944	—	—
Joachim Wandel	Hauptmann	Staffelkapitän of the 5./Jagdgeschwader 54	21 August 1942 (Note: According to Scherzer on 23 August 1942.)	—	—
Karl-Heinz Weber+	Oberleutnant	Staffelführer of the 7./Jagdgeschwader 51 "Mölders"	12 November 1943	Awarded 529th Oak Leaves 20 July 1944	—
Alfred Wehmeyer	Oberleutnant	Staffelkapitän of the 7./Zerstörergeschwader 26 "Horst Wessel"	4 September 1942*	Killed in action 1 June 1942	
Hans Weik	Leutnant	Staffelführer of the 10./Jagdgeschwader 3 "Udet"	27 July 1944	—	—
Ernst Weismann	Leutnant	Pilot in the 12./Jagdgeschwader 51 "Mölders"	21 August 1942	—	—
Robert Weiß+	Oberleutnant	Staffelkapitän of the 3./Jagdgeschwader 54 (Note: According to Scherzer as Staffelkapitän in the IV./Jagdgeschwader 54.)	26 March 1944	Awarded 782nd Oak Leaves 12 March 1945	
Theodor Weissenberger+	Leutnant	Pilot in the 6./Jagdgeschwader 5	13 November 1942	Awarded 266th Oak Leaves 2 August 1943	Black-and-white portrait of a man wearing a peaked cap and military flight suit with an Iron Cross displayed at his neck.
Erich Weißflog	Oberleutnant	Information officer and wireless operator of Nachtjagdgeschwader 1 (Note: According to Scherzer as information officer in the Stab/Nachtjagdgeschwader 1.)	24 June 1944	—	—
Kurt Welter+	Leutnant	Pilot in the 2./Nachtjagdgeschwader 11 (Note: According to Scherzer as pilot in the 10./Jagdgeschwader 300.)	18 October 1944	Awarded 769th Oak Leaves 11 March 1945	—
Dr. chem. Peter Werfft	Hauptmann (Note: According to Scherzer as Oberleutnant of the Reserves)	Gruppenkommandeur of the III./Jagdgeschwader 27	28 January 1945	—	—
Heinz Wernicke	Leutnant	Pilot in the 1./Jagdgeschwader 54 (Note: According to Scherzer as pilot in the II./Jagdgeschwader 54.)	30 September 1944	—	—
Ulrich Wernitz	Feldwebel	Pilot in the 4./Jagdgeschwader 54 (Note: According to Scherzer as pilot in the I./Jagdgeschwader 54.)	29 October 1944	—	—
Franz von Werra	Oberleutnant	Adjutant of the II./Jagdgeschwader 3	14 December 1940	—	
Otto Weßling+	Oberfeldwebel	Pilot in the 9./Jagdgeschwader 3 "Udet" (Note: According to Scherzer on 4 September 1942 as pilot in the 1./Jagdgeschwader 3 "Udet".)	3 September 1942	Awarded 530th Oak Leaves 20 July 1944	—
Walther Wever	Leutnant	Pilot in the 3./Jagdgeschwader 51 "Mölders"	28 January 1945	—	—
Helmut Wick+	Oberleutnant	Staffelkapitän of the 3./Jagdgeschwader 2 "Richthofen"	27 August 1940	Awarded 4th Oak Leaves 6 October 1940 (Note: According to Scherzer on 25 October 1940.)	The head and shoulders of a young man. He wears a military uniform, an Iron Cross displayed at the front of his shirt collar and breast pocket.
Johannes Wiese+	Hauptmann	Staffelkapitän of the 2./Jagdgeschwader 52	5 January 1943	Awarded 418th Oak Leaves 2 March 1944	—
Wolf-Dietrich Wilcke+	Hauptmann	Gruppenkommandeur of the III./Jagdgeschwader 53	6 August 1941	Awarded 122nd Oak Leaves 9 September 1942; 23rd Swords 23 December 1942	
Heinrich Wilke	Feldwebel	Radio/wireless operator in the II./Nachtjagdgeschwader 100 (Note: According to Scherzer as radio/wireless operator in the III./Nachtjagdgeschwader 5 on 25 November 1944.)	6 December 1944	—	—
Karl Willius	Leutnant	Staffelführer of the 2./Jagdgeschwader 26 "Schlageter"	9 June 1944*	Killed in action 8 April 1944	—
Alexander von Winterfeldt	Major of the Reserves	Gruppenkommandeur of the III./Jagdgeschwader 77	5 July 1941	—	—
Hermann Wischnewski	Fahnenjunker-Oberfeldwebel	Pilot in the 2./Jagdgeschwader 300	16 December 1944	—	—
Ulrich Wöhnert	Leutnant	Pilot in the 5./Jagdgeschwader 54	6 December 1944	—	—
Heinrich Wohlers	Hauptmann	Gruppenkommandeur of the I./Nachtjagdgeschwader 6	31 December 1943	—	—
Franz Woidich	Leutnant of the Reserves (Note: According to Scherzer as Leutnant.)	Pilot in the 3./Jagdgeschwader 52	11 June 1944	—	—
Bernhard Woldenga	Major	Geschwaderkommodore of Jagdgeschwader 77	5 July 1941	—	
Albin Wolf+	Oberfeldwebel	Pilot in the 6./Jagdgeschwader 54 (Note: According to Scherzer as pilot in the II./Jagdgeschwader 54 and posthumously the 464th Oak Leaves on 25 April 1944.)	22 November 1943	Awarded 464th Oak Leaves 27 April 1944	—
Hermann Wolf	Leutnant	Pilot in the 9./Jagdgeschwader 11	24 April 1945	—	—
Walter Wolfrum	Leutnant	Pilot in the 5./Jagdgeschwader 52 (Note: According to Scherzer as pilot in the I./Jagdgeschwader 52.)	27 July 1944	—	—
Otto Würfel	Oberfeldwebel	Pilot in the 9./Jagdgeschwader 51 "Mölders" (Note: According to Scherzer as pilot in the 8./Jagdgeschwader 51 "Mölders".)	4 May 1944	—	—
Josef Wurmheller+	Oberfeldwebel	Pilot in the 9./Jagdgeschwader 2 "Richthofen" (Note: According to Scherzer as pilot in the 5./Jagdgeschwader 2 "Richthofen" and 146th Oak Leaves on 14 November 1942.)	4 September 1941	Awarded 146th Oak Leaves 13 November 1942; 108th Swords 24 October 1944	
Walter Zellot	Leutnant	Pilot in the I./Jagdgeschwader 53	3 September 1942	—	—
Oskar Zimmermann	Leutnant	Pilot in the 9./Jagdgeschwader 3 "Udet" (Note: According to Scherzer on 24 October 1944 as Staffelführer in the III./Jagdgeschwader 3 "Udet".)	29 October 1944	—	—
Paul Zorner+	Hauptmann	Staffelkapitän of the 8./Nachtjagdgeschwader 3	9 June 1944	Awarded 588th Oak Leaves 17 September 1944	—
Eugen-Ludwig Zweigart	Oberfeldwebel	Pilot in the 5./Jagdgeschwader 54	22 January 1943	—	—
Josef Zwernemann+	Oberfeldwebel	Pilot in 7./Jagdgeschwader 52	23 June 1942	Awarded 141st Oak Leaves 31 October 1942	
Rudi Zwesken	Oberfeldwebel	Pilot in the 6./Jagdgeschwader 300	21 March 1945	—	—
