= Diesing =

Diesing is a surname. Notable people with it include:

- Freda Diesing (1925–2002), Canadian sculptor
- Karl Moriz Diesing (1800–1867), Austrian naturalist and zoologist
- Ulrich Diesing (1911–1945), German pilot
