= Arved Crüger =

- Arved Crüger
- Born: 25 June 1911; Pillau, East Prussia
- Died: 22 March 1942 (aged 30); MIA in Malta
- Spouse: Carola Höhn
- Military career
- Allegiance: Weimar Republic (to 1933); Nazi Germany
- Branch: Luftwaffe
- Service years: 1931–42
- Rank: Major
- Commands: 5./KG 30; SKG 210; KG 77
- Conflicts: World War II
- Awards: Knight's Cross of the Iron Cross

Arved Crüger (25 June 1911 – 22 March 1942) was a Luftwaffe wing commander during World War II and Knight's Cross of the Iron Cross recipient. He married the German movie actress Carola Höhn in 1941. He was appointed Geschwaderkommodore (Wing Commander) of Kampfgeschwader 77 (KG 77—77th Bomber Wing) in 1942. Crüger was posted as missing in action on 22 March 1942.

== Early life and career ==
Gustav-Arved Crüger was born on 25 June 1911 in Pillau, district of Samland in East Prussia. He joined the military service as a Fahnenjunker (Officer Cadet) in the 2nd Infantry Regiment (Infanterie-Regiment 2) on 1 April 1931. He then attended the Military School Dresden from 1 October 1932 until 1 June 1933. Among his classmates were Werner Mölders, Günther Freiherr von Maltzahn, Joachim Pötter, Hans-Henning Freiherr von Beust, Hubertus von Bonin, Gerhard Kollewe and Wolfgang Schellmann. With graduation he was promoted to Fähnrich and transferred to the 6th Communications-Department (Nachrichtenabteilung 6). He then attended the Artillery School in Jüterbog before transferring to the Luftwaffe in 1934. In April 1939, he was transferred to the 10. Staffel (10th squadron) of Lehrgeschwader 1 (LG 1—1st Demonstration Wing) flying the Heinkel He 111 bomber.

== World War II ==
World War II in Europe began on Friday 1 September 1939 when German forces invaded Poland. On 3 September, he flew his only combat mission with LG 1. A week later, he was appointed Staffelkapitän (squadron leader) of 3. Staffel of Kampfgeschwader 30 (KG 30—30th Bomber Wing). On 9 April 1940, during Operation Weserübung, Crüger claimed a hit on either HMS Southampton or HMS Galatea while in fact HMS Gurkha was sunk. Hauptmann Crüger received the Knight's Cross of the Iron Cross (Ritterkreuz des Eisernen Kreuzes) on 19 June 1940 in recognition of his leadership as Staffelkapitän of the 3. Staffel of KG 30 during the anti-shipping campaign against the British Home Fleet and during the Battle of France.

In November 1940, Crüger was appointed Gruppenkommandeur (group commander) of III. Gruppe (3rd group) of KG 30. On 29 March 1941, Crüger and led his group in an attack against a British task force southwest of Crete. The group claimed three hits on the aircraft carrier HMS Formidable earning him a reference on 30 March 1941 in the Wehrmachtbericht (armed forces report), an information bulletin issued by the headquarters of the Wehrmacht. Crüger married the German actress Carola Höhn on 13 September 1941 at the German consulate in Rome. The marriage produced a posthumous son, Michael, who was born on 25 March 1942.

After his wedding vacation Crüger took command as Geschwaderkommodore (wing commander) of the Schnellkampfgeschwader 210 on 30 September 1941 at the Eastern Front. He then became Geschwaderkommodore of Kampfgeschwader 77 on 13 March 1942. Fighting in the Mediterranean theater of operations Crüger went missing in action on 22 March 1942. Flying the Junkers Ju 88 A-4 3Z+AA (Werknummer 8627—factory number) he failed to return from a combat mission against the British forces on Malta. Crüger and his crew, Oberfeldwebel Erich Atzler, Oberfeldwebel Kurt Raithel and Oberfeldwebel Walter Wagner, appear to have been shot down by Royal Navy AA fire while attacking shipping en route to Malta.

== Awards ==
- Anschluss Medal (2 October 1938)
- Sudetenland Medal (25 August 1939)
- Iron Cross (1939)
  - 2nd Class (17 March 1940)
  - 1st Class (4 May 1940)
- Officer of the Order of the Crown of Romania (6 May 1940)
- Front Flying Clasp of the Luftwaffe for Bomber Pilots in Gold
  - in Silver (19 May 1941)
  - in Gold (15 October 1941)
- Knight's Cross of the Iron Cross on 19 June 1940 as Hauptmann and Staffelkapitän of the 5./Kampfgeschwader 30 (Note: According to Scherzer as Staffelkapitän of the 3./Kampfgeschwader 30.)

== Notes ==
Military offices
Preceded by Major Walter Storp	Commander of Schnellkampfgeschwader 210; 30 September 1941 – 4 January 1942	Succeeded by redesignated Stab/Zerstörergeschwader 1
Preceded by created from Stab/Schnellkampfgeschwader 210	Commander of Zerstörergeschwader 1; 4 January 1942 – 2 March 1942	Succeeded by Major Ulrich Diesing
Preceded by Oberstleutnant Johann Raithel	Commander of Kampfgeschwader 77; 13 March 1942 – 22 March 1942	Succeeded by Major Wilhelm Stremmler
