= Joachim Blechschmidt =

German fighter ace and Knight's Cross recipient (1912–1943)

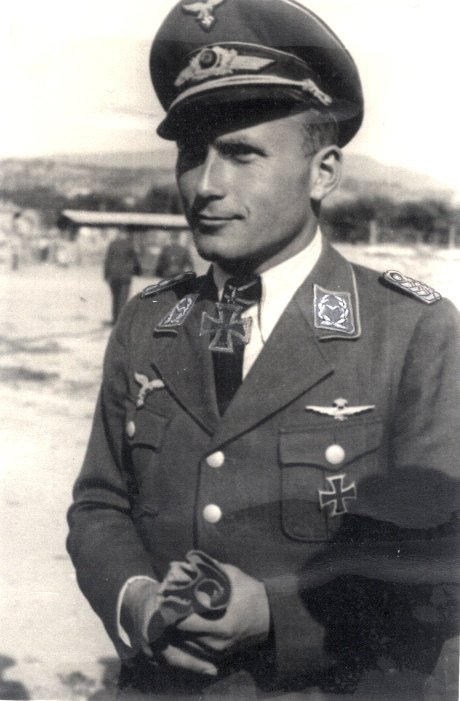
- Joachim Blechschmidt (1941)
- Born: 28 December 1912; Schleiz
- Died: 13 July 1943 (aged 30) M.I.A. disappeared near Orel, Russia
- Military career
- Allegiance: Nazi Germany
- Branch: Luftwaffe
- Service years: ? – 1943
- Rank: Oberstleutnant (Posthumously)
- Commands: I./ZG 1 ZG 1
- Conflicts: World War II: Invasion of Poland; Battle of France; Battle of Britain; Operation Barbarossa; Battle of Stalingrad; Battle of Kursk
- Awards: Knight's Cross of the Iron Cross

Joachim Blechschmidt (* 28 December 1912 in Schleiz/Thuringia; missing since 13 July 1943 after shooting down near Oryol/Central Russia) was a German lieutenant colonel in the German Air Force during the Second World War. He is counted among the aces of the German Air Force.

== Biography ==
Joachim Blechschmidt was born on 28 December 1912 in Schleiz/Thuringia (Germany) as the youngest of twelve children of the grammar school professor and pastor Heinrich Blechschmidt (1867-1946) and his wife Maria, née Kruse (1875-1918). His childhood was overshadowed by the First World War and the early death of his mother. After his secondary school time in Schleiz he decided to become an officer in the police force and was taken over by the army in Worms with a patent from April 1, 1934. There he realised his dream to become a pilot. In 1940 he married Gabriele Döber, at that time living in Katowice/Upper Silesia (today Poland), who, according to his official missing persons report on August 1, 1944, is said to have emigrated to the USA at the end of the Second World War. The marriage was childless.

== Military career ==
After a strict entrance examination in Jena-Rödinger he came to Perleburg in Priegnitz in 1935, where he was trained as a fighter pilot. From 1939 to 1942 he was a combat and transport pilot. During this time he took part in the campaigns to Poland (September 1939), France (May to June 1940) and the Battle of Britain (July to November 1940). For his merits he was awarded the Iron Cross second and first class. On 24 April 1941 he was promoted to captain and became captain of a squadron Ju 52 of the second transport squadron (Battle Group for Special Use 9). In June 1941 his squadron was transferred to Russia, where it participated in the Operation Barbarossa until December 1941. On 4 February 1942 he received the German Cross in Gold for his outstanding achievements. On 20 August 1942, he became Group Commander of I. Gruppe I of Zerstörergeschwader 1 ("Wespengeschwader" because of the wasp emblem on the nose section of the aircraft), equipped with heavy twin-engined Messerschmitt Bf 110 fighter aircraft. His squadron was instrumental in the crushing of strong enemy attacks on the Stalingrad Front. Major Blechschmidt and his group flew missions in the Great Don Arc from an airfield surrounded by the enemy, probably Tazinskaya. Although Soviet tanks advanced to the edge of the airfield, the destroyer group under his command flew rolling missions against tanks, artillery and infantry positions of the Soviets despite the lowest cloud height, snowdrift and lowest visibility conditions and despite the artillery and mortar fire lying on the airfield. These flights led to the prevention of an enemy breakthrough. On 17 March 1943 he was awarded the Knight's Cross of the Iron Cross shortly afterwards he was promoted to Major and on 12 April 1943 to Commander of Destroyer Squadron 1. On 13 July 1943 he was shot down by Noël Castelain in air combat with Soviet and Allied fighters east of Orel near Ulyanovo-Bolkhov. He succeeded with his Bf 110 G-2 (W.No. 6295) "S9+BA" in an emergency landing with burning engines behind enemy lines. Together with his radio operator, Sergeant Wörl, he was able to leave the aircraft alive and take refuge in a Russian occupied forest. He was subsequently promoted to lieutenant colonel in absence. On August 1, 1944 he was officially listed as missing. According to Soviet sources, he fell into Russian captivity, further whereabouts unknown, and is believed to have shot down two Russian fighter planes of the type Lavochkin LaGG-3 on March 25, 1943, and a La-5 on May 10 of the same year. By 2 April 1943 he had carried out 400 enemy flights and achieved 17 air victories, all on the Eastern Front.

== Awards ==
- Front Flying Clasp of the Luftwaffe
- Iron Cross (1939)
  - 2nd Class
  - 1st Class
- German Cross in Gold on 4 February 1942 as Hauptmann in Kampfgruppe zbV 9
- Knight's Cross of the Iron Cross on 17 March 1943 as Major and Gruppenkommandeur of I./Zerstörergeschwader 1
