= Zerstörergeschwader 1 =

Heavy/destroyer Fighter Aircraft-wing of World War II

- ZG 1 emblem depicting a wasp, or hornet
- Country: Nazi Germany
- Branch: Luftwaffe
- Type: Heavy fighter
- Role: air superiority night fighter surgical strike close air support Offensive counter air
- Size: Air Force Wing
- Nickname: Wespe (Wasp)
- Fighter Aircraft: Messerschmitt Bf 110

Insignia
- Identification symbol: Geschwaderkennung of 2N

Aircraft flown
- Fighter: Bf 109, Bf 110, Me 210

Zerstörergeschwader 1 (ZG 1—1st Destroyer Wing) (lit. destroyer wing) was a Luftwaffe zerstörer or ‘destroyer’ (heavy fighter) wing of World War II.

== Formation ==
Zerstörergeschwader 1 (ZG 1—1st Destroyer Wing) was formed with two Gruppen (groups) before the war. Initially, no Geschwaderstab (headquarters unit) nor III. Gruppe (3rd group) was formed. I. Gruppe (1st group) was formed by renaming II(s). Gruppe (2nd group) of Jagdgeschwader 132 "Richthofen" (JG 132—132nd Fighter Wing) to I. Gruppe of Zerstörergeschwader 141 (ZG 141—141st Destroyer Wing) on 1 November 1938 flying the Messerschmitt Bf 109 single engine fighter. On 1 May 1939, I. Gruppe of ZG 141 became I. Gruppe of ZG 1. During this entire time, the Gruppe was commanded by Major Joachim-Friedrich Huth. This unit was initially based at Jüterbog-Damm Airfield in Jüterbog until it was moved to Mackfitz, present-day Makowice in north-western Poland, on 24 August 1939.

The II. Gruppe was formed on 15 May 1939 at Fürstenwalde and was also equipped with the Bf 109. The Gruppe had originally been formed as II(l). Gruppe of Jagdgeschwader 135 (JG 135—135th Fighter Wing). It was then renamed to I. Gruppe of Jagdgeschwader 333 (JG 333—333th Fighter Wing) on 1 November 1938 which was then briefly given the designation I. Gruppe of Jagdgeschwader 54 (JG 54—54th Fighter Wing) on 1 May 1939. During this creation process, the Gruppe was commanded by Major Rudolf Stoltenhoff, who turned over command to Major Hellmut Reichard on 15 May 1939.

== World War II ==
=== Invasion of Poland and Phoney War ===
On the outbreak of World War II the unit was based with 1. Fliegerdivision in Central Germany. During the German invasion of Poland ZG 1 was part of Luftflotte 3. Only the I. Gruppe was fit for action at Mühlen Eichsen. The group operated the Bf 110 C. The division and air fleet supported the 4th army on most northern part of the line as it advanced to capture Danzig and Bydgoszcz. Only three of the ten Zerstörergruppen were genuine units (I./ZG 1, I./ZG 76, I(Z)./LG 1). The rest were given Bf 109s and nominated Jagdgruppen (for example II./ZG 1 was renamed II./JGr 101). Among the operational Bf 110 units there were barely 100 aircraft available. Little is known of I./ZG 1's activities other than the fact that they were the least successful of all the fighter units in Poland. In one long-range fighter escort mission I./ZG 1 claimed two Polish fighters but lost Hauptmann von Freiherr Mullenheim.

In December 1939 II./Trägergruppe 186 (Carrier Air Group 186; TrGr 186) which was officially attached to ZG 1 but placed under Stab./JG 1 for defensive duties under Major Heinrich Seeliger. JGr 101 was attached to ZG 1 and eventually became II./ZG 1. It was commanded by Major Hellmuth Reichardt. JGr. 101 fought in the Battle of the Heligoland Bight. Only a rotte from 3. Staffel made contact with the bombers and claimed two. Dietrich Robitzsch wrote off a Bf 109. Two more pilots were wounded.

In April 1940 ZG 1 was subordinated to Fliegerkorps X for Operation Weserübung, the German invasion of Denmark and Norwegian Campaign on 6 April, three days before the invasion began. I. Gruppe was commanded by Wolfgang Falck, a pioneer of night fighter operations. 3./ZG 1 escorted 28 Heinkel He 111 bombers from KG 4 on a demonstration flight over Copenhagen. Falck led I./ZG 1 to attack the Royal Danish Air Force base at Vaerlose where four Fokker D.XXI were taking off. Falck shot one down. 13 other Danish fighters, including Fokker C.Vs, were strafed and destroyed. I./ZG 1 at Aalborg experienced repeated air attacks by RAF Bomber Command. Falck arranged interception procedures with the local commanding officer to enable interceptions in dusk hours. He led three Bf 110s in an interception on 30 April, and although these did not yield a victory, Falck was invited to Berlin to discuss his ideas with Ernst Udet, Erhard Milch, and Albert Kesselring, though the senior command was preoccupied with Fall Gelb, the coming Battle of Belgium and Battle of France. Falck was sure that a Bf 110 unit could defend the airspace at night with assistance from radar operators. Falck convinced Kesselring, Milch and Udet at the RLM. Hermann Göring, commander-in-chief of the Luftwaffe, ordered Falck to create a Nachtjagdgeschwader at Düsseldorf on 22 June 1940. He formed Nachtjagdgeschwader 1. In the first week of May 1940, I./ZG 1 was seconded to Fall Gelb, and was replaced at Aalborg by I(J)./LG 2.

=== Battle of the Low Countries and France, operations over Switzerland ===
ZG 1 was assigned to Luftflotte 2. I./ZG 1 was based at Kirchhellen with 22 of the 35 Bf 110s operational. II./ZG 1 had 26 of its 36 Bf 110s operational at Gelsenkirchen. Of the 145 Bf 110s in the air fleet, just 82 were combat ready on 10 May 1940. ZG 26 supported ZG 1 in heavy fighter operations. The unit fought in the Battle of the Netherlands. ZG 1 was engaged in the Offensive counter air operations against the Royal Dutch Air Force on 10 May. 4. Staffel is known to have fought in combat with the Dutch 5e JaVA (5th Fighter Unit) which cost it one aircraft. One flight of ZG 1 Bf 110s shot down five from six Bristol Blenheims from No. 600 Squadron RAF, which had taken off from RAF Manston to bomb Waalhaven.

On 11 May RAF Bomber Command sent No. 18 and No. 53 to bomb the Albert Canal near Maastricht. Four Bristol Blenheims failed to return; one was a victim of JG 1, two to ground-fire, but the other fell to Bf 110s from II./ZG 1. ZG 1 continued counter-air operations by strafing airfields. I. and II. Gruppe attacked Haamstede, Flushing, and Oostvoorne. I./ZG 1 claimed 26 Dutch aircraft on the ground. True Dutch losses are unstated. The command flight of II./ZG 1 encountered No. 615 Squadron RAF and the British unit lost one pilot killed near Courrière. ZG 1 conducted patrols during the Battle of Gembloux, a major engagement in the Battle of Belgium, and accounted for a No. 87 Squadron RAF pilot killed near the town on 14 May. No. 87 and ZG 1 clashed again later in the day. Along with No. 79 Squadron RAF, they attempted to attack He 111s from II./LG 1 near Brussels. Three German bombers were shot down but it cost No. 79 Squadron one pilot killed. No. 87 Squadron lost one Hawker Hurricane and its pilot was wounded in action with 1./ZG 1. The air battles were costly; over the 10 to 13 May, ZG 1 and ZG 26 lost five Bf 110s between them [breakdown unknown]. On 14 May 5./ZG 1 lost its Staffelkapitän Hauptmann Kiippers during a full-scale strafing of Vlissingen airfield. On 16 May, over Brussels, five 1./ZG 1 Bf 110s fought No. 85 and No. 87 Squadrons; the British claimed three though no losses were sustained; one German pilot was wounded. The German unit claimed one, though any RAF casualties in the dogfight are unstated. Later in the day, No. 3 Squadron RAF fighters killed one of ZG 1's crews in combat. In return, Squadron Leader P Gifford DFC was killed in action with 1./ZG 1. ZG 1 are known to have fought in the Battle of Dunkirk; on 1 June 1940 I. Gruppe claimed three Hurricanes over the port.

ZG 1 remained active during Fall Rot, the second phase of the Battle of France. The Luftwaffe had proven successful in the Air interdiction role, but became a victim of its own success when German logistics began to strain because of the infrastructure damage caused by bombing. An effort was made to repair French and Belgian road, bridges and railway lines. Fuel shortages occurred, but I./ZG 1 at Norrent-Fontes, for example, reported 200,000 litres (53,000 US gallons) of aviation fuel on 7 June just days into the beginning of the second offensive. II./ZG 1 was based at Trier-Euren and both served under Jagdfliegerführer 3. German bomber wings were ordered to attack rail traffic in the Rhône and shipping in Marseille. They overflew Switzerland for convenience and as a mark of arrogance in their perceived superiority. The Swiss Air Force intercepted on one occasion, and with some units equipped with German-built Bf 109s, shot down six He 111s. Göring was furious and ordered missions to continue with Bf 110 escort. The second mission resulted in the destruction of one Swiss fighter. The Nazi leaderships obsession with saving face, resulted in II./ZG 1 being ordered to fly missions over Swiss air space. This cost the unit five Bf 110s, and the commanding officer of 6. Staffel on 8 June. Thereafter, operations over Switzerland were stopped.

=== Battle of Britain and Channel Front ===
The Battle of Britain began in July 1940, but ZG 1 was already being broken up to form new units. On 22 June I./ZG 1 became I./Nachtjagdgeschwader 1, a night fighter wing and returned to Germany. On 26 June 1940 II./ZG 1 was renamed III. Gruppe of Zerstörergeschwader 76 (ZG 76—76th Destroyer Wing). ZG 1 had formally ceased to exist for the next 18 months. I. Gruppe retained its Zerstörer status into July 1940 for it is listed on the Quartermaster of the Luftwaffe as I(Nacht)/ZG 1. Two aircraft belonging to this unit were reported destroyed on 25 July; one in action with an RAF bomber and another in an accident. Two crewmen were killed and two wounded.

=== Eastern Front ===
In June 1941 the Wehrmacht and its Allies began Operation Barbarossa, the invasion of the Soviet Union, initiating the war on the Eastern Front. The failure of Barbarossa and the requirement for heavy fighter groups which could act with versatility in a variety of support roles was realised. ZG 1 was to reform, this time with a Stab and three gruppen, common in most Luftwaffe wings. ZG 1 began operations in the Soviet Union in the winter 1941/42, though combat operations did not occur until after 1 January 1942. I./ZG 1 was reformed from I./SKG 210 in January 1942. Stab and I./ZG 1 was assigned to support Army Group South, under Luftflotte 4. The combat units were to support the German defence on the Mius River after their defeat in the Battle of Rostov in December 1941. The Bf 110, which had not succeeded as a fighter aircraft, had been converted to the fighter-bomber role in the Battle of Britain. The type was a success in the night fighter role, neccessating the withdrawal of the Bf 110 from the Eastern Front in late 1941. The need to counter Red Army advances in early 1942 saw a number of night fighter units reconverted back to ground attack units—I. and II./NJG 4 became ZG 26 and their deployment to the Eastern Front weakened the night fighter force. II./ZG 1 was transferred to Wolfram Freiherr von Richthofen's Fliegerkorps VIII to support Army Group Centre and help it defend against the enormous Soviet counter-offensive following the Battle of Moscow.

The Bf 110 Zerstörer pilots were hated by Soviet soldiers for their destructive effect. In the winter battles the roads had been cleared, often leaving huge mountains of snow on either side. Congested columns of men and vehicles proved vulnerable to strafing attacks. German pilots described the appalling effects; Oberleutnant Johannes Kiel remarked they "saw the snow becoming stained red by all the blood." The operations were not without cost to the Germans. II./ZG 1's commanding officer, Hauptmann Rolf Kaldrick killed on 3 February 1942 along with another crew when Soviet MiG-3 fighters intercepted them. The Bf 110 units lost two of their Knight's Cross holders within a week. Kaldrack became the first Zerstörer pilot to receive the Oak Leaves to the Knight's Cross. In the last five days of February 1942 five II./ZG 1 aircraft were shot down. The 120 IAP (Independent Fighter Regiment) were responsible for the majority of these losses. In late March, early April 1942, I./ZG 1 was pulled off the frontlines to rest and recuperate.

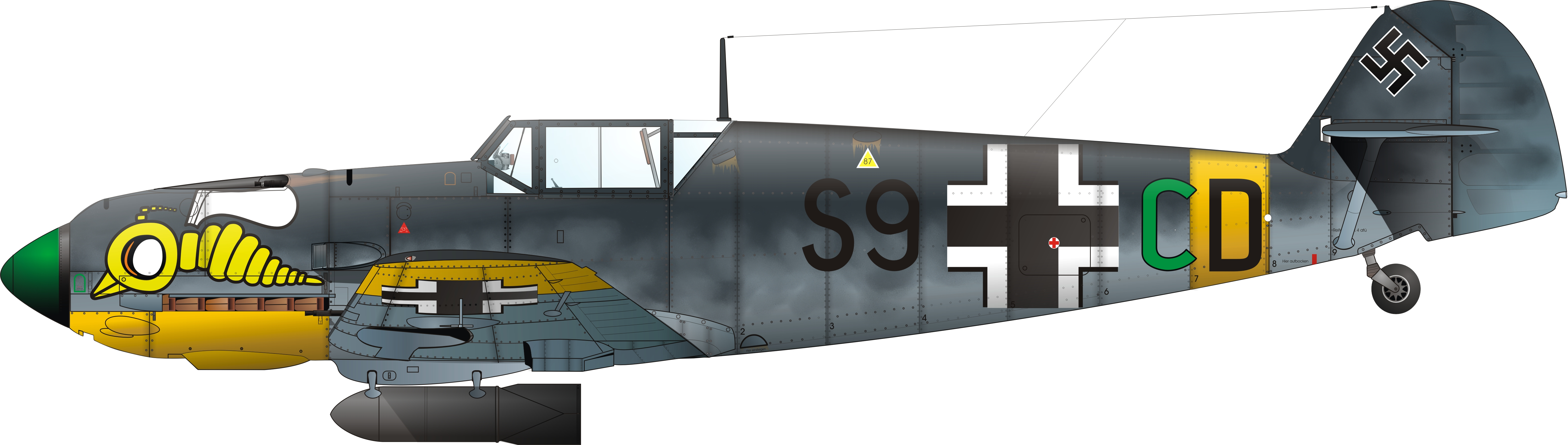
Bf 109E of Zerstörergeschwader 1, still bearing SKG 210's Geschwaderkennung alphanumeric markings

I. and II./ZG 1 returned to the Eastern Front under Luftflotte 4 to support Army Group South in Operation Blue, Hitler's offensive towards the Soviet Caucasus oilfields near Baku on the Caspian Sea. 71 Bf 110s were operational from a total of 108. III./ZG 1, with 7. Staffel of Zerstörergeschwader 2 (ZG 2—2nd Destroyer Wing) attached, was also assigned to the air fleet by 27 July 1942. On 10 June 1942, ZG 1, with ZG 2 and other Luftwaffe units began "Operation Wilhelm" to establish staging areas for Operation Blue near Volchansk. On the first day alone, 20 German aircraft were lost in the ground support role—10 belonged to ZG 1 and ZG 2. By 20 July, Luftflotte 4's number of serviceable aircraft shrank by 45 percent. ZG 2 had to be removed from combat and handed its remaining Bf 110s to ZG 1. At the time of the withdrawal, both heavy fighter wings could muster only 86 combat ready Bf 110s between them. For the battles on the Don bend, ZG 1 was assigned to Kurt Pflugbeil's IV Fliegerkorps in support of Army Group A. In August 1942, ZG 1 supported close air support to Army Group A in the advance south to the Caucasus. On 2 September ZG 1 were attacking areas to the north west of Stalingrad, near Kotluban. Here, they were intercepted by Yak-1s from the 220 IAD and lost three crews, while their opponents suffered one loss. The Red Air Force provided fierce resistance throughout the battles.

During the advance southward, ZG 1 set up a night fighter unit in September 1942, named 10(Nacht) Staffel which produced the successful Josef Kociok. II. Gruppe pilot Rudolf Scheffel emerged as one of ZG 1's purportedly successful anti-tank pilots; he claimed five aircraft shot down and ten times the number of tanks. Scheffel was awarded the Knight's Cross on 29 October 1942. Hans Peterbus from II./ZG 1 was awarded the decoration on 25 November for 18 aircraft shot down, 26 on the ground, and 19 tanks destroyed. I./ZG 1 was given credit for 44 aircraft, 41 tanks, 15 locomotives, 11 artillery guns, and 157 trucks destroyed. The Red Army Operation Uranus turned the tide in the Battle of Stalingrad. ZG 1 was ordered to perform escort fighter roles from their base in Tatsinskaya, for Junkers Ju 52 transports supplied the encircled Axis armies but were not successful. ZG 1 opened the Operation Winter Storm, an attempt to relive the trapped armies, by attacking the Soviet airbase at Abganerovo before reverting to breaking up Soviet lines of resistance. II./ZG 1 lost five aircraft in combat on 16 December 1942. On 26 December ZG 1 and KG 3 attempted to check Soviet advances in the Novaya Kalitva area but accounted strong resistance from Soviet fighters. The 814 IAP claimed five German aircraft shot down on this date. In January 1943, I. and II./ZG 1, with the 13(Pz)/JG 51 and II/SG 1 formed the backbone of the defence at Tatsinskaya and Morozovsk and against the 1st Guards Army at Millerovo and 3rd Guards Army at Morozovsk. Though they were successful in delaying the advances, they did not prevent the encirclement of the German 3rd Mountain Division north of Millerovo. I. and II./ZG 1 made efforts to support the defence of air transport bases at Novocherkassk and Zverevo, thereby keeping open the bottleneck through to Rostov. On 21 January 1943, operations of this kind cost ZG 1 six crews. A last effort was made by I./ZG 1, with support from Stab/JG 3, to fly a long-range patrol over Stalingrad. They returned with two victory claims, but commanding officer Eduard Tratt nearly survived a crash-landing.

Operations were costly. Proportionately, ZG 1's casualties were comparable to the German 6th army in the Battle of Stalingrad. At the end of the year, the two groups could muster a handful of aircraft between them but were still forced into battle. Erhard Milch personally ordered the Six Bf 109s and five Bf 110s left to conduct patrols over the city regardless of the protests of JG 3's commanding officer, coordinating fighter operations near Stlaingrad, that the Bf 110 element was not up to the task. The missions went ahead, with but experienced the expected losses. On 31 January 1943, most of ZG 1 personnel were ordered out of the Soviet Union. II./ZG 1 was sent to the Mediterranean; III./ZG 1 had been in the theatre and North Africa since the previous autumn. I./ZG 1 remained on the front to serve on the central sector from May 1943. On 5 July Stab and I./ZG 1 had 44 Bf 110s, 37 combat ready, to serve in the Battle of Kursk. An independent anti-tank staffel, Pz.Jg.St/ZG 1 operated 12 Bf 110s equipped with BK 3,7 cannon with little success.

=== Mediterranean, African Front and Bay of Biscay ===
III./ZG 1 was sent from the Soviet Union to Crete on 6 August 1942 having suffered grievous losses on the Eastern Front. The unit regrouped, rested and began defensive patrols over convoys, escorting transports between Greece and Sicily. A third of the Luftwaffe was engaged in these activities in the Mediterranean, indicating a shift to the defensive. The unit partially reequipped with Bf 109 E fighter bombers. The group was transferred to Africa (under Luftflotte 2) and fought in the North African Campaign. On 1 September 1942, Hauptmann Roland Borth was shot down over El Alamein and died of wounds eight days later. The gruppe lost another pilot killed on 17 September. Personnel from III./ZG 1, with fighter-bomber staffeln from JG 27 and JG 53 were used to form the nucleus of II./SG 2 on 30 September 1942. III./ZG 1 fought on as the German front at Alamein collapsed and saw action in the Battle of Tunisia. Two of the new Messerschmitt Me 210s were lost to Sptifires on 13 November. The following day one of the few victory claims for the group, a Bristol Beaufort, was claimed. On 18 November, two pilots were killed over Apollonia. A week later, one Me 210 was shot down and two damaged in combat over Tunis. The group was operating the Focke-Wulf Fw 190 at this stage; one was reported damaged over Bizerte.

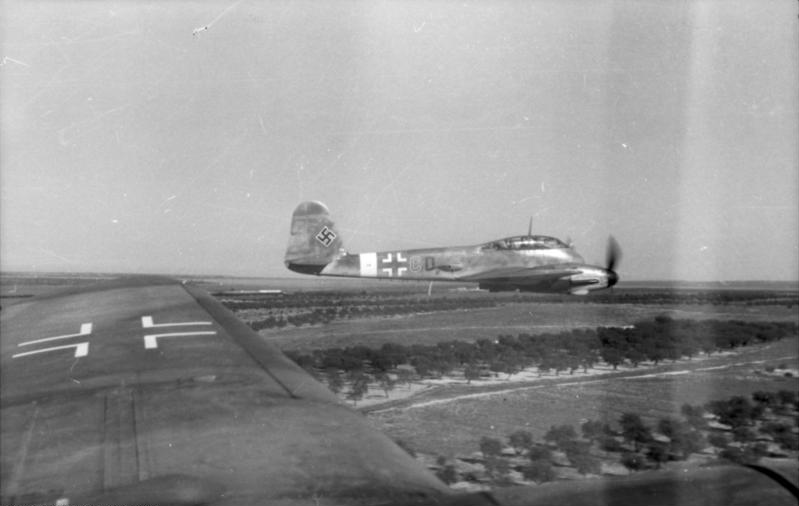
Me 210 over Tunisia, 1942. The aircraft coded "CD" in this photo has been identified as belonging to III./ZG 1.

On 6 March III./ZG 1 managed to deliver a surprise attack on the airfield at Neffatia. One 2 Squadron SAAF P-40 was damaged. On 25 March 1943, III./ZG 1 were forced to jettison their bombs early in the face of fighter opposition. Seven Messerschmitt Me 210s, which now equipped the group, were damaged in an air raid on Sfax on 29 March 1943. The following day, 12 Me 210s escorted by 18 Bf 109s dropped their bombs over their own lines for a second time when they sighted 12 Spitfires from No. 92 Squadron RAF, covering P-40s on an armed reconnaissance. Operation Flax began in April 1943. The Allied powers sought to use large numbers of fighters to cut the air bridge from Tunisia to Sicily and prevent the Axis forces supplying their divisions in Africa. III./ZG 1, with III./ZG 26, used Sicily as their base from this time. The heavy fighter gruppen were attached to Theo Osterkamp's Jagdfliegerführer Sizilien. On 5 April, the operation's first day, eight ZG 1 Me 210s were damaged by bombs at their base near Trapani. Two were shot down. On 9 April III./ZG 1 claimed four US-flown Spitfires for two losses. Only one US Spitfire was shot down in air combat; the 2nd Squadron 52nd Fighter Group pilot survived. On 10 April ZG 1 lost one Bf 110 in a collision with a Lockheed P-38 Lightning form the US 82nd Fighter Group over Cape Bon while escorting Ju 52s. The Allied operation was a resounding success. 432 Axis aircraft were destroyed at a cost of 35 fighters. Coupled with the Stalingrad losses, the German air transport fleet never recovered from Flax.

After the capitulation of the Panzer Army Africa on 13 May 1943, ZG 1 was sent to Germany for Reichsverteidigung, Defence of the Reich duties against the United States Army Air Force Eighth Air Force and Fifteenth Air Force in August 1943. The exception was III./ZG 1, which was sent to France. III./ZG 1 operated from France for two weeks with the new Messerschmitt Me 410 but soon departed for Germany. II./ZG 1 briefly replaced it. The group stayed for 10 weeks and lost 12 Bf 110s. In October 1943, I./ZG 1 was disbanded to become I./ZG 26. Some staffeln of the former I./ZG 1 was merged into V./KG 40 and subordinated to Fliegerführer Atlantik. The purpose of their transfer was to provide air cover for German U-boats as RAF Coastal Command intensified its anti-submarine warfare operations in the Bay of Biscay. Based at Bordeaux, ZG 1 conducted heavy fighter patrols with their newly arrived Junkers Ju 88C heavy fighters. They achieved 137 interceptions and claimed 69 aircraft shot down. The Luftwaffe's bid to protect U-boats over the Bay of Biscay in 1943 cost it 122 aircraft; 79 to enemy action including 48 Zerstörer. Coastal Command ended its 41-month offensive in the Bay in May 1944. It sank 50 U-Boats and lost 350 aircraft. ZG 1 suffered in the air battles. On 10 March 1944, for example, while escorting an Imperial Japanese Navy submarine it lost half its aircraft plus commanding officer Oberstleutnant Janson. In escorting U-225 a month later it lost seven Ju 88s and claimed four de Havilland Mosquitos. By the D-day landings ZG 1 had destroyed only 10 Coastal Command aircraft in 1944. U-boat crews accounted for 12. ZG 1 provided up to 24-strong formations of fighter escort for KG 26 anti-shipping aircraft in aerial attacks on ships, but this did not prevent their charges for suffering heavy losses to long-range fighters and Allied return fire.

=== Defence of the Reich, disbandment ===
ZG 1, ZG 26 and ZG 76 joined the RLV in the autumn, 1943. The resurrection of the Zerstörergeschwader was ordered because the Oberkommando der Luftwaffe still believed the destructive power of the Bf 110 and Me 410 would prove decisive against unescorted American heavy bombers. II./ZG 1 was placed in Austria, the prime operating area of the US Fifteenth Air Force. III./ZG 1 was renamed II./ZG 26, but then immediately refounded in France and joined I./ZG 1 flying maritime operations. III./ZG 1, under the command of Major Karl Boehm-Tettlebach, operated Me 410s armed with the Werfer-Granate 21 air-to-air mortar. On 10 October 1943 III./ZG 1 went into action, leading III./ZG 26, as the Eighth Air Force attacked Münster. The 2. Jagddivision moved north to provide north as part of a 350-fighter strong intercept force. ZG 1 attacked the 14th Bombardment Wing, 3rd Bombardment Division, already shattered by single-engine fighter units. The Zerstörer pilots attacked from the rear while Bf 109 and Fw 190 units attacked head-on. As it appeared the leading element was to be annihilated, the US 56th Fighter Group appeared and broke up the assault. The German units destroyed 30 B-17 Flying Fortress bombers, one P-47 Thunderbolt, losing 25 fighters and 12 airmen. Nine of those losses were Zerstörer. It was clear to the Luftwaffe that these aircraft had to be shielded from US escorts.

Four days later was the Second Raid on Schweinfurt. The 3. Jagddivision was overwhelmed and so every Zerstörer unit in Germany and Austria was ordered to help. Seven Zerstörer gruppen filed claims (11 nachtjagdgruppen also claimed). The Eighth lost 60 bombers, with another seven scrapped. The RLV lost 38 fighters. II./ZG 1 remained in Austria, the sole representative of the wing in the RLV uppon the renaming of III./ZG 1. By early 1944 it shared Fels-am-Wagram airbase with JG 27. Operations continued into 1944. On 7 January II./ZG 1 attempted to intercept the US Fifteenth's attack on Wiener Neustadt and lost one aircraft to the US 14th Fighter Group without success. On 24 February the Eighth began a three-stage attack on Gotha, Schweinfurt and Rostock. The Fifteenth sent the 5th Bombardment Wing to Steyr. The lack of fighters caused the staff to provide fighters for the withdrawal phase only. II./ZG 1 reacted and succeeded in reaching the bombers. II./ZG 1 reported contact near Klagenfurt and reported numerous victories. 19 B-17s and 21 Consolidated B-24 Liberators were destroyed. P-38 fighter groups could claim only one victory for three losses. By mid-June 1944, ZG 1 was based in Vienna, part of 8. Jagddivision. On 13 June 1944, II./ZG 1, with I./JG 300, I./JG 302, I./ZG 76 claimed 20 B-24s one P-38, two P-51 Mustangs. Actual losses were nine B-24s, two B-17s, seven P-38s and one P-51. US fighters claimed 40; 16 German and Royal Hungarian Air Force fighters were lost.

On 26 June 1944, the Fifteenth sent 677 bombers to attack six oil refineries. II./ZG 1 and JG 300 were ordered to intercept the bomber stream heading to Moosbierbaum. 27 Bf 110s of II./ZG 1 observed the 304th Bombardment Wing begin its bomb run, and noticed the 455th Bombardment Group far out from the main stream. They attacked head-on and achieved several successes before 61 fighters from JG 300 attacked. The 455th Group lost 10 B-24s, its worst day of the war. II./ZG 1 claimed four but lost five killed, two wounded, and four Bf 110s. On 27 June II./ZG 1 and I./ZG 76 intercepted the 460th Bombardment Group on a raid to Budapest and shot down four over Lake Balaton. Another attack on the city on 2 July involved 22 of the group's aircraft. Though the unit only lost one fighter it claimed no victory. Other units suffered high losses.

In mid-1944, the RLV (now Luftflotte Reich) made several organisational changes. I./ZG 1 ceased to exist and became II./JG 4, with the heavily armed "sturm" Fw 190 A-8/R-2. A Bf 109 G group was formed from III./ZG 1, which was disbanded and formed as III./JG 4. It took time to convert the ex-ZG 1 pilots onto Fw 190s and Bf 109s. By the end of July 1944 most of the Zerstörergeschwader were no longer operational and had been converted to single-engine fighter units. The last surviving ZG 1 unit, II. Gruppe ZG 1 became III./JG 76, which had been formed mostly from ZG 76.

== Commanding officers ==
- Major Arved Crüger, 4 January 1942 – 2 March 1942
- Major Ulrich Diesing, 3 March 1942 – 21 September 1942
- Oberstleutnant Ralph von Rettberg (acting), 22 September 1942 – 5 October 1942
- Oberstleutnant Paul-Friedrich Darjes, 6 October 1942 – 1 March 1943
- Oberstleutnant Alfred Druschel (acting), 1 March 1943 – 12 April 1943
- Oberstleutnant Joachim Blechschmidt, 12 April 1943 – 13 July 1943
- Oberstleutnant Lothar von Janson, 1943 – 10 March 1944
- Oberstleutnant Erich von Selle, March 1944 – July 1944

=== I Gruppe of ZG 1 ===
- Major Joachim-Friedrich Huth, 1 May 1939 – 13 December 1939
- Hauptmann Wolfgang Falck, 14 December 1939 – 22 June 1940
- Major Ulrich Diesing, 1 January 1942 – 2 March 1942
- Hauptmann Wolfgang Schenck, 7 March 1942 – 20 August 1942
- Major Joachim Blechschmidt, 20 August 1942 – 12 April 1943
- Haupmann Max Franzisket, 14 April 1943 – 19 July 1943

=== II Gruppe of ZG 1 ===
- Hauptmann Rolf Kaldrack 4 January 1942 – 3 February 1942
- Major Günther Tonne, 4 February 1942 – 1 February 1943
- Major Heinz Nacke, 26 May 1943 – 2 August 1943
- Hauptmann Karl-Heinrich Matern, 3 August 1943 – 8 October 1943
- Hauptmann Egon Albrecht-Lemke, 9 October 1943 – July 1944
