= Ulrich Diesing =

German fighter ace and Knight's Cross recipient

- Born: 12 March 1911; Trebschen, Province of Brandenburg
- Died: 17 April 1945 (aged 34); Boizenburg
- Military career
- Allegiance: Nazi Germany
- Branch: Luftwaffe
- Service years: 1935–1945
- Rank: Generalmajor
- Units: SKG 210; ZG 1
- Commands: I./SKG 210; I./ZG 1 ZG 1
- Conflicts: Spanish Civil War World War II: Eastern Front
- Awards: Knight's Cross of the Iron Cross
- Other work: Police officer

Ulrich Diesing (12 March 1911 – 17 April 1945) was a German pilot in the Luftwaffe during World War II. He was a recipient of the Knight's Cross of the Iron Cross, an award for valor or superior leadership. On 17 April 1945, Ulrich Diesing was killed in an accident near Boizenburg, Germany. During his career he was credited with 15 aerial victories.

== Summary of career ==
=== Awards ===
- Spanish Cross in Gold with Swords
- Aviator badge
- Front Flying Clasp of the Luftwaffe
- Iron Cross (1939)
  - 2nd Class
  - 1st Class
- Knight's Cross of the Iron Cross on 6 September 1942 as Major and Geschwaderkommodore of Zerstörergeschwader 1

=== Dates of rank ===
Police
1 July 1933:	Polizei-Unterwachtmeiser
15 October 1933:	Polizei-Wachtmeister
1 January 1934:	Polizei-Oberwachtmeister
1 December 1934:	Polizei-Leutnant
Wehrmacht
1 February 1935:	Leutnant
1 October 1936:	Oberleutnant
1 June 1939:	Hauptmann
1 April 1942:	Major
1 March 1943:	Oberstleutnant
1 March 1944:	Oberst
11 November 1944:	Generalmajor

Military offices
Preceded by Hauptmann Karl-Heinz Stricker	Commander of I. Schnellkampfgeschwader 210; 15 September 1941 – 1 January 1942	Succeeded by Unit merged with Zerstörergeschwader 1
Preceded by Hauptmann Wolfgang Falck	Commander of I./Zerstörergeschwader 1; 1 January 1942 – 2 March 1942	Succeeded by Hauptmann Walther von Poka
Preceded by Major Arved Crüger	Commander of Zerstörergeschwader 1; 3 March 1942 – 21 September 1942	Succeeded by Oberstleutnant Ralph von Rettberg
