= Schnellkampfgeschwader 210 =

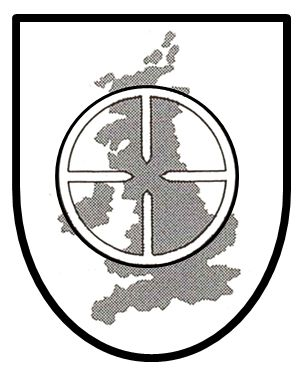
- Active: 1941–1942
- Country: Nazi Germany
- Branch: Luftwaffe
- Type: Bomber wing
- Role: Ground attack
- Size: Air Force Wing
- Engagements: World War II

Schnellkampfgeschwader 210 (SKG 210) was a Luftwaffe fast-bomber wing during the Second World War. The unit was created in April 1941 and absorbed by the Zerstörergeschwader 1 on 4 January 1942.

== Operational history ==
SKG 210 had its origins in Erprobungsgruppe 210 (Test Wing 210), formed at Köln-Ostheim airfield under the command of Hptm. Walter Rubensdörffer in July 1940 as the official service test unit for the new Messerschmitt Me 210, the intended successor to the earlier Messerschmitt Bf 110. Such were the delays in that aircraft's development that the unit was used to develop tactical and strategic practices required to operate the Bf 110s in newer, fighter-bomber and ground-attack roles they were being adapted to. By the time the unit was re-named I. Gruppe, Schnellkampfgeschwader 210 in April 1941 the unit was based at Abbeville, bombing Allied shipping and land-based targets. The unit then moved east to prepare for the attack on Soviet Russia as part of 2nd Air Corps and originally based at Radzyn. II/SKG 210 was formed from III./ZG 76 under command of Hauptmann Rolf Kaldrack.

Some 50 serviceable Bf 110s took part in Operation Barbarossa from two units; Zerstörergeschwader 26 and Schnellkampfgeschwader 210. The Bf 110 provided support to the German Army, carrying out strike missions in the face of heavy AA and ground defences. In the opening air strikes, on 22 June, SKG 210 claimed 344 Soviet aircraft destroyed, more than any other unit, for the loss of 7 Bf 110s destroyed or damaged. SKG 210 flew over the Central part of the front supporting the German army's encirclement and overrunning of Russian land forces in the Białystok and Minsk areas in the early phase of the campaign, and flew in support of the advancing Army Group Centre to Moscow in 1941. Between 22 June 1941 and 26 July 1941 the unit claimed to have destroyed 823 Soviet aircraft on the ground and 92 in the air, 2,136 vehicles and 165 tanks destroyed for 57 Bf 110s lost to enemy action. With the coming of winter SKG 210 continued to operate in support of the army, covering their retreat.

== Commanding officers ==
- Major Walter Storp, 24 April 1941 – 30 September 1941
- Major Arved Crüger, 30 September 1941 – January 1942

== Bibliography ==
- Bergström, Christer [in Swedish] (2007). Barbarossa - The Air Battle: July–December 1941. London: Chevron/Ian Allan. ISBN 978-1-85780-270-2.
