= Luftwaffe order of battle August 1940 =

For its Battle of Britain campaign against Great Britain during World War II, the German Luftwaffe had the following order of battle in the West. Luftflotte 2 was responsible for the bombing of southeast England and the London area and based in the Pas-de-Calais area in France. Luftflotte 3 targeted the West Country, Midlands, and northwest England, from bases a bit further north in France. Luftflotte 5 targeted the north of England and Scotland, from bases in Norway. Luftflotte 1 and Luftflotte 4 were based in Germany, but most of their bomber formations had been reassigned to the three Luftflotten engaged in the Battle of Britain. Some fighters were retained to provide air cover over Germany, however.

== Luftflotte 2 ==
Headquarters in Brussels, Belgium, commanded by Generalfeldmarschall Albert Kesselring, OOB from 13 August 1940.

Wettererkundungstaffel 26 (Weather reconnaissance unit under direct control of Luftflotte 2 )	Brussels–Grimbergen	Independent Staffel	Dornier Do 17, Heinkel He 111, Messerschmitt Bf 110	Brussels-Grimbergen	Regierungsrat Krug

Parent unit	Geschwader Base	Unit (Gruppe/Staffel)	Aircraft type	Unit airfield	Commanding officer
I. Fliegerkorps (Generaloberst Ulrich Grauert), Beauvais
Kampfgeschwader 1 (Major General Karl Angerstein)
	Rosières-en-Santerre	I. Gruppe	Heinkel He 111	Montdidier	Major Ludwig Maier
		II. Gruppe	Heinkel He 111	Montdidier	Obstlt. Benno Kosch
		III. Gruppe	Heinkel He 111	Rosières-en-Santerre	Major Hans Steinwig/ Major Willibald Fanelsa
Kampfgeschwader 76 (Oberst Stefan Fröhlich)
	Cormeilles-en-Vexin	Stab. Gruppe	Dornier Do 17	Cormeilles-en-Vexin	Oberstleutnant Fröhlich
	Cormeilles-en-Vexin	I. Gruppe	Dornier Do 17	Beauvais	Hauptmann Alois Lindmayr
		II. Gruppe	Junkers Ju 88	Creil	Major Friedrich Möericke
		III. Gruppe	Dornier Do 17	Cormeilles-en-Vexin	Major Franz Von Benda
Aufklärungsgruppe 122 (Long-range reconnaissance)
		5. Staffel	Junkers Ju 88, Heinkel He 111, Dornier Do 17P	Haute-Fontaine	Hauptmann Bohm
II. Fliegerkorps (General der Flieger Bruno Lörzer), Ghent.
Kampfgeschwader 2 (Major-General Johannes Fink)
	Arras	I. Gruppe	Dornier Do 17	Épinoy	Major Martin Gutzmann (POW 26 August), not replaced until 4 September.
		II. Gruppe	Dornier Do 17	Arras	Major Paul Weitkus
		III. Gruppe	Dornier Do 17	Cambrai	Major Adolph Fuchs
Kampfgeschwader 3 (Oberstleutnant von Chamier-Glisczinski)
	Le Culot	I. Gruppe	Dornier Do 17	Le Culot	Oblt. Gabelmann
		II. Gruppe	Dornier Do 17	Antwerp/Deurne	Hptm. Pilger
		III. Gruppe	Dornier Do 17	Sint-Truiden	Hptm. Rathmann
Kampfgeschwader 53 (Oberstleutnant Stahl)
	Lille-Nord	I. Gruppe	Heinkel He 111	Lille-Nord	Major Kauffmann
		II. Gruppe	Heinkel He 111	Lille-Nord	Major Winkler
		III. Gruppe	Heinkel He 111	Lille-Nord	Major Edler von Braun
Sturzkampfgeschwader 1 (Hauptmann Keil)
	Pas-de-Calais	II. Gruppe	Junkers Ju 87	Pas de Calais	Hptm. A. Keil
		IV. Gruppe	Junkers Ju 87	Tramecourt	Hptm. Von Brauchitsch
Erprobungsgruppe 210 (Hauptmann Rubensdörffer)
	Calais-Marck	1. Staffel	Messerschmitt Bf 110	Calais-Marck	Oblt. M. Lutz
		2. Staffel	Messerschmitt Bf 110	Calais-Marck	Oblt. W-R. Rössinger
		3. Staffel	Messerschmitt Bf 109	Calais-Marck	Oblt. O. Hintze
Lehrgeschwader 2
	1–4 August: Unknown	I. (Jagd) Gruppe	Messerschmitt Bf 109	Leeuwarden (to 4 August)/Calais	Hptm Hanns Trübenbach (to 18 August), Hptm Bernhard Mieklke (21–30 August, KIA)
		II.(Schlacht) Gruppe	Messerschmitt Bf 109	Most of the unit was based at Böblingen, elements moved to Calais on 13 August	Hptm Otto Weiß
		7(F). Gruppe	Messerschmitt Bf 110	Ghent/Brussels	Probably Hptm Hans Schäfer
		9.(H). Gruppe (Pz)	Henschel Hs 126, Messerschmitt Bf 110	Unknown location in Belgium	Probably an Oblt Wöbbeking
9. Flieger-Division later IX. Fliegerkorps (Generalmajor Joachim Coeler), Soesterberg.
Kampfgeschwader 4 (Oberstleutnant Hans-Joachim Rath)
	Soesterberg	I. Gruppe	Heinkel He 111	Soesterberg	Hptm. Nikolaus-Wolfgang Meissner
		II. Gruppe	Heinkel He 111	Eindhoven	Major Dr. Gottlieb Wolf
		III. Gruppe	Junkers Ju 88	Amsterdam/Schiphol	Hptm. Erich Bloedorn
Kampfgruppe 100 (Pathfinder bombers)		Autonomous Gruppe	Heinkel He 111	Vannes	Hauptmann Aschenbrenner
Küstengruppe 126 (Minelaying)	Various	Autonomous Gruppe	Heinkel He 111		
Aufklärungsgruppe 122		3. Staffel	Junkers Ju 88, Heinkel He 100	Eindhoven	Oberstleutnant Koehler
Jagdfliegerführer 2 (Generalmajor Theodor "Theo" Osterkamp), Wissant
Jagdgeschwader 3 (Oberstleutnant Viek)
	Samer	I. Gruppe	Messerschmitt Bf 109	Colembert	Hptm. Hans von Hahn
		II. Gruppe	Messerschmitt Bf 109	Samer	Hptm. Erich von Selle
		III. Gruppe	Messerschmitt Bf 109	Desvres	Hptm. W. Kienitz
Jagdgeschwader 26 (Major Handrick)
	Audembert	I. Gruppe	Messerschmitt Bf 109	Audenbert	Hptm. K. Fischer
		II. Gruppe	Messerschmitt Bf 109	Marquise	Hptm. K. Ebbighausen
		III. Gruppe	Messerschmitt Bf 109	Caffiers	Major Adolf Galland
Jagdgeschwader 51 (Major Werner Mölders)
	Wissant	I. Gruppe	Messerschmitt Bf 109	Wissant	Hptm. Brustellin
		II. Gruppe	Messerschmitt Bf 109	Wissant	Hptm. G. Matthes
		III. Gruppe	Messerschmitt Bf 109	St.Omer	Major Hannes Trautloft
Jagdgeschwader 52 (Major von Bernegg)
	Coquelles	I. Gruppe	Messerschmitt Bf 109	Coquelles	Hptm. S. von Eschwege
		II. Gruppe	Messerschmitt Bf 109	Peuplingne	Hptm. Von Kornatzki
Jagdgeschwader 54 (Major Mettig)
	Campagne	I. Gruppe	Messerschmitt Bf 109	Guînes	Hptm. Hubertus von Bonin
		II. Gruppe	Messerschmitt Bf 109	Hermalinghen	Hptm. Winterer
		III. Gruppe	Messerschmitt Bf 109	Guînes	Hptm. Ultsch
Lehrgeschwader 2
	Calais-Marck	I. Gruppe	Messerschmitt Bf 109	Calais-Marck	Major Hans Trubenbach
Zerstörergeschwader 26 (Oberstleutnant Joachim-Friedrich Huth)
	Lille	Stabschwarme	Messerschmitt Bf 110	Lille	Oberstleutnant Huth
	Lille	I. Gruppe	Messerschmitt Bf 110	Yvrench	Hptm. Wilhelm Makrocki
		II. Gruppe	Messerschmitt Bf 110	Crécy	Hptm. Ralph von Rettberg
		III. Gruppe	Messerschmitt Bf 110	Barley	Hptm. Johann Schalk
Zerstörergeschwader 76 (Major Walter Grabmann)
	Laval	Stabschwarme	Messerschmitt Bf 110	Laval	Major Grabmann
	Laval	II. Gruppe	Messerschmitt Bf 110	Abbeville	Maj Erich Groth
	Laval	III. Gruppe	Messerschmitt Bf 110	Laval	Hptm. Friedrich-Karl Dickoré

== Luftflotte 3 ==
Headquarters in Paris, France, under Generalfeldmarschall Hugo Sperrle. OOB from 13 August 1940.

Wettererkundungstaffel 51 (Weather reconnaissance unit under direct control of Luftflotte 3 )	Versailles–Buc	Independent Staffel	Dornier Do 17, Heinkel He 111,	Versailles-Buc	Regierungsrat Dr. Felber

Parent unit	Geshwader Base	Unit (Gruppe/Staffel)	Aircraft type	Unit airfield	Commanding officer
IV. Fliegerkorps (Generalleutnant Kurt Pflugbeil), Dinard
Lehrgeschwader 1 (Oberstleutnant Alfred Bülowius)
	Orléans/Bricy	I. Gruppe	Junkers Ju 88	Orléans/Bricy	Hptm. W. Kern
		II. Gruppe	Junkers Ju 88	Orléans/Bricy	Major Debratz
		III. Gruppe	Junkers Ju 88	Châteaudun	Major Dr. Ing. Ernst Bormann
Kampfgeschwader 27 (Oberst Gerhard Conrad)
	Tours	I. Gruppe	Heinkel He 111	Tours	Major Gerhard Ulbricht
		II. Gruppe	Heinkel He 111	Dinard	Major Friedrich-Karl Schlichting
		III. Gruppe	Heinkel He 111	Rennes	Major Manfred Freiherr von Sternberg
Kampfgeschwader 40 (Long range reconnaissance) Oberst Ernst-August Roth (as of 1 August)
		Stabschwarme	Junkers Ju 88	Brest-Guipavas	Oberst Ernst-August Roth
		I. Gruppe	Focke-Wulf Fw 200	Brest-Guipavas	Hptm Edmund Daser
Sturzkampfgeschwader 3 (Oberst Angerstein)
		Stabschwarme	Junkers Ju 87 and Dornier Do 17	Caen	
Kampfgruppe 806 (Maritime bombers) (Oberst)
			Junkers Ju 88	Nantes	Hptm. W. Siegel
Aufklärungsgruppe 31 (Long-range reconnaissance)		3. Staffel	Dornier Do 17, Junkers Ju 88, Messerschmitt Bf 110	Rennes	Hauptmann Sieckemus
Aufklärungsgruppe 121 (Long-range reconnaissance)		3. Staffel	Junkers Ju 88	North-West France	Hauptmann Kerber
V. Fliegerkorps (General der Flieger Robert Ritter von Greim) Villacoublay
Kampfgeschwader 51 (Major Schulz-Heyn)
	Orly	I Gruppe	Junkers Ju 88	Melun	Major Schulz-Hein
		II Gruppe	Junkers Ju 88	Orly	Major Winkler
		III Gruppe	Junkers Ju 88	Étampes	Major W. Marienfeld
Kampfgeschwader 54 (Oberstleutnant Otto Höhne)
	Évreux	I Gruppe	Junkers Ju 88	Évreux	Hptm. Jobst-Heinrich von Heydebrock
		II Gruppe	Junkers Ju 88	St. Andre-de-L’Eure	Major Kurt Leonhardy (MIA 11 August). Replaced by Hptm Karl-Bernhard Schlaeger (acting). Replaced by Htpm Hans Widmann.
Kampfgeschwader 55 (Oberstleutnant Alois Stoeckl - KIA 14 August). Replaced by Obstlt Hans Korte 15 August
	Villacoublay	I Gruppe	Heinkel He 111	Dreux	Major Joachim Roeber
		II Gruppe	Heinkel He 111	Chartres	Major Friedrich Kless
		III Gruppe	Heinkel He 111	Villacoublay	Hptm Hans Schlemell
Aufklärungsgruppe 14 (Long-range reconnaissance)		4. Staffel	Dornier Do 17, Messerschmitt Bf 110	Cherbourg	Hauptmann von Dewitz
Aufklärungsgruppe 121 (Long-range reconnaissance)		4. Staffel	Dornier Do 17, Junkers Ju 88	Villacoublay	Hauptmann Kerber (?)
VIII. Fliegerkorps (General der Flieger Wolfram Freiherr von Richthofen, Deauville
Sturzkampfgeschwader 1 (Major Hagen)
	Angers	I Gruppe	Junkers Ju 87	Angers	Major P. Hozzel
		II Gruppe	Junkers Ju 87	Angers	Hptm. H. Mahlke
Sturzkampfgeschwader 2 (Major Oskar Dinort)
	Saint-Malo	I Gruppe	Junkers Ju 87	St. Malo	Hptm. H. Hitschold
		II Gruppe	Junkers Ju 87	Lannion	Major W. Enneccerus
Sturzkampfgeschwader 77 (Major Graf von Schönborn)
	Caen	I Gruppe	Junkers Ju 87	Caen	Hptm. von D. zu Lichtenfels
		II Gruppe	Junkers Ju 87	Caen	Hptm. W. Plewig
		III Gruppe	Junkers Ju 87	Caen	Major H. Bode
Lehrgeschwader 1 (Oberstleutnant Bülowius)
	Caen	V. Gruppe	Messerschmitt Bf 110	Caen	Hptm. Horst Liensberger
Aufklärungsgruppe 11 (Long-range reconnaissance)		2. Staffel	Dornier Do 17, Messerschmitt Bf 110	Bernay	
Aufklärungsgruppe 123 (Long-range reconnaissance)		2. Staffel	Dornier Do 17, Junkers Ju 88	Paris	
Jagdfliegerführer 3 (Oberst Werner Junck), Deauville
Jagdgeschwader 2 (Major von Bülow)
	Évreux,	Stabschwarme	Messerschmitt Bf 109	Beaumont-le-Roger	Major von Bülow
	Évreux	I. Gruppe	Messerschmitt Bf 109	Beaumont-le-Roger	Major H. Strumpell
		II. Gruppe	Messerschmitt Bf 109	Beaumont-le-Roger	Major Wolfgang Schellmann
		III. Gruppe	Messerschmitt Bf 109	Le Havre	Major Dr. Erich Mix
Jagdgeschwader 27 (Oberstleutnant Max Ibel)
	Cherbourg-West	Stabschwarme	Messerschmitt Bf 109	Cherbourg-West	Oberstleutnant Max Ibel
	Cherbourg-West	I. Gruppe	Messerschmitt Bf 109	Plumetot	Hptm. Eduard Neumann
		II. Gruppe	Messerschmitt Bf 109	Crépon	Hptm. Lippert
		III. Gruppe	Messerschmitt Bf 109	Carquebut	Hptm. J. Schlichting
Jagdgeschwader 53 (Major Hans-Jürgen von Cramon-Taubadel)
	Cherbourg	Stabschwarme	Messerschmitt Bf 109	Cherbourg	Major von Cramon-Taubadel
	Cherbourg	I. Gruppe	Messerschmitt Bf 109	Rennes	Hptm. Blumensaat
		II. Gruppe	Messerschmitt Bf 109	Dinan	Major Günther Freiherr von Maltzahn
		III. Gruppe	Messerschmitt Bf 109	Sempy & Brest	Hptm. Harro Harder (Hptm. Wolf-Dietrich Wilcke from 13 August)
Zerstörergeschwader 2 (Oberstleutnant Friedrich Vollbracht)
	Toussus-le-Noble	Stabschwarme	Messerschmitt Bf 110	Toussus-le-Noble	Oberstleutnant Vollbracht
	Toussus-le-Noble	I. Gruppe	Messerschmitt Bf 110	Amiens	Hptm. Heinlein
		II. Gruppe	Messerschmitt Bf 110	Guyancourt	Major Carl

== Luftflotte 5 ==
Headquarters in Stavanger, Norway, led by Generaloberst Hans-Jürgen Stumpff. OOB from 13 August 1940.

Parent unit	Geshwader Base	Unit (Gruppe/Staffel)	Aircraft type	Unit airfield	Commanding officer
X. Fliegerkorps (Generalleutnant Hans Geisler) Stavanger
Wettererkundungskette X. Fl.Korps (Weather reconnaissance)	Unit under direct control of X. Fliegerkorps		Heinkel He 111	Stavanger	Regierungsrat Dr. Müller
Kampfgeschwader 26 (Oberstleutnant Karl Frieherr von Wechmar)
	Stavanger	Stabschwarme	Heinkel He 111	Stavanger	Oberstleutnant Fuchs
		I. Gruppe	Heinkel He 111	Stavanger	Major Hermann Busch
		III. Gruppe	Heinkel He 111	Stavanger	Major Waldemar Lerche
Kampfgeschwader 30 (Oberstleutnant Walter Loebel, to 16 August. Replaced by Oberst Herbert Rieckhoff on 17 August.)
	Aalborg	Stabschwarme	Junkers Ju 88	Aalborg	Oberstleutnant Loebel/Oberst Rieckhoff
		I. Gruppe	Junkers Ju 88	Aalborg	Major Fritz Doensch
		II. Gruppe	Junkers Ju 88	Aalborg	Hptm. Karl-Joachim von Symonski
		III. Gruppe	Junkers Ju 88	Aalborg-West	Hptm. Gerhard Kollewe
Zerstörergeschwader 76 (Major Walter Grabmann)
	Stavanger	I. Gruppe	Messerschmitt Bf 110	Stavanger	Hptm. W. Restemeyer
Jagdgeschwader 77 (Hauptmann Hentschel)
	Stavanger	II. Gruppe	Messerschmitt Bf 109	Stavanger/Trondheim	Hptm. Hentschel
Kustenfliegergruppe 506 (Major Eisenbach)
	Stavanger	1. Staffel	Heinkel He 115	Stavanger	-
		2. Staffel	Heinkel He 115	Trondheim, Tromsø	
		3. Staffel	Heinkel He 115	List	-
Aufklärungsgruppe 22 (Long-range reconnaissance) (Oberstleutnant Thomas)		2. Staffel	Dornier Do 17	Stavanger	
		3. Staffel	Dornier Do 17	Stavanger	
Aufklärungsgruppe 120 (Long-range reconnaissance)		1. Staffel	Heinkel He 111, Junkers Ju 88	Stavanger	Major Schub
Aufklärungsgruppe 121 (Long-range reconnaissance)		1. Staffel	Heinkel He 111, Junkers Ju 88	Stavanger	Hauptmann Klinkicht
Aufklärungsgruppe Ob.d.L (Long-range reconnaissance)		1. Staffel	Dornier Do 215, Heinkel He 111, Messerschmitt Bf 110	Stavanger	
Seenotdienst (Air-sea rescue unit)			Heinkel He 59	Sola, Bergen, Trondheim	

== Oberbefehlshaber der Luftwaffe ==
Headquarters in Berlin, Germany, led by Reichsmarschall Hermann Göring. OOB from 13 August 1940.

Parent unit	Geshwader Base	Unit (Gruppe/Staffel)	Aircraft type	Unit airfield	Commanding officer
Aufklärungsgruppe Ob.d.L (Oberstleutnant Theodor Rowehl) Berlin
	Various	1. Staffel	Blohm & Voss BV 142, Dornier Do 215, Dornier Do 217, Heinkel He 111, Junkers Ju 86P, Junkers Ju 88, Messerschmitt Bf 110	Autonomous, no fixed location	
		2. Staffel	Dornier Do 215, Heinkel He 111	Autonomous, no fixed location	
Wettererkundungskette Ob.d.L (Weather reconnaissance) Berlin
	Oldenburg	1. Staffel	Dornier Do 17, Heinkel He 111	Oldenburg	
		2. Staffel	Heinkel He 111	Brest	
Seefliegerverbände (Maritime Patrol) (Generalmajor Hans Ritter) Berlin
Küstenfliegergruppe 406 (Major Stockmann)
	Hörnum	3. Staffel	Dornier Do 18	Hörnum	
		2./106	Dornier Do 18	Rantum	
		2./906	Dornier Do 18	Hörnum	
Küstenfliegergruppe 706 (Major Lessing)
	Stavanger	1./406	Dornier Do 18	Stavanger	
		2./406	Dornier Do 18	Stavanger	
Küstenfliegergruppe 606 (Major Hahn)
	Brest	1. Staffel	Dornier Do 17	Brest	
		2. Staffel	Dornier Do 17	Brest	
		3. Staffel	Dornier Do 17	Brest	
Küstenfliegergruppe 106 (Major Hahn)
	Norderney	1. Staffel	Heinkel He 115	Nordeney	

== See also ==
- German Air Fleets in World War II
- Luftwaffe Organization
- RAF Fighter Command order of battle 1940
