= Ralph von Rettberg =

- Rettberg as a Hauptmann
- Born: 1 March 1911; Bad Homburg, German Empire
- Died: 25 February 2004 (aged 92); Munich, Germany
- Military career
- Allegiance: Nazi Germany
- Branch: Luftwaffe
- Service years: 1931–1945
- Rank: Oberst (colonel)
- Units: ZG 26, ZG 1
- Commands: II./ZG 26; Zerstörergeschwader 1 Zerstörergeschwader 2
- Conflicts: World War II: Battle of France; Battle of Britain; Invasion of Yugoslavia; Operation Barbarossa
- Awards: Knight's Cross of the Iron Cross

Ralph von Rettberg (1 March 1911 – 25 February 2004) was a World War II German Luftwaffe pilot and wing commander. As a fighter ace, he claimed eight enemy aircraft shot down.

== Early life and career ==
On 7 April 1931, he began his pilot training at the Deutsche Verkehrsfliegerschule (DVS—German Air Transport School) at Schleißheim. He and 29 other trainees were part of Kameradschaft 31 (camaraderie of 1931), abbreviated "K 31". Among the members of "K 31" were future Luftwaffe staff officers Bernd von Brauchitsch, Günther Radusch, Günther Lützow, Wolfgang Falck and Hannes Trautloft. von Rettberg graduated from the DVS on 19 February 1932.

On 1 March 1937, von Rettberg was appointed adjutant to Oberst Kurt-Bertram von Döring, the Geschwaderkommodore (wing commander) of Jagdgeschwader 134 "Horst Wessel" (JG 134—134th Fighter Wing). On 1 April 1938, he was appointed Staffelkapitän of 1. Staffel (1st squadron), a squadron of I. Gruppe (1st group) of JG 134, which was based at Dortmund and commanded by Oberstleutnant Hermann Frommherz who was succeeded by Hauptmann Karl Kaschka on 1 February 1939. On 1 November 1938, I. Gruppe was renamed to I. Gruppe of Zerstörergeschwader 142 (ZG 142—142nd Destroyer Wing), a unit which became the I. Gruppe of Zerstörergeschwader 26 (ZG 26—26th Destroyer Wing) on 1 May 1939. In consequence, von Rettberg commanded the 1. Staffel of ZG 142, and later the 1. Staffel of ZG 26. The Gruppe was equipped with the Messerschmitt Bf 109 D-1 fighter. During the prelude of World War II in August 1939, I. Gruppe of ZG 26 deployed to an airfield at Varel.

== World War II ==
On Friday 1 September 1939, German forces invaded Poland starting World War II in Europe. I. Gruppe of ZG 26 was tasked with patrolling the North Sea. In October, the Gruppe began equipping with the Messerschmitt Bf 110 C heavy fighter. In December, I. Gruppe was moved to Lippstadt. Von Rettberg was appointed Gruppenkommandeur (group commander) of II. Gruppe of ZG 26 on 1 April 1940. He let this unit during the Battle of France, Battle of Britain and the Invasion of Yugoslavia.

== Summary of career ==
=== Aerial victory claims ===
Mathews and Foreman, authors of Luftwaffe Aces — Biographies and Victory Claims, researched the German Federal Archives and state that Rettberg is credited with approximately eight aerial victories. This number includes three claims on the Eastern Front and five on the Western Front.

=== Awards ===
- Flugzeugführerabzeichen
- Front Flying Clasp of the Luftwaffe
- Honour Goblet of the Luftwaffe (Ehrenpokal der Luftwaffe) (28 September 1940)
- Iron Cross (1939) 2nd and 1st Class
- Knight's Cross of the Iron Cross on 14 June 1941 as Hauptmann and Gruppenkommandeur of the II./Zerstörergeschwader 26 "Horst Wessel"
- German Cross in Gold on 7 October 1942 as Major in Zerstörergeschwader 2

Military offices
| Preceded by Major Friedrich Vollbracht | Gruppenkommandeur of II./ZG 26; April 1940 – April 1942 | Succeeded by Hauptmann Eduard Tratt |
| Preceded by Major Ulrich Diesing | Acting Geschwaderkommodore of Zerstörergeschwader 1; 22 September 1942 – 5 October 1942 | Succeeded by Oberstleutnant Paul-Friedrich Darjes |
| Preceded by Major Friedrich Vollbracht | Geschwaderkommodore of Zerstörergeschwader 2 April 1942 – January 1943 | Succeeded by — |
