= Zerstörergeschwader 26 =

German Luftwaffe heavy fighter wing of World War II

Zerstörergeschwader 26 "Horst Wessel"
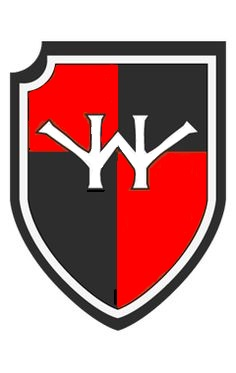
- Crest of ZG 26
- Active: 1 May 1939– September 1944
- Country: Nazi Germany
- Branch: Luftwaffe
- Type: Heavy fighter
- Role: Air superiority Offensive counter air close air support
- Size: Air Force Wing
- Patron: Horst Wessel
- Equipment: Messerschmitt Bf 110; Messerschmitt Me 410
- Engagements: World War II

Commanders
- Notable commanders: Joachim-Friedrich Huth

Insignia
- Identification symbol: Geschwaderkennung of 3U

Zerstörergeschwader 26 (ZG 26) "Horst Wessel" was a Luftwaffe heavy fighter wing of World War II.

Formed on 1 May 1939, ZG 26 was initially armed with the Messerschmitt Bf 109 single-engine interceptor due to production shortfalls with the Messerschmitt Bf 110 Zerstörer-class aircraft. The wing served on the dormant Western Front during the Phoney War stage in 1939 and 1940. During this phase ZG 26 was equipped with the Bf 110. It formed part of Luftflotte 2 and fought in the Battle of the Netherlands, Battle of Belgium and Battle of France in May and June 1940. The wing continued to operate in the Battle of Britain, albeit in a much reduced role owing to losses.

In 1941 ZG 26 served again with success in the German invasion of Yugoslavia and Battle of Greece and then Battle of Crete in April and May. From June 1941, the bulk of ZG 26 fought on the Eastern Front from Operation Barbarossa which began the war on the Soviet Union. ZG 26 supported Army Group Centre and Army Group North. A group of ZG 26 flew and served in the Battle of the Mediterranean and North African Campaign from January 1941 through to May 1943.

From mid-1943, ZG 26 served and fought against the US Eighth Air Force and Fifteenth Air Force in the Defence of the Reich campaign with moderate success until US long-range fighters made further operations too costly. ZG 26 was disbanded in September 1944 and re-designated a Bf 109-unit, Jagdgeschwader 6.

== Formation ==
Zerstörergeschwader 26 was formed in 1939 from the Jagdgeschwader 134 "Horst Wessel". The Geschwaderstab and I. Gruppe was located in Dortmund, II. Gruppe in Werl and III. Gruppe in Lippstadt. ZG 26 was formally named on 1 May 1939, from ZG 142.

== World War II ==
In 1939 the production of Bf 110s precluded the equipment of Zerstörer wings with the type. The heavy fighter was intended as a long-range fighter escort, air superiority and anti-bomber aircraft weapon. The Zerstörergeschwader adopted the Messerschmitt Bf 109D, single-engine interceptor until the Bf 110 became available. The ZG 26's III gruppe was give temporary Jagdgruppe (fighter group) designations. In the case of III./ZG 26 it was renamed JGr 126. This formally ended during the Phoney War when III./ZG 26 exchanged the Bf 109 for the Bf 110 and reverted to its original identity. On 31 August 1939, Stab. I., and II./ZG 26 were under the command of Luftgau XI at Hannover. Luftgau VI, headquartered at Werl, controlled III./ZG 26.

On 1 September 1939 the German Wehrmacht began the Invasion of Poland beginning World War II in Europe. ZG 26, based in northern and western Germany served in the air defence role during the Phoney War phases of the war. The wing defended the German North Sea coast from incursions by RAF Bomber Command. On 29 September 1939, a No. 144 Squadron RAF Handley-Page Hampden was shot down by Günther Specht. Four were claimed by ZG 26 pilots. The future German ace lost an eye on 3 December in combat with a No. 38 Squadron RAF Wellington.

On 6 December ZG 26 incurred one of its first casualties when a Bf 110 from 2./ZG 26 collided with an Avro Anson from No. 209 Squadron RAF 70 miles north of Texel. I./ZG 26 transferred to Stab./ZG 26 from the control of JG 1 on 11 December bring existing groups under the direct control of the command, Stab, staffel (Squadron). On 14 December 1939, 12 Vickers Wellington bombers on an anti-shipping patrol were spotted. Four Bf 110s from 2./ZG 26 at Jever, with support from II./JG 77 Messerschmitt Bf 109s, intercepted and shot down five British bombers. Air Officer Commanding No. 3 Group RAF, Jackie Baldwin, likened the mission to the charge of the light brigade.

Elements of the wing fought at the Battle of the Heligoland Bight, the first named air battle of the war. ZG 26 was unable to intercept. A flight of Bf 110s from ZG 76, led by Hauptmann Wolfgang Falck, claimed four bombers. Falck's fighter was hit and badly damaged. The battle ended daylight sorties by Bomber Command over Germany until late 1944. The defeat forced the British to revise their policy to night bombing, and has been regarded as among the most influential air engagements of the war. Bomber Command's shift to night operations led to calls for the expansion of the night fighter force. ZG 26 donated 10 staffel to the formation of IV(Nacht)/JG 2 in December 1939.

On 15 December 1939, I./ZG 26 was based at Lippstadt, under the command of Fliegerkorps I. III./ZG 26 was subordinated to Luftgau XI and Bönninghardt. Stab. and II./ZG 26 remained at Dortmund and Werl respectively under the command of Fliegerkorps IV. Thereafter, the assignment of Stab./ZG 26 is unknown. The units does not appear on the air corps' order of battle on 10 May. On 10 May 1940 II./ZG 26 had moved to Kaarst-Neuss, under the command of Fliegerkorps I. By 5 June 1940 it had been assigned to Fliegerdivision 9. I./ZG 26 was deleted from I Fliegerkorps' order of battle by the 10 May, and its location is not known. The Stab/ZG 26 had all three Bf 110s operational. I./ZG 26 could field only 11 of the 34 Bf 110s it had, while III./ZG 26 reported 30 of 37 aircraft combat ready. II./ZG 26 reported 25 of 35 Bf 110s operational.

=== Western Europe ===
On 10 May 1940 Fall Gelb, the Wehrmacht's offensive in Western Europe began beginning the Battle of the Netherlands, Battle of Belgium and Battle of France. ZG 26 was ordered to support the invasion of the Netherlands and Army Group B. With support from JG 26, it could not prevent the Dutch Air Force from downing 11 German bombers on the opening day; one of them was the commanding officer of Kampfgeschwader 4, who became a prisoner of war for several days. The Dutch fighters accounted for 21 German aircraft in total, and flew 87 of the 150 sorties logged on the day. In the battles they lost 25 of their own against JG 26 and ZG 26. The Dutch were reduced to 70 aircraft by the following morning but continued to harass the German air operations and claimed a further 13 German aircraft over the next four days. Battles were fought simultaneously over Belgium. The counter-air operations were successful and Joachim-Friedrich Huth's pilots, with support from JG 26, claimed the majority of the 82 Allied aircraft claimed by Luftflotte 2 over the 11–13 May 1940. Belgian aerial resistance was broken on the first day of operations. A total of 83 Belgian machines–mostly trainers were destroyed. The AéMI flew only 146 sorties in the first six days. Between 16 May and 28 May, the AéMI flew just 77 operations.

The long-range Bf 110s were used in the fighter escort role in the afternoon of 11 May. I./ZG 26 sent 15 of its aircraft to escort 30 Dornier Do 17 bombers from III./KG 76 on a bombing raid to Reims. No. 1 Squadron RAF intercepted them and claimed no fewer than nine Bf 110s. Witnesses on the ground claimed they saw six Bf 110s fall, and later ten wrecks were allegedly found on the ground. In reality, I./ZG 26 reported two losses. Two 1./ZG 26 pilots were captured but neither of the gunners survived. I./ZG 26 was known to have engaged No. 73 Squadron RAF near Poilcourt, for one of the Hawker Hurricanes was reported lost in an action involving it. On 14 May 1940, known as the "day of the fighters", I./ZG 26, 2 staffel reported the loss of two aircraft and crews, both of whom were killed. The group formed part of a bomber escort mission against Laon. The formation overflew Berry-au-Bac airfield at 15,000 feet prompting the resident 1 Squadron to scramble and engage. The action cost the British squadron two pilots killed. III./ZG 26 formed part of the escort for an attack on convoys near Namur. No. 73 Squadron RAF lost one pilot attacking the Bf 110s, while the group engaged Amiot 143 bombers from GB 1/34 or GB II/34 (Groupe de Bombardement ) and accounted for one destroyed. All the remaining bombers were damaged beyond repair. II./ZG 26 supported the defence of the captured bridges at Sedan. Along with III./JG 2, I./JG 53, they shot down seven bombers from 28 sent by 2 Group RAF, and drawn from 21, 107 and 110 Squadrons. ZG 26 is credited with four of the Hurricanes lost that day according to RAF Advanced Air Striking Force casualty lists; three against 1 Squadron and another against 73 Squadron.

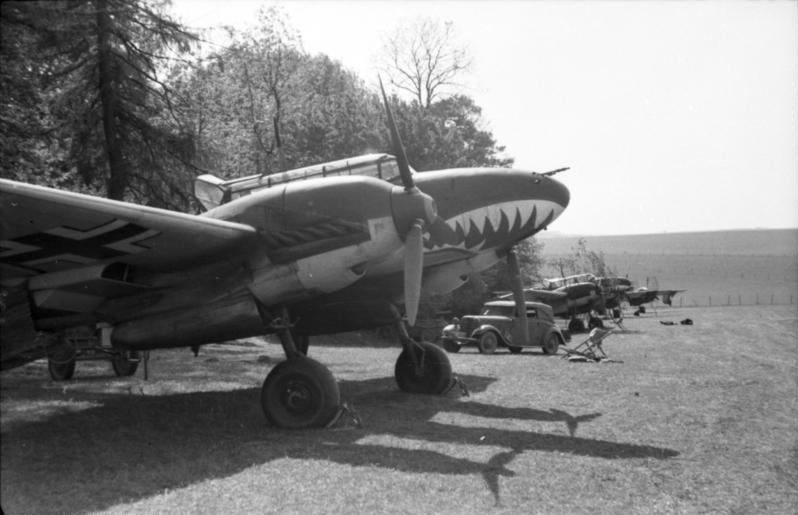
Bf 110s during the Western campaign, 1940. They probably belong to Zerstörergeschwader 76.

On 15 May ZG 26 and 73 Squadron met in combat again. III./ZG 26 escorted 40 DO 17s of I. and II./KG 3 on a mission over Allied air bases. 73 Squadron intercepted and in the ensuing dogfights, the RAF pilots claimed four Bf 110s for the loss of two Hurricanes. The German pilots filed claims for nine "Moranes" [mistakenly identifying the Hurricanes as French fighters] for the loss of two Bf 110s destroyed and two badly damaged in crash-landings, confirming British claims. Only two Hurricanes were shot down with both pilots surviving. One of the German losses came from 7./ZG 26, one from 8./ZG 26, and two from 9./ZG 26. 5./ZG 26 intercepted a Westland Lysander, 13 Squadron, escorted by Hurricanes from No. 85 Squadron RAF. The German fighters succeeded in attacking from above and shot down three Hurricanes seriously burning one pilot. 5./ZG 26 was left with only three serviceable Bf 110s.

85 Squadron encountered ZG 26 three days later, when six of their Hurricanes, including a section [A Flight] from No. 242 Squadron RAF, and three more from No. 87 Squadron RAF patrolled the Le Cateau quadrant. All three Canadian pilots from 242 A flight and two 85 Squadron pilots were shot down. The battle cost I./ZG 26 three aircraft; one from 2./ZG 26 and two from 3./ZG 26. 85 Squadron suffered one pilot killed, another wounded. One of the Canadians was captured, the others wounded. Later in the day, between Douai and Valenciennes, A flight from No. 111 Squadron RAF and B Flight from No. 253 Squadron RAF encountered nine Bf 110s from I./ZG 26, escorting Heinkel He 111s belonging to I. and II./KG 54, and II./ZG 26, escorting Do 17s from II./KG 76. The Hurricanes shot down one and damaged one of the Dorniers, all from 4./KG 76 while 1./ZG 26 lost one Bf 110 and two others severely damaged protecting them. Two 5./ZG 26 Messerschmitts escorting a Do 17P reconnaissance aircraft failed to protect it from an attack by No. 17 Squadron RAF. The British claimed one of the Bf 110s and reported the other fled upon seeing them. In the afternoon I./ZG 26 and II./JG 26 strafed Vitry airfield as No. 56 Squadron RAF took off to intercept I./KG 54 which bombed the Amiens – Glisy Aerodrome, the main supply base for replacement Hurricanes for the RAF in France. The Bf 110s shot down two killing both pilots including 18-year old Pilot Officer Dillon. One of the group was caught and shot down by No. 3 Squadron RAF Hurricane pilots claimed 32 Bf 110s on this date but only 16 were reported destroyed by the Germans.

On 19 May large air battles occurred over Lille as encircled Allied forces held out. ZG 26 continued in the escort role as the German army reached the English Channel the following morning, cutting off British, Belgian and French forces from the rest of France. A composite force of 111 and 253 Squadron left RAF Hawkinge to patrol Cambrai. After encountering an unidentified Do 17 formation they ran into II./ZG 26 Bf 110s escorting 60 kg 54 He 111 bombers. I. and II./JG 3 were present as the dogfight started. Five Hurricanes were shot down in the fight with Bf 110s and Bf 109s and one damaged by the bombers. It is believed four fell to Bf 109s and three pilots killed. A single 111 Squadron was credited to ZG 26; 111's Squadron Leader John Marlow Thompson survived. Later in the day, KG 54 were operating in the Cambrai sector again covered by I./JG 27 and I./ZG 26. A composite force of 145 and 601 Squadrons intercepted. The latter lost one Hurricane to each German wing and a further damaged by ZG 26. III./ZG 26 flew as fighter escort for KG 3 as it operated against rail and road traffic west of the Seine and Aisne.

On 20 May, the Panzer Divisions of Army Group A reached the Channel. I./ZG 26 was in action against 87 Squadron while escorting Junkers Ju 88s. The British claimed one Bf 110 and another damaged. II./ZG 26 fought to protect Ju 88s from III./LG 1 over Norrent-Fontes against No. 615 Squadron RAF. Hurricane pilots claimed seven Bf 110s on this date. German forces reported the loss of one. Two Ju 88s were lost on 20 May, though British pilots claimed six. 85 Squadron and 615 reported the loss of one Hurricane each in force-landings after combat with I./ZG 26 indicating other engagements on the day. From 21 May, Amiens fell, and Boulogne was threatened. 4 and 13 Squadron remained flying army-cooperation flights between Lille and Saint-Omer. The squadrons lost five between them; I./ZG 26 were responsible for one. ZG 26 operated over the Pas-de-Calais through the day as the British counter-attacked at Arras. On 23 May, a group of the ZG 26 reported only 19 of the 26 Bf 110s operational. During the Battle of Calais, on 24 May, ZG 26, with ZG 76, encountered the Supermarine Spitfire for the first time. No. 92 Squadron RAF lost two Spitfires, while the ZG's reported two losses between them.

From 25 May 1940 ZG 26 was reassigned from Jagdfliegerführer 2 to Fliegerkorps V to provide KG 51 with support. ZG 26 remained in action during the Dunkirk evacuation, and the final phase of the French campaign, Fall Rot. Over 31 May, ZG 26 claimed five Spitfires over Dunkirk. Two Hurricanes were known to have been shot down in combat with Bf 110s. Both No. 229 Squadron RAF pilots survived. A Spitfire from No. 64 Squadron RAF was reported lost in combat with Bf 110s. Its pilot was captured but later died of wounds. On 5 June Stab./ZG 26 was based at Sint-Truiden, I./ZG 26 at Yvrench/Saint Omer, II./ZG 26 at Lille and III./ZG 26 at Arques, Pas-de-Calais. ZG 26 was subordinated to Fliegerkorps I in June and flew in support of German air operations against Operation Aerial. By the end of the French campaign following the Armistice of 22 June 1940, the Zerstörergeschwader 1, 2, 26, 52 and 76 had suffered a combined loss of 32 percent—the worst percentage loss by any German wing type.

=== Battle of Britain ===
In July 1940, the Churchill Government rejected Adolf Hitler's offers of a peace settlement. Hitler authorised the planning for Operation Sea Lion, a proposed amphibious landing in the United Kingdom. The Luftwaffe began an air campaign against Channel convoys, beginning the first phase of what became known as the Battle of Britain. The Kanalkampf was designed to draw out RAF Fighter Command and achieve air superiority by defeating it in battle, and by bombing airfields and known supporting facilities; radar stations and factories.

ZG 26 was based at multiple locations in northern France. Huth and the Stab./ZG 26 was based at Lille. I./ZG 26, under Hauptmann Wilhelm Macrocki located to Yvrench. II./ZG 26 under the command of Ralph von Rettberg based itself at Crécy-en-Ponthieu while III./ZG 26 based at Barley under Hauptmann Johann Schalk. The wing was returned to Jagdfliegerführer 2, under the command of Luftflotte 2. On 9 July 1940, one day before the officially recognised start of the Battle of Britain, III./ZG 26 were ordered to cover raids against convoys. The vulnerability of Bf 110s to nimble Hurricane and Spitfires necessitated their own protection by Bf 109s. Their charges, He 111s from I./KG 53 and Ju 88s, probably from I. and II./KG 51, lost only aircraft; a He 111. In defending the bombers, the gruppe lost three Bf 110s and another damaged, losing seven airmen as missing in action. Only one pilot survived. The air battle occurred over the Thames Estuary and Folkestone. ZG 26's opponents were from No. 43 Squadron RAF, and No. 151 Squadron RAF. Two No. 43 Squadron Hurricanes were destroyed with the pilots safe, and 151 lost one destroyed in combat and one damaged; one pilot was wounded. The identity of the German fighter unit responsible for each is unknown, but the four were reported shot down. Squadron Leader, No. 43 Squadron, G. C. Lott was wounded in the eyes. The following day, 10 July, the battle opened with heavy air attacks against Convoy Bread. I. and III./ZG 26 and I./JG 3 Bf 109s escorted 26 Do 17s from I./KG 2. No. 74 Squadron RAF engaged and the wing lost one crew and another aircraft damaged. 74 Squadron suffered damage to three Spitfires, while KG 2 lost two bombers and one severely damaged in combat with 111 and No. 32 Squadron RAF.

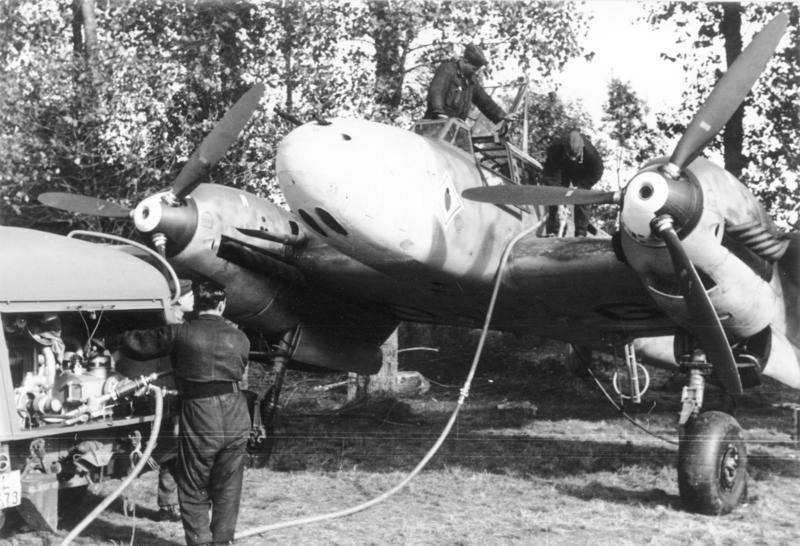
Fueling a Bf 110 of ZG 26, October 1940

On 29 July, Eight Bf 110s from 1. Staffel and three from 2. Staffel/Schnellkampfgeschwader 210 were met near Dunkirk by 30 Bf 110 escorts from ZG 26. The formation set out for the convoys. They were intercepted and attacked by No. 151 Squadron Hurricanes. Two Hurricanes force-landed, the pilots unharmed, an Erpro 210 Bf 110 was damaged and ZG 26 suffered no losses, the attackers claiming hits on a 1,000 GRT and an 8,000 GRT ship. The last actions of the Kanalkampf were fought on 11 August, with a final German attack on convoys Booty, Agent and Arena. Walter Rubensdörffer led ErpGr 210 off the Harwich–Clacton coast at noon GMT. The Germans spotted the ships and began their bombing run against Booty. Rubensdörffer and his Zerstörer were accompanied by eight Do 17s from the specialist 9./KG 2, whose crews were trained for low-level attacks. Twenty Bf 110s from ZG 26 provided high cover for the bombers. The fighters were intercepted by Spitfires from 74 and 85 squadrons while six Hurricanes from No. 17 Squadron attacked. No. 85 Squadron led by Peter Townsend shot down three Bf 110s and the Hurricanes one more; two Bf 110s and three Do 17s were damaged. Rubensdörffer's group attacked and withdrew. It was followed by another raid, designed to catch those fighters already in combat when they were low on fuel and unable to assist. ZG 26 destroyed one Hurricane and damaged another from 17 Squadron killing one pilot. Two pilots from No. 74 Squadron were shot down and killed.

On 13 August the Luftwaffe initiated Operation Eagle Attack—Adlertag. The morning weather was bad and Hermann Göring ordered a postponement of raids. KG 2 were not informed and took off at 04:50 for their target. ZG 26 were scheduled as their escort, but received the cancellation order. Oberstleutnant Huth took off to warn the Dorniers of the cancellation. Unable to contact the bombers by radio, Huth tried to signal them by flying in front of them and performing aerobatics. Commander of the bomber force, Johannes Fink, ignored him and flew on. The raid was detected but incorrectly plotted causing Fighter Command to miss the unprotected Dorniers. On the 15 August (known as "black Thursday" in the Luftwaffe), ZG 26 did not suffer losses, but the following day the wing reported two losses, one destroyed one damaged, in combat with Spitfires from No. 19 Squadron RAF over Harwich. The damaged fighter belonged to the Stab./ZG 26. The burden of the Zerstörergeschwader 15 August operations fell to ZG 76, which suffered heavy casualties operating from bases in Norway.

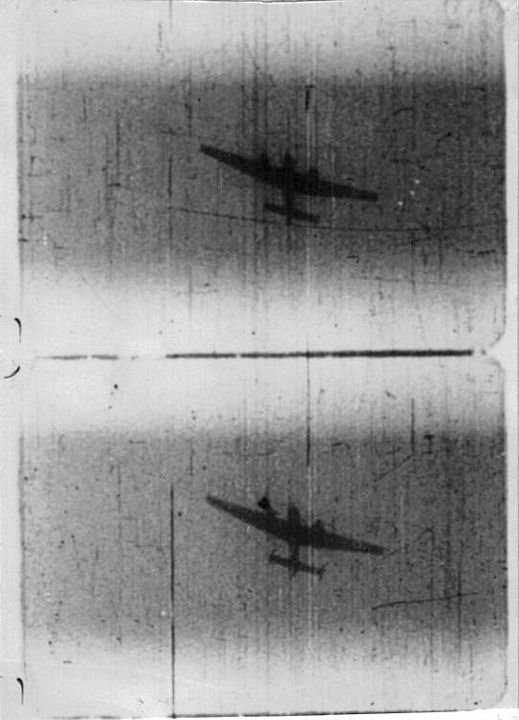
Messerschmitt Bf 110 under attack from a Spitfire, caught on the latter's gun camera

On 18 August, a date known as The Hardest Day, ZG 26 performed in the combat air patrol role. RAF Biggin Hill and RAF Kenley. KG 1 was to send 60 He 111s to conduct a high-level attack on Biggin Hill. kg 76 was to attack RAF Kenley. kg 76 could muster 48 Do 17s and Ju 88s. Fighter escort was provided by JG 3, JG 26, JG 51, JG 52, JG 54 and ZG 26. The Jagdgeschwader would carry out free-hunting and close escort. ZG 26 and JG 3 were engaged by No. 610, No. 615 and No. 32 Squadrons. No. 615 suffered heavy losses in the battle. ZG 26 were responsible for 12 of the 15 fighters shot down in the battle; nine of which were destroyed. 7./ZG 26 claimed its 30th victory of the war, having suffered only one loss since 1939. The German High Command credited ZG 26 were credited with 51 victories, of the 124 granted to the German fighter units by their command. A maximum of 34 RAF fighters were lost in reality to all causes. ZG 26 reported losses on the day. They were engaged by other fighter squadrons. 56 Squadron was one such unit. In the short and sharp engagement, ZG 26 lost five Bf 110s and another damaged to 56 Squadron. Worse was to follow when No. 54 and No. 501 engaged the Messerschmitts. ZG 26 lost a further two shot down and two damaged to No. 54 Squadron. None of the RAF Squadrons reported any losses in these engagements. ZG 26 lost other machines to No. 151 and 46 Squadrons when they arrived to join the battle.

In the afternoon ZG 26 provided escort for KG 53 bombers bombing RAF North Weald. 13 Hurricanes from 85 Squadron, led by Peter Townsend, struck at the bombers but was blocked by ZG 26. Bf 109s were also present and inconclusive engagements began. No. 85 Squadron accounted for one He 111, but lost a Hurricane to the Bf 110s. KG 53 lost four He 111s destroyed and one damaged. Its personnel losses amounted to 12 dead, two wounded and four prisoners of war. A further five were rescued by British ships, bringing the total number captured to nine. No. 151 Squadron engaged III./ZG 26 but two of the Hurricanes were brought down, including Squadron Leader Eric King directly above the airfield. The low losses of the group in the face of fighter attacks were down to the determination of ZG 26. It cost the unit seven Bf 110s and a further six damaged. According to one source, the total losses of ZG 26 amounted to 12 destroyed and seven damaged throughout the entire day. Another source gives a list of 15 Bf 110s written off: 13 destroyed, two written off and six damaged on 18 August 1940.

The results of the Hardest Day highlighted the vulnerability of Bf 110, which along with the Junkers Ju 87 Stuka, was largely withdrawn from the battle for air superiority for a time The German High Command ordered that the continued use of the Bf 110 necessitated their escort by Bf 109s. On 25 August, in a rare post-18 August foray, ZG 2 made an appearance over England but suffered significant losses. On 6 September ZG 26 was ordered to attack the Brooklands Hawker factory but lost three Bf 110s and their crews when intercepted by 1 Squadron near Kenley. On 11 September, as the Luftwaffe turned to The Blitz, ZG 26 was ordered to provide escort to He 111s from KG 26. The Bf 110s failed to protect their charges, losing five Bf 110s and one damaged from Stab., 1., 2., 4., 6., and 9./ZG 26. Their assailants were from 17, 46 and 73 Squadron. The persistence in using ZG 26 in fighter sweeps cost the wing another two crews on 25 September with two aircraft damaged in combat with 152 and No. 607 Squadron RAF near the Isle of Wight. The following day 70 Bf 110s from ZG 26 flew as escort for KG 55 as it bombed the Spitfire factory at Southampton. Two fighters were lost (from I. and III./ZG 26) in combat with No. 238 Squadron; one of their charges was shot down. On 28 and 29 September ZG 26 flew patrols over Hampshire with support from 60 Bf 109s from JG 2 and JG 53. On 27 September, 30 ZG 26 crews from III./ZG 26 covered KG 55 bombers as they targeted the Bristol factory. Six aircraft were shot down and one damaged in combat with No. 56 and No. 152 Squadrons. Three of the lost machines were from III./ZG 26 and two from II./ZG 26. On 30 September II./ZG 26 flew a combat patrol from Cherbourg to Weymouth, Dorset and shot down five Hurricanes from No. 56 Squadron near Warmwell and damaged two more for the loss of one Bf 110. All six pilots survived.

In October 1940, ZG 26 flew low-level attacks on towns in southern England. On 7 October II. and II./ZG 26 mounted an attack on Yeovil. ZG 26 lost seven aircraft, three from II./ZG 26 and four from III./ZG 26. The losses were inflicted by No. 238 and No. 601 Squadrons and other "Yeovil" defences. One 601 Spitfire was damaged and landed. The Battle of Britain came to an end on 31 October 1940, and Sea Lion was postponed indefinitely.

=== Eastern Mediterranean and Balkans ===
ZG 26 relocated to southeast Europe in 1941. III./ZG 26 supported the German invasion of Yugoslavia from 6 April 1941. II./ZG 26 was based at Vrazhdebna, Bulgaria under the command of Fliegerkorps VIII. I./ZG 26 located to Szeged, Hungary under the ad hoc Fliegerführer Arad, under the command of Luftflotte 4. III./ZG 26 had been operating from Sicily, over the besieged island of Malta.

III./ZG 26 carried out strafing attack on Podgorica airfield, destroying two bombers and damaging three belonging to the 81 Independent Grupa at Mostar-Ortijes. The 66 Grupa led by 4 Bombarderska, Colonel Petar Vukcevic, Royal Yugoslav Air Force and 7th Puk bombers were also operating from airfields in the vicinity. Fliegerkorps VIII claimed 60 aircraft on 6 April. II./ZG 26 reported one loss over Skopje. I./ZG 26 supported Operation Retribution, the bombing of Belgrade, and claimed two Yugoslav-flown Bf 109s. In combat with the 6th Puk fighter unit, the group lost five Bf 110s; Yugoslav also accounted for two Do 17s from 8./KG 3.

II./ZG 26 joined Bf 109s from I(J)/LG 2 in battle against the 111 and 112 Eskadrila Hawker Fury fighters led by Captains Vojislav Popovik and Konstantin Jermakov. Jermokov was seen to ram a Bf 110 after exhausting his ammunition. II/ZG 26 lost two crews; the Yugoslavs claimed to have found the body of a Bulgarian Army officer in one of the Bf 110 wrecks. Presumably the officer was assisting the Germans with navigation. German pilots claimed 11 between them. Yugoslav losses are not stated but the 36 Grupa, to which the squadrons belonged, had only two flyable Furies remained air worthy.

Following the swift collapse of the Yugoslav Army, ZG 26 and all its gruppen moved to support the German forces in the Battle of Greece in the fighter and fighter-bomber role. The RAF had sustained heavy losses in the campaign to 20 April. This day was to be its worst. British aerial resistance prompted the Luftwaffe to initiate a sustained attack on airfields in the Athens area. Elements of II./ZG 26 struck at the airfield Menidi, Aetolia-Acarnania airfield on 20 April, a Greek transport, a British courier aircraft and possibly 12 Blenheim bombers from 84, 11 and 211 according to an eyewitness. Records confirm two each destroyed among 11 and 211, while 84 Squadron suffered serious damage to one and another five were damaged.

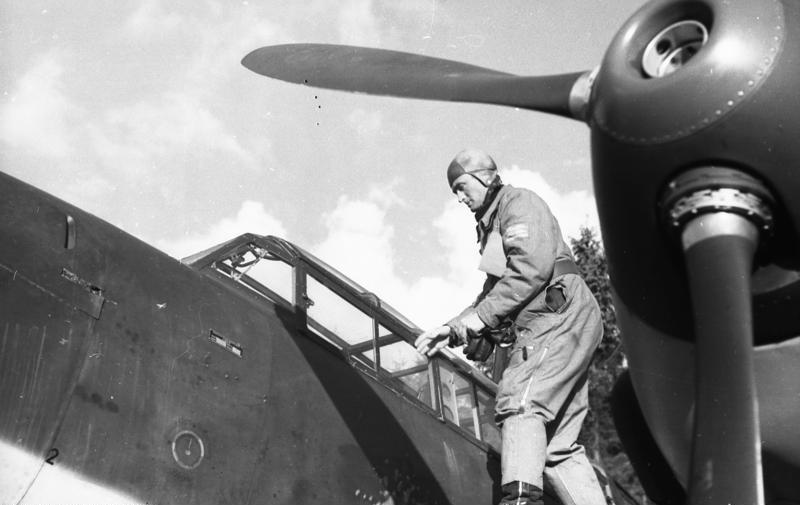
Theodor Rossiwall, ZG 26, 1940. He took part in the "Battle of Athens" in which Pat Pattle was killed.

I./ZG 26 attacked the Hellenic Air Force base Argos, located on the Peloponnesus peninsula to the west of Athens. 40 aircraft of I./ZG 26 commanded and led by Major Mackroki worked over its facilities for upwards of an hour. The action took place on 23 April. The Bf 110s destroyed 13 Hurricanes and trainers from No. 208 Squadron RAF. The Germans claimed 53 in total; almost all the Greek aircraft present were destroyed. Only two RAF Hurricanes remained, plus five that took off as the German raid approached. II./ZG 26 strafed Menidi airfield claiming two aircraft, Hassani and then Megara airstrip claiming four and six destroyed respectively. Amongst those destroyed were six Dornier Do 22s of the Greek 2 Mira. Operations cost the gruppe one aircraft.

ZG 26 supported the rapid advance of ground forces to Athens, where, on 20 April, ZG 26 took part in what has been called the "Battle of Athens". Two of the wing's pilots may have shot down the most successful British Commonwealth pilot of the war, Pat Pattle who was killed. II./ZG 26 formed part of an escort force, with Bf 109s from III./JG 77, for approximately 100 Do 17s, and Ju 88s from LG 1. The bombers attacked shipping while ZG 26 loitered strafing targets. In combat with Pattle's squadron, they claimed five. Four Hurricanes were known to have been shot down in combat with Bf 110s. The Hurricane squadron also claimed five Bf 110s but lost two pilots killed. Among the few RAF survivors of the battle still airborne at its end was Pilot Officer Roald Dahl, the future poet and novelist. On 14 May, during te build-up for the Crete landings, I and II/ZG 26 were surprised on their Argos airfield by No. 252 Squadron RAF. The Messerschmitts were lined up wingtip to wingtip and 13 were hit; three destroyed and one damaged.

On 22 May 1941 the final phase of the Greek campaign, the Battle of Crete, began. ZG 26 flew bombing and strafing missions in support of the invasion. Suda Bay and Heraklion airfield were particular targets. On 22 May II./ZG 26 lost two aircraft against these targets and supporting Fallschirmjäger forces. The following day II./ZG 26 assisted 5./JG 77 in attack the British 10th MTB Flotilla which was taking a toll on Axis naval forces. Seven of these Motor Torpedo Boats were destroyed. On 28 May this group, with II/ZG 76, and KG 2, bombed and strafed British positions at Heraklion airfield allowing 900 paratroopers to reinforce the hard-pressed German paratroopers that had survived the disastrous first landing. Among the final actions of the battle, was death of 2./ZG 26 commanding officer Hauptmann Karl Heindorf, who was shot down over Crete on 31 May.

=== North Africa; Libya and Egypt ===
In response to the failed Italian invasion of Egypt, Hitler aided Benito Mussolini to prevent a collapse of the Axis powers in the North African Campaign. Operation Compass in 1941 drove out the Italian 10th Army and threatened to destroy Italian forces in Italian Libya. Among the Luftwaffe contingent rushed to Africa was III./ZG 26 along with a single staffel from I./ZG 26, 2./ZG 26. They arrived at airstrips near Castel Benito, Sirte and Marble Arch on 30 January 1941. All of these units came under the command of Gruppenkommandeur Karl Kaschka and his adjutant, Oberleutnant Fritze Schulze-Dickow, who led 8./ZG 26. The group consisted of 7, 8 and 9 staffel. ZG 26 was tasked with supporting elements of StG 1, StG 2 and StG 3 and their Junkers Ju 87 Stuka dive-bombers. On 10 February 1941, ZG 26's opponents in Africa amounted to two squadrons; No. 73 Squadron RAF and No. 3 Squadron RAAF. Two days later Erwin Rommel, commander of the German Africa Corps arrived in Tripoli followed by elements of what became the 21st Panzer Division on 14 February. On this date, ZG 26 suffered the first loss in Africa when III Gruppe Bf 110 was shot down and its pilot Unteroffizier Lippski and his gunner captured. A further loss occurred on 15 February, but III./ZG 26 claimed its first success in combat with 3 RAAF on 19 February. The German unit shielded II./StG 2, and at the cost of one Bf 110 and a Ju 87, destroyed two Hurricanes, killing one pilot. With Operation Sonnenblume in the full-swing, III./ZG 26 suffered two casualties on 23 February as Axis forces recaptured Cyrenaica.

7./ZG 26 lost one Bf 110 during the battle of Marsa Brega to 3 RAAF. On 3 April, the 2nd Armoured Division retreated from Antelat, deserting No. 6 Squadron RAF which had arrived in that area. The advance caught the squadron off guard and they retreated to Msus. During the day, 6 squadron ran into a formation of II./StG 2 Ju 87s and eight Bf 110s from III./ZG 26. They claimed three certain and three probable victories against the Ju 87s; only one Ju 87 pilot was killed, and four of the Bf 110s. No German losses are stated, and ZG 26's claims of three Hurricanes cannot be confirmed for 6 Squadron's records were destroyed in the retreat. On 5 April six Bf 110s from ZG 26 strafed an airfield hitting five Bristol Blenheims, a Hurricane and a Lysander. Two of the Blenheim's and the Lysander were unflyable and burned during the retreat.

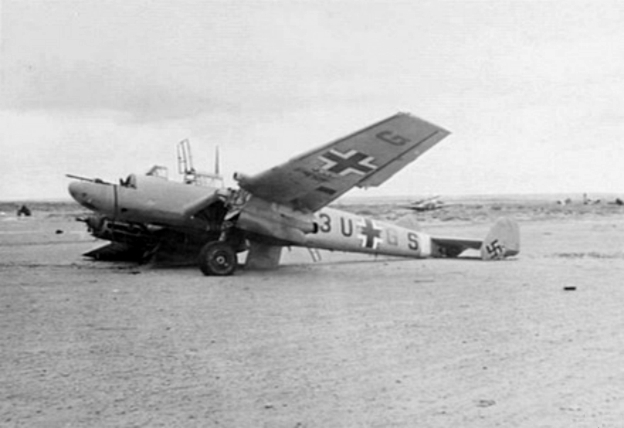
A wrecked Bf 110D from ZG 26, Gazala, December 1941

In early April the frontline consolidated. The 7th Australian Division was landed at Tobruk on 7th and on the 8th the Axis landed the 15th Panzer Division to sustain the drive across Libya and into Egypt. The Allied forces dug in around the port, beginning the Siege of Tobruk. 6 and 73 Squadrons were left in the perimeter of Tobruk, while other Commonwealth units retreated into Egypt. British bomber forces continued long-range support operations; No. 55 Squadron RAF lost a bomber to III./ZG 26 in the process on 8 April. ZG 26 lost two more aircraft and one pilot filled the following day for a single claim, in action with 73 squadron, while a 6 Squadron Hurricane was claimed on 11 April. On 14 April, 70 German aircraft along with support from 18 and 155 Gruppo, Regia Aeronautica, attacked Tobruk. 73 squadron lost one pilot killed against III./ZG 26, but three III./StG 1 crews were shot down and captured. A further attack triggered a battle with 3 RAAF; German records confirm the loss of one ZG 26 crew. ZG 26 were able to account for a No. 45 Squadron RAF Blenheim before Bf 109s from I./JG 27 arrived to carry the burden of fighter operations. On 25 April, III./ZG 26 reported the destruction of one Hurricane but lost Leutnant Oskar Lemcke when he collided with it. No. 274 Squadron RAF lost two pilots missing. In strafing attacks against Tobruk, ZG 26 lost another crew and a further pilot wounded on 1 May. III./ZG 26 supported the defeat of Operation Battleaxe in June 1941, though its pilots claimed a solitary aircraft shot down; on 17 June. The remainder fell to JG 27's Bf 109s.

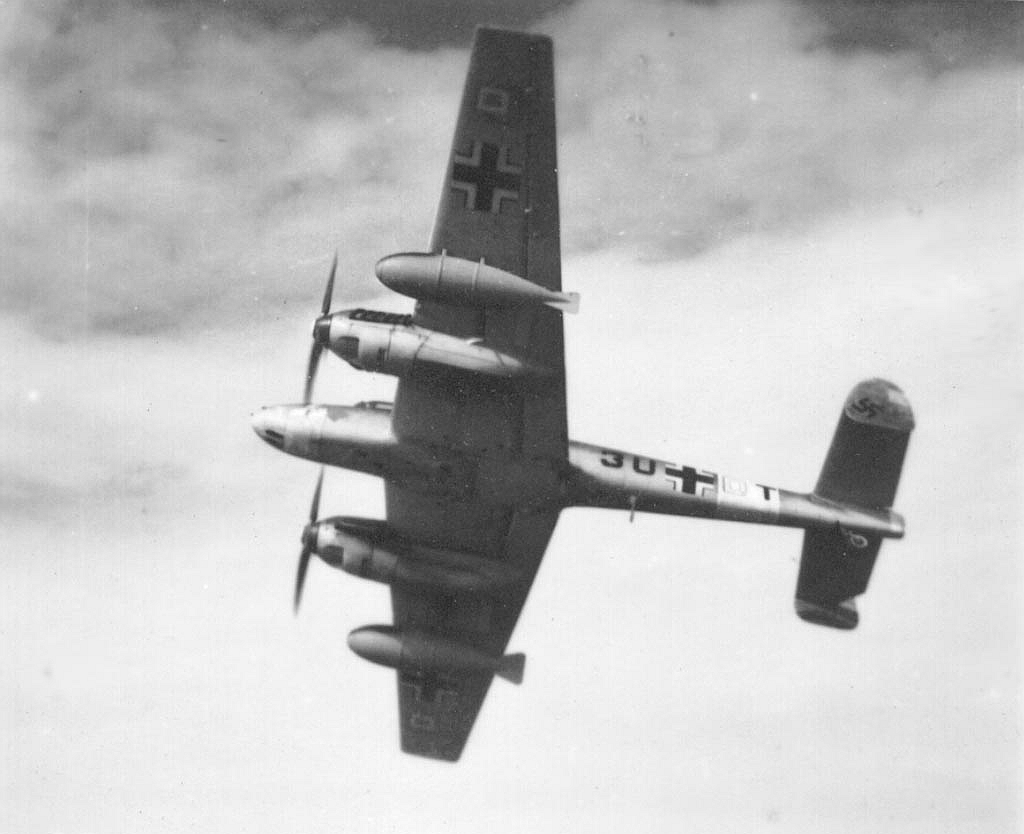
Bf 110 carrying twin 900 litre drop tanks with vertical fins, 9 staffel III./ZG 26

On 30 June, while escorting 20 Ju 87s, with 12 Italian fighters and 10 Bf 109s, five ZG 26 Bf 110s were engaged by No. 250 Squadron RAF and two crews were killed. On 11 or 12 another crew was lost in combat with 1 Squadron SAAF. On 21 August 1941, ZG 26 claimed four 2 Squadron SAAF Hurricanes that were seen to crash; Schultz-Dickow claiming the formation leader, in exchange for one crew killed. On 3 September, near Sollum, two Hurricanes from No. 451 Squadron RAF were intercepted by three III./ZG 26 Bf 110s and lost one pilot. III./ZG 26 had now claimed 33 aerial victories since their arrival in Africa. Large air battles took place in the build-up to Operation Crusader, which ultimately relieved Tobruk. On 15 November three III./ZG 26 aircraft were shot down over Allied territory attack airfields. One them was commanding officer Schultze-Dickow. Another Bf 110 piloted by Oberfeldwebel Swoboda landed in the desert to pick him up. During the month the group replenished its establishment and had three staffeln (7, 8 and 9) operating from Derna, Libya at the beginning of Crusader, the latter staffeln returning from Crete.

On 20 November two crews were wounded and three Bf 110s were shot down in combat on 24 November resulting in the capture of two pilots, one from 8 and 9./ZG 26. The latter combat took place against 4 Squadron SAAF and No. 80 Squadron RAF. The following day four Bf 110s and their crews were lost in what was described as a "bad day for the Bf 110s of III./ZG 26." On 4 December, over the Trigh Capuzzo, Sergeant Dodd, 274 Squadron shot down a Bf 110 piloted by Major Karl Kaschka. Oberleutnant Wehmeyer landed alongside the wreck to find the gunner dead and Kaschka dying. On 12 December the group shot down two 12 Squadron SAAF Martin Maryland bombers and a 55 Squadron Blenheim over the sea. However, on 24 December, Kaschka's replacement at III./ZG 26, Hauptmann Thomas Steinberger was lost at sea with another 9./ZG 26 crew on a ferry flight from Crete.

By 31 December 1941, III./ZG 26 had flown 2,962 sorties in North Africa. 483 of these were close air support. They had lost 11 killed, six in accidents, 27 missing, nine captured and 16 wounded. By 16 January 1942, only 7./ZG 26 remained on the frontline in Africa. It possessed eight aircraft, but only four were operational. Twelve days later, on 26 January another crew was lost; one was captured the others died of wounds. On 13 April, in an unusual episode, Bf 110s of 7./ZG 26 landed at an abandoned British airfield [name unspecified] and destroyed the installations after climbing out of their aircraft. Further details in updated sources indicate six 7./ZG 26 Bf 110s escorted Italian Savoia-Marchetti SM.82s to the airfield. While three Bf 110s flew cover, 60 Italian personnel landed and destroyed abandoned fuel and lubrication tanks in an operation lasting until 10:00. ZG 26 engaged in maritime and air escort sorties. On one such operation it lost one of three 7./ZG 26 Bf 110s escorting Junkers Ju 52 transports. They were unable to prevent nine Ju 52s from being shot down by Allied fighters on 12 May. KGrzbV 400 and III./KGrzbV 1 lost four each, KGrzbV1 lost a single transport.

The wing operated in the close air support role in May 1942, losing one on 2nd and 12th, then operating in support of the Battle of Gazala. On 27 May the group claimed two Hurricanes for one crew lost and captured; though their opponents were probably P-40s from 5 Squadron SAAF. ZG 26 lost a further crew killed and another aircraft severely damaged by the end of the day. During April and May 1942, III./ZG 26 began night fighter flights over the desert, claiming one bomber on 29 May 1942 when assisted by search lights. The loss is confirmed through Allied records and likely belonged to 24 Squadron SAAF. On 1 June 1942, 7./ZG 26 attacked motorised vehicles with support from 9./ZG 26. Two of the latter unit lost two Bf 110s while the former lost one crew when a tank it was attacking exploded in front of them. All six men were killed.

=== Defeat in Africa: From Egypt to Tunisia ===
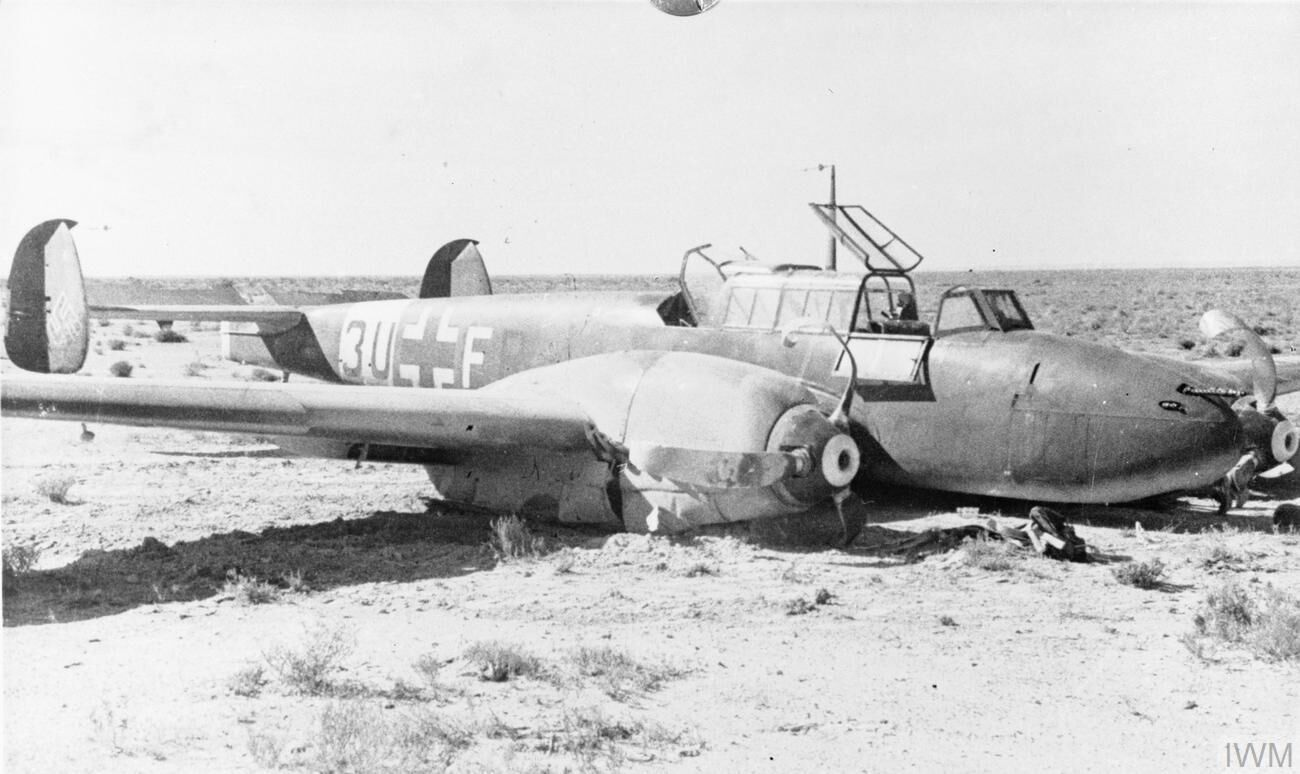
Bf 110, III./ZG 26 crash-landed near Tobruk, 1941

III./ZG 26's activities from the beginning to end of the Second Battle of El Alamein appear to have been non-notable, for the unit does not appear to have filed any claims in combat or reported any losses. Only one aircraft was abandoned at Berka airfield as the Axis forces retreated from Egypt. III./ZG 26 had been returned to Germany for rest and replenishment. It returned to Africa upon Operation Torch, the Anglo-American landings in Morocco and Algeria. The group was equipped with Bf 110Cs still, and a small number of Ju 88Cs and Do 17Zs. III./ZG 1 followed with the new Messerschmitt Me 210. On 14 November 1942 the group was providing fighter escort to Ju 52 transports from Sicily to Tunis. No. 126 Squadron RAF patrolling from Malta encountered one such formation and a dogfight saw one fighter from each side shot down. Staffeln were also based at Gabes airfield on 29 November, for Lockheed P-38 Lightnings from the 1st Fighter Group based at Youks-les-Bains Airfield, strafed the airfield. The US pilots claimed two Bf 110s in aerial combat—the other being claimed by the 14th Fighter Group. The Run for Tunis prolonged the African campaign. The Allied powers established considerable air power in Algeria and Tunisia by early December 1942. III./ZG 26 began to operate from Sicilian airfields with greater frequency. The Bf 110s were used mainly in the long-range escort role for air transports between Greece, Crete, Sicily and Africa rather than the air superiority role. These operations were carried out at low altitudes. The threat of long-range heavy fighters such as the Bristol Beaufighter was evident on 4/5 December when No. 227 Squadron RAF claimed two transports carrying invaluable ground personnel were shot down over the Strait of Sicily; one belonging to III./ZG 26. The group lost all three Bf 110s escorting 32 Ju 52s on 11 December 1942. Beaufighters from No. 272 Squadron RAF and Spitfires from No. 249 Squadron RAF intercepted. Eight of the transports were claimed and more damaged. The only group success was the shooting down of a Martin Baltimore, No. 69 Squadron RAF. On 22 January 1943 another patrol protecting a convoy engaged B-26 Marauders from the 416th Bombardment Group with JG 53—the latter succeeded in downing two, confirmed by US losses, but the results of ZG 26's involvement are unclear. In action with P-38s of the 82nd Fighter Group and B-26s of the 319th Bombardment Group, ZG 26 lost two crews who intervened to protect freighters and two He 111s that came under attack on 31 January 1943.

ZG 26 continued over-water operations claiming a P-38 on 1 February, losing three crews and one damaged to the US 82nd Fighter Group protecting two tankers from 319th Bomb Group on 3rd. By 28 February 1943, Trapani in Sicily was III./ZG 26's base under the command of Hauptmann Vögel. Amongst the few successes was the action 17 March 1943, when the pilots claimed four or five Bristol Beauforts from No. 272 Squadron RAF. The action involved III./ZG 1 and their Me 210s. Successes for Zerstörer pilots were few in the Mediterranean at this stage. Feldwebel Günther Wegmann was among the few exceptions—a picture showing eight claims on his rudder exists; though the port vertical stabiliser shows visible signs of combat damage via four 20mm cannon shells and a single .303 holes. Wegmann claimed 14 aircraft flying the Bf 110 and Me 410 and became one of the few German jet aces. It is known that the unit remained in Africa until the late stages of the Battle of Tunisia, for a group machine was reported destroyed at Sfax airfield on 30 March 1943. In early April 1943, Operation Flax began, which cut off the air-bridge from Sicily to Tunis. Two crews were shot down on the operation's first day. In combat with 82nd Fighter Group, 95th Squadron P-38s, III./ZG 26 defended Ju 52 transports yet again, losing two. They claimed seven P-38s, but only three US fighters were lost. 15 Ju 52s were claimed by American pilots. The 96th Squadron spotted and engaged the Germans claiming another four but losing one pilot to III./ZG 26. On 16 April III./ZG 26 claimed five B-17 Flying Fortress bombs from the 97th Bombardment Group and possibly another from the 301st Bombardment Group—four were brought down—during an attack on Palermo.

On 13 May 1943 Panzer Army Africa surrendered ending the Tunisian Campaign and the fighting in North Africa. At this time, 965 Allied aircraft had been claimed shot down by the Luftwaffe over Africa between November 1942 and May 1943. III./ZG 26 accounted for "at least 17" of these.

=== Invasion of the Soviet Union ===
III./ZG 26 remained in North Africa in June 1941. Stab, I and II./ZG 26 moved to Eastern Europe, still under the command of Fliegerkorps VIII. The wing was under the strategic control of Luftflotte 2.

ZG 26 spearheaded the air strikes against the Red Air Force air bases that opened Operation Barbarossa and started the war on the Eastern Front. 5./ZG 26, led by Johannes von Richthofen, a cousin of Wolfram Freiherr von Richthofen [who commanded Fliegerkorps VIII] and Manfred von Richthofen, attacked the air base at Alytus, which had the distinction of becoming the first airfield attacked on 22 June 1941. The Soviet Fighter Aviation Regiment's 15 IAP, attached to the 8th Fighter Division [8 SAD], occupied the base. The Soviet pilots managed to get airborne but did not intercept the Bf 110s, but the Ju 87s of StG 2 and Bf 109s of II./JG 27 which were following up Richthofen's attack. The Soviet bomber regiments were active in the first days and on 29 June they caught and destroyed 10 ZG 26 Bf 110s and II./JG 27 Bf 109s on the ground at Vilnius airfield. Richthofen's own log book recorded 29 combat missions for II./ZG 26 in the first 14 days of July 1941 during the Battle of Smolensk, before it was moved to support Army Group North, under the command of Luftflotte 1.

ZG 26 concentrated in airfield strikes as Army Group North pushed toward Leningrad precipitating a clash with the 5 IAP. 6./ZG 26 reported a loss on 10 August when a MiG-3 belonging to 71 IAP and piloted by Captain Ivan Gorbachyov, rammed one its aircraft. In a notable action on 12 August ZG 26 destroyed 10 to 15 aircraft at Volosovo airfield while the escorting II./JG 54 claimed seven aircraft in combat. On 13 August II./ZG 26 reported one loss over Kingisepp in action with 6 IAP. Commanding officer, JG 54, Hannes Trautloft, believed the ZG 26 attacks were having an impact. 24 Bf 110s from I./ZG 26 strafed Kotly airfield but found only one aircraft and suffered one machine damaged in air combat on 16 August. ZG 26 achieved success against Nizino airfield which housed the 5 IAP on 19 August. For the cost of one Bf 110, Soviet records reported that 20 fighters were destroyed and a further 13 damaged in the attack in contrast to German claims of 40 destroyed. This claim took the total number of claims made by ZG 26 from 22 June 1941, to 191 Soviet aircraft destroyed in the air and 663 on the ground.

On 27 August the Leningrad Front began a full-scale counterattack against the XXXXI Panzer Corps at Mga. ZG 27 fought with the 7 IAK and 5 IAP regiments in "violent aerial clashes." Three Bf 110s were claimed by these fighter units, but German losses are unstated. On 29 August 35 IAP joined the battle and claimed two more Bf 110s. German losses are again unstated. II./ZG 26 supported I./KG 77 and elements of JG 54 and KGr 806 in Operation Beowulf, a seizure of Soviet-held islands in the Baltic. On 6 September ZG 26 attacked the airfield at Kagul and destroyed eight aircraft; the operation was successful. ZG 26 reverted to supporting the Siege of Leningrad in September. On 19 September it supported the largest and most lethal bombing attacks to date as 442 people were killed. The wing reported one crew lost. In late September, ZG 26 was moved back to Luftflotte 2, as part of Fliegerkorps VIII. The wing was ordered to provide close air support for Operation Typhoon, the Battle of Moscow.

The two groups fought in the successful early phase of the battle. On 20 October 1941, I./ZG 26 was ordered to return to Germany and was renamed II./NJG 1 leaving II./ZG 26 and SKG 210 the only Bf 110 units in the Soviet Union. Days later, Luftflotte 2 was ordered to transfer to southern Europe and support the Battle of the Mediterranean. The Moscow offensive failed and was subjected to a large Soviet counter-offensive on 5 December 1941. II./ZG 26 remained on the central sector protecting the Demyansk Pocket.

=== Defence of the Reich and dissolution ===
In the late summer and early autumn the ZG wing's joined the RLV forces for the Defence of the Reich operations against the United States Army Air Force, in particularly the Eighth Air Force. The heavy fighter wings had a chequered past. These units had lost gruppen and staffeln to the German night fighter force but were resurrected in the close air support role where the Luftwaffe maintained a measure of control. The Oberkommando der Luftwaffe still regarded the heavy armament of the Bf 110, and the emerging Messerschmitt Me 410, as ideal bomber-destroying weapons in areas free of American long-range fighter escorts. ZG 26, which had lost one group to NJG 1 in 1941, gained II./ZG 26 back through the renaming and assignment of III./ZG 1.

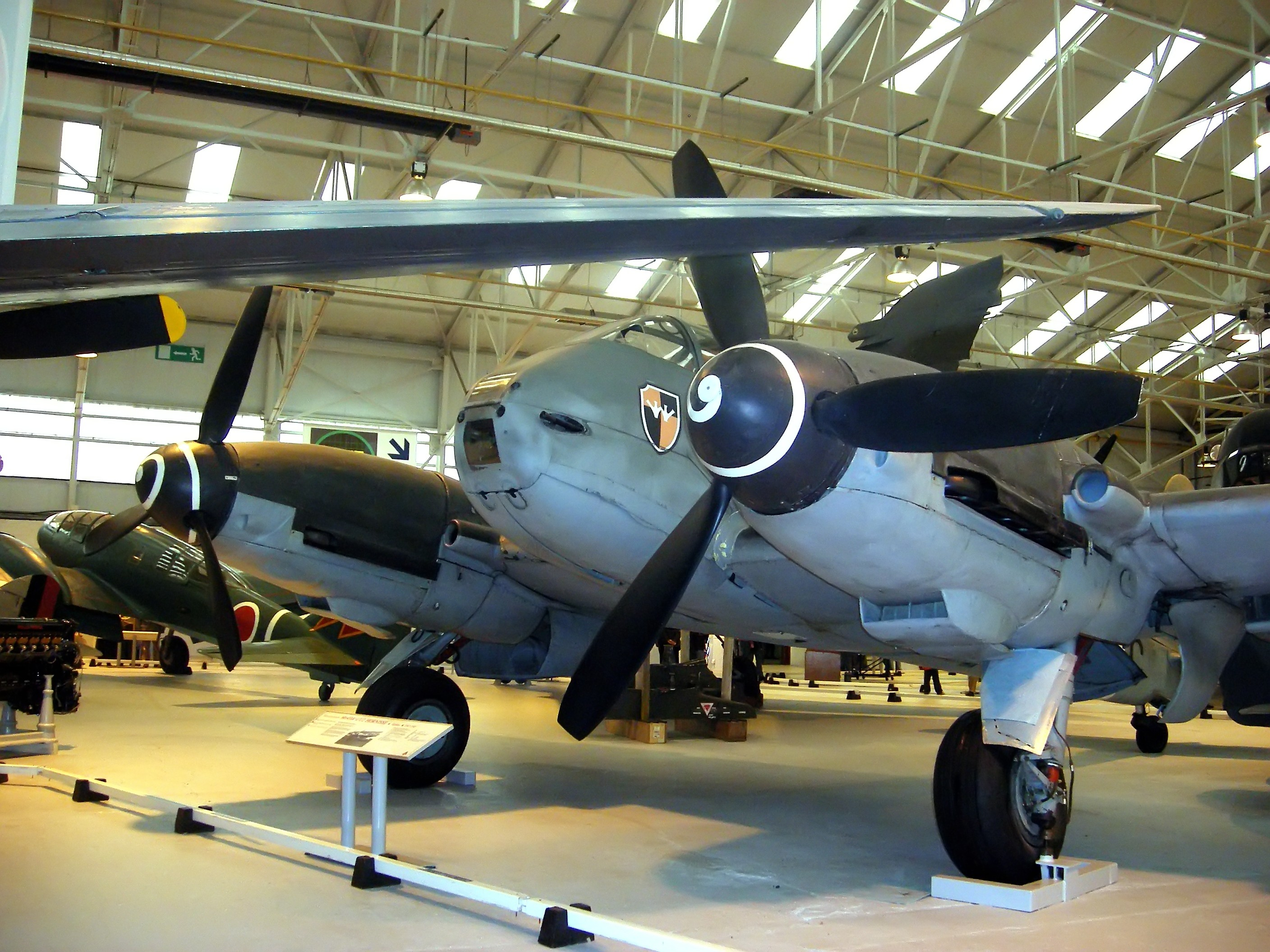
Me 410A at RAF Cosford. This machine served with ZG 26 and was captured in Denmark, May 1945. The wing emblem is visible

Hitler favoured the Rheinmetall BK-5 cannon for use in the Me 410 and they equipped II./ZG 26. The recoil and feed mechanisms were not designed for aerial combat, the gun having been designed initially as an anti-tank weapon. The weapon frequently jammed and rarely could a pilot fire off more than a single round before the gun ceased to function. The fighters could carry an additional Werfer-Granate 21 aerial mortar, as could the Bf 109 or Focke-Wulf Fw 190. In addition, II./ZG 26 was placed under the command of Eduard Tratt, regarded as the leading Zerstörer pilot of the war. By the second week in October, 1943, ZG 26 was operating as a three-gruppen wing.

On 10 October 1943, ZG 26 made its first notable interception of an American heavy bomber formation. On this date, Eighth Air Force planners decided to keep the pressure of the Combined Bomber Offensive on the Luftwaffe fighter force. Jagddivision 2 committed 350 fighters in at least 13 Jagd and Zerstörergruppen to defend the day's target, the city of Münster. JG 1 and JG 26 Bf 109s and Fw 190s attacked the 14th Bombardment Wing with success. The 390th Bomb Group, 90th Bomb Group and 100th Bomb Group formations were broken up and suffered heavy losses. The situation allowed Major Karl Boehm-Tettelbach, commanding III./ZG 26, to attack the shattered wing, leading the 3rd Bombardment Division. In total 30 B-17 Flying Fortress bombers were shot down, along with a single P-47 Thunderbolt fighter. The cost was 25 German fighters and 12 airmen killed. Nine were Bf 110s and Me 410s. It was clear that the destroyer wings required protection from American fighter escorts.

In 1944 the long-range USAAF fighter escorts began to appear. In February, Big Week commenced a systematic series of operations against the Luftwaffe's combat units and supporting industry. In a prelude the Eighth Air Force struck at Frankfurt on 11 February. ZG 26 operated as part of Jagddivision 7. II./ZG 26, II./JG 3 and II./JG 11 responded. 606 Allied fighters covered the bomber stream from 13 US Fighter Groups. The bombers were well protected and lost five and three damaged. The ensuing dogfights cost the Luftwaffe 17 killed and 10 wounded. The VIII Fighter Command lost 13 fighters—eight were P-38 Lightnings from the 20th Fighter Group. Just one bomber—the main targets—and 10 fighters were claimed. ZG 26, which were hard pressed, were effectively protected by Bf 109s this time. Nevertheless, in II./ZG 26, which was the only Me 410-equipped group in the Luftwaffe, the pilots still regarded it as a "suicide command."

Big Week began on 20 February, part of the Pointblank directive. German fighter production was targeted. Specifically, those factories producing the Bf 109, Fw 190, Bf 110, Me 410 and Ju 88. The first day proved costly for the German fighter defences. The northern forces of the operation lost only six bombers, and southern force 15 and four damaged. The defending German units lost 44 aircrew killed, 29 wounded and 74 fighters destroyed with 29 damaged. The Zerstörergeschwader suffered severe losses. III./ZG 26 lost 10 killed and seven wounded along with 10 Bf 110s destroyed and three damaged when it was engaged by P-47 Thunderbolts of the 56th Fighter Group while forming up in the van of attack against the southern force.

On 22 February, 799 bombers were dispatched by the Eighth. The 2nd and 3rd Bombardment Divisions were recalled, leaving only 99 bombers from the 1st Bombardment Division to carry out the mission in scattered over Germany. US escorts claimed 59 destroyed seven damaged and 26 probable victories against German fighters for the loss of 11 and one damaged. German losses were 48 single-engine fighters and 16 Zerstörer. III./ZG 26 was the hardest hit, losing four killed, three wounded and eight Bf 110s. II./ZG 26 lost one Me 410. The pilot was group commander Eduard Tratt, was killed. The most successful Zerstörer pilot of the war, he was awarded the Knight's Cross with Oak Leaves posthumously.

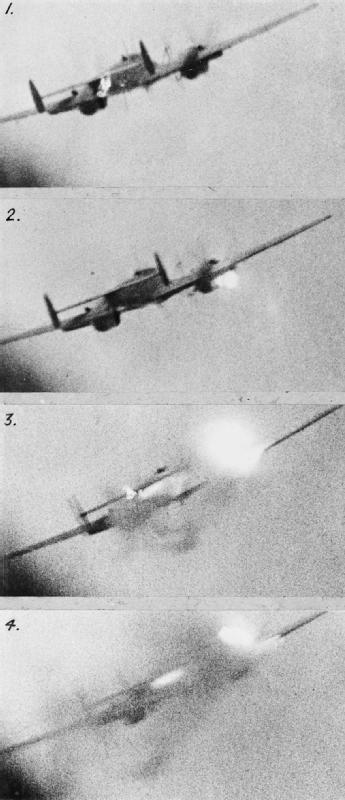
Bf 110 piloted by Heinz Vinke shot down by RAF Fighters, shown on a gun camera film. Zerstörer units suffered heavily in 1944

ZG 26 operated on 6 March 1944 in defence of Berlin. The Eighth made a large-scale attack on the city. III./ZG 26, which had been moved to the operational control of Jagddivision 1, assembled over Magdeburg. Led by Major Hans Kogler, it contained seven cannon-armed Bf 110s in third group and 10 Me 410s of II./ZG 26, each armed with four mortars. They were followed by 24 rocket-armed Bf 110s from ZG 76 from Jagddivision 7. 55 Bf 109s from I./JG 33 provided high cover while 10 fighters from JG 302 supported the interception. The ZG 26 pilots were ordered to attack with rockets from head-on, but this proved difficult. American reports show no B-17 was hit by the 41 Zerstörer. They did use their cannon effective and shot down a number of B-17s. 10 were confirmed. However, P-51 Mustang escort fighters from the 4th Fighter Group descended upon them. The Americans remained upsun until Kogler committed his force. The 357th Fighter Group as also present by accident, having missed the rendezvous with the 2nd Bombardment Division and rushed "to the sound of the guns."

The casualty count reached 16 of the 41 Me 410s and Bf 110s engaged along with five Bf 109s and two Fw 190s. The 1st Bombardment Division lost eight bombers to gunfire, three in collisions, and several damaged and dropped out of formation. Four P-51s were lost from the 4th Fighter Group. Highlighting the plight of Zerstorer units further, was the loss of 11 of the 16 III./NJG 5 Bf 110 night fighters with eight pilots killed. the raid cost the Eighth 69 bombers destroyed and six written off, with 11 escorts and three damaged. The American loss rate of 10.2 percent was acceptable at this stage. The Luftwaffe lost 64 fighters (19.2 percent), with eight killed, 36 missing and 23 wounded.

The German Wehrmachtbericht singled out Kogler as the "leader of a Zerstörerverband that especially distinguished itself" despite crippling losses. The heavy fighters had been touted as wonder weapons in their new role as bomber-destroyers, and their extreme vulnerability was kept from Hitler and the German public.

On 23 April no German twin-engine fighters were seen by the American formations despite large-scale raids on Münster and Braunschweig. By month's end, ZG 26 had relocated to Königsberg in East Prussia. III./ZG 26's war diary observed the mission now would be to "battle enemy formations that penetrate east of Berlin without escort." On 9 April 1944 the 3rd Bombardment Group gave ZG 26 such an opportunity when it flew against targets in East Prussia and Poland. I./ZG 26 had been rendered non-operational, III./ZG 26 had been installing rockets for a ground-attack mission on the Eastern Front when the order to scramble came through. 18 Bf 110s got airborne, were unable to find the bombers and landed at an airfield without the appropriate fuel and were out of commission for the rest of the day. Only II./ZG 26 made an attack, claiming three B-17s for the loss of two Me 410s.

On 11 April the 3rd Bombardment Division, with support from 1st and 2nd, flew against six separate targets in central and eastern Germany. The 3rd took the Baltic Sea route, while the other divisions flew the well-trodden path south to the Zuider Zee. 917 bombers and 819 escorts were in the air and the Luftwaffe reacted by sending 432 sorties from 18 fighter, two heavy fighter and two night fighter groups. The spreading of the bomber stream reduced the escort screen's density. The 4th Fighter Group broke up the only attack on the 3rd Division en route to the target, by ZG 26. On the return, II. and III./ZG 26 caught the bombers unescorted. The Me 410 group attacked with rockets to the rear, while III./ZG 26 carried out four frontal attacks with cannons. They claimed 16 bombers—nine were shot down and a tenth landed in Sweden. A second sortie saw ZG 26 run into the 1st Division escorted by the 4th Fighter Group. Eight Me 410s and three Bf 110s, with 16 crew killed, three wounded.

On 12 May 1944 the Eighth struck at targets in the Dresden area. The bomber stream was heavily engaged by JG 11 and JG 27. All 40 Me 410s that were combat ready were dispatched by ZG 26 to Dresden to await developments as the stream neared Frankfurt. ZG 26 was well-placed to intercept bombers heading towards Chemnitz and did so, claiming three B-17s and two Consolidated B-24 Liberator bombers in exchange for four Me 410s and most their crews to return fire. Stab., I., and II./ZG 26 remained isolated in East Prussia as the Invasion of Normandy occurred in June 1944. It was allotted III./JG 300 to escort it in future interceptions, a role to which the latter was unsuited as it operated the Fw 190 heavy fighter variants. On 15 June the pair formed an attack on the 3rd Bombardment Division near Magdeburg. They downed two B-17s for six losses, though they claimed six bombers and two P-51s. III./JG 300 attacked the 492nd Bombardment Group of the 2nd Bombardment Division which had fallen behind, drawing the small group of American escorts nearby and losing 13 fighters. The attack left the 492nd exposed. Repeated front and rear attacks were made by the Me 410s and they destroyed 13 B-24s. The P-51s returned to and ZG 26 lost 12 of the heavy fighters. German pilots claimed 39 bombers and five fighters. In reality, 13 bombers and two fighters were lost.

On 7 July 1944 Leipzig was targeted. The largest formation to attract the fighter escort was the 42 Me 410s of ZG 26 and 37 Bf 109s now operating in III./JG 300. JG 300 attempted to protect the Me 410s but suffered heavily, losing four killed, three wounded and 13 Bf 109s. ZG 26 lost eight, five killed and four wounded while claiming four B-24s. A 4th Fighter Group P-51 collided with an Me 410 and Captain James Morris, commander of the 20th Fighter Group, was shot down by an Me 410. The American Division reported 20 B-24s lost on the mission, the German JG 300 and ZG 26 wings claimed 51 between them—32 by JG 300, which 27 being "confirmed."

The actions were the last major contributions of ZG 26 to the defence of the Reich. On 26 September 1944, III./ZG 26 began plans to convert to the Messerschmitt Me 262. The group became the fight jet fighter unit (JG 7 became the first jet fighter wing). It was renamed III./JG 6. I./ZG 26 followed suite as I./JG 6, as did II./ZG 26 which became II./JG 6.

== Commanding officers ==
- Oberst Kurt-Bertram von Döring, 1 May 1939 – 14 December 1939
- Oberstleutnant Joachim-Friedrich Huth, 14 December 1939 – 1 November 1940
- Oberst Johann Schalk, 1 November 1940 – 29 September 1941
- Oberstleutnant Karl Boehm-Tettelbach, October 1943 – June 1944
- Oberstleutnant Johann Kogler, June 1944 – July 1944

=== I./ZG 26 ===
- Hauptmann Karl Kaschka, 1 February 1939 – January 1940
- Hauptmann Wilhelm Makrocki, 27 January 1940 – 21 May 1941
- Hauptmann Herbert Kaminski, May 1941 – 1941
- Hauptmann Wilhelm Spies, 27 January 1942

=== II./ZG 26 ===
- Major Friedrich Vollbracht, 1 May 1939 – April 1940
- Hauptmann Ralph von Rettberg, April 1940 – April 1942
- Hauptmann Eduard Tratt, 11 October 1943 – 22 February 1944

=== III./ZG 26 ===
- Hauptmann Johann Schalk, 1 May 1939 – 1 September 1940
- Major Karl Kaschka, 1 September 1940 – 4 December 1941 (KIA)
- Hauptmann Thomas Steinberger, 4 December 1941 – 24 December 1941
- Hauptmann Georg Christl, 25 December 1941 – 12 July 1943
- Major Fritz Schulze-Dickow, 12 July 1943 – 11 February 1944
- Major Johann Kogler, 11 February 1944 – 2 June 1944
- Hauptmann Werner Thierfelder, 2 June 1944 – 18 July 1944
