= Eduard Tratt =

- Born: 24 February 1919; Würzburg, Germany
- Died: 22 February 1944 (aged 24); Nordhausen, Nazi Germany
- Military career
- Allegiance: Nazi Germany
- Branch: Luftwaffe
- Service years: 1937–1944
- Rank: Major
- Unit: ZG 1, Erpr.Gr. 210, SKG 210, ZG 2, Ekdo 25, Ekdo JG 1, ZG 26
- Commands: Ekdo 25, II./ZG 26
- Conflicts: World War II: Invasion of Poland; Battle of France; Battle of Britain; Operation Barbarossa; Defense of the Reich †
- Awards: Knight's Cross of the Iron Cross with Oak Leaves

Eduard Tratt (24 February 1919 – 22 February 1944) was a Luftwaffe fighter, test pilot and flying ace of World War II. Major Eduard Tratt was the highest scoring Zerstörer pilot of the war with 38 victories and Gruppenkommandeur of II./Zerstörergeschwader 26 (ZG 26). He was also a recipient of the Knight's Cross of the Iron Cross with Oak Leaves. The Knight's Cross of the Iron Cross, and its variants were the highest awards in the military and paramilitary forces of Nazi Germany during World War II. On 20 April 1944 he was posthumously promoted to the rank of Major.

== Career ==
Tratt was born on 24 February 1919 in Würzburg then in the Kingdom of Bavaria of the Weimar Republic. Following the compulsory labour service (Reichsarbeitsdienst), Tratt joined the military service of the Luftwaffe on 1 November 1937 as a Fahnenjunker (cadet). He received flight training at the Luftkriegsschule 2 at Gatow, (Note: Flight training in the Luftwaffe progressed through the levels A1, A2 and B1, B2, referred to as A/B flight training. A training included theoretical and practical training in aerobatics, navigation, long-distance flights and dead-stick landings. The B courses included high-altitude flights, instrument flights, night landings and training to handle the aircraft in difficult situations.) and was promoted to Leutnant (second lieutenant) on 1 August 1939.

At the beginning of World War II, Tratt was serving in 1 Staffel, Zerstörergeschwader 1 (ZG 1), flying the Messerschmitt Bf 110 heavy twin-engine fighter. After participation in Polish campaign Tratt took part in the Battle of France, and on 1 June 1940 claimed 3 Hawker Hurricane fighters over Dunkirk. Tratt was wounded in action on 12 August 1940 flying with 2./Zerstörergeschwader 2 (ZG 2) over England.

Later in 1940 Tratt was transferred to 1./Erprobungsgruppe 210. The Gruppe, charged with introducing the new Messerschmitt Me 210 to operations, were, while awaiting delivery of the new aircraft, were pioneering the use of Bf 110 and Bf 109 fighter-bombers in low level, pin-point bombing attacks against British targets. Tratt flew numerous combat missions over England, and by the end of 1940 had 13 victory claims to his credit.

Erprobungsgruppe 210, was redesignated Schnellkampfgeschwader 210 (SKG 210) in April 1941 and transferred to the East to take part in the assault on Russia. As part of 1./SKG 210 Tratt flew over the Central part of the front during Operation Barbarossa supporting the German army's encirclement and overrunning of Russian land forces in the Białystok and Minsk area in the early phase of the campaign. Tratt flew numerous ground attack and fighter missions during 1941 and claimed another 9 victories over Russian aircraft by the end of 1941.

When I Gruppe were recalled to Landsberg-Lech to begin conversion to the Me 210 in January 1942, Tratt was then transferred to command 4 Staffel, Zerstörergeschwader 26 (ZG 26). On 18 February 1942 Oberleutnant Tratt was wounded by ground fire over Rzhev. He was then appointed Staffelkapitän, 6./ZG 26 in March, before being wounded again by enemy fire on 27 March.

Oberleutnant Tratt received the Ritterkreuz in April 1942 and in May was transferred to command 2./ZG 2. He was then sent as Staffelkapitän to 1./ZG 1 in July 1942.

In early 1943 I./ZG 1 flew against targets in the Stalingrad area, but then moved to Poltava, with attacks on Russian troop positions, supply and communications lines, and airfields. On 30 January 1943, Tratt suffered serious injuries (and his Bordfunker Fw. Paul Rennefahrt killed) when he crash-landed his Bf 110 G-2 'RH+YK' after suffering engine damage North of Rowenki.

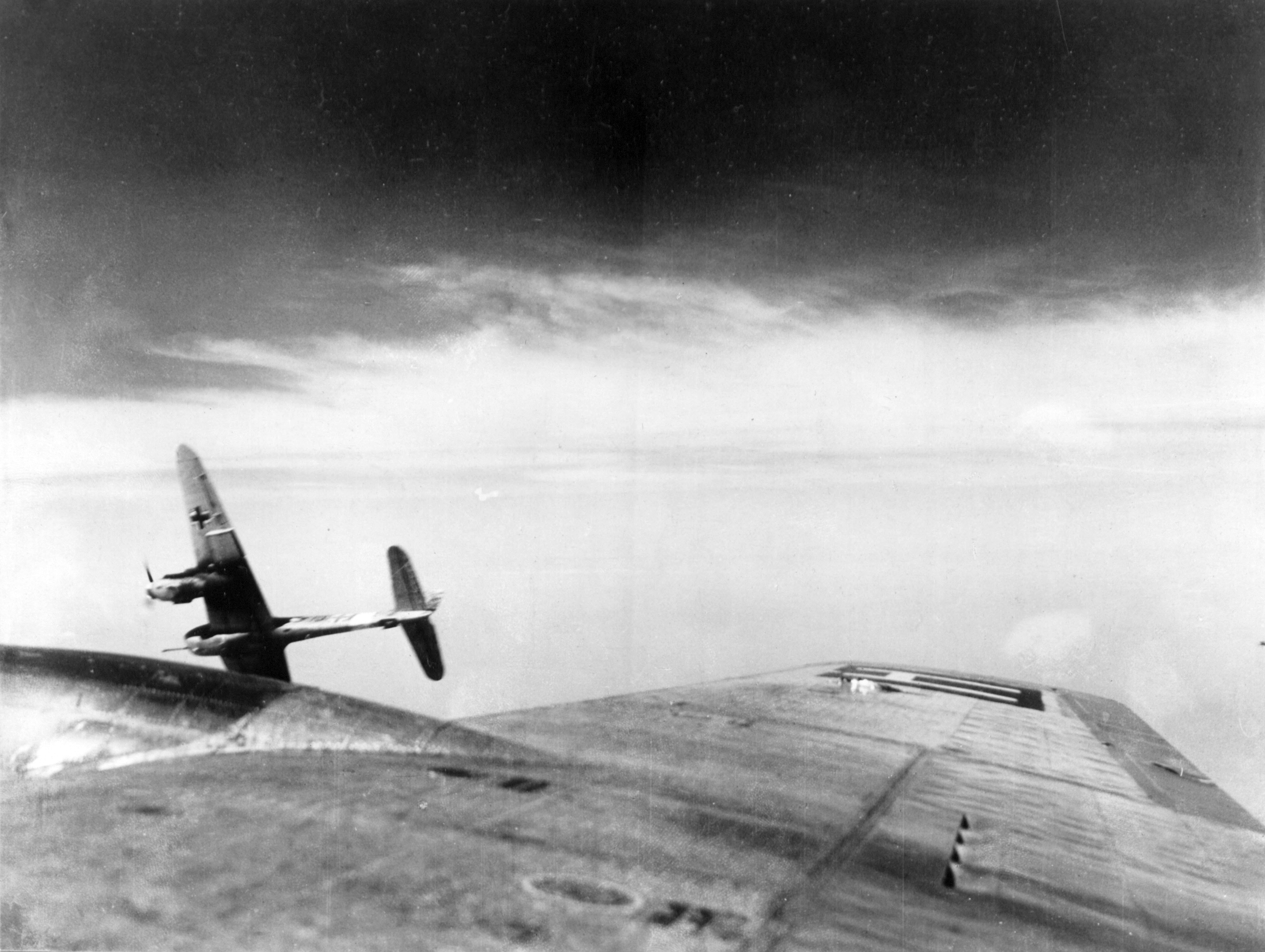
An Me 410A-1/U4 with a BK 5 autocannon finishes its attack on a USAAF B-17

When recovered, Tratt next commanded a special testing unit, Erprobungskommando 25, undertaking the operational testing and evaluation of new weapons for use against the United States Army Air Forces (USAAF) bomber offensive. With the increasing day bombing campaign over the Reich by the USAAF 8th Air Force, the Luftwaffe evaluated various means for its fighters to bring down more bombers during its incursions over occupied Europe. Erprobungskommando 25 was formed to test many and varied technical innovations to achieve that goal.

One of these was the Me 410A-1/U4 (bomber destroyer) armed with a 50 mm BK-5 gun mounted underneath the fuselage. The gun, weighing some 900 kg, severely restricted manoeuvrability, though carrying some 21 rounds and having a recoil pressure of about seven tons.

Hptm. Tratt claimed 2 B-17s during the summer of 1943, on 21 May 1943 with Epr. Kdo. 25, and one North of Baltrum on 13 June 1943 while Tratt briefly commanded Kdo.I./JG 1.

On 11 October 1943 Hauptmann Tratt was appointed Gruppenkommandeur of the reformed II./ZG 26, flying the new heavy fighter versions of the Messerschmitt Me 410 from Hildesheim.

He led the unit on Reichsverteidigung (Defence of the Reich) duties. As late 1943 ground on interceptions were infrequent, but by early 1944 the Zerstörer day fighters found the odds increasingly stacked as the massed American escort fighter accompanied the bombers all the way deep into Germany. During Tratt's tenure in command, II./ZG 26 sustained increasingly heavy losses to these fighter escorts. He claimed a P-38 south of Löningen on 13 November 1943 and on 29 November he shot down a B-17 bomber near Borkum as his 30th victory. On 10 February he claimed a P-38 near Ettenbrock, and on 11 February he claimed another 3 P-38 fighters, shot down in the Oberstein area.

He recorded his final and 38th victory on 20 February 1944; a B-17 of the 452nd Bomb Group, 42-37951 "Mavoureen", which was also attacked by Oberleutnant Dürkopp of 6./ZG 26.

Tratt was shot down and killed (with his gunner Ofw. Gillert) single-handedly attacking B-17's of the 91st Bomb Group near Nordhausen on 22 February 1944, flying a Messerschmitt Me 410B-1/U2/R4. S/Sgt R L Jackson, a right waist gunner of the 401st BS, 91st BG claimed a fighter that day which may have been Tratt.

He was posthumously awarded the Eichenlaub on 26 March 1944 and was promoted to the rank of Major on 20 April 1944.

Major Eduard Tratt was credited with 38 victories in over 350 missions. He recorded 18 victories over the Western Front, including 6 four-engine heavy bombers (5 Boeing B-17 Flying Fortress and 1 Consolidated B-24 Liberator) and 5 P-38 Lightnings. In addition he claimed 26 aircraft destroyed on the ground, 24 tanks, 312 road vehicles/transport and 33 anti-aircraft guns, 4 anti-aircraft batteries and 8 machine-gun nests.

== Summary of career ==
=== Aerial victory claims ===
According to Obermaier, Tratt was credited with 38 aerial victories claimed in 350 combat missions. Mathews and Foreman, authors of Luftwaffe Aces — Biographies and Victory Claims, researched the German Federal Archives and found records for 35 aerial victory claims, plus four further unconfirmed claims. This figure includes 14 aerial victories on the Eastern Front and 21 over the Western Allies, including four four-engined heavy bombers.

=== Awards ===
- Iron Cross (1939)
  - 2nd Class (July 1940)
  - 1st Class (20 August 1940)
- Ehrenpokal der Luftwaffe on 28 September 1940 as Leutnant
- German Cross in Gold on 25 June 1943 as Hauptmann in the 1./Zerstörergeschwader 1 (Note: A Tratt family member indicated that the historic documents in his possession state that Eduard Tratt received the German Cross in Gold while holding the rank of Hauptmann. According to Scherzer, Eduard Tratt held the rank of Oberleutnant.)
- Knight's Cross of the Iron Cross with Oak Leaves
  - Knight's Cross on 12 April 1942 as Oberleutnant and pilot of the I./Zerstörergeschwader 1 (Note: According to Scherzer as pilot in the II./Zerstörergeschwader 1.)
  - 437th Oak Leaves on 26 March 1944 (posthumously) as Hauptmann and Gruppenkommandeur of the II./Zerstöregeschwader 26
