= Jagdgeschwader 134 =

- Arado Ar 68F of the "Horst Wessel" wing, 1936
- Active: 1936–38
- Country: Nazi Germany
- Branch: Luftwaffe
- Type: Fighter
- Role: Air superiority
- Size: Air Force Wing
- Patron: Horst Wessel

Commanders
- Notable commanders: Kurt-Bertram von Döring

Aircraft flown
- Fighter: Ar 65, Ar 68E, Bf 109 B/D

Jagdgeschwader 134 (JG 134) "Horst Wessel" was a Luftwaffe fighter-wing prior to World War II. JG 134 was formed on 4 January 1936 with III. Gruppe in Döberitz. The Geschwader was given the honorific name Horst Wessel on 24 March 1936. II. Gruppe was formed on 15 March 1936 in Werl and was followed by the Geschwaderstab and I. Gruppe on 1 April 1936 in Dortmund. It would later become one of the premier Zerstörer wings of the Luftwaffe, as Zerstörergeschwader 26.

== The Pre-War Years ==
On 7 March 1936, Hptm. Oskar Dinort, the Kommandeur of III. Gruppe (3rd group) of JG 134, was tasked with a mission to assist Hitler in the reoccupation of Germany's western border states. At noon on 8 March two Staffeln (squadrons) from the III. Gruppe were to circle the cathedral of Köln, and then land at the Köln civil airport. With no resistance or push-back from the allies the Gruppe settled in at the airport with their Heinkel He 51 fighters.

== Commanding officers ==
=== Kommodore ===
- Oberstleutnant Kurt-Bertram von Döring, 15 March 1936 – 1 November 1938

=== Gruppenkommandeure ===
I. Gruppe

- Major Josef Kammhuber, 15 March 1936 – 1 March 1937
- Oberstleutnant Hermann Frommherz, 1 March 1937 – 1 November 1938

II. Gruppe

- Major Theo Osterkamp, 15 March 1936 – November 1937
- Major Friedrich Vollbracht, November 1937 – 1 November 1938

III. Gruppe

- Major Oskar Dinort, 4 January 1936 – 15 March 1937

IV.(l) Gruppe

- Hauptmann Johann Schalk, 1 August 1938 – 31 August 1939
