= Joachim-Friedrich Huth =

German general

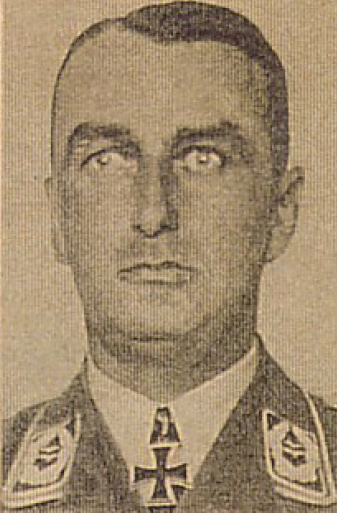
- Born: 31 July 1896; Neuhof, Prussian Saxony, German Empire
- Died: 27 March 1962 (aged 65); Koblenz, Rhineland-Palatinate, West Germany
- Military career
- Allegiance: German Empire; Weimar Republic; Nazi Germany; West Germany
- Branch: Luftwaffe; German Air Force
- Service years: 1914–1920; 1934–1945; 1956–1961
- Rank: Generalleutnant (Wehrmacht); Generalleutnant (Bundeswehr)
- Commands: ZG 26
- Conflicts: World War II
- Awards: Knight's Cross of the Iron Cross

Joachim-Friedrich Huth (31 July 1896 – 27 March 1962) was a German general in the Luftwaffe during World War II and, post-war, the West German Air Force. Huth retired from the Bundeswehr in 1961 holding the rank of generalleutnant.

== Biography ==
Huth was born in 1896 in Neuhof and entered military service in the Prussian Army shortly before the outbreak of World War I, in July 1914. He was promoted to Leutnant on 4 January 1915 and served as platoon leader and company commander in the Infanterie-Regiment Nr. 58 (58th infantry regiment). He was injured three times. He transferred to the Luftstreitkräfte in June 1917 to Jasta 14 and claimed his first aerial victory on 28 January 1918. He was severely injured on 23 March 1918, losing his right lower leg. He almost certainly sustained his injury when he was shot down near the French village of Ham by British sniper Private Leslie Elsby. Huth was awarded both classes of the Iron Cross (1914) and the Knight's Cross to the House Order of Hohenzollern with Swords during the war.

Huth left the military service after the war. The treaty of Versailles had imposed severe restrictions on Germany's military strength and had denied Germany an air force. With Adolf Hitler's rise to power and the remilitarisation of Germany, Huth reentered the military service of the Luftwaffe on 1 March 1934, holding the rank of Hauptmann. He became the Geschwaderkommodore of the Zerstörergeschwader 26 "Horst Wessel". Huth earned the Knight's Cross of the Iron Cross on 11 September 1940 in this position for the successful leadership of his fighter wing in the Battle of France and Battle of Britain.

Huth commanded various fighter divisions from 1942 until 1944 before taking command of the 1. Jagdkorps (1st Fighter Corps) on 26 January 1945. He held this position until the end of the war, when he was taken prisoner by the British forces. He was released in 1946.

In 1956, Huth joined the Bundeswehr after the remilitarisation of the Federal Republic of Germany, holding the rank of Generalmajor. He led the Luftwaffe school at Fürstenfeldbruck and, until his retirement, the Luftwaffengruppe Süd (Air Force Group South) in Karlsruhe. Huth retired on 30 September 1961 with a Großer Zapfenstreich (Grand Tattoo) holding the rank of Generalleutnant. Huth died six months later on 27 March 1962 in Koblenz.

== Awards ==
- Iron Cross (1914) 2nd and 1st Class
- Knight's Cross to the House Order of Hohenzollern with Swords
- Knight's Cross of the Iron Cross on 11 September 1940 as Oberstleutnant and Geschwaderkommodore of ZG 26 "Horst Wessel"

Military offices
Preceded by Oberst Kurt-Bertram von Döring	Commander of Zerstörergeschwader 26 "Horst Wessel"; 14 December 1939 – 1 November 1940	Succeeded by Oberst Johann Schalk
Preceded by Generalmajor Theo Osterkamp	Commander of Jagdfliegerführer 2; 1 August 1941 – 16 August 1942	Succeeded by Oberstleutnant Karl Vieck
New division	Commander of 4. Jagd-Division; 17 August 1942 – 10 November 1943	Succeeded by Generalmajor Werner Junck
Preceded by Oberst Harry von Bülow-Bothkamp	Commander of 5. Jagd-Division; 11 November 1943 – 5 February 1944	Succeeded by Generalmajor Karl Hentschel
Unknown	Commander of 7. Jagd-Division; 6 February 1944 – 30 November 1944	Unknown
Preceded by Generalleutnant Joseph Schmid	Commander of 1. Jagd-Korps; 30 November 1944 – 26 January 1945	Disbanded
