= Zerstörergeschwader 2 =

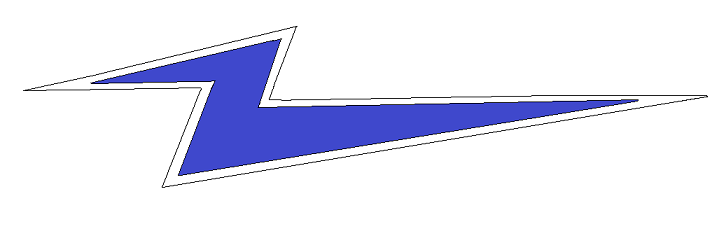
- Stab/ZG 2 emblem
- Active: 1 November 1938 – 20 December 1942
- Country: Nazi Germany
- Branch: Luftwaffe
- Type: Heavy fighter
- Role: air superiority night fighter surgical strike close air support Offensive counter air
- Size: Air Force Wing
- Fighter Aircraft: Messerschmitt Bf 110

Aircraft flown
- Fighter: Bf 109, Bf 110, Me 210

Zerstörergeschwader 2 (ZG 2—2nd Destroyer Wing) (lit. destroyer wing) was a Luftwaffe heavy/destroyer Fighter Aircraft-wing of World War II.

== Formation ==
Zerstörergeschwader 2 (ZG 2—2nd Destroyer Wing) was formed with one Gruppe (group) before the war. Initially, no Geschwaderstab (headquarters unit), II. Gruppe (2nd group) nor III. Gruppe (3rd group) was formed. I. Gruppe (1st group) was formed by renaming I(l). Gruppe (1st group) of Jagdgeschwader 137 (JG 137—137th Fighter Wing) to I. Gruppe of Zerstörergeschwader 231 (ZG 231—231st Destroyer Wing) on 1 November 1938 flying the Messerschmitt Bf 109D-1 single engine fighter. On 1 May 1939, I. Gruppe of ZG 231 became I. Gruppe of ZG 2. During this entire time, the Gruppe was commanded by Hauptmann Johannes Gentzen. This unit was initially based at Bernburg until it was moved to Groß Stein, present-day Kamień Śląski in south-western Poland, on 6 August 1939.

== World War II ==
=== Invasion of Poland and Phoney War ===
On 1 September 1939 I./ZG 2 was informally named as Jagdgruppe 102 (JGr 102—102nd Fighter Group) and flew the Bf 109D. Production at Messerschmitt plants had not reached expectations and the Bf 110 was not delivered to ZG 2 until 1940. Bf 109s equipped seven of the ten Zerstörer groups. I. and II. Gruppe of Zerstörergeschwader 26 (ZG /Destroyer Wing) "Horst Wessel" were the only exceptions. Just 102 Bf 110s were in service on 1 September 1939. The unit was attached to Sturzkampfgeschwader 77 (StG 77—77th Dive Bomber Wing), a Junkers Ju 87 Stuka unit under the command of Günter Schwartzkopff. All three staffeln and the Geschwaderstab was operational at Gross-Stein (Stab., 1 and 3 staffeln) and Zipser-Neudorff (2. Staffel). StG 77 and its subordinated Jagdgruppe were placed under the command of Wolfram Freiherr von Richthofen's Fliegerführer zbV which became the Fliegerkorps VIII. Richthofen's forces operated under the command of Luftflotte 4. According to German plans, Richthofen's forces were to strike into Lesser Poland, toward Kraków, Łódź and Radom in support of the 10th and 14th Armies. JGr 102 [I./ZG 2], had 46 Bf 109Ds combat ready.

The German invasion of Poland began on the 1 September 1939. The invasion began World War II. The Bf 110 Zerstörergeschwader, Zerstörergeschwader 76 (ZG 76—76th Destroyer Wing) and ZG 26 distinguished themselves in the fighter escort role as the long-range bomber pilots from Kampfgeschwader 27 attacked Warsaw airfields to destroy the Polish Air Force. JGr 102, under the command of Hauptmann Gentzen claimed 28 Polish aircraft in aerial combat and a further 50 on the ground. Colonel Stefan Pawlikowski's Warsaw Pursuit Brigade resisted fiercely but lost 17 percent of its fighting strength on 1 September which rose to 72 over the next five days. The unit may have claimed as many as 29 in the air and 78 on the ground. One of JGr 102's missions was providing fighter escort for Ju 87 Stuka dive-bombers in the Bombing of Wieluń. No Polish aerial resistance was encountered. Gentzen claimed seven victories in two days: on 3 September he shot down a PZL.37 Łoś medium bomber and two PZL P.11 fighters. The next day he claimed four PZL.23 Karaś attack-bombers. On the 3rd, the Polish Air Force flew 90 sorties in the Częstochowa-Radomsko area as bombing intensified. The Poles did lose nine P.23s in the area as JGr 102 [I./ZG 2] and I./JG 76 were unleashed on combat patrols.

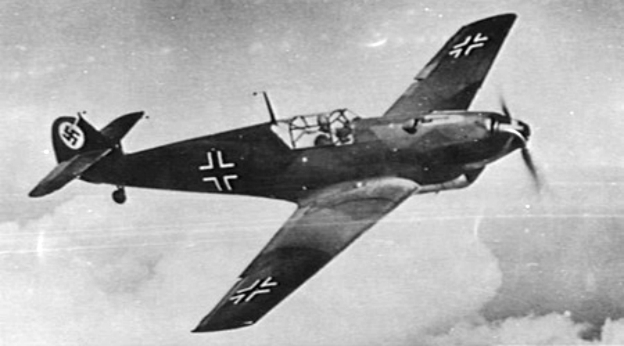
Bf 109D in pre-war, peacetime markings

During the Battle of Łódź, the Łódź Army was left without a fighter shield which had been destroyed by Zerstörer groups days earlier. Gentzen's Bf 109 group completed its destruction by claiming five of its number on 2 September 1939. JGr 102's parent unit, StG 77 continued to support the invasion, and fought in the Battle of Radom and the Siege of Warsaw. Johannes Gentzen, the commanding officer, remarked that the Bf 109 pilot's success over Poland depended largely on luck. Gentzen remarked the Polish were masters of camouflage, the olive-brown combination blended excellently with the landscape. On one occasion, he managed to shoot down a Polish fighter, which glided and landed on a heavily camouflaged airfield before it burst into flames while the pilot ran for cover. The German pilots would not have noticed its existence but for the aerial combat. According to Glentzen, the group proceeded to strafe the airfield, knocking out five Polish bombers and then firing at a row of haystacks which masked more fighter aircraft. JGr 102 based itself at Kraków airfield during the northward advance. Gentzen proved to be the sole Bf 109 flying ace over Poland. The action occurred at Widzew, east of Lodz. The Polish 161 Eskadra lost five fighters. The group continued to fly three to four sorties per day. Based at Debrica on 13 September, a German reconnaissance aircraft delivered a message notifying the unit that an airfield at Brody was full of aircraft. For one Bf 109D, they claimed seven PZL.37 Łoś while Gentzen claimed four two-seater aircraft which were flying nearby, apparently without gunners. Over Brody, in 48 hours, the group claimed 26 Polish aircraft destroyed. The Soviet invasion of Poland occurred on 17 September 1939, and Polish resistance to the aggressor nations ended on 6 October. Luftflotte 4 operations were restricted until the Polish capitulation.

JGr 102 relocated to Lachen–Speyerdorf for the duration of the Phoney War. They countered French Air Force patrols and reconnaissance aircraft from the Groupe de Reconnaissance Strategique (GR). On one such occasion, on 6 November 1939, Gentzen at the head of 27 Bf 109Ds of JGr 102, patrolled the River Saar, only to meet nine French Hawk H 75As of Groupe de Chasse 11/5 escorting a Potez 63 reconnaissance aircraft of the GR 11/22. Gentzen was summoned to Berlin to explain why JGr 102 lost a 25 percent of its strength to a force approximately one-third of its size. The German unit had just dispatched two Mureaux 115s from GAO I and II/506. The resulting dogfight cost Gentzen four pilots. The 15-minute air battle cost the French no casualties, and they claimed four Bf 109s and a further four as probably destroyed. Three of the German pilots were captured after coming down on the French side of the lines. The German pilots had wandered too far to the west near Plappeville. Lieutenant Pierre Houze's fighter suffered some damage from Gentzen during the battle. The cause of this reverse for JGr 102 was the wrong tactical approach of Gentzen and his pilots. Though the Curtis was slightly inferior overall to the Bf 109D, it had a lighter wing loading, was more manoeuvrable, had a faster rate of roll, which enabled it to out-turn the Bf 109D. The automatic constant-speed propeller kept up maximum engine performance/efficiency whereas the Bf 109D pilot had to adjust pitch manually, which caused distractions in a dogfight. Instead of using the Bf 109-preferred tactic of dive-and-zoom, the German pilots stayed to turn and fight. Over-confidence, the experience of Poland, and the spectre of the World War I dogfighting traditions, while speculative, may have led to the JGr 102's defeat. After this encounter, operations were suspended for three months due to inclement weather conditions.

JGr 102 was placed under the command of I Fliegerkorps, based at Bonn-Hangelar on 15 December 1939. In March 1940 JGr 102 began to equip with the Bf 110, shedding its status and becoming I./ZG 2. Ernst Udet increased production by introducing a 10-hour working day. The efforts led to the creation of 30 Kampfstaffeln (bomber squadrons) and 16 Jagdstaffeln (fighter squadrons). Five Zerstörergruppen posing as Jagdgruppen (JGr 101, 102, 126, 152 and 176) finally received Messerschmitt Bf 110 heavy fighters in the spring. On 10 May, now ZG 2, Stab and I. Gruppe were assigned to Jagdfliegerführer 3 at Darmstadt-Griesheim. The small fighter command was subordinated to Luftflotte 3. ZG 2 was appointed a Geschwaderkommodore, Oberstleutnant Friedrich Vollbracht, a World War I fighter pilot who finished his military career with six aerial victories [two in the Great War and four in World War II].

=== Battle of Low Countries and France ===
The Wehrmacht began the invasions of Luxembourg, Belgium, the Netherlands and France on 10 May 1940 under the codename Fall Gelb. The goal of the operation was to lure the powerful French Army and supporting British Army into the Low Countries and then attack in the centre, north of the Maginot Line, and south of the mobile Allied forces through to the English Channel, thereby encircling the latter against the sea. Luftflotte 3 began Offensive counter air operations in the first days of the offensive.

On 11 May I./ZG 2 flew escort for Kampfgeschwader 3 (KG 3—3rd Bomber Wing) Heinkel He 111 bombers in the Mourmelon area. It encountered Hawker Hurricanes from No. 73 Squadron RAF and No. 501 Squadron RAF. In the ensuing battle, 1. and 3. Staffel suffered the loss of one crew. The escort could not prevent three 4. Staffel of Kampfgeschwader 53 (KG 53—53rd Bomber Wing) bombers from being shot down. The performance of the gruppe, according to RAF Advanced Air Striking Force (AASF) losses, was limited to a single 73 Squadron Hurricane shot down. On 12 May the German army captured Sedan. German bomber wings were operational in the Charleville–Méziéres–Rethel area. II Fliegerkorps supported the 12th army. III. Gruppe of Kampfgeschwader 2 (KG 2—2nd Bomber Wing) concentrated on road traffic in the Charelville area. I. and II. Gruppe of KG 3 bombed targets Vouziers. I./KG 53 bombed the Sedan II. Gruppe of Kampfgeschwader 55 (KG 55—55th Bomber Wing) attacked targets in Rethel. Escorts were provided from V(Z)/LG 1 and I./ZG 2. French fighter units GC I/5, GC II/2, GC III/7 supported by 501 Squadron attacked the bombers. I./ZG 2 fought No. 501 Squadron, the RAF pilots claimed one of their aircraft. Two of the British Hurricanes were shot down. One pilot was killed. ZG 2 was involved the defence of the bridges over the Meuse during the Battle of Sedan. On 14 May the AASF suffered heavy losses and the day's actions became known in the Luftwaffe as "the day of the fighters." In supporting Ju 87 operations I./ZG 2 claimed one No. 3 Squadron RAF Hurricane in the Sedan area, the pilot surviving. The following day, I./ZG 2 are known to have fought No. 73 Squadron RAF over Vouziers; one Bf 110 crew were captured and another machine from Stab. I./ZG 2 was severely damaged. Three No. 73 Squadron fighters were shot down with the pilots surviving wounded. On 20 May, as the Panzer Divisions reached the English Channel and completed the encirclement, I./ZG 2 escorted Dornier Do 17s from I./KG 3 as they attacked targets near Abbeville. One 3./KG 3 was damaged, but Staffelkäpitan Fritz Lüders and his gunner from the Stabstaffel were killed.

The Zerstörergeschwader wings followed the advance across France. I Gruppe was transferred to Bruno Loerzer's air corps and was ordered to escort KG 53 in bombing rail and road traffic between the Seine and Aisne. ZG 2 operated in the western reaches of this air space. I./ZG 2 were based at a forward airfield at Neufchâteau, Liège by 26 May as the Battle of Dunkirk began. The area experienced nuisance raids by RAF Bomber Command. Gentzen, commanding I./ZG 2, angered by the persistent attacks, took off to chase a formation of Bristol Blenheims only to crash and die on 26 May 1940. Major Ernst Ott took command of I./ZG 2. Loerzer's II Fliegerkorps had rendered aerial interdiction support to the 2nd army and 12th army through to 23 May [operations suspended due to bad weather]. With Robert Ritter von Greim's V Fliegerkorps, they struck at rail targets 54 times and "localities" 47 times from 20 to 23 May. On 25 May Loerzer's airmen flew 254 bombing raids to support the advance to Amiens. I./ZG 2 was ordered specifically to escort KG 53 through this period.

=== Battle of Britain ===
In June and July 1940, I./ZG 2 moved into Amiens – Glisy Aerodrome. A newly formed II./ZG 2 moved to Guyancourt, doubling ZG 2 strength for Operation Eagle Attack, the plan for achieving air superiority over Britain for a supposed invasion, Operation Sea Lion. Hauptmann Harry Carl commanded II Gruppe. The Luftwaffe order of battle August 1940 indicated it was once again assigned to Jagdfliegerführer 3 (Oberst Werner Junck). The small fighter leader command was placed under Luftflotte 3. The first phase of the Battle of Britain was the Kanalkampf (Channel Struggle). The Luftwaffe tried to lure RAF Fighter Command into battle by attacking Allied Channel convoys bringing in supplies from abroad and moving materials around the British coast. On 8 August 1940 ZG 2 fought over the Convoy Peewit. 82 Ju 87s from III./StG 1, I./StG 3 and Stab, II./StG 77 were alerted. Major Walter Sigel led StG 3 to rendezvous with escorts from Bf 110s from II./ZG 2, LG 1 and Bf 109s from II./JG 27. On 11 August 1940 ZG 2 escorted I and II./KG 54 "Totenkopf" Junkers Ju 88 bombers in an attack on Royal Navy bases at Portsmouth and Weymouth. 61 Bf 110s were committed to the operation. No. 11 Group RAF responded, and ZG 2 were engaged by No. 609 Squadron RAF. Among the RAF ranks was the fighter ace John Dundas and Noel Agazarian. The pilots claimed five Bf 110s. Commanding officer, I./ZG 2, Ernst Otto was killed. The German pilots recovered and Dundas' Supermarine Spitfire was badly damaged. ZG 2 engaged further RAF fighter units and claimed an exaggerated 17 Hurricanes and Spitfires shot down for two additional losses. No. 601 Squadron RAF lost four Hurricanes. No. 145 Squadron RAF lost four in this action, two crash-landed and were repaired but two pilots were killed. Bf 109s from III./JG 2 and III./JG 53 were supposed to cover ZG 2 but they turned back after running out of ammunition. JG 2 claimed seven for four lost, and two pilots; eight Bf 109s were written-off in total. III./JG 53 were credited with three. KG 54 destroyed oil tanks, damaged two freighters and a destroyer but lost five Ju 88s and the commanding officer of the group when a Hurricane flight escaped the attention of ZG 2 and attacked. The following day, 12 August, ZG 2 and ZG 76 put 120 Bf 110s into the air to escort 100 KG 51 Ju 88s. 25 Bf 109s from JG 53 were brought in to assist. The Germans headed to the Isle of Wight and split up. The Bf 110s circled to attract fighters while the Ju 88 began the bomb run on Portsmouth docks. 11 Group engaged ZG 2 and shot down four and damaged three others. Among the dead was one Staffelkapitan. No. 257 Squadron RAF were known to have fought and accounted for some of the ZG 2 casualties.

The second phase of the battle began on 13 August 1940, known as "Adlertag" in the Luftwaffe. The Luftwaffe focused on Fighter Command airfields in southern England, though faulty intelligence caused German bombers to attack RAF Coastal Command, Bomber Command and Fleet Air Arm bases instead. At 05:05, 18 Ju 88s from II./KG 54 took off for RAF Odiham. At 05:50, 88 Junkers Ju 87s of StG 77 began heading for Portland Harbour. The raids were escorted by about 60 Bf 110s of ZG 2 and V./LG 1 and 173 Bf 109s from JG 27, JG 53 and JG 3, which all flew ahead of the bomber stream to clear the airspace of enemy fighters. StG 77's target was obscured by cloud, but KG 54 continued to their target. RAF fighters from RAF Northolt, RAF Tangmere and RAF Middle Wallop intercepted. Four Ju 88s and one Bf 109 from JG 2 was shot down. The German fighters claimed six RAF fighters and the bombers another 14. In reality, the bombers only damaged five. The Bf 109s destroyed only one and damaged another. Of the five RAF fighters damaged by the bombers, two were write-offs. Of the 20 claimed, just three fighters were lost and three pilots were wounded. None were killed. Further missions by II./KG 54 to RAF Croydon were cancelled. I./KG 54 struck at the Fleet Air Arm (FAA) base at Gosport. ZG 2 was supposed to provide escort during one these attacks, and in a breakdown of communications, arrived over the target without their Ju 88s, which had been ordered to stand down. One Bf 110 was shot down by No. 238 Squadron RAF and two more damaged.

The 15 August 1940 was another day of intense air fighting. When it was over, it became known as "Black Thursday" in the Luftwaffe. All three German Luftflotten tried to attack Fighter Command stations from the north, and south. 60 Ju 88s from I. and II./LG 1 bombed RAF Worthy Down and RAF Middle Wallop. 40 I./ZG 2 Bf 110s escorted them. En route to the target, 43, 249, 601, 609 Squadrons intercepted. The German formation fought their way through over Southampton and the Solent. Little damage was done to either airfield, and I./ZG 1 lost just one Bf 110. I. and II./LG 1 lost one and seven Ju 88s respectively. The following morning, II./ZG 2 lost two crews, one of whom was the commanding officer Hauptmann Harry Carl. No. 249 Squadron RAF reported being attacked by Bf 110s on 16 August, losing three Hurricanes. One pilot, Pilot Officer Martyn King died after his parachute was shot at after bailing out. Flight Lieutenant James Nicholson noticed a Bf 110 circling him suspiciously as he hung in his parachute, he played dead and his act worked.

ZG 2 did not operate in the 18 August battles. As the battles continued into late August ZG 2 remained in the fight. From 17 to 23 August 1940 no losses are recorded. On 24 August one crew was reported shot down and killed in combat off Cherbourg. On 25 August both gruppen flew as escort for II./KG 51 and II./KG 54 with V./LG 1 supporting ZG 2. As they approached Weymouth Bay, the German formation split into three groups; of 30 Ju 88s and 40 Bf 110s. 11 Group hit the Bf 110s as they crossed the coast. I./ZG 2 lost four aircraft to No. 17 Squadron RAF. II./ZG 2 fared better, and three of their Bf 110s were damaged. Bf 109s from JG 53 appeared to save the Bf 110s; 17 Squadron lost one Hurricane each to ZG 2 and JG 53. No. 609 Suffered damage to two Spitfires. JG 53 reported th loss of four Bf 109s, one to 17 and three to No. 87 Squadron RAF. ZG 2 was in action on 26 August and reported one loss, probably when escorting KG 2 and KG 3 Dorniers to RAF Hornchurch and RAF Debden. On 30 August II./ZG 2 fought Spitfires of No. 222 Squadron RAF, destroying one and badly damaging two others. No. 253 Squadron RAF were responsible for the only loss. The action killed Hauptmann Schuldt. Three aircraft were lost to accidents on 31 August and 1 September. I. and II./ZG 2 lost two each in combat with No. 249 Squadron RAF on 2 September. The following day I. Gruppe loss of five in combat above North Weald airfield; four to No. 310 Squadron RAF and one No. 46 Squadron RAF. ZG 2 suffered heavy losses as 80 of them protected 54 Do 17s from KG 3. The ZG 2 pilots succeeded in inflicting high casualties on RAF fighters in this action with ZG 26, which reported two losses and two damaged. 310 Squadron lost one fighter and 46 Squadron three and one pilot killed. 257 Squadron lost three fighters destroyed and one damaged. The fourth day ended with one Bf 110 destroyed against No. 234 Squadron RAF; one British fighter sustained damaged.

On 7 September 1940, Göring ordered the bombing of the Greater London area. The Oberkommando der Luftwaffe felt Fighter Command had been worn down, and a massive attack on the British capital would draw out the remaining RAF reserves to be destroyed. ZG 2 was involved in the days fighting. Five ZG 2 crews (three from I. Gruppe) were shot down after encountering strong opposition from the Duxford Wing in an evening attack. On 11 and 28 September, one day after its official dissolution, German loss records indicate one Bf 110 from ZG 2 was lost; no further losses appear for the wing for the remainder of September 1940. ZG 2's first incarnation did not survive beyond September 1940. On 27 September it was disbanded and its crews sent to night fighter schools to form II./NJG 2 and II./NJG 3. The decision to do so was not because of losses. ZG 2 performed just as well as the average German fighter unit. In July and August 1940, I. and II./ZG 2 suffered 21 and 19 losses respectively. III./JG 26 lost 22 in the same period. I. and II./JG 27 lost 22 and 19 Bf 109s. ZG 2 had claimed approximately 300 enemy aircraft destroyed for 52 losses since September 1939. Leutnant Hans Schmid on II./ZG 2 was credited with 15; 8 in the Battle of Britain.

=== Eastern Front ===
Stab/ZG 2 was reformed at Landsberg in April 1942. I/ZG 2 reformed from I/ZG 26's three staffeln. II/ZG 2 was activated with three new staffeln, 4, 5 and 6. III/ZG 2 was formed from three new staffeln also; 7, 8 and 9.

ZG 2 was transferred to Luftflotte 4 on the Eastern Front. ZG 2 fought in the initial phases of Operation Blue, which triggered the Battle of Stalingrad and Battle of the Caucasus. In preparation for the offensive, the German 6th Amy began Operation "Wilhelm", to seize staging areas near Volchansk. ZG 2, along with II/StG 1, SG 1, ZG 1, KG 27, KG 51 and KG 55 supported the offensive. On 10 June, the first day, 20 Zerstörer were lost from ZG 1 and 2. The Luftwaffe was strongly opposed by the 8th Air Army and 4th Air Army.

On 24 June, I/ZG 2, escorted by I/JG 52, attacked the radio stations at Kupyansk. The 206 IAD, which had lost 34 fighters since late May, engaged. According to the 206 IAD war diary, the Soviet records report the loss of eight Yak-1s (six from 427 IAP and two from 515 IAP) were shot down and two more damaged. A further five made force-landings. Anton Yakimenko, Hero of the Soviet Union, was the only pilot to return to base and claimed all of the three German aircraft the Soviets accounted for. 2/ZG 2 lost two crews in a collision, one was shot down, and another badly damaged. I/JG 52 lost one pilot, the 14-victory ace Oskar Wunder. Luftlfotte 4's losses in close air support aircraft were severe. Only 86 Bf 110s were available on 20 July between two Zerstörergeschwader, and so ZG 2 was withdrawn from the theatre by August 1942, handing over its aircraft to reinforce ZG 1.

=== North African Front, disbandment ===
Stab/ZG 2 remained in existence and was ordered to Parndorf, Austria in August 1942. I/ZG 2 was dissolved and partially merged into NJG 4 and redesignated III/ZG 1. II/ZG 2 was moved to Wiener-Neustadt and redesignated I/NJG 5. The activity left the command unit and III/ZG 2 the only surviving elements. III/ZG 2 became III/SKG 10 on 20 December 1942, leaving Stab/ZG 2 which remained the geschwader command unit. It is believed the Geschwaderstab disbanded the same month.

Stab and III/ZG 2 located to Comiso and Bizerta in Italy and North Africa in November 1942 under Luftflotte 2 and then II Fliegerkorps and then Fliegerfuhrer Tunis.

== Commanding officers ==
Stab/ZG 2

- Major Friedrich Vollbracht
- Oberst Ralph von Rettberg

I/ZG 2

- Major Johannes Gentzen
- Major Ernst Ott
- Hauptmann Hans-Peter Külbel
- Hauptmann Christians
- Hauptmann Eberhard Heinlein

II/ZG 2

- Hauptmann Harry Carl
- Hauptmann Eberhard Heinlein
- Major Karl-Heinz Lessmann
- Major Gerhard Weyer

III/ZG 2

- Hauptmann Wilhelm Hachfeld
- Hauptmann Hans-Jobst Hauenschil
