= Johann Schalk =

German World War II flying ace and wing commander

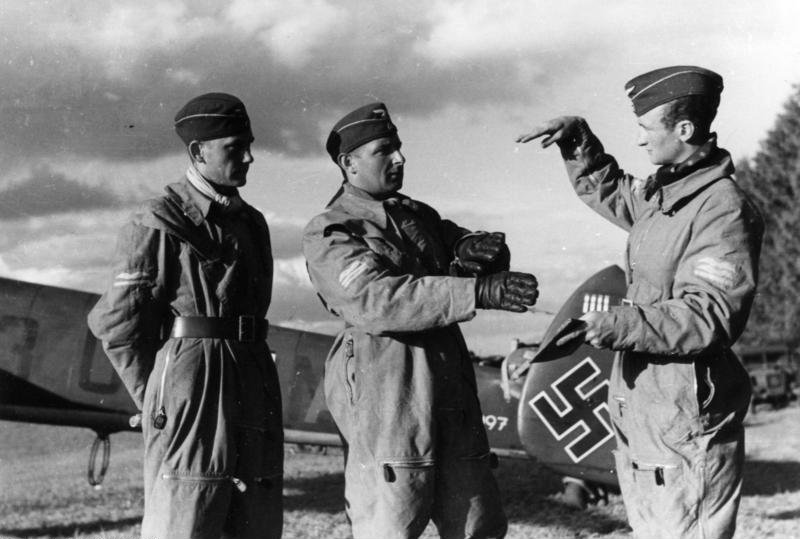
- Johann Schalk (center) and Theodor Rossiwall (right)
- Born: 19 September 1903; Krems an der Donau, Lower Austria
- Died: 9 November 1987 (aged 84); Graz
- Military career
- Allegiance: First Austrian Republic (to 1934); Federal State of Austria; Nazi Germany
- Branch: Bundesheer; Luftwaffe
- Service years: 1922–1945
- Rank: Oberst (colonel)
- Units: ZG 26, NJG 3, NJG 4
- Conflicts: World War II
- Awards: Knight's Cross of the Iron Cross

Johann (Hans) Schalk (Note: First name is Johann according to Fellgiebel and Scherzer while Obermaier lists him as Hans.) (19 September 1903 – 9 November 1987) was a Nazi German flying ace and high-ranking officer in the German Luftwaffe during World War II. He is credited with 15 aerial victories, 4 of which on the Eastern Front, claimed in 163 combat missions.

== Early life and career ==
Schalk joined the Austrian Bundesheer in 1922 and as a Leutnant was trained to fly in 1928 and transferred to the Luftstreitkräfte. He became a leader of a fighter squadron in August 1933 and was appointed commander of the Austrian Jagdgruppe 1 (1st fighter group). He was one of the best Austrian aerobatic pilots and gained experience at various delegations to Germany and Italy. After the Anschluss, the annexation of Austria and the integration of the Bundesheer into the German Wehrmacht.

On 1 July 1938, Schalk was tasked with the creation of IV.(leichte) Gruppe (4th light group) of Jagdgeschwader 134 "Horst Wessel" (JG 134—134th Fighter Wing) at Dortmund. The unit was initially equipped with the Arado Ar 68 biplane fighter but shortly after converted to the Messerschmitt Bf 109 D-1. On 5 September, Schalk was ordered to relocate the Gruppe to Neisse, present-day Nysa, Poland, where it was renamed on 1 November and became the III. Gruppe of Zerstörergeschwader 142 (ZG 142—142nd Destroyer Wing). That day, the unit was ordered to Lippstadt Airfield. On 1 May 1939, the Gruppe was again renamed and became the III. Gruppe of Zerstörergeschwader 26 (ZG 26—26th Destroyer Wing). In August 1939, Schalk moved his Gruppe to Neumünster.

== World War II ==
World War II began at 04:45 on Friday 1 September 1939 when German forces crossed the Polish border. Schalk claimed his first aerial victory over a French Morane-Saulnier M.S.406 fighter on 12 May 1940 near Ghent during the Battle of France. He claimed two further victories during the Battle of France and six during the Battle of Britain, three of which were shot down by his wireless radio operator Unteroffizier Hans Scheuplein. Schalk claimed his seventh aerial victory on 24 August, a Royal Air Force Hawker Hurricane fighter from No. 151 Squadron.

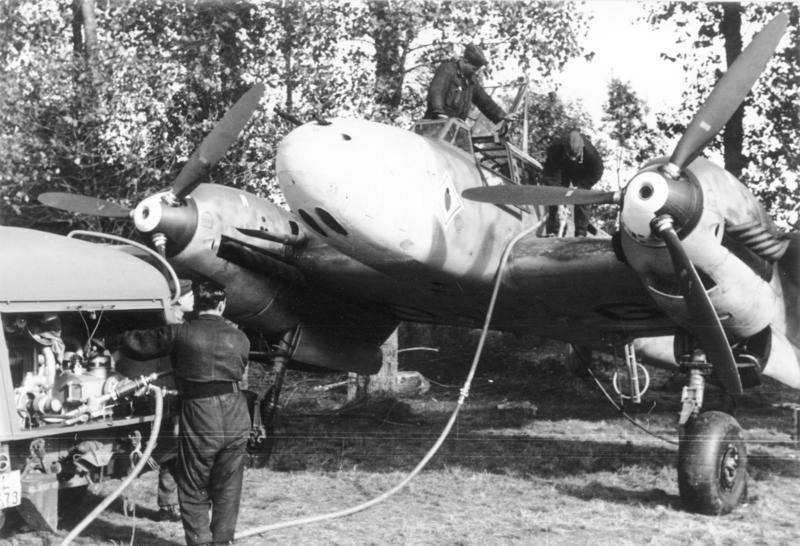
A Bf 110 from ZG 26 similar to those flown by Schalk

Schalk was the first member of the Luftwaffe to receive the Honour Goblet of the Luftwaffe (Ehrenpokal der Luftwaffe). He was also one of the first Zerstörer (destroyer) pilot to receive the Knight's Cross of the Iron Cross (Ritterkreuz des Eisernen Kreuzes) on 11 September 1940 after nine aerial victories. The other two Zerstörer pilots who had received the Knight's Cross in September 1940 were Joachim-Friedrich Huth and Walter Grabmann.

=== Night fighter force ===
On 29 March 1941, Schalk was given the position of Geschwaderkommodore (wing commander) of Nachtjagdgeschwader 3 (NJG 3—3rd Night Fighter Wing). He held this position until 1 August 1943 when he transferred command to Major Helmut Lent. Schalk was then given the position of Jagdfliegerführer 2 (Chief of Fighter Aviation, Air Fleet 2), the commander of the Fighter forces of a Luftflotte.

== Summary of career ==
=== Aerial victory claims ===
Mathews and Foreman, authors of Luftwaffe Aces — Biographies and Victory Claims, researched the German Federal Archives and state that Schalk was credited with 15 aerial victory claims with four aerial victories on the Eastern Front and 11 on the Western Front.

=== Awards ===
- Iron Cross (1939) 2nd and 1st class
- Honour Goblet of the Luftwaffe on 21 August 1940 as Oberstleutnant in Zerstörergeschwader 26
- Knight's Cross of the Iron Cross on 5 September 1940 as Oberstleutnant and Gruppenkommandeur of the III./Zerstörergeschwader 26 "Horst Wessel"

== Notes ==
Military offices
Preceded by Oberstleutnant Joachim-Friedrich Huth	Commander of Zerstörergeschwader 26; 1 November 1940 – 29 September 1941	Succeeded by Oberstleutnant Karl Boehm-Tettelbach
Preceded by —	Commander of Nachtjagdgeschwader 3; 1 December 1941 – 1 August 1943	Succeeded by Oberst Helmut Lent
Preceded by Oberst Karl Hentschel	Commander of Jagdfliegerführer Deutsche Bucht; 1 October 1943 – 1 December 1943	Succeeded by redesignated to Jagdfliegerführer 2
