= Jagdfliegerführer 2 =

Jagdfliegerführer 2 (Chief of Fighter Aviation, Air Fleet 2) was part of Luftflotte 2 (Air Fleet 2), one of the primary divisions of the German Luftwaffe in World War II. It was formed 21 December 1939 in Dortmund. On 6 September 1943 the unit redesignated Jagdfliegerführer 4 and reformed again in September 1943 from Stab/Jagdfliegerführer Deutsche Bucht. The headquarters was located at Dortmund and from July 1940 in Wissant, from June 1941 at Le Touquet, and from September 1943 in Stade. The unit was disbanded in December 1943.

== Commanding officers ==
=== Fliegerführer ===
- Generalmajor Kurt-Bertram von Döring, 21 December 1939 – 1 December 1940
- Generalmajor Theo Osterkamp, 1 December 1940 – July 1941
- Oberst Joachim-Friedrich Huth, 1 August 1941 – 16 August 1942
- Oberstleutnant Karl Vieck, August 1942 – 11 January 1943
- Major Josef Priller, 11 January 1943 – 6 September 1943
- Oberstleutnant Johann Schalk, September 1943 – December 1943
