= Karl Kaschka =

Austrian fencer

Personal information
- Nationality: Austrian
- Born: 8 January 1904 Vienna, Austria-Hungary
- Died: 4 December 1941 (aged 37) Marj, Libya

Sport
- Sport: Fencing

Karl Konrad Kaschka (8 January 1904 – 4 December 1941) was an Austrian fencer. He competed as captain of Austria in the team sabre event at the 1936 Summer Olympics in Austria, where his team scored fifth.

Being member of the German Air Force, he was killed in action during World War II when his plane was shot down in Al-Marj, Libya.
