= Luftwaffe Fliegerführer =

The post/unit of a Fliegerfuhrer was a provisional headquarters for flying units as part of the Second World War's Luftwaffe Organization. The Fliegerfuhrer had command of a particular area of operations and was generally responsible directly to the Luftflotte commander of their area. In some cases they reported to other Fliegerfuhrer such as Fliegerfuhrer Atlantik who reported to Fliegerfuhrer West (who was also the commander of Luftflotte III. The Fliegerfuhrer was usually named after the area in which it operated and, if not, was given an Arabic numeral. The Fliegerfuhrer commanded Geschwader (wings) as well as separate Gruppen (groups) and Staffeln (squadrons). Where Fliegerfuhrer commanded only fighter aircraft, they were designated Jagdfliegerfuhrer.

== Fliegerführer ==
Fliegerführer 1	Fliegerführer 2	Fliegerführer 3	Fliegerführer 4
Fliegerführer 5	Fliegerführer 6	Fliegerführer 200	Fliegerführer Afrika
Fliegerführer Albanien	Fliegerführer Arad	Fliegerführer Atlantik	Fliegerführer Eismeer
Angriffsführer England	Fliegerführer Graz	Fliegerführer Irak	Fliegerführer Kreta
Fliegerführer Kroatien	Fliegerführer Lofoten	Fliegerführer Nordbalkan	Fliegerführer Nordmeer
Fliegerführer Nord (Ost)	Fliegerführer Nord	Fliegerführer Nord (West)	Fliegerführer Ostsee
Fliegerführer Sardinien	See-Fliegerführer Schwarzes Meer	Fliegerführer Süd	Fliegerführer West
Fliegerführer z.b.V.

== Jagdfliegerführer ==
A Jagdfliegerführer, or Jafü, was the commander of the Fighter forces of a Luftflotte.

Jagdfliegerführer 1	Jagdfliegerführer 2	Jagdfliegerführer 3	Jagdfliegerführer 4
Jagdfliegerführer 5	Jagdfliegerführer Balkan	Jagdfliegerführer Berlin	Jagdfliegerführer Bretagne
Jagdfliegerführer Dänemark	Jagdfliegerführer Deutsche Bucht	Jagdfliegerführer Griechenland	Jagdfliegerführer Holland
Jagdfliegerführer Mitte	Jagdfliegerführer Mitteldeutschland	Jagdfliegerführer Mittelrhein	Jagdfliegerführer Norwegen
Jagdfliegerführer Oberitalien	Jagdfliegerführer Ostmark	Jagdfliegerführer Ostpreussen	Jagdfliegerführer Paris
Jagdfliegerführer Rumänien	Jagdfliegerführer Schlesien	Jagdfliegerführer Sizilien	Jagdfliegerführer Süddeutschland
Jagdfliegerführer Südfrankreich	Jagdfliegerführer Ungarn
