= Josef Priller =

German World War II flying ace and wing commander (1915–1961)

- Josef Priller in World War II
- Born: 27 June 1915; Ingolstadt, German Empire
- Died: 20 May 1961 (aged 45); Böbing, West Germany
- Burial place: Westfriedhof Augsburg
- Military career
- Allegiance: Nazi Germany
- Branch: Army (1935–36); Luftwaffe (1936–45)
- Service years: 1935–1945
- Rank: Oberst (colonel)
- Nickname: Pips
- Units: JG 71, JG 51 and JG 26
- Commands: JG 26
- Conflicts: See battles World War II: Phoney War; Battle of France; Battle of Britain; Western Front
- Awards: Knight's Cross of the Iron Cross with Oak Leaves and Swords
- Other work: Manager of the Riegele brewery

Josef "Pips" Priller (German: [ˈpʁɪlɐ]; 27 June 1915 – 20 May 1961) was a German military aviator and wing commander in the Luftwaffe during World War II. As a fighter ace, he was credited with 101 enemy aircraft shot down in 307 combat missions. All of his victories were claimed over the Western Front, including 11 four-engine bombers and at least 68 Supermarine Spitfire fighters.

Priller joined the military service in the Wehrmacht of Nazi Germany in 1935. Initially serving in the Army, he transferred to the Luftwaffe (Air Force) in 1936. Following flight training, he was posted to Jagdgeschwader 334 (JG 334—334th Fighter Wing) and then to Jagdgeschwader 51 (JG 51—51st Fighter Wing) on 1 May 1939. On 1 September 1939, the day when Germany invaded Poland, he was appointed squadron leader of the 6. Staffel of JG 51. He flew in the Battle of France and claimed his first aerial victory on 28 May 1940. He received the Knight's Cross of the Iron Cross in October 1940 following his 20th aerial victory which he claimed during the Battle of Britain.

In November 1940, Priller was transferred to Jagdgeschwader 26 "Schlageter" (JG 26—26th Fighter Wing) and was given command of the 1st Squadron. In June and July 1941 he accounted for a further 20 victories, earning him the Knight's Cross of the Iron Cross with Oak Leaves on 19 October 1941. Priller was appointed group commander of the III. Gruppe of JG 26 "Schlageter" on 6 December 1941. He claimed his 70th victory on 5 May 1942. Priller became wing commander of JG 26 "Schlageter" on 11 January 1943. During the Allied Invasion of Normandy on 6 June 1944 he flew one of the few Luftwaffe missions against the Allied beachhead that day. Priller claimed his 100th victory on 15 June 1944. For this achievement he was awarded the Knight's Cross of the Iron Cross with Oak Leaves and Swords. During Operation Bodenplatte on 1 January 1945, Priller led an attack on the Allied airfields at Brussels-Evere and Brussels-Grimbergen. On 31 January 1945 Priller was appointed Inspekteur der Jagdflieger West (Inspector of Fighter Pilots West) and ceased operational flying. He held this position until the end of the war in May 1945.

Following the war, Priller managed the family brewery and farming business. He died in 1961.

== Early life and career ==
Priller, who was nicknamed Pips since his early youth, was born on 27 July 1915 in Ingolstadt in the Kingdom of Bavaria, a state of the German Empire. After he graduated with his Abitur (diploma) he joined the military service of the Wehrmacht as a Fahnenjunker (officer candidate) with Infantry-Regiment 20 in Amberg of the 10th Infantry Division on 1 April 1935. Against the will of his battalion commander he transferred to the Luftwaffe as an Oberfähnrich (officer cadet) on 1 October 1936. He then received flight training at the pilot school in Salzwedel. (Note: Flight training in the Luftwaffe progressed through the levels A1, A2 and B1, B2, referred to as A/B flight training. A training included theoretical and practical training in aerobatics, navigation, long-distance flights and dead-stick landings. The B courses included high-altitude flights, instrument flights, night landings and training to handle the aircraft in difficult situations. For pilots destined to fly multi-engine aircraft, the training was completed with the Luftwaffe Advanced Pilot's Certificate (Erweiterter Luftwaffen-Flugzeugführerschein), also known as the C-Certificate.) On 1 April 1937, he was promoted to Leutnant (second lieutenant).

Following flight training, Priller was posted to the Jagdgruppe Wiesbaden, this unit was later designated I. Gruppe (1st group) of Jagdgeschwader 334 and then became I. Gruppe of Jagdgeschwader 133 on 1 November 1938. (Note: For an explanation of Luftwaffe unit designations see Organisation of the Luftwaffe during World War II.) He was then transferred to Bad Aibling, serving with I. Gruppe of Jagdgeschwader 135, a unit which on 1 May 1939 formed I. Gruppe of Jagdgeschwader 51 (JG 51—51st Fighter Wing) and was commanded by Major Max Ibel. With JG 51, he served as the Nachrichtenoffizier (communication officer) of I. Gruppe. In July 1939, he was posted to I. Gruppe of Jagdgeschwader 71, which on 1 November was renamed to II. Gruppe of JG 51. Priller was promoted to Oberleutnant (first lieutenant) on 1 September 1939.

== World War II ==
World War II in Europe began on Friday, 1 September 1939, when German forces invaded Poland. At the time, II. Gruppe of JG 51 was still forming at Fürstenfeldbruck, made up of three Staffeln (squadrons) designated 4., 5. and 6. Staffel. Priller was appointed Staffelkapitän (squadron leader) on 20 October and tasked with forming of 6. Staffel (6th squadron) at Eutingen im Gäu. On 5 November, 6. Staffel became operational. On 9 February 1940, II. Gruppe moved to Böblingen Airfield and subordinated to Jagdgeschwader 52 (JG 52—52nd Fighter Wing), tasked with patrolling the Upper Rhine region during the Phoney War period.

On 11 May 1940, the second day of the Battle of France, II. Gruppe flew ground attack missions in the Alsace region. Following the German advance into Belgium and France, 6. Staffel was moved to Dinant on 26 May. That day, remnants of the French Army and the British Expeditionary Force (BEF) were retreating towards Dunkirk. To save the BEF, the British under the cover of the Royal Air Force (RAF), had launched Operation Dynamo. On 28 May, Priller claimed his first two aerial victories. He was credited with shooting down two RAF fighters over the Dunkirk battle zone. RAF Fighter Command reported eight Hawker Hurricanes shot down, four pilots killed in action and one as a prisoner of war on 28 May. Two Supermarine Spitfires were damaged in combat with Bf 109s. German pilots claimed 26 British aircraft on this date. For this achievement, Priller was awarded the Iron Cross 2nd Class (Eisernes Kreuz zweiter Klasse) on 30 May 1940. In total, Priller was credited with six aerial victories during the French campaign, including a Spitfire and Hurricane claimed on 28 May, a Curtiss P-36 Hawk on 2 June, two Bristol Blenheim bombers on 8 June, and another Spitfire on 25 June. As one of the leading fighter pilots of JG 51 during the Battle of France, Priller received the Iron Cross 1st Class (Eisernes Kreuz erster Klasse) on 10 July 1940.

=== Battle of Britain ===
In July 1940, the Luftwaffe began a series of air operations dubbed Kanalkampf (Channel Battle) over the English Channel against the RAF, which marked the beginning of the Battle of Britain. On 14 July, Priller claimed a Hurricane shot down southeast of Dover. Pilot Officer M. R. Mudie, piloting Hurricane L1584, No. 615 Squadron was killed in combat with a JG 51 Bf 109. On 20 July, Priller claimed another Hurricane in the afternoon at 19:20 CET. No. 32 Squadron lost two Hurricanes in combat with JG 51 at this time—one pilot was killed, Squadron Leader J Worrall survived. Pilot Officer G Keighley, 610 Squadron was shot down by JG 51 at the same time. Off Dover on 29 July, Priller claimed a Spitfire. Two Spitfires from No. 41 Squadron force-landed with battle damage and one pilot, Flying Officer D. R. Gamblen. No. 56 Squadron lost Flight Sergeant C. J. Cooney killed.

From 13 August—Adlertag—the Luftwaffe targeted airfields. On 14 August Priller claimed another Spitfire at 13:45. Fighter Command lost seven fighters. No Spitfires were lost at this time and place, but at 12:45 GMT two No. 615 Squadron Hurricane pilots were killed in combat off Dover. Pilot Officer R. Montgomery and Flying Officer P. Collard died aged 26 and 24. The following day, 15 August, developed into a large series of battles over southern and northern England. To the Germans it became known as "Black Thursday" due to the scale of the losses. 130 Bf 109s from JG 51, JG 52 and JG 54 escorted 88 Dornier Do 17 bombers from KG 3 to targets in the south. As the formation approached Deal, 60 Bf 109s from JG 26 carried out a fighter sweep either side of Dover. Seven RAF squadrons intercepted but could not penetrate the fighter screen. No. 64, No. 111 and No. 151 Squadron are known to have engaged at approximately 15:30 GMT. 64 lost two Spitfires and one pilot, 111 lost one Hurricane and another damaged with one pilot killed, and No. 151 Squadron suffered damage to one Hurricane. Priller claimed a Hurricane. The following afternoon, Priller claimed a Hurricane over Canterbury. Elements of JG 51 engaged No. 111 Squadron and two 4./JG 51 pilots were posted missing. 111 Squadron pilot Sergeant R. Carnall was burned when shot down while another pilot was killed in a head-on collision with a Do 17. On 24 August Priller continued claiming with two further fighters destroyed. JG 51 lost four pilots in combat with 32 and No. 56 Squadron. Five No. 32 Squadron Hurricanes were shot down with one pilot wounded while No. 65 Squadron suffered no losses. Updated sources show a single Spitfire from No. 65 Squadron was damaged but was repaired. On 26 August Priller made a claim west of Boulogne, France at 18:57 local time. Sergeant P. T. Wareing, No. 616 Squadron, was reported missing at approximately 18:45, shot down over the French coast, reportedly near Calais. Wareing was captured.

Priller filed no claims in September 1940 as the air battles reached a climax. On 7 October Priller claimed a victory in the morning and afternoon. Three JG 51 fighters were destroyed in combat with RAF fighters. One of these losses was inflicted by No. 501 Squadron. The British unit lost one pilot killed; Flying Officer N J M Barry. Another Spitfire was damaged in a collision with a Bf 109. During the day Fighter Command reported 14 fighters destroyed and three damaged. On 15 October 1940, Priller claimed two fighters in the early afternoon. No. 92 Squadron accounted for one of the JG 51's casualties, and lost one Spitfire in the engagement [two were lost in an early morning battle]. Pilot Officer J W Lund was rescued by naval craft. Fighter Command reported 15 fighters destroyed in combat with Bf 109s and two damaged. A final 20th claim made by Priller on 17 October was his last of the Battle of Britain. Pilot Officer H W Reilly, No. 66 Squadron, was killed in combat with JG 51 over Kent. On 19 October 1940, Priller was awarded the Knight's Cross of the Iron Cross (Ritterkreuz des Eisernen Kreuzes). He was the fourth pilot of JG 51 to receive this distinction.

=== With Jagdgeschwader 26 "Schlageter" ===
Emblem of JG 26 "Schlageter"

In November 1940, the Geschwaderkommodore (wing commander) of Jagdgeschwader 26 "Schlageter" (JG 26—26th Fighter Wing), Adolf Galland, used his influence with the Ministry of Aviation (RLM—Reichsluftfahrtministerium) in Berlin and had Priller transferred to JG 26. JG 26 was named after Albert Leo Schlageter, a martyr cultivated by the Nazi Party. Priller arrived with JG 26 on 19 November, taking command of 1. Staffel, a squadron of I. Gruppe, as Staffelkapitän. On 16 June 1941, the RAF flew "Circus" No. 13, targeting Boulogne with six Blenheim bombers, escorted by six squadrons of fighter escort from No. 11 Group. The RAF attack was countered by I. Gruppe and JG 26's Stabsschwarm. During this engagement, Priller claimed a Spitfire and a Blenheim from No. 59 Squadron shot down.

Between 16 June and 11 July 1941, Priller claimed 19 RAF aircraft, including 17 Spitfires. Priller's first claims of the year were made on 16 June. Fighter Command reported six losses, although British sources credit the loss of four to JG 26. Squadron Leader John Mungo-Park, commanding No. 74 Squadron, force-landed after combat. Pilot Officer D H Gage of No. 91 Squadron was killed over the Channel; both pilots were lost in action with an unstated unit. No. 1, No. 54 and No. 258 Squadrons reported one loss each. Sergeant A Nasswetter, a Czech pilot of the latter squadron, died of his wounds.

On 7 July Priller claimed two Spitfires. Fighter Command reported three aircraft destroyed, and their pilots wounded. On 14 July, RAF "Circus" No. 48 targeted the Hazebrouck motor yards. The attack force of Blenheim bombers was escorted by Spitfire fighters. Priller attacked the fighters of No. 72 Squadron south of Dunkirk and shot down one of the Spitfires from dead ahead, taking his total to 40 aerial victories. Priller's adversary was Sergeant W M Lamberton in R7219, who was captured, wounded. For this achievement, Priller was awarded the Knight's Cross of the Iron Cross with Oak Leaves (Ritterkreuz des Eisernen Kreuzes mit Eichenlaub) on 20 July 1941. By this date, he had accumulated 41 aerial victories and was the 28th member of the German armed forces to be so honored. His 41st aerial victory had been claimed over another No. 72 Squadron Spitfire on 19 July 5 kilometres (3.1 miles) off Dover. The presentation of the Oak Leaves was made by Adolf Hitler at the Wolf's Lair, Hitler's headquarters in Rastenburg. Two other Luftwaffe officers were presented with awards that day by Hitler, Major Günther Freiherr von Maltzahn and Major Günther Lützow were also awarded the Oak Leaves.

=== Group commander ===
On 22 November 1941, Reichsmarschall Hermann Göring informed Galland that he would succeed Oberst Werner Mölders as General der Jagdflieger (General of the Fighter Arm), a staff position with the RLM in Berlin. In consequence of this decision, on 6 December, Major Gerhard Schöpfel, Gruppenkommandeur (group commander) of III. Gruppe was appointed Geschwaderkommodore of JG 26, and Priller was given command of III. Gruppe, and Oberleutnant Josef Haiböck took over 1. Staffel. On 11 December, Priller was one of the first pilots to receive a then new Focke-Wulf Fw 190 A-2 radial engine powered fighter aircraft, testing it on nineteen flights before year's end.

Priller engaged in combat for the first time while flying the Fw 190 on 3 January 1942. On a test flight, he claimed a Hurricane shot down 5 km (3.1 mi) northwest of Calais. On 1 May, Fighter Command ordered one "Circus" and four "Rodeos" to France. III. Gruppe was scrambled and attacked elements of the Kenley Wing near Calais. During this attack, III. Gruppe claimed four aerial victories, one of which by Priller who shot down a Spitfire 5 km (3.1 mi) north of Calais.

On 9 October, Priller for the first time encountered heavy bombers of the United States Army Air Forces (USAAF). Misjudging the size of the bombers, he underestimated their altitude and had to make three approaches before coming into an attack position. Attacking from the rear, Priller shot down a Consolidated B-24 Liberator from the 93d Bombardment Group. On 20 December, Priller claimed his 81st aerial victory when he shot down a Boeing B-17 Flying Fortress bomber from the 91st Bombardment Group over the Baie de la Seine. That day, the USAAF VIII Bomber Command, later renamed to Eighth Air Force, had targeted Lille with 101 B-17s and B-24s.

=== Wing Commander ===
Priller was promoted to Major (major) on 1 January 1943. On 8 January 1943, at a Luftwaffe conference in Berlin, General der Jagdflieger (General of the Fighter Arm) Galland informed Geschwaderkommodore Schöpfel that he was to be transferred to a staff position with Jagdfliegerführer Bretagne and that Priller would be replacing Schöpfel as Geschwaderkommodore of JG 26. Priller was also told that JG 26 was scheduled to be deployed on the Eastern Front. On 10 January, Priller took over command of JG 26. His first task was to work out the plans for the transfer to the Eastern Front. The original idea was to transfer the various Gruppen of JG 26 in exchange for the Gruppen of Jagdgeschwader 54 (JG 54—54th Fighter Wing) which were planned to move west. By March 1943, the first Gruppe to arrive on the Western Front had been III. Gruppe of JG 54. Since the combat conditions on the Western Front differed from those on the Eastern Front, a smooth transition of units proved to be more difficult than expected. Priller's reports to Galland were pessimistic of the idea and in consequence, on 27 March, Galland postponed the decision to exchange units, a plan that was later cancelled.

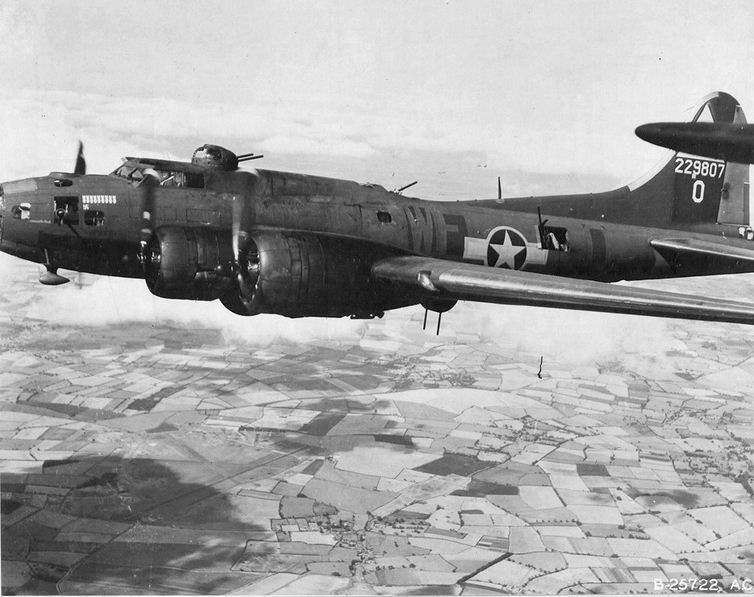
"Lady Liberty", a Boeing B-17 Flying Fortress, was shot down over the Netherlands by Priller on 19 August 1943.

On 19 August, VIII Bomber Command sent a number of B-17 bombers in an attack on Luftwaffe airfields at Woensdrecht, Gilze-Rijen and Souburg. The attack force was escorted by ten squadrons of Spitfires during the approach and two groups of Republic P-47 Thunderbolt fighters over the target areas, and two further groups of P-47s during the return. Priller led his Stabsschwarm and 8. Staffel in this engagement. Avoiding combat with the 56th Fighter Group, he led his flight in a frontal attack on the B-17 bombers which resulted in the destruction of two B-17s from the 305th Bombardment Group.

On 20 October, Priller attacked a 96th Bombardment Group B-17 bomber during its mission to Düren and shot it out of formation. This Herausschuss (separation shot)—the damaged heavy bomber was forced to separate from its combat box—was counted as an aerial victory by the Luftwaffe. In late 1943, in parallel to his obligations as Geschwaderkommodore, Priller served as interims Jagdfliegerführer 4, the commander of the fighter forces of Luftflotte 3. Priller was promoted to Oberstleutnant (lieutenant colonel) on 1 January 1944.

On 6 June 1944 (D-Day), Priller, accompanied by his wingman made a single strafing pass attack on Sword Beach in their Focke-Wulf Fw 190A-8s. This act was first brought to the world's attention by the book, then the film, The Longest Day. Contrary to popular belief, Priller and his wingman (Feldwebel Heinz Wodarczyk) were not the only Luftwaffe forces to attack the beachhead that day. Both Luftwaffe Hauptmann (Captain) Helmut Eberspächer, leading a ground-attack four-plane element of Fw 190s of Schnellkampfgeschwader 10, which downed a quartet of RAF Avro Lancasters at 05:00 over the invasion area, and the Luftwaffe bomber wing Kampfgeschwader 54 made several attacks on the British beachheads on D-Day.

The Eighth Air Force attacked various tactical targets in France on 15 June. To counter this attack, Jagdfliegerführer 5 dispatched the German fighters at dawn. Priller and his wingman, Unteroffizier Heinz Wodarczyk, joined II. Gruppe, heading for the area west of Caen and encountered the USAAF heavy bombers just as they were crossing the French coast. Avoiding the escort fighters, Priller attacked the first combat box of about twenty B-24 bombers from the front. Priller shot down a B-24 from the 492nd Bomb Group flying in the left outboard position at 07:10 west of Dreux and southwest of Chartres. This aerial victory was Priller's 100th claim. He was the 77th Luftwaffe pilot to achieve the century mark. Priller was awarded the Knight's Cross of the Iron Cross with Oak Leaves and Swords (Ritterkreuz des Eisernen Kreuzes mit Eichenlaub und Schwertern) on 2 July 1944. He was the 93rd member of the German armed forces to be so honored.

On 1 January 1945, he led JG 26 in the ill-fated mass attack on Allied airfields, in Operation Bodenplatte, (an operation that saw Wodarczyk killed). That day, Priller was promoted to Oberst (colonel). On 28 January 1945, Priller left JG 26 and was replaced as Geschwaderkommodore of JG 26 by Major Franz Götz. Priller was appointed as Inspector of Day Fighters (West), a staff position with the Inspector of Fighters.

== After the war ==
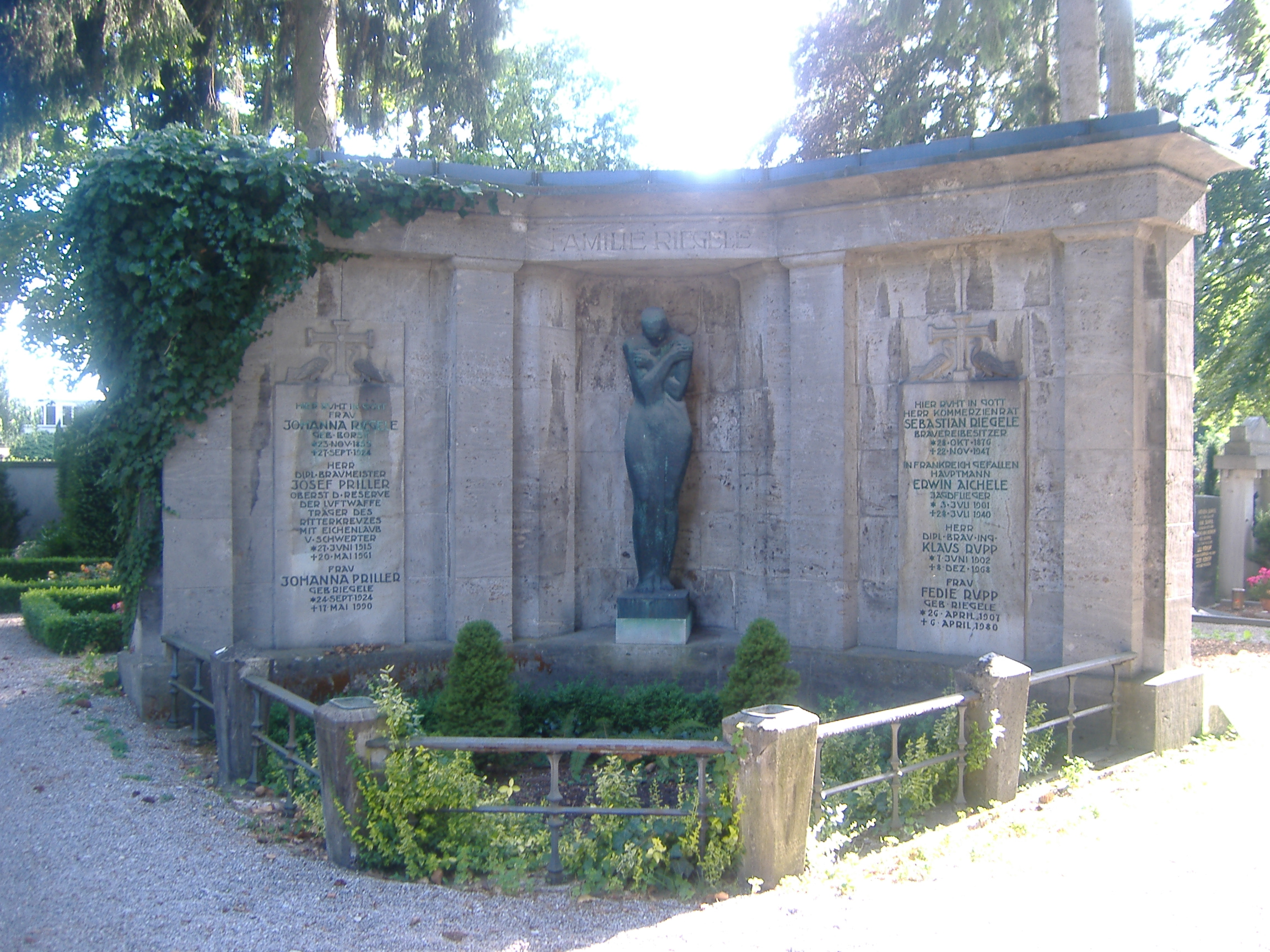
Priller's grave (middle left) on the Westfriedhof in Augsburg.

After the war, Priller studied brewing at the Weihenstephan Science Centre for Life & Food Sciences, Land Use and Environment (WZW), a department of the Technical University of Munich. Following graduation, he became general manager of the Riegele brewery after his marriage to the owner, Johanna Riegele-Priller. He was one of several D-day combatants to advise on the making of the film The Longest Day, in which he was portrayed by Heinz Reincke. He died on 20 May 1961 at the age of 45 from a heart attack in Böbing, Upper Bavaria. He was buried at the Westfriedhof (western cemetery) in Augsburg. The street "Josef-Priller-Straße" in Augsburg and Fürstenfeldbruck were named after him. His oldest son Sebastian became head of the Riegele Brewery in 1991.

== Summary of career ==
=== Aerial victory claims ===
According to US historian David T. Zabecki, Priller was credited with 101 aerial victories. Priller flew 307 combat missions to claim 101 victories. All his victories were recorded over the Western Front, and consisted of 11 USAAF heavy bombers, 68 Spitfires (the highest Luftwaffe ace's tally for this type), 11 Hurricanes, five medium bombers and five USAAF fighters. Spick also lists him with 101 aerial victories claimed in 307 combat missions, and a mission-to-claim ratio of 3.04. Mathews and Foreman, authors of Luftwaffe Aces — Biographies and Victory Claims, researched the German Federal Archives and found records for 100 aerial victory claims, plus three further unconfirmed claims. All of his victories were claimed on the Western Front and included ten four-engined bombers.

Victory claims were logged to a map-reference (PQ = Planquadrat), for example "PQ 05 Ost ML-7". The Luftwaffe grid map (Jägermeldenetz) covered all of Europe, western Russia and North Africa and was composed of rectangles measuring 15 minutes of latitude by 30 minutes of longitude, an area of about 360 square miles (930 km^{2}). These sectors were then subdivided into 36 smaller units to give a location area 3 km × 4 km (1.9 mi × 2.5 mi) in size.

Chronicle of aerial victories
This and the – (dash) indicates unconfirmed aerial victory claims for which Priller did not receive credit. This along with the * (asterisk) indicates an Herausschuss (separation shot)—a severely damaged heavy bomber forced to separate from his combat box which was counted as an aerial victory. This and the ? (question mark) indicates information discrepancies listed by Prien, Stemmer, Rodeike, Bock, Mathews and Foreman.
Claim	Date	Time	Type	Location	Claim	Date	Time	Type	Location
– 6. Staffel of Jagdgeschwader 51 – Battle of France — 10 May – 25 June 1940
1	28 May 1940	13:07	Spitfire	northwest of Dunkirk	4	8 June 1940	19:05	Blenheim	Abbeville
2	28 May 1940	13:10	Hurricane	northwest of Dunkirk	5	8 June 1940	19:06	Blenheim	Abbeville
3	2 June 1940	21:15	Curtiss	southwest of Dunkirk	6	25 June 1940	18:20	Spitfire	8 km (5.0 mi) northwest of Desvres
– 6. Staffel of Jagdgeschwader 51 – Action at the Channel and over England — 26 June 1940 – 7 June 1941
7	14 July 1940	16:25	Hurricane	southeast of Dover	14	24 August 1940	14:10	Hurricane	2 km (1.2 mi) east of Margate
8	20 July 1940	19:20	Hurricane	5 km (3.1 mi) east of Folkestone	15	26 August 1940	18:57	Spitfire	5 km (3.1 mi) west of Boulogne
9	29 July 1940	08:40	Spitfire	5 km (3.1 mi) north of Dover	16	7 October 1940	11:35	Spitfire	20 km (12 mi) north of Canterbury
10	14 August 1940	13:45	Spitfire	northwest of Dover	17	7 October 1940	17:40	Spitfire	Thames Estuary
11	15 August 1940	16:15	Hurricane	1 km (0.62 mi) east of Clacton	18	15 October 1940	13:10	Hurricane	10 km (6.2 mi) southwest of Dover
12	16 August 1940	13:35? (Note: According to Mathews and Foreman claimed at 13:55.)	Spitfire	10 km (6.2 mi) east of Canterbury	19	15 October 1940	13:15	Hurricane	15 km (9.3 mi) west of Dover
13	24 August 1940	13:55	Hurricane	7 km (4.3 mi) east of Margate	20	17 October 1940	16:35	Hurricane	Tunbridge Wells
– 1. Staffel of Jagdgeschwader 26 "Schlageter" – On the Western Front — June 1941
21	16 June 1941	16:35	Spitfire	west of Boulogne	23	17 June 1941	19:42	Hurricane	west of Cap Gris-Nez
22	16 June 1941	16:45	Blenheim	southwest of Boulogne	24	21 June 1941	12:40	Spitfire	southwest of Ramsgate
– 1. Staffel of Jagdgeschwader 26 "Schlageter" – On the Western Front — 22 June – 31 December 1941
25	23 June 1941	13:35	Spitfire	south of Somme Estuary	42	22 July 1941	13:40	Spitfire	northwest of Gravelines
26	25 June 1941	13:00	Spitfire	west of Gravelines	43	23 July 1941	14:05? (Note: According to Mathews and Foreman claimed at 14:06.)	Spitfire	16 km (9.9 mi) north of Gravelines
27	27 June 1941	22:00	Spitfire	southwest of Gravelines	44	24 July 1941	14:45	Spitfire	northwest of Dunkirk
28	30 June 1941	18:56	Spitfire	10 km (6.2 mi) northwest of Saint-Inglevert	45	7 August 1941	11:30	Spitfire	northwest of Calais
29	2 July 1941	12:45	Spitfire	10 km (6.2 mi) west of Lille	46	7 August 1941	18:20	Spitfire	west of Calais
30	4 July 1941	14:55	Spitfire	10 km (6.2 mi) southwest of Saint-Omer	47	4 September 1941	17:30	Spitfire	north of Béthune
31	5 July 1941	13:40	Spitfire	northwest of Dunkirk	48	17 September 1941	15:35	Spitfire	5 km (3.1 mi) south of Calais
32	7 July 1941	10:00	Spitfire	north of Gravelines	49	18 September 1941	16:25	Spitfire	5 km (3.1 mi) west of Dungeness
33	7 July 1941	10:47	Spitfire	west of Somme Estuary	50	1 October 1941	14:57	Spitfire	in the middle of the English Channel
34	8 July 1941	15:30	Spitfire	north of Saint-Omer	51	1 October 1941	15:35	Spitfire	west of Boulogne
35	9 July 1941	14:00	Spitfire	south of Aire	52	12 October 1941	13:25	Spitfire	5 km (3.1 mi) east of Berck
36	9 July 1941	14:10	Spitfire	south of Calais	53	13 October 1941	15:30	Spitfire	5 km (3.1 mi) west of Berck
37	10 July 1941	12:30	Spitfire	north of Saint-Omer	54	21 October 1941	12:55	Spitfire	5 km (3.1 mi) west of Étaples
38	10 July 1941	12:40	Spitfire	northwest of Boulogne	55	21 October 1941	13:05	Spitfire	15 km (9.3 mi) west-southwest of Le Touquet
39	11 July 1941	16:10	Spitfire	west of Calais	56	27 October 1941	13:15	Spitfire	5 km (3.1 mi) north of Watten
40	14 July 1941	10:30	Spitfire	south of Dunkirk; 1 km (0.62 mi) north of Ferques	57	8 November 1941	12:50	Spitfire	north of Béthune
41	19 July 1941	14:35	Spitfire	Dover	58	8 November 1941	13:10	Spitfire	5 km (3.1 mi) abeam of Gravelines
– Stab III. Gruppe of Jagdgeschwader 26 "Schlageter" – On the Western Front — 1 January – 31 December 1942
59	3 January 1942	15:38	Hurricane	5 km (3.1 mi) northwest of Calais	71	9 May 1942	13:40	Spitfire	3 km (1.9 mi) north of Gravelines
60	27 March 1942	16:40	Spitfire	10 km (6.2 mi) west of Ostend	72	17 May 1942	11:35	Spitfire	Guînes/Audembert
61	28 March 1942	18:50	Spitfire	Cap Gris-Nez/Cap Blanc-Nez	73	1 June 1942	13:45	Spitfire	5 km (3.1 mi) west of Blankenberge
62	4 April 1942	14:15	Spitfire	Calais/Dover	74	22 June 1942	12:15	Spitfire	30 km (19 mi) north of Gravelines
—	12 April 1942	13:20	Spitfire	west of Boulogne	75	15 July 1942	15:38	Spitfire	8 km (5.0 mi) northeast of Dover
63	12 April 1942	13:45? (Note: According to Mathews and Foreman claimed at 13:50.)	Spitfire	north of Gravelines	—	30 July 1942	19:00	Spitfire	Gravelines
64	16 April 1942	18:26	Spitfire	5 km (3.1 mi) north of Calais	76	21 August 1942	11:10	Spitfire	50 km (31 mi) north of Gravelines
65	25 April 1942	16:54	Spitfire	10 km (6.2 mi) west of Saint-Étienne	77	29 August 1942	11:46	Spitfire	15 km (9.3 mi) northwest of Cap Gris-Nez
66	27 April 1942	12:25	Spitfire	south of Ardres	78	9 October 1942	10:40	B-24	Lille southwest of Roubaix/Wevelgem
67	27 April 1942	12:30	Spitfire	15 km (9.3 mi) northwest of Gravelines	79	4 December 1942	14:40	Spitfire	20 km (12 mi) southeast of Dover
68	28 April 1942	11:55	Spitfire	Gravelines	80	6 December 1942	12:10	Spitfire	6 km (3.7 mi) south of Lille
69	1 May 1942	19:30	Spitfire	5 km (3.1 mi) north of Calais	81	20 December 1942	12:01? (Note: According to Mathews and Foreman claimed at 12:02.)	B-17	Seine Bend, northwest of Paris
70	5 May 1942	15:40? (Note: According to Mathews and Foreman claimed at 15:45.)	Spitfire	11 km (6.8 mi) south of Ypres					
– Stab of Jagdgeschwader 26 "Schlageter" – On the Western Front — 1 January – 31 December 1943
82	20 January 1943	12:36? (Note: According to Mathews and Foreman claimed at 12:38.)	Spitfire	north of Canterbury	89	10 June 1943	18:55	Ventura	west of Koksijde
83	8 March 1943	14:15	Spitfire	8 km (5.0 mi) northwest of Saint-Valery-en-Caux	90	22 June 1943	09:32	B-17	Terneuzen
84	5 April 1943	15:12? (Note: According to Mathews and Foreman claimed at 19:12.)	B-17	20 km (12 mi) west of Ostend	91	26 June 1943	18:54	B-17	Dieppe/Le Tréport
85	4 May 1943	18:43? (Note: According to Mathews and Foreman claimed at 18:42.)	Spitfire	northwest of Antwerp	92	17 August 1943	17:45	B-17	PQ 05 Ost ML-7 north of Liège
86	13 May 1943	16:24	B-17	5 km (3.1 mi) east of Boulogne	93	19 August 1943	19:00	B-17	Vlissingen vicinity of the Gilze-Rijen airfield
87	13 May 1943	16:46? (Note: According to Mathews and Foreman claimed at 16:48.)	Spitfire	5 km (3.1 mi) northwest of Étaples	94	21 September 1943	10:45	B-25	north of Saint-Pol
88	16 May 1943	13:16? (Note: According to Mathews and Foreman claimed at 13:12.)	P-47	Knokke/Westkapelle	95? (Note: According to Mathews and Foreman this claim is unconfirmed.)	20 October 1943	13:45	B-17*	Arras/Cambrai
– Stab of Jagdgeschwader 26 "Schlageter" – On the Western Front — 1 January – 31 December 1944
96	13 April 1944	17:10? (Note: According to Mathews and Foreman claimed at 17:15.)	B-17	Poperinge/north of Saint-Omer	99	11 June 1944	15:35	P-38	northwest of Compiègne
—	13 April 1944	—	B-17		100	15 June 1944	07:10	B-24	west of Dreux/southwest of Chartres
97	7 June 1944	13:50	P-51	PQ 15 West TU-7/8 north of Caen	101	12 October 1944	11:25? (Note: According to Mathews and Foreman claimed at 11:23.)	P-51	south of Wunstorf
98	7 June 1944	19:00	P-47	PQ 05 Ost UC-3/6; Évreux					

=== Awards ===
- Wound Badge in Black
- Front Flying Clasp of the Luftwaffe for Fighter Pilots in Gold with Pennant "300"
- Combined Pilots-Observation Badge
- Iron Cross (1939)
  - 2nd Class (30 May 1940)
  - 1st Class (10 July 1940)
- German Cross in Gold on 9 December 1941 as Oberleutnant in the 6./Jagdgeschwader 51
- Knight's Cross of the Iron Cross with Oak Leaves and Swords
  - Knight's Cross on 19 October 1940 as Oberleutnant and Staffelkapitän of the 6./Jagdgeschwader 51
  - 28th Oak leaves on 20 July 1941 as Oberleutnant and Staffelkapitän of the 1./Jagdgeschwader 26 "Schlageter"
  - 73rd Swords on 2 July 1944 as Oberstleutnant and Geschwaderkommodore of Jagdgeschwader 26 "Schlageter"

=== Dates of rank ===
1 April 1937:	Leutnant (second lieutenant)
1 September 1939:	Oberleutnant (first lieutenant)
July 1941:	Hauptmann (captain)
1 January 1943:	Major (major)
1 January 1944:	Oberstleutnant (lieutenant colonel)
1 January 1945:	Oberst (colonel)

== Publications ==
- Geschichte eines Jagdgeschwaders. Das JG 26 (Schlageter) von 1937 bis 1945 [History of a Fighter Wing. The JG 26 (Schlageter) from 1937 to 1945] (in German). Heidelberg, Germany: Kurt Vowinckel Verlag. 1956. ISBN 978-3-87943-712-2.

== Notes ==
Military offices
Preceded by Oberstleutnant Karl Vieck	Commander of Jagdfliegerführer 2; 11 January 1943 – 6 September 1943	Succeeded by Oberstleutnant Johann Schalk
Preceded by Oberstleutnant Walter Oesau	Commander of Jagdfliegerführer 4; 6 September 1943 – 1 April 1944	Succeeded by Oberst Hilmer von Bülow-Bothkamp
Preceded by Major Gerhard Schöpfel	Commander of Jagdgeschwader 26 Schlageter; 10 January 1943 – 27 January 1945	Succeeded by Major Franz Götz
