= Spezi =

German soft drink brand

- Logo of Riegele Spezi

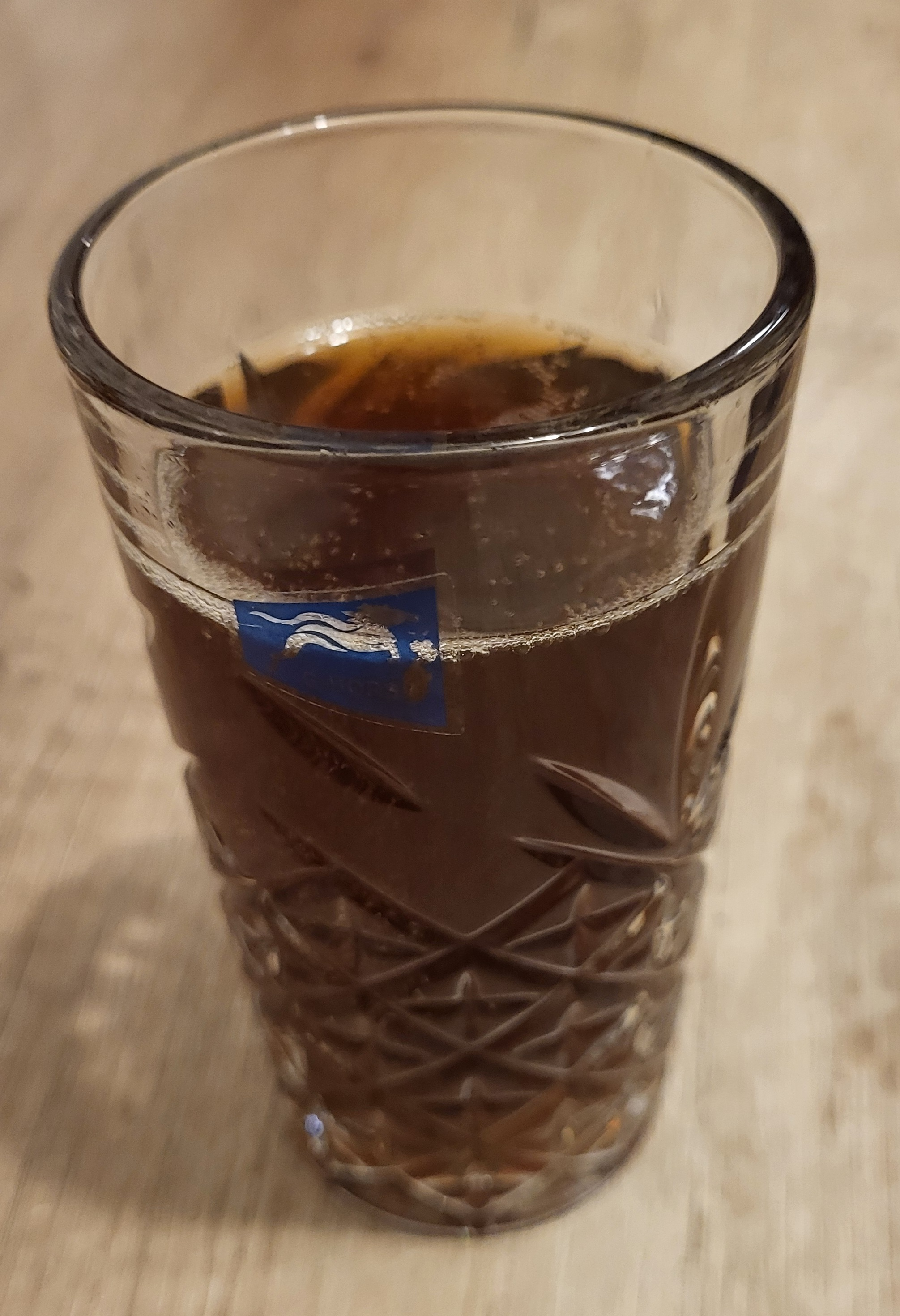
- Spezi in a glass
- Type: Mixture of cola and orange soda
- Manufacturer: Riegele; Krombacher; Paulaner; Traunstein; The Coca-Cola Company (Mezzo Mix); Almdudler; PepsiCo (Schwip Schwap); Müllerbräu; Nordbräu Ingolstadt; Schweiger; Diocesan Brewery in Bavaria; Wildbräu Grafing
- Origin: Germany, Augsburg, Bavaria, Germany
- Introduced: 1965; 61 years ago as Kola-Misch
- Color: Caramel E-150d
- Related products: Mezzo Mix; Cola; Fanta; Orange soda
- Website: spezi.com

Spezi (German pronunciation: [ˈʃpeːtsi]) is the brand name for a soft drink first produced by Riegele in Augsburg, Germany. Krombacher and Paulaner also sell their own Spezi variants under a licensing agreement with Riegele.

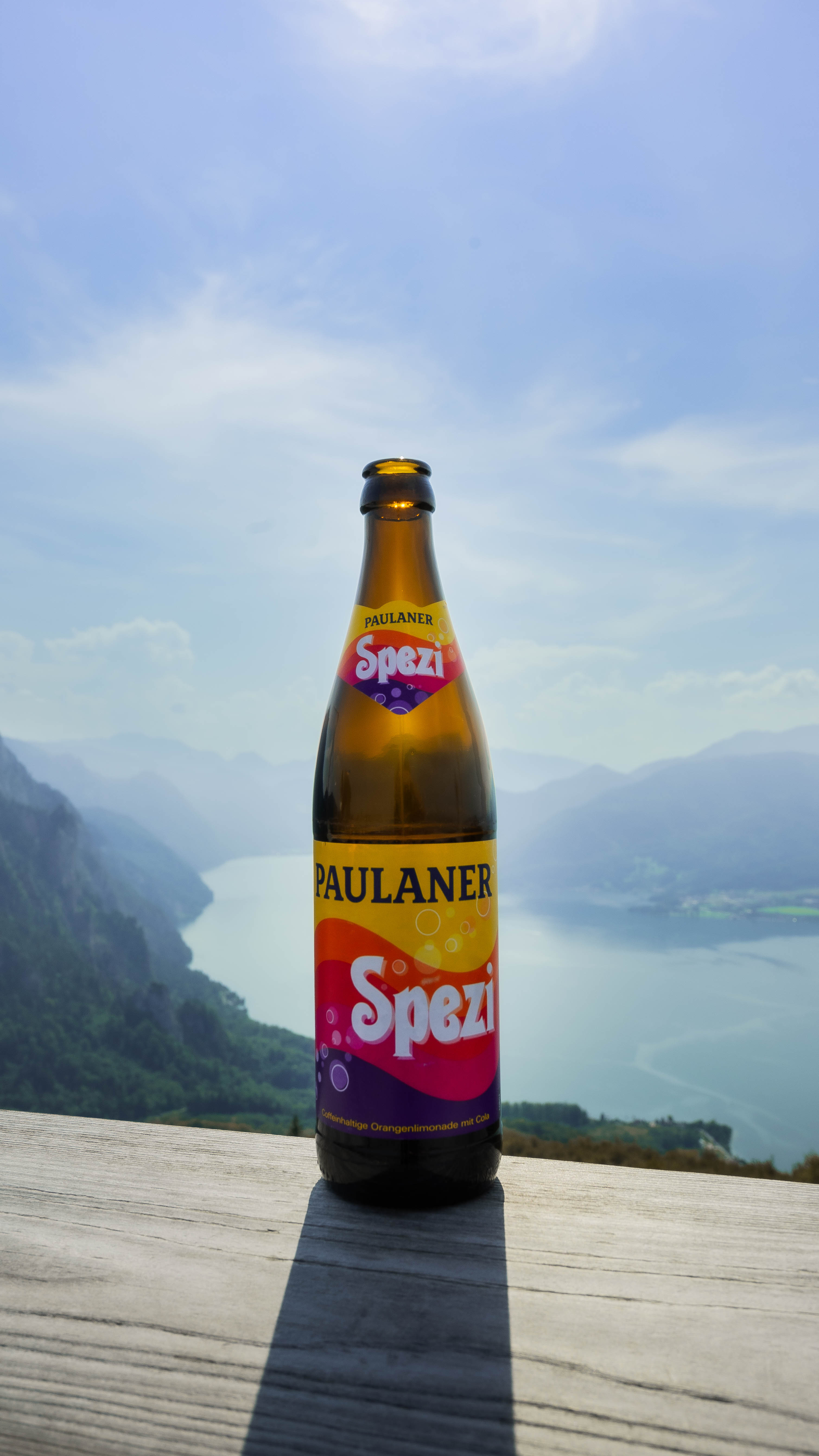
Paulaner Spezi in a bottle

== History ==
When the brand was registered in 1956, Riegele at first sold beer under the trademark. However, in 1965, Riegele brought out the special mixture of cola and orange soda KM (for Kola-Misch, translated Cola-Mix in German). Since 1977, Spezi has been produced and bottled by different local breweries under a franchising agreement. The first TV commercial for Spezi aired in 1989.

Paulaner also sells Spezi, based on an agreement with Riegele from 1974 that a German court declared still valid in 2022. The same product is available in the United States under the name Paulaner Sunset since 2024.

In 2018, Almdudler acquired the rights to the Spezi brand in Austria. PepsiCo also sells a mixture of cola and orange soda in Germany, Austria and Switzerland called Schwip Schwap and The Coca-Cola Company has also been producing a mixture of cola and orange soda in Germany since 1973 called Mezzo Mix. Mezzo Mix is also sold under other names in Spain, Belgium, Sweden and the United Kingdom. Most grocery store chains sell generic brand versions of the drink, usually called Cola-Mix.

== Ingredients ==
Spezi contains water, glucose-fructose syrup, sugar, orange juice concentrate (2.3%), lemon juice from lemon juice concentrate (0.8%), carbon dioxide, caramel color, phosphoric acid and citric acid, natural flavoring, caffeine, citrus extract, locust bean gum (stabilizer). There are also different versions, including a sugar- free type.

Taste

Spezi has a soft flavor of a taste slightly less strong of ginger ale and coca cola.
