= Erich Mix =

German flying ace (1898–1971)

- Born: 27 June 1898
- Died: 9 April 1971 (aged 72)
- Military career
- Allegiance: German Empire (to 1918); Nazi Germany
- Branch: Luftstreitkräfte; Luftwaffe
- Rank: Oberst
- Conflicts: World War I World War II
- Awards: German Cross in Gold
- Other work: Mayor of Wiesbaden

Erich Mix (27 June 1898 in Labuhnken (now Trzcińsk, Poland) in West Prussia (now Starogard Gdański) – 9 April 1971 in Wiesbaden) was a German flying ace during World War II, a politician, a member of the Nazi Party, and later a member of the Free Democratic Party.

== Biography ==
Mix fought as an infantryman in World War I before he trained as a fighter pilot and posted to Jagdstaffel 54, where, as an Unteroffizer from June 1918 until the end of the war, he scored three aerial victories (and one unconfirmed balloon) of Jasta 54's total of 22 victories, for which he was awarded both classes of the Iron Cross.

After the war, he studied law at the University of Greifswald and made a career as a leading administrative official. In 1934, he became Mayor of Tilsit (now Sovetsk, Russia) in 1934-37, later of Wiesbaden in 1937-45 and 1954-60. In his first term as mayor of Wiesbaden, most of the Jewish community of Wiesbaden, some 2,700 people in 1933, were murdered and their synagogues were burned, under Mix's leadership. (However, he was again elected mayor in 1954, and he was buried in the honorary section of the Wiesbaden graveyard till 2014.)

In 1935, he started flying again, training as an observer and then as a fighter pilot in 1937.

Serving as technical officer with I./JG 53 at the outbreak of World War II, Mix claimed three French Morane fighters over Saargemünd (now Sarreguemines, France) on 21 September 1939, and four more on 22 November 1939 over Saarbrücken. Appointed to command III./JG 2 in March 1940, he claimed three more Moranes on 21 May 1940, although Mix was shot down and forced to land in a field near Roye on 21 May in Bf 109E-3 W.Nr.1526. After being hospitalized, Mix returned to III./JG 2 on 19 June. He left France with his unit and relocated to Frankfurt/Rhein-Main on 1 July. On 27 July, the unit returned to Évreux-West until 4 August. Mix claimed a Hawker Hurricane on 4 September. Mix remained Gruppenkommandeur of III./JG 2 until 24 September 1940, when he became one of the older commanders dismissed by a frustrated Goering in favour of the younger, up-and-coming aces of 1940; in Mix's case, Hpt. Otto Bertram. Mix's final claim was a Bristol Blenheim over The Hague (Den Haag) in July 1941, while commanding JG 1. He later served as Jafü Bretagne (Fighter Leader, Brittany) from April 1943 onwards. During World War II, he claimed eight (potentially 13) aerial victories.

== Bibliography ==
- Cony, Christophe & Martin, Pierre (May 1999). "D'une guerre à l'autre: Erich Mix" [From One War to Another: Erich Mix]. Avions: Toute l'aéronautique et son histoire (in French) (74): 38–41. ISSN 1243-8650.
- Prien, Jochen (1997). Jagdgeschwader 53 A History of the "Pik As" Geschwader March 1937 - May 1942. Atglen, Pennsylvania: Schiffer Publishing. ISBN 0-7643-0175-6.

Government offices
Preceded by Hans Heinrich Redlhammer	Mayor of Wiesbaden; February 25, 1954 – February 25, 1960	Succeeded by Georg Buch
Military offices
Preceded by Major Erich von Selle	Commander of Jagdgeschwader 1 Oesau; August, 1942 – March 31, 1943	Succeeded by Oberstleutnant Hans Philipp
Preceded by Oberstleutnant Walter Oesau	Commander of Jagdfliegerführer Bretagne; December 1, 1943 – August 31, 1944	Succeeded by disbanded
