= Theo Osterkamp =

German fighter pilot

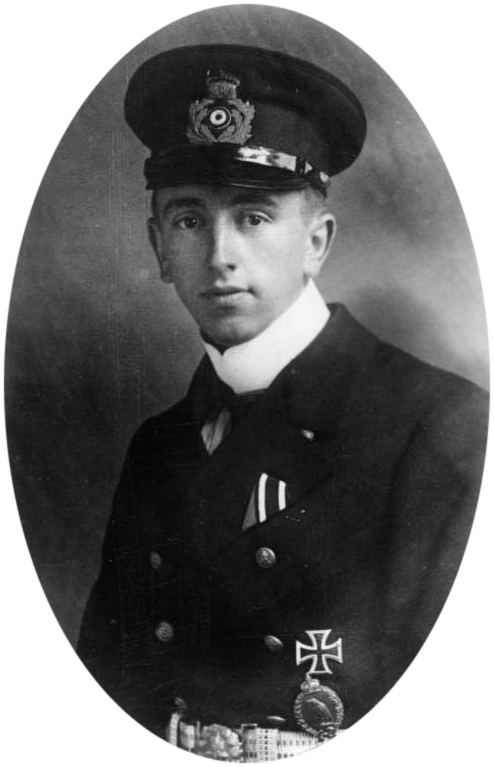
- Osterkamp in 1918
- Born: Paul Louis Theodor Osterkamp; 15 April 1892; Düren, Rhine Province, Kingdom of Prussia, German Empire
- Died: 2 January 1975 (aged 82); Baden-Baden, Baden-Württemberg, West Germany
- Military career
- Allegiance: German Empire; Weimar Republic; Nazi Germany
- Branch: Imperial German Navy; Luftwaffe
- Service years: 1914–1944
- Rank: Generalleutnant (major general)
- Nickname: Onkel (Uncle)
- Commands: JG 51
- Conflicts: World War I World War II: Battle of France Battle of Britain
- Awards: House Order of Hohenzollern; Pour le Mérite; Knight's Cross of the Iron Cross

Theodor "Theo" Osterkamp (15 April 1892 – 2 January 1975) was a German fighter pilot during World War I and World War II. A flying ace, he achieved 32 victories in World War I. In World War II, he led Jagdgeschwader 51 up to the Battle of Britain and claimed a further six victories during World War II, in the process becoming one of only a few men to score victories and become an ace in both world wars.

== Early life and World War I ==
Osterkamp was born in Rölsdorf near Düren, West Germany, and grew up in Aschersleben, modern day Saxony-Anhalt. He was born in 1892 as the second son of the factory owner Hermann Osterkamp and Anna Wilhelmine née Blank. Osterkamp received his Abitur from the Gymnasium in Dessau. His schoolmates in Dessau included the future pilots Oswald Boelcke and Gotthard Sachsenberg.

When the First World War started he was studying forestry but decided to enlist in the German Army. He was rejected for service due to his "slight build" and he instead enlisted in the Marinefliegerkorps in August 1914. He then flew with the 2. Marine-Fliegerabteilung in Flanders. During 1915–1916, he served as an air observer, and became the first German pilot to fly a land-based aircraft to England on a reconnaissance-mission. Osterkamp claimed his first (but unconfirmed) kill on 6 September 1916 as an observer to pilot Leutnant zur See Wilhelm Mattheus in a LVG C.II two-seater aircraft. In March 1917, he joined the Kampffliegerschule (Combat pilot school) in Putzig and then joined Marine Feld Jagdstaffel 1 on the 14th of April 1917 On 21 March 1917, Leutnant Osterkamp took command of Marine Feld Jagdstaffel 2 He scored a total of 32 victories during the war, and was awarded the Prussian military order Pour le Mérite on 2 September 1918, and was one of the last individuals to receive it.

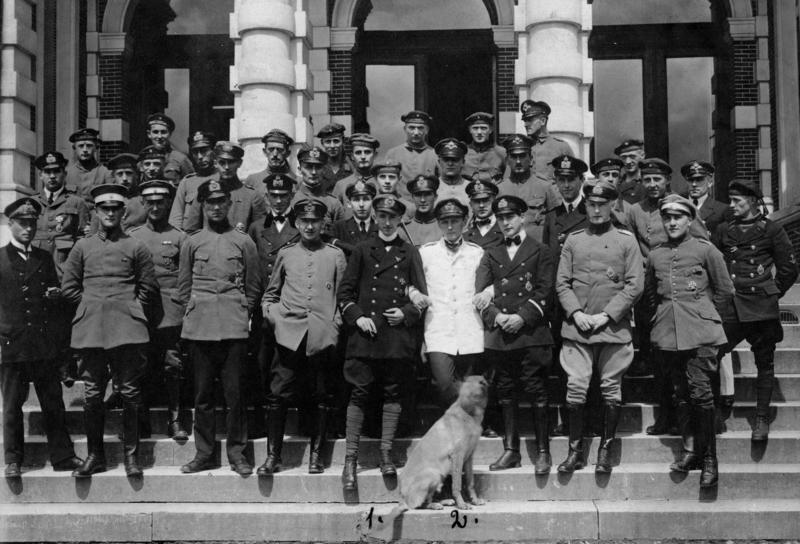
September 1918 1) Theodor Osterkamp 2) Gotthard Sachsenberg.

== Interwar years ==
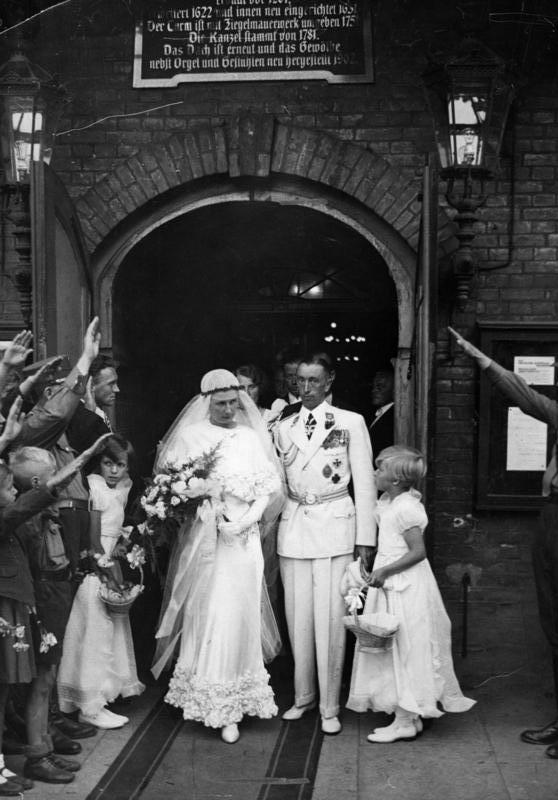
1933, Wedding of Theodor Osterkamp with Fel Gudrun Pagge in Eppendorf, Hamburg.

Osterkamp joined the new Luftwaffe on 1 August 1933 with the rank of Hauptmann. He also participated in the second, third and fourth FAI International Tourist Plane Contest Challenge 1930 (11th place), Challenge 1932 (12th place) and Challenge 1934 (5th place). On 1 April 1935, Osterkamp was appointed Staffelkapitän (squadron leader) of 4. Staffel (4th squadron) of Jagdgeschwader 132 "Richthofen" (JG 132—132nd Fighter Wing), the first commander of this newly created Staffel. On 15 March 1936, Osterkamp transferred command of 4. Staffel to Hauptmann Clemens Graf von Schönborn-Wiesentheid. Osterkamp was then appointed Gruppenkommandeur (group commander) of II. Gruppe of Jagdgeschwader 134 "Horst Wessel" (JG 134—134th Fighter Wing). He held this position until November 1937 when he was transferred to the Jagdfliegerschule Werneuchen, later (JFS 1).

== World War II ==
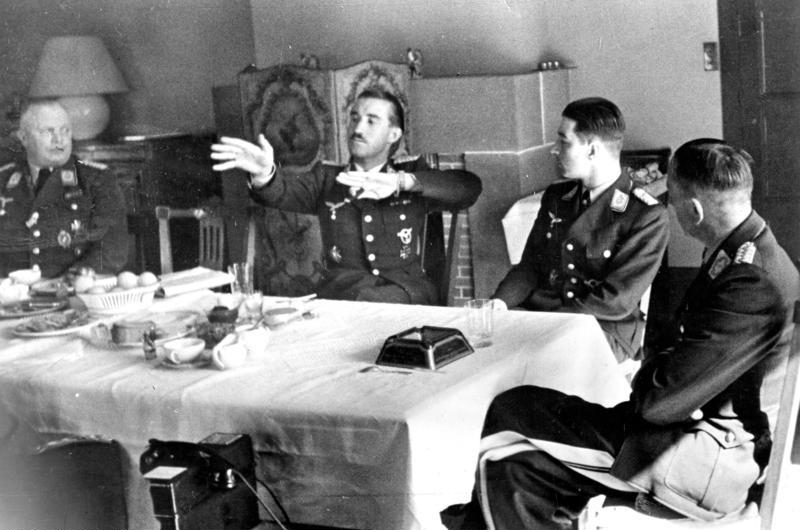
Adolf Galland and Werner Mölders attending Theo Osterkamp's birthday on 15 April 1941.

World War II in Europe began on Friday 1 September 1939 when German forces invaded Poland. On 19 September, Oberst Osterkamp was appointed Geschwaderkommodore of Jagdgeschwader 51 (JG 51—51st Fighter Wing). During the Battle of France, he claimed four victories. During the Kanalkampf period of the Battle of Britain in July 1940, he claimed a further two victories, (a Bristol Blenheim on 1 June and a Spitfire on 13 July 1940) bringing his total to six. He was replaced as commander of JG 51 by Werner Mölders on 23 July with the latter formally taking command on the 27 July. Promoted to Generalmajor, Osterkamp was awarded his Knight's Cross of the Iron Cross on 22 August 1940. Following his replacement in JG 51, Osterkamp was appointed Jagdfliegerführer 2, the commander of fighter aircraft in Luftflotte 2. (Note: For an explanation of Luftwaffe unit designations see Organisation of the Luftwaffe during World War II.)

On 1 August 1942, he was transferred to Luftgaustab z.b.V. Afrika. On 5 April 1943, he was appointed Jagdfliegerführer Sizilien and served until replaced on 15 June by Adolf Galland. He then served in a number of staff positions until being appointed Inspekteur der Luftwaffen-Bodenorganisation (Inspector of Luftwaffe ground organisation) in 1944. His criticism of the Oberkommando der Luftwaffe (Luftwaffe High Command) led to his dismissal from service in December 1944.

== Post-war career ==
In 1960, he was appointed honorary chairman of the Gemeinschaft der Jagdflieger, the Association of Fighter Pilots.

== Summary of career ==
=== Aerial victory claims ===
Mathews and Foreman, authors of Luftwaffe Aces — Biographies and Victory Claims, researched the German Federal Archives and found records for 31 aerial victory claims, plus six further unconfirmed claims during World War I and three further unconfirmed claims during World War II. This number includes 29 claims during the World War I and two on the Western Front of World War II.

Chronicle of aerial victories
This and the – (dash) indicates unconfirmed aerial victory claims for which Osterkamp did not receive credit. This and the ? (question mark) indicates information discrepancies listed by Prien, Stemmer, Rodeike, Bock, Mathews and Foreman.
Claim	Date	Time	Type	Location	Claim	Date	Time	Type	Location
World War I
– Marine Feld Jagdstaffel 1 – April – September 1917
1	30 April 1917	—	Nieuport	Oostkerke	4	11 July 1917	21:45	Sopwith 1½ Strutter	north of Veurne
2	12 May 1917	—	Sopwith Triplane	Ostend	5	12 July 1917	21:00	Royal Aircraft Factory S.E.5	Zandvoorde
3	5 June 1917	—	Sopwith Camel	Nieuwpoort	6	24 September 1917	—	SPAD S.VII	west of Westrozebeke
– Marine Feld Jagdstaffel 2 – March – September 1918
7	16 March 1918	15:55	Sopwith Camel	3 km (1.9 mi) south of Pervijze	20	12 August 1918	20:50	Sopwith Camel	Ramskapelle
8	26 March 1918	—	Sopwith Camel	Avekapelle	—	12 August 1918	20:50	Sopwith Camel	Diksmuide
9	23 April 1918	—	Sopwith Camel	north of Ostend	—	12 August 1918	21:00	Martinsyde G.100	north of Oostkerke
10	25 April 1918	—	SPAD S.VII	Pervijze	—	15 August 1918	—	Martinsyde G.100	Ostend
11	11 May 1918	17:02	Sopwith Camel	over sear near Bredene	21	16 August 1918	—	Airco DH.9	Blankenberge
—	5 June 1918	—	SPAD S.VII	Pervijze	22	21 August 1918	14:00	Airco DH.9	over sea near Bredene
12	7 June 1918	13:10	Sopwith Camel	Ramskapelle	23	23 August 1918	12:10	Sopwith Camel	Pervijze
13	12 June 1918	11:50	Airco DH.4	southwest of Pervijze	—	30 August 1918	14:40	Airco DH.9	Ostend
—	12 June 1918	—	Sopwith Camel	De Panne	24	16 September 1918	—	Sopwith Camel	Koksijde
14	27 June 1918	—	Sopwith Camel	over sea near Wenduine	25	16 September 1918	—	Sopwith Camel	Koksijde
15	28 June 1918	20:55	Sopwith Camel	southwest of Lake Blankaart	26	20 September 1918	—	Sopwith Camel	Praatbos
16	29 June 1918	—	Bristol F.2 Fighter	southeast of Pervijze	27	28 September 1918	12:30	Sopwith Camel	Woumen
17	20 July 1918	10:25	Sopwith Camel	east of Nieuport	28	28 September 1918	18:10	Bréguet 14	Pierkenshoek
18	25 July 1918	20:53	Sopwith Camel	south of Nieuwpoort	29	29 September 1918	—	Bréguet 14	west of Zarren
19	29 July 1918	—	Airco DH.4	south of Oudekapelle					
World War II
– Stab of Jagdgeschwader 51 – Battle of France — 10 May – 25 June 1940
1	12 May 1940	—	Fokker G.I	Soesterberg	—	31 May 1940	—	Hawker Hurricane	Dunkirk
—	22 May 1940	—	Hawker Hurricane	Roubaix	—	1 June 1940	—	Bristol Blenheim? (Note: According to Mathews and Foreman claimed as a Hawker Hurricane.)	Dunkirk
– Stab of Jagdgeschwader 51 – At the Channel and over England — 26 June – 23 July 1940
2	13 July 1940	—	Supermarine Spitfire	Dover					

=== Awards and decorations ===
- Kingdom of Prussia:
  - Iron Cross 2nd Class & 1st Class
  - Royal House Order of Hohenzollern, Knight's Cross with Swords
  - Pour le Mérite (2 September 1918)
- German Empire: Imperial Navy Pilot’s Badge
- Weimar Republic: Baltic Cross
- Duchy of Anhalt:
  - House Order of Albert the Bear, Knight's Badge 2nd Class with Swords
  - Friedrich Cross
- Free and Hanseatic City of Hamburg: Hanseatic Cross
- Grand Duchy of Oldenburg: Friedrich August Cross 2nd Class & 1st Class
- Austria-Hungary: Military Merit Cross, 3rd Class with War Decoration
- Nazi Germany:
  - Honour Cross of the World War 1914/1918 for Combatants
  - Combined Pilot/Observer Badge
  - Wehrmacht Long Service Award (Luftwaffe) 4th Class
  - 1939 Clasp to the Iron Cross 2nd Class & 1st Class
  - Knight's Cross of the Iron Cross on 22 August 1940 as Generalmajor and Jagdfliegerführer of Luftflotte 2 (Note: According to Scherzer as Jagdfliegerführer 1 for his achievements as Geschwaderkommodore of Jagdgeschwader 51.)

== Publications ==
- Du oder Ich. Deutsche Jagdflieger in Höhen und Tiefen [You or I. German Fighter Pilots at High and Low Altitude] (in German). Berlin: Nauck. 1938. OCLC 935029409.

== Notes ==
Military offices
Preceded by none	Commander of Jagdgeschwader 51 Mölders; 25 November 1939 – 23 July 1940	Succeeded by Major Werner Mölders
Preceded by unknown	Commander of Jagdfliegerführer 1; 22 July 1940 – 1 January 1941	Succeeded by unknown
Preceded by Generalmajor Kurt-Bertram von Döring	Commander of Jagdfliegerführer 2; 1 December 1940 – 1 August 1941	Succeeded by Oberst Joachim-Friedrich Huth
Preceded by General Stefan Fröhlich	Acting Commander of Fliegerführer Afrika; April 1942 – 12 April 1942	Succeeded by General Otto Hoffmann von Waldau
Preceded by none	Commander of Jagdfliegerführer Sizilien; 5 April 1943 – 15 June 1943	Succeeded by Generalleutnant Adolf Galland
