= Jagdfliegerführer 4 =

- Disbanded: 31 August 1944
- Country: Nazi Germany
- Branch: Luftwaffe
- Type: Fighter Command
- Role: Air defense

Jagdfliegerführer 4 was formed April 1, 1943 in Rennes subordinated to the Luftflotte 3. On September 6, 1943 the unit redesignated Jagdfliegerführer Bretagne and reformed again on September 6, 1943 in Saint-Pol-Brias from Jagdfliegerführer 2, subordinated to 4. Jagd-Division. The headquarters was located at Rennes and from 6 September 1943 in Saint-Pol-Brias. The unit was disbanded on August 31, 1944

== Commanding officers ==
=== Fliegerführer ===
- Oberstleutnant Walter Oesau, 1 July 1943 - 6 September 1943
- Oberst Josef Priller, 6 September 1943 - 1 April 1944
- Oberst Hilmer von Bülow-Bothkamp, 1 April 1944 - 31 August 1944
