= Mezzo Mix =

Beverage by the Coca-Cola Company

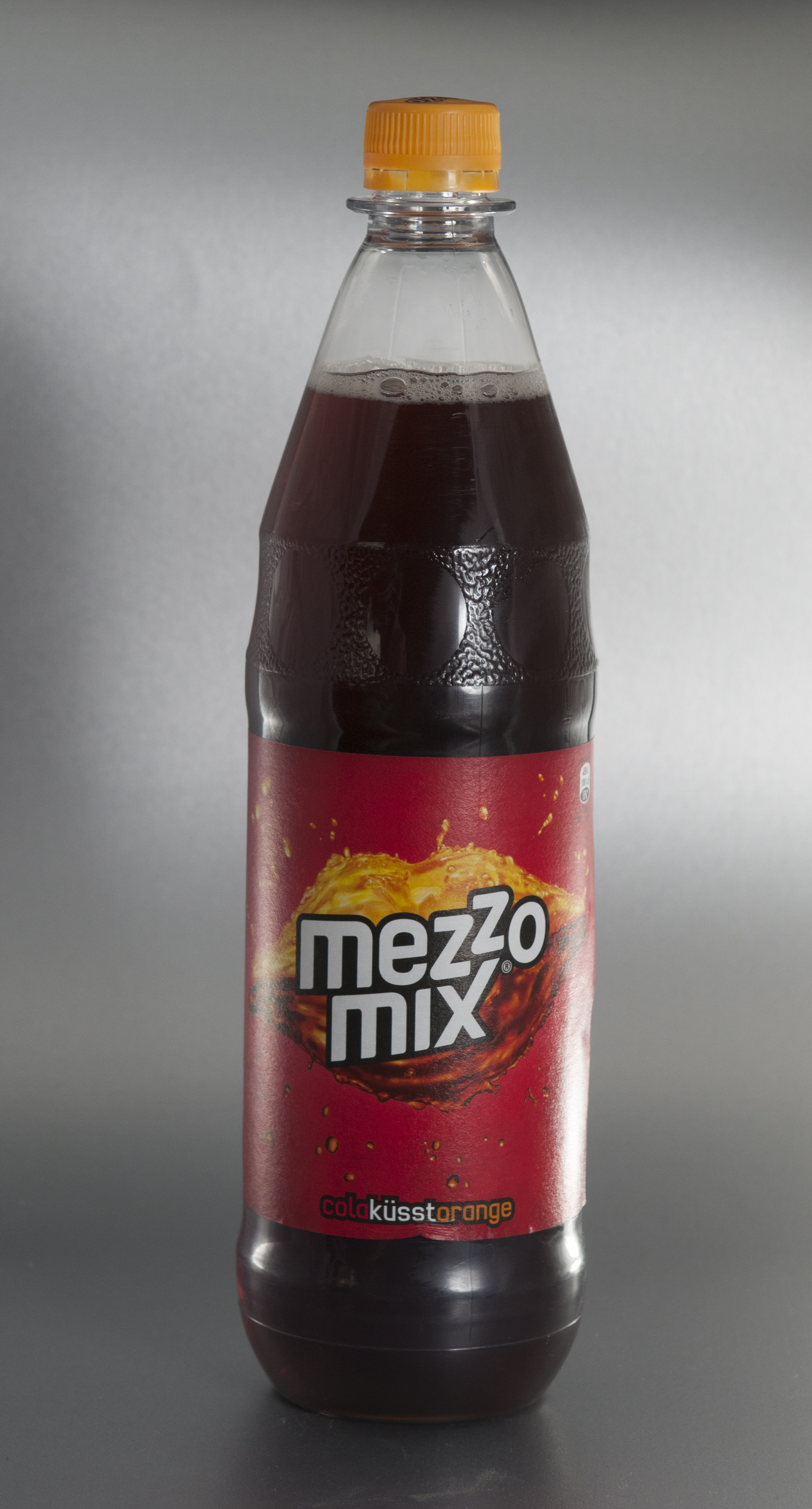
- Mezzo Mix in a bottle
- Type: Mixture of cola and orange soda (Spezi)
- Manufacturer: The Coca-Cola Company
- Origin: Germany
- Introduced: 1973; 53 years ago
- Colour: Caramel E-150d
- Related products: Spezi
- Website: Mezzo Mix website

Mezzo Mix (stylised mezzo mix) is a product of The Coca-Cola Company, first introduced in West Germany in 1973. It is a mixture of orange soda and cola, a beverage popular in German-speaking countries, commonly known there as spezi, the generic trademark of the first brand of that type of soda.

== Market ==
Mezzo Mix is sold and produced officially only in Germany, Switzerland and Austria, but there have been cases that the beverage is visible in Belgium as well. The brand's slogan translates into English as "Cola Kisses Orange". In Spain it is called Fanta Mezzo Mix Naranja & Cola. In Sweden it is called Fanta Mezzo and was released in late January 2017 as a limited edition, connected to the music event called Melodifestivalen (Swedish qualifications to Eurovision Song Contest).

Until 2013, Mezzo Mix was one of eight international soda flavours featured and available for tasting at Club Cool in Epcot. In approximately 2020 Mezzo Mix was back at Epcot. Mezzo Mix was later introduced in Great Britain in 2019, as a selection for the Coca-Cola Freestyle machine.

== Varieties ==
| Name | Year launched | Notes | Ref. |
|---|---|---|---|
| Mezzo Mix (Original) | 1973 | The original variety. A Cola/Orange soda hybrid drink. | |
| Mezzo Mix Zitron | 1990s | A Lemon-flavoured variety. It was rather unpopular with consumers and was discontinued in the early 2000s. | |
| Mezzo Mix Zero | 2007 | A version of the original Mezzo Mix containing no sugar or calories. | |
| Mezzo Mix Berry Love | 2014 | A Raspberry-flavoured variant, sold as a limited edition for Valentine's Day in 2014 and 2015. It returned to store shelves in 2024 and 2025. | |
| Mezzo Mix Himbeer Romanze | 2026 | An Raspberry and Apple variant. Much like Berry Love, it was sold as a limited edition for Valentine's Day in 2026. Unlike the other Mezzo Mix variants, it has a lower sugar amount and Acesulfame K as a sweetener. | |

== Ingredients ==
=== Orange ===
Ingredients: (since 2021) water, sugar, fructose, orange juice from orange juice concentrate (1,5%), carbonic acid, caramel coloring, acidifiers (citric acid, malic acid), flavoring, caffeine, stabilizer

=== Zero Orange ===
Ingredients: water, orange juice from orange juice concentrate (1,5%), carbon dioxide, acidifier citric acid, caramel coloring, acidity regulator, sodium citrates, sweeteners (acesulfame K, aspartame), flavoring, caffeine, stabilizer

=== Berry Love ===
Ingredients: water, sugar, redcurrant juice from redcurrant juice concentrate (0,7%), carbonic acid, raspberry juice from raspberry juice concentrate (0,3%), acidifier citric acid, caramel coloring, flavoring, caffeine

== See also ==
- Spezi
- Fanta
- Coca-Cola Orange
