= Walter Oesau =

German World War II flying ace and wing commander

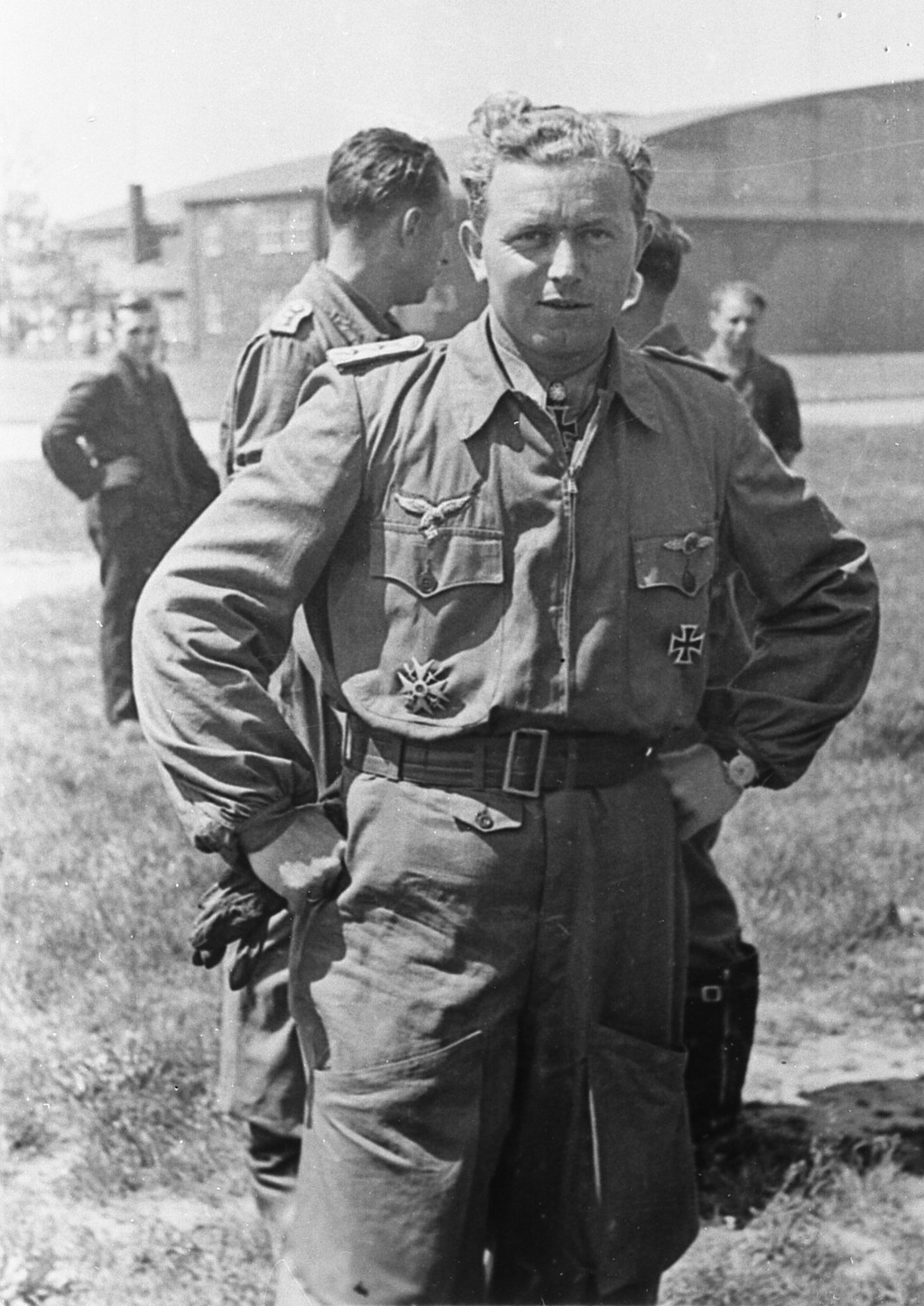
- Walter Oesau ca. 1941
- Born: 28 June 1913; Farnewinkel, Kingdom of Prussia, German Empire
- Died: 11 May 1944 (aged 30) near St. Vith, German-occupied Belgium
- Cause of death: Killed in action
- Burial place: Friedhof Meldorf Meldorf, Germany
- Military career
- Allegiance: Nazi Germany
- Branch: Luftwaffe
- Service years: 1933–1944
- Rank: Oberst (colonel)
- Nickname: "Gulle"
- Units: Condor Legion, JG 1, JG 2, JG 51, Jagdgruppe 88
- Commands: III./JG 3, III./JG 51, JG 2, Jagdfliegerführer Bretagne, JG 1.
- Conflicts: See battles Spanish Civil War World War II: Battle of France; Battle of Britain; Operation Barbarossa; Defence of the Reich †
- Awards: Spanish Cross in Gold with Swords and Diamonds; Knight's Cross of the Iron Cross with Oak Leaves and Swords

Walter "Gulle" Oesau (28 June 1913 – 11 May 1944) was a German fighter pilot during World War II. A fighter ace, he served in the Luftwaffe from 1934 until his death in 1944. He rose to command Jagdgeschwader 1, which was named in his honor after his death.

He served with the Condor Legion during the Spanish Civil War with the Jagdgruppe 88. He claimed nine aircraft during the campaign, becoming one of only 28 people to earn the award of the Spanish Cross in Gold and Diamonds.

At the start of World War II, Oesau was given command of a fighter group within Jagdgeschwader 20. The group took part in the Invasion of Poland, later moving to the Western Front as the redesignated III Gruppe, Jagdgeschwader 51. Oesau operated on both the Western and Eastern Fronts.

He returned to operations as commander of Jagdgeschwader 1. He was killed in action on 11 May 1944 aged 30. JG 1 was given the name "Oesau" in his honor.

== Early life ==
Walter "Gulle" Oesau was born to a bank director in Farnewinkel near Meldorf, Germany on 28 June 1913. He joined the German Army (Heer) in October 1933 and served in the Second Artillery Regiment as an enlisted soldier. After being transferred to a Luftwaffe transport unit, he undertook flying training in 1934 as a cadet (Fahnenjunker) at the Luftwaffe Academy (Deutsche Verkehrsfliegerschule) in Hanover. Upon completion of his training he was assigned to Jagdgeschwader 132, as a Leutnant. The unit was re–designated as Jagdgeschwader 2 "Richthofen" in May 1939. (Note: For an explanation of the meaning of Luftwaffe unit designation see Luftwaffe Organization)

== Combat career ==
=== Spanish Civil War ===
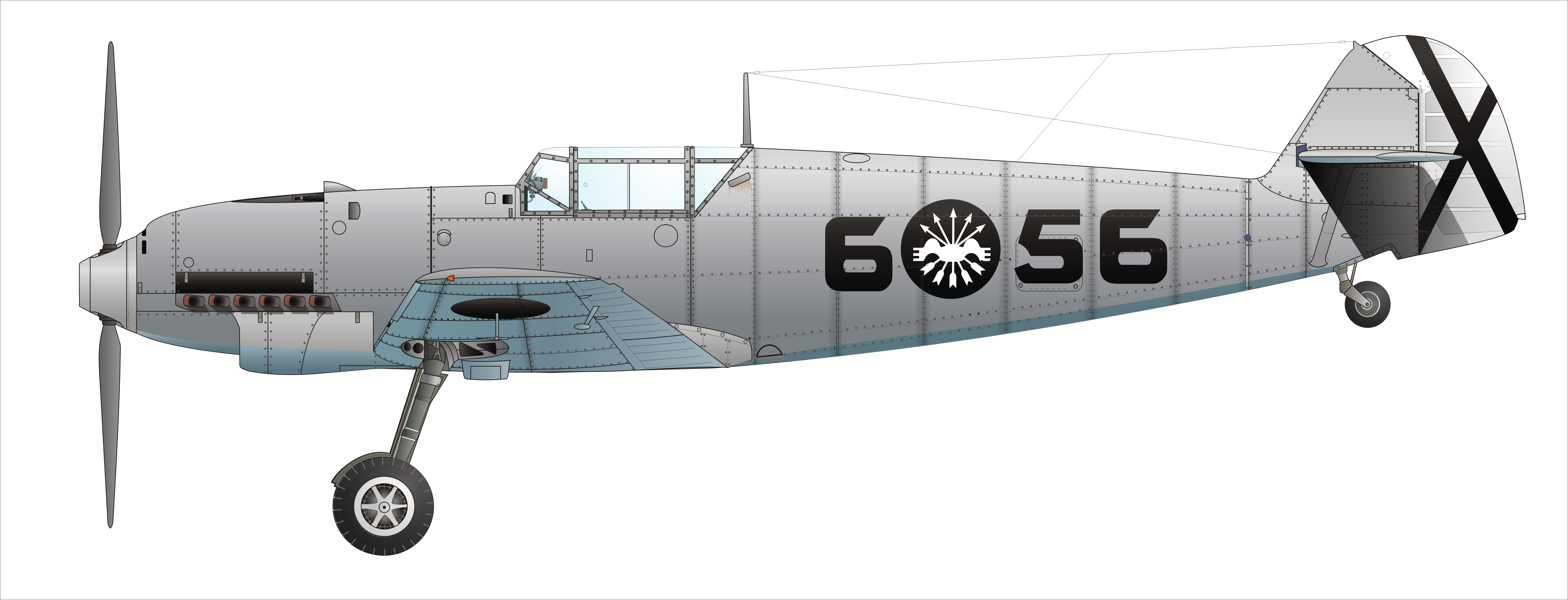
Bf 109 C–1, Similar to one flown by Oesau in the Spanish Civil War.

Oesau started his operational career with the Condor Legion, along with future contemporary aces such as Werner Mölders and Adolf Galland. He was one of the first to join 3. Jagdgruppe 88 in Spain in April 1938. (Note: Jagdgruppe 88, four squadrons equipped with the Heinkel He 51) The Staffel, commanded by Werner Mölders, took part in the Spanish Civil War where Oesau claimed nine victories, flying 130 combat missions. For this he received the Spanish Cross (Spanienkreuz) in Gold with Diamonds. He was also wounded in this conflict which earned him the Spanish Wound Badge. He also received the Medalla de la Campaña and the Medalla Militar.

=== Western Front 1939–40 ===
On 1 March 1939 Oesau joined the Headquarters Flight (Stabsschwarm) of I./JG 2. By 15 July 1939 Oesau was promoted to Oberleutnant and given command of 2./JG 20. On 15 July 1939, I./JG 20 was activated in Döberitz initially consisting of two Staffeln drawn from JG 2. Prior to the invasion of Poland I./JG 20 was transferred to Strausberg on 26 August 1939. From there, the group was transferred to Sprottau (modern Szprotawa) anticipating an attack from the Polish Air Force. A week later the group moved to Brandenburg. On 21 February 1940, the unit was relocated to Bönninghardt under the control of JG 51. It continued to operate in this fashion until the end of the Battle of France. On 4 July it was re–designated III./JG 51. Oesau served as Staffelkapitän of 7./JG 51.

==== Battle of France ====
Oesau got his first World War II victory during the Battle of France on 13 May 1940, when he claimed a French Curtiss P-36 Hawk over Halsteren in the Netherlands, earning him the Iron Cross 1st class (Eisernes Kreuz 1. Klasse). On 31 May, he claimed three Spitfires during a patrol North West of Dunkirk and next day he claimed a Bristol Blenheim. On 13 June 1940, he shot down the last French aircraft kill claimed by JG 51, a French Amiot bomber. By the end of hostilities in France on 25 June, his World War II tally stood at 5 (13 including Spanish kills).

Following the Battle of France, the Luftwaffe started its attacks on Channel convoys as a prelude to the Battle of Britain. The primary task of JG 51 during this time was to provide fighter escort to these bomber missions. The commander of JG 51, Oberst Theo Osterkamp established a policy of unrestricted combat air patrol (freie Jagd) of fighter Staffeln providing loose protection rather than close escort to the bombers, actively seeking out Royal Air Force fighters. On 7 July 1940 Oesau claimed one Spitfire.

==== Battle of Britain ====
On 10 July 1940, the first major clashes of the Battle of Britain occurred in a phase known as the Kanalkampf. 20 Bf 109s of III./JG 51 led by Hauptmann Hannes Trautloft and 30 Messerschmitt Bf 110 C of I./Zerstörergeschwader 26 escorted 20 Dornier Do 17 bombers of II./Kampfgeschwader 2 attacking a large convoy off Folkestone. Oberleutnant Oesau was leading 7./JG 51.

Trautloft noticed three of a flight of six intercepting Hurricanes of No. 32 squadron higher than the escorts, attempting to intercept the bombers. Soon they were joined by four squadrons of British fighters: No. 56 Squadron, No. 111 Squadron, No. 64 Squadron and No. 74 Squadron. Oesau was able to claim three Spitfires. Two 7./JG 51 aircraft crash landed in France. British losses show that no Spitfire was lost or destroyed in the ensuing battle. Only one No. 32 Hurricane, piloted by Pilot Officer Higgs, was destroyed in a collision with one of the Do 17s and only one other Hurricane was damaged. It is possible Oesau was responsible for damaging Higgs' Hurricane, causing him to lose control. Two Spitfires landed with light damage while a third was also slightly damaged and force-landed at RAF Manston. Over claiming of enemy losses was rife on both sides during the battle.

On 19 July, III./JG 51 were confronted by Defiants of No. 141 Squadron south of Folkestone. As the German pilots were now aware of the Defiant's lack of forward armament, they soon gained the advantage in combat and claimed 11 Defiants shot down in 8 minutes. Oesau was credited with one Defiant, taking his score to 19. He was the first one of JG 51 to reach double digits in World War II. RAF losses record six Defiants destroyed and two damaged.

On 18 August 1940, III./JG 51 escorted Dorniers attacking Hornchurch airfield. Intercepted by Hurricanes over Kent, Oesau claimed one Hurricane shot down as his 20th victory, earning him the Knight's Cross of the Iron Cross (Ritterkreuz des Eisernen Kreuzes) two days later, the first pilot of JG 51 to be thus honored. On 24 August 1940, Trautloft took over as Geschwaderkommodore of Jagdgeschwader 54, and Oesau replaced him as Gruppenkommandeur of III./JG 51 while command of 7./JG 51 went to Oberleutnant Hermann Staiger. By October 1940, Oesau had a total score of 48 (including 26 Spitfires).

On 10 November 1940, Oesau succeeded Wilhelm Balthasar as Gruppenkommandeur of III. Gruppe of Jagdgeschwader 3. In consequence, command of III. Gruppe JG 51 was handed to Hauptmann Richard Leppla. With 39 victories he was currently the 4th highest scoring fighter pilot behind Helmut Wick, Werner Mölders and Adolf Galland. On 5 February 1941, the RAF flew "Circus" No. 3 targeting the airfield at Saint-Omer. That day, Oesau shot down the Hurricane piloted by Sergeant H. D. Denchfield from No. 610 Squadron over Desvres, France. This was his 40th aerial victory. Oesau was awarded the Knight's Cross of the Iron Cross with Oak Leaves (Ritterkreuz des Eisernen Kreuzes mit Eichenlaub) next day. It also earned him a second entry in the Wehrmachtbericht. In early 1941, JG 3 returned to Germany to replace their Messerschmitt Bf 109 'Emils' with the new 'F' variant (Friedrich). However, Oesau disliked the Bf 109 F and kept flying his 'Emils' for some time. JG 3 returned to France in May 1941 and Oesau added two more kills on 16 May and 28 May bringing his total to 51.

=== Operation Barbarossa ===
The Gruppe relocated to an airfield at Moderówka on 18 June where the Gruppe concluded their last preparations for Operation Barbarossa, the German invasion of the Soviet Union on 22 June 1941. At the start of the campaign, JG 3 was subordinated to the V. Fliegerkorps (5th Air Corps), under command of General der Flieger Robert Ritter von Greim, which was part of Luftflotte 4 (4th Air Fleet), under command of Generaloberst Alexander Löhr. These air elements supported Generalfeldmarschall Gerd von Rundstedt's Heeresgruppe Süd (Army Group South), with the objective of capturing Ukraine and its capital Kiev. Oesau shot down his first Soviet aircraft on 24 June, and by 30 June 1941 had reached his 60th victory, downing a Tupolev SB bomber. Next day he downed three more SB bombers near Lvov (modern Lviv, Ukraine). This earned him his 3rd entry in the Wehrmachtbericht. On 10 July 1941, Oesau claimed 5 more aircraft and two more kills by 11 July 1941. On 12 July 1941, he shot down 7 Soviet aircraft in one sortie. In the five weeks since moving to the Eastern Front, Oesau was credited with 44 Soviet aircraft downed. He became the third pilot to reach 80 victories, the 80th kill an Ilyushin DB-3 bomber. He was awarded the Knight's Cross of the Iron Cross with Oak Leaves and Swords (Ritterkreuz des Eisernen Kreuzes mit Eichenlaub und Schwertern) on same day. He was the third person to earn the Swords. He was again then wounded, receiving heavy splinter injuries in face and knee. A fortnight later he was transferred to the Western Front to take over JG 2.

=== Defence of the Reich 1941–44 ===
He succeeded Balthasar for the second time as JG 2 commander, who had died in combat with Spitfires over northern France when he pulled the tail off his Bf 109 F in a dive. The Bf 109 F-2 proved an excellent match to the Spitfire V, but Oesau disliked its reduced armament compared to the 'Emil', and continued to fly an E-4 model in preference to the Bf 109 F, until lack of spares forced him to switch to the newer variant. Upon his appointment on 4 July 1941, he addressed JG 2 with the following words.

In the spirit of Manfred von Richthofen, and following the example set by my predecessors, Major Wick and Hauptmann Balthasar, constant readiness and devotion to duty will enable us to achieve yet further successes.

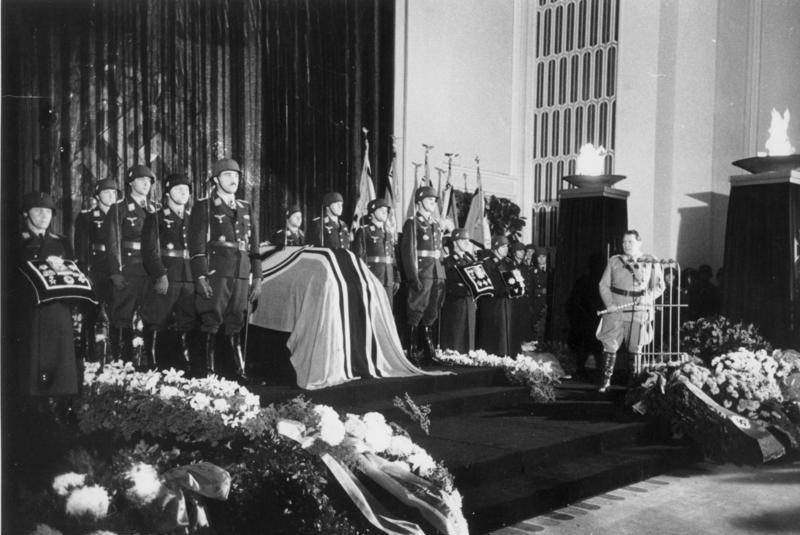
Oesau at the funeral of Ernst Udet. (Note: Oesau is the 2nd person on the left side of the coffin behind Adolf Galland and in front of Dietrich Peltz.)

JG 2 was tasked with defending targets in occupied France against the RAF fighter offensive. For the next two years Oesau led JG 2 through the war of attrition waged by the RAF. On 10 August 1941 Oesau claimed a Spitfire for his first kill with JG 2. Over the next two days, he claimed four more Spitfires. By the end of September 1941, Oesau had claimed two more Spitfires.

JG 2 participated in the Luftwaffe air cover of the Channel Dash. Two Boeing B-17C Flying Fortresses of No. 90 Squadron attacked the German battleships Scharnhorst and Gneisenau. In one of the highest altitude interceptions of World War II, the bombers were attacked by I./JG 2, resulting in the destruction of one. This aircraft put JG 2's score past the 800 mark, matching the score of their Great War namesake. Kills No. 88 to 92 were all Spitfires claimed between Calais and Dungeness on 12 August 1941. Oesau claimed his 100th kill on 26 October 1941, the third pilot to do so. (Note: The first fighter pilot to claim 100 aerial victories in combat was Oberstleutnant Werner Mölders on 15 July 1941 and the second was Major Günther Lützow on 24 October 1941.) This earned him his 4th entry in the Wehrmachtbericht.

He was then grounded from flying on operations, as his experience and leadership qualities were regarded as too valuable to risk further in front line combat. He did fly on occasional sorties, the most famous involving the shooting down of an Avro Lancaster bomber of No. 44 Squadron RAF piloted by Warrant Officer G. T. Rhodes in April 1942, during a rare RAF daylight raid on the MAN engine plant in Augsburg. It was his 101st kill. In August 1942, the Geschwaderstab of JG 2 exchanged their Bf 109 F aircraft for Fw 190 A–2s.

From late 1942 onwards JG 2 was in the front line against the increasingly numerous United States Army Air Forces (USAAF) day bomber formations of B-17s and B-24s.

Oesau added four more to his tally by mid-1943. Shortly before his 30th birthday, Oesau was elevated to a series of Luftwaffe staff and administration positions. On 1 July 1943 he was posted as Fighter Leader Brittany (Jagdfliegerführer Bretagne (Note: Reformed 6 September 1943 in Saint-Pol–Brias from Jagdfliegerführer 2)), before being appointed as Geschwaderkommodore of JG 1 on 12 November 1943, following the death of JG 1's Hans Philipp in October 1943. The ban on Oesau's combat flying was lifted. While commanding JG 1, Oesau became an expert (Experten) at shooting down 4 engine bombers, with 14 bomber kills claimed. He was awarded the Combined Pilots-Observation Badge in gold and diamonds on 17 October 1943. He was awarded the German Cross in Gold (Deutsches Kreuz in Gold) on 10 January 1944.

For Commander-in-Chief of the Luftwaffe Hermann Göring it was an ongoing concern that inadequate numbers of fighters were able to continually engage the bomber streams, at the very time that the USAAF's 8th Air Force's new commander, Maj. Gen. Jimmy Doolittle had instituted a new fighter strategy against the Luftwaffe. Hence on 23 February 1944 – near the midpoint of the USAAF's Big Week bomber offensive against the Luftwaffe, also being carried out by the 15th Air Force flying out of Italian bases – Generalmajor Joseph Schmid Commander of I. Jagdkorps established a new rule for the fighters returning to base. They were to arrive at the nearest designated fighter airfield for resupply instead of returning to their own base. They were to be commanded by the senior pilot landing on that airfield, irrespective of their unit. This was meant to turn around the fighters in time to intercept returning bombers.

On the next day, B-24s of 2nd Bomb division of the Eighth Air Force bombed Gotha. JG 1 (under Oesau), JG 11 and JG 3 were sent to intercept. Due to high winds, the bombers were ahead of the escorts unprotected. Two groups of JG 1 met them before Gotha and 9 B-24s were claimed as a result. Since B-17s of 1st Bomb division also bombed Schweinfurt, other fighter units also arrived to intercept, eventually involving almost all the Western day fighter units of the Luftwaffe. This caused some confusion among pilots landing on airfields other than their own. This tested the directive of Schmid. Oesau led one of two such improvised formations successfully, with the other led by Hauptmann Borris of I./JG 26 Oesau added 4 fighters to his score between January and March 1944, and his tally stood at 117. On 8 May 1944 he claimed a Thunderbolt shot down over Hanover; his last kill.

== Death ==
While being the Geschwaderkommodore of JG 1 Oesau frequently received his share of Hermann Göring's anger and frustration over the failure to beat off the Allied bomber offensive. Göring questioned the commitment of commanders who were not flying regularly and thus not really "leading" their respective units. In this context it should be stated that in order not to risk one of the Luftwaffe expert's life [German fighter aces were called Experten], there was an automatic ban on Oesau for further combat flying since his 100th victory. Perhaps the ban was lifted temporarily or bypassed when he was appointed Geschwaderkommodore of JG 1. On the other hand, Oesau might simply have ignored the ban and continued to lead missions.

Oesau added several victories over American heavy bombers in the first five months of 1944. On 11 May 1944 one thousand U.S. heavy bombers from Eighth Air Force attacked railway targets in Eastern France and North East Belgium. They were escorted by even more numbers of P-38 and P-51 fighters. Oesau was in bed with influenza. Upon hearing the news, Göring phoned Oesau's staff:

Göring – "Is the Kommodore flying?"
Staff – "No, he is in bed with fever."
Göring – "Yes, yes, I know that kind!", Göring said scornfully,
Göring – "He has also turned tired and coward!"

Angered by this comment, Oesau took off in a Bf 109 G-6/AS "Green 13" (Werknummer 20601—factory number) from Paderborn despite a high fever. Leading three aircraft of the Geschwaderstab, the schwarm broke formation over the Ardennes as it approached the bombers. In the dogfight Oesau's wingman reported damage to his machine and he was ordered to break off. Left alone, Oesau faced P-38s and possibly P-51s as well. According to Major Hartmann Grasser, Gruppenkommandeur of III./JG 1, who was on the same mission, there were five P-38s facing Oesau.

What followed is unclear as there are several versions. Oesau was chased by 1st Lt. James Leslie Doyle, 1st Lt. Wilbur L. Jarvis III and 1st Lt. James C. Austin, of the 428th Fighter Squadron (474th FG, 9th AF). All three were experienced pilots and chased Oesau from 28,000 feet to tree-top level. In the ensuing 20-minute dogfight, Oesau defended skillfully, though his aircraft was damaged by gunfire. While attempting an emergency landing, his Gustav received a final burst of fire in the cockpit area and crashed into the ground 10 kilometres (6.2 miles) southwest of St. Vith. His body was thrown clear of the aircraft some yards away.

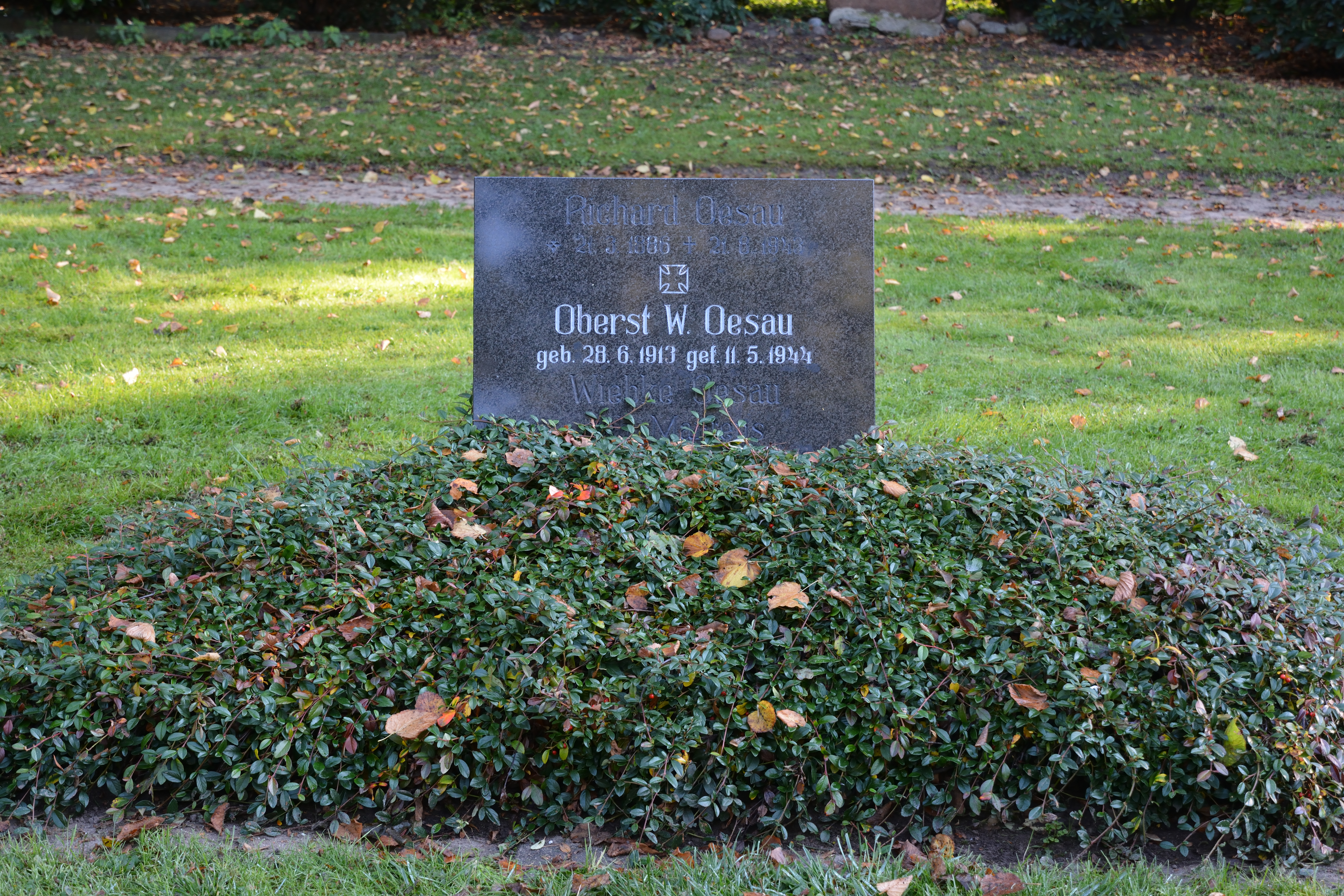
His grave in Meldorf.

According to the "Eighth Air Force Mission Folder for 11 May 1944, Mission 351", Lt. Doyle engaged in a turning dogfight with a pair of Bf 109s, scoring hits on the leader. Doyle had then broken off combat without claiming a kill, unaware that his victim, Oesau, had been killed by a 20 mm shell. Doyle's kill had been the first kill of the 474th Fighter Group in its first combat with the Luftwaffe.

There is some dispute regarding who exactly shot down his fighter. Some sources claim that he was shot during the dogfight and while the aircraft was falling to the ground, he was shot at again a few feet above ground, possibly by the Mustangs of 354th FG. Lt Wilbur Jarvis, No. 2 in the flight led by Doyle received a Damaged credit (not a kill) for Oesau's aircraft. Doyle noted bullet damage in the cockpit area and his gun camera footage showed that it was Oesau's Green 13. German records indicated that his death was caused by an explosive shell in the cockpit, his body having several bullet wounds. Later an image from the Gun camera was published (without caption) that purportedly showed Oesau's aircraft from the right side.

Oesau was aged 30 at the time of his death. He had a total of 127 kills gained over 300 missions. 27 were Spitfires, 14 four-engined bombers, 44 were scored on the Eastern Front and 9 in the Spanish Civil War. In recognition of his record, JG 1 received the title Oesau in honor of its fallen Geschwaderkommodore. Only Werner Mölders had a similar honor with JG 51 Mölders. Walter Oesau is buried in Meldorf, close to his birthplace and the town museum (Dithmarscher Landesmuseum) has documented his last journey in pictures.

== Aftermath ==
Johannes Steinhoff, the high-ranking Luftwaffe ace (176 kills), who went on to become the chief of staff for Allied Air Forces in Central Europe, once said: "Walter Gulle Oesau was the toughest fighter pilot in the Luftwaffe".

In 1940, frustrated with the perceived lack of success against RAF Fighter Command, Göring was keen on infusing the fighter force leadership with younger blood. He perceived a lack of aggressiveness in the Jagdgeschwader leadership. The likes of Theo Osterkamp were the first victim of this policy, handing over JG 51 to Werner Mölders. Oesau was considered to be one such rising star. However, being a star and staying in Göring's favor required keeping up the kill rate, and promotions were invariably linked to scores. According to Dr. Kurt Tank, the Focke–Wulf designer, although many of the younger generation were good flyers, they were unable to cope with problems of overall planning and broader strategic aspects. However, Oesau was one of the outstanding leaders ever produced by Luftwaffe fighter wings with the likes of Werner Mölders and Adolf Galland.

The decision to continually retain or return gifted experts (Experten) to front line battle proved extremely costly, resulting in the death in combat of many of the earlier experts and aces. This, coupled with the acute shortage of well-trained pilots and the fact that by 1943 they were facing a better-equipped and well-trained enemy, meant the life expectancy of even the most gifted was tragically short. Author John Weal says that, although other Geschwaderkommodore would end up dying in combat, nothing would showcase the changing fortunes of Luftwaffe fighter forces than the death of Walter Oesau.

== Personality and personal life ==
German historian Hans Otto Böhm commented on Oesau as "One of my best professors". There is little information available on the personal side of Walter Oesau. He had good sense of humor and liked to spend time with his friends. He was a simple man, who did not display any flamboyant personal emblems on his aircraft. His aircraft while commanding JG 2 did not have any special markings except for the unit's normal yellow under–cowling. While Oesau commanded, JG 2, like many others, dropped the special symbols for Stab (headquarters flight) units in favor of numerals. This helped make the leader's aircraft anonymous. Unlike other aces, Oesau reportedly never had markings on his rudder representing his personal tally, although this is contradicted by some photos displaying what may be his aircraft rudder painted with score of downed aircraft. The authenticity of the photograph is questioned by some as there are also Ju 87 photos supposedly signed by Oesau (he never flew a Stuka bomber).

== Summary of career ==
=== Aerial victory claims ===
According to US historian David T. Zabecki, Oesau was credited with 125 aerial victories, nine of which during the Spanish Civil War. Spick also lists him with 125 aerial victories claimed in approximately 300 combat missions and a mission-to-claim ratio of 2.40. Mathews and Foreman, authors of Luftwaffe Aces – Biographies and Victory Claims, researched the German Federal Archives and found documentation for 127 aerial victory claims, plus three further unconfirmed claims. This number includes nine claims during the Spanish Civil War, 44 on the Eastern Front, and 74 on the Western Front, including 13 four-engined bombers.

Victory claims were logged to a map-reference (PQ = Planquadrat), for example "PQ 05 Ost 0021". The Luftwaffe grid map (Jägermeldenetz) covered all of Europe, western Russia and North Africa and was composed of rectangles measuring 15 minutes of latitude by 30 minutes of longitude, an area of about 360 square miles (930 km^{2}). These sectors were then subdivided into 36 smaller units to give a location area 3 km × 4 km (1.9 mi × 2.5 mi) in size.

Chronicle of aerial victories
This and the ♠ (Ace of spades) indicates those aerial victories which made Oesau an "ace-in-a-day", a term which designates a fighter pilot who has shot down five or more airplanes in a single day. This and the – (dash) indicates unconfirmed aerial victory claims for which Oesau did not receive credit. This along with the * (asterisk) indicates an Herausschuss (separation shot)—a severely damaged heavy bomber forced to separate from his combat box which was counted as an aerial victory. This along with the & (ampersand) indicates an endgültige Vernichtung (final destruction)—a coup de grâce inflicted on an already damaged heavy bomber. This and the ? (question mark) indicates information discrepancies listed by Prien, Stemmer, Rodeike, Bock, Mathews and Foreman.
Claim	Date	Time	Type	Location	Claim	Date	Time	Type	Location
Spanish Civil War
– Stab of Jagdgruppe 88 – Spanish Civil War — July – November 1938
1	15 July 1938	—	I-15		6	15 August 1938	—	I-15	
2	17 July 1938	—	I-15		7	20 August 1938	—	I-16	
3	18 July 1938	—	I-16		8	15 October 1938	—	I-16	
4	20 July 1938	—	I-15		9	3 November 1938	—	I-16	
5	27 July 1938	—	SB-2						
World War II
– 1. Staffel of Jagdgeschwader 20 – Battle of France — 10 May – 25 June 1940
10	13 May 1940	19:27	Curtiss	Halsteren	12	31 May 1940	18:26	Spitfire	northwest of Dunkirk
— (Note: This unconfirmed claim is listed by Mathews and Foreman, but not by Prien, Stemmer, Rodeike and Bock.)	23 May 1940	—	Hurricane		13	1 June 1940	11:35	Blenheim	20 km (12 mi) north of Ostend
11	31 May 1940	18:22	Spitfire	northwest of Dunkirk	14? (Note: According to Mathews and Foreman this claim is unconfirmed.)	13 June 1940	15:41	Amiot 351	southwest of Les Andelys
– 7. Staffel of Jagdgeschwader 51 – At the Channel and over England — 26 June – August 1940
15	7 July 1940	14:05	Spitfire	5 km (3.1 mi) south of Dover	22	5 August 1940	09:59	Spitfire	10 km (6.2 mi) southwest of Dover
15? (Note: According to Mathews and Foreman this claim is listed as Oesau's 15th aerial victory. However, Prien, Stemmer, Rodeike and Bock do not list this claim.)	7 July 1940	19:27	Curtiss		23	14 August 1940	13:59	Hurricane	northwest of Dover
16	10 July 1940	14:39	Spitfire	5 km (3.1 mi) south of Dover	24	15 August 1940	12:32	Spitfire	south of Folkestone
17	10 July 1940	14:49	Spitfire	10 km (6.2 mi) south of Dover west of Folkestone	25	15 August 1940	12:34	Spitfire	5 km (3.1 mi) south of Folkestone
18? (Note: This claim is not listed by Mathews and Foreman.)	10 July 1940	15:04	Spitfire	west of Folkestone	26	16 August 1940	17:35	Spitfire	20 km (12 mi) northwest of Cap Gris-Nez
19	19 July 1940	13:50? (Note: According to Mathews and Foreman claimed at 13:48.)	Defiant	south of Folkestone	27	16 August 1940	17:36	Spitfire	20 km (12 mi) northwest of Cap Gris-Nez
20	19 July 1940	13:55? (Note: According to Mathews and Foreman claimed at 13:50.)	Hurricane	south of Dover	28	18 August 1940	18:37	Hurricane	3 km (1.9 mi) south of Canterbury
21	25 July 1940	15:52? (Note: According to Mathews and Foreman claimed at 15:34.)	Spitfire	5 km (3.1 mi) south of Dover	29	18 August 1940	18:50	Hurricane	8 km (5.0 mi) northwest of Cap Gris-Nez
– Stab III. Gruppe of Jagdgeschwader 51 – At the Channel and over England — September – November 1940
30	4 September 1940	—	Spitfire		40	28 September 1940	—	Spitfire	
31	6 September 1940	—	Spitfire		41	29 September 1940	—	Spitfire	
32	7 September 1940	—	Spitfire	London	42	29 September 1940	—	Spitfire	
33	11 September 1940	—	Spitfire		43	30 September 1940	—	Spitfire	
34	14 September 1940	—	Spitfire		44	5 October 1940	—	Spitfire	London
35	14 September 1940	—	Spitfire		45	12 October 1940	—	Spitfire	
36	15 September 1940	—	Spitfire		46	15 October 1940	—	Hurricane	
37	18 September 1940	14:30	Spitfire	5 km (3.1 mi) southeast of Ashford	47	25 October 1940	—	Spitfire	
38	27 September 1940	—	Hurricane		48	1 November 1940	—	Spitfire	
39	27 September 1940	—	Hurricane						
– Stab III. Gruppe of Jagdgeschwader 3 – At the Channel and over England — February – 9 June 1941
49	5 February 1941	15:05? (Note: According to Mathews and Foreman claimed at 14:05.)	Hurricane	Desvres	51	28 May 1941	19:25	Hurricane	north of Calais
50	16 May 1941	15:45	Spitfire	south of Folkestone					
– Stab III. Gruppe of Jagdgeschwader 3 – Operation Barbarossa — 22 June – July 1941
52	24 June 1941	12:08	I-18 (MiG-1)		74♠	10 July 1941	11:50	I-17 (MiG-1)	
53	24 June 1941	15:15	I-15		75♠	10 July 1941	12:35	Pe-2	
54	26 June 1941	06:42	SB-2		76♠	10 July 1941	15:55	I-153	
55	26 June 1941	06:45	SB-2		77♠	10 July 1941	18:35	I-16	east of Makarow
56	26 June 1941	12:45	I-15		78	11 July 1941	17:44	I-16	
57	26 June 1941	12:50	SB-2		79	11 July 1941	18:00	SB-2	
58	29 June 1941	18:10	V-11 (Il-2)	north of Ostroh	80♠	12 July 1941	13:00	V-11 (Il-2)	
59	30 June 1941	09:20	V-11 (Il-2)		81♠	12 July 1941	13:04	V-11 (Il-2)	
60	30 June 1941	13:30	SB-2		82♠	12 July 1941	15:35	I-16	
61	1 July 1941	18:20	SB-2	vicinity of Lviv	83♠	12 July 1941	15:35	I-16	
62	1 July 1941	18:22	SB-2	north of Hoszca	84♠	12 July 1941	15:35	I-16	
63	1 July 1941	18:24	SB-2	north of Korets	85♠	12 July 1941	15:36	SB-2	
64	2 July 1941	12:00	DB-3		86♠	12 July 1941	15:37	SB-2	
65	6 July 1941	14:42	SB-3		87	13 July 1941	11:44	DB-3	
66	6 July 1941	17:20	SB-2		88	15 July 1941	12:50	I-153	
67	6 July 1941	17:24	Pe-2		89	15 July 1941	12:55	DB-3	
68	7 July 1941	05:57	Pe-2		90	22 July 1941	16:40? (Note: According to Mathews and Foreman claimed at 11:20 over an Ilyushin DB-3.)	Il-2?	low level attack on an airfield
69	8 July 1941	13:00	SB-2		91	23 July 1941? (Note: According to Mathews and Foreman claimed on 22 July 1941 at 16:40 over an aircraft of unknown type.)	11:20?	DB-3?	
70	8 July 1941	13:02	SB-2		92	23 July 1941	13:44	SB-2	
71	8 July 1941	13:04	SB-2	northeast of Miropol	93	23 July 1941	15:28	I-15	
72	8 July 1941	17:15	SB-2		94	23 July 1941	17:22	DB-3	west of Bila Tserkva
73♠	10 July 1941	09:07	V-11 (Il-2)		95	24 July 1941	13:55	DB-3	
– Stab of Jagdgeschwader 2 "Richthofen" – On the Western Front — August – 31 December 1941
96	10 August 1941	14:15	Spitfire	northeast of Calais	103	21 August 1941	10:23	Spitfire	west of Calais
97♠	12 August 1941	11:43	Spitfire? (Note: According to Mathews and Foreman claimed as a Hawker Hurricane.)	north-northwest of Calais	104	21 August 1941	15:10	Spitfire	east of Étaples
98♠	12 August 1941	12:50? (Note: According to Mathews and Foreman claimed at 11:50.)	Spitfire	northwest of Saint-Omer	105	31 August 1941	20:07	Spitfire	Rouen
99♠	12 August 1941	12:54	Spitfire	northwest of Saint-Omer	106	4 September 1941	17:35	Spitfire	Saint-Omer/Béthune
100♠	12 August 1941	13:06	Spitfire	15 km (9.3 mi) southeast of Dover	107	13 October 1941	14:35	Spitfire	15 km (9.3 mi) southwest of Boulogne
101♠	12 August 1941	13:15? (Note: According to Mathews and Foreman claimed at 19:27.)	Spitfire	southeast of Dover; 15 km (9.3 mi) south of Dungeness	108	13 October 1941	15:28	Spitfire	
102	16 August 1941	19:38	Spitfire	4 km (2.5 mi) northwest of Calais	109	26 October 1941	13:08	Spitfire	
– Stab of Jagdgeschwader 2 "Richthofen" – On the Western Front — 1 January – 31 December 1942
110	17 April 1942	17:10	Lancaster	west of Évreux	111? (Note: According to Mathews and Foreman this claim is listed as Oesau's 111th aerial victory. However, Prien, Stemmer, Rodeike and Bock do not list this claim.)	20 December 1942	12:30	B-17	Melun
111	5 September 1942	12:30	Spitfire	PQ 05 Ost 0021	112	20 December 1942	13:53	B-17	25 km (16 mi) north-northwest of Dieppe
– Stab of Jagdgeschwader 2 "Richthofen" – On the Western Front — 1 January – 31 December 1943
113	4 April 1943	14:30	B-17	10 km (6.2 mi) southeast of Elbeuf west of Saint-Pierre	114	29 May 1943	17:25	B-17*	PQ 14 West 3972; PQ 14 West 3831
– Stab of Jagdgeschwader 1 – Defense of the Reich — January – 11 May 1944
115	5 January 1944	12:00? (Note: According to Mathews and Foreman claimed at 12:10.)	B-24	Heide	121	22 February 1944	15:25	B-17	
116	30 January 1944	12:00	B-17	southwest of Osnabrück	122	24 February 1944	12:40	B-17	PQ 05 Ost S/HT/HU, vicinity of Minden
—	30 January 1944	12:20	B-17&		123	25 February 1944	13:05	B-17	PQ 04 Ost N/AR, vicinity of Baden-Baden
117	8 February 1944	12:00	P-38	PQ 05 Ost S/PS; 220° from Bad Nauheim	124	25 February 1944	15:00	B-24	PQ 04 Ost N/AQ-2/3, west of Baden-Baden
118	10 February 1944	12:55? (Note: According to Mathews and Foreman claimed at 13:00.)	B-17	PQ 05 Ost S/FO, east of Zwolle	125	6 March 1944	12:05? (Note: According to Mathews and Foreman claimed at 12:10.)	P-47	PQ 05 Ost S/EQ, northwest of Vechta
119	10 February 1944	13:00	P-47	PQ 05 Ost S/FM/FN, vicinity of Zwolle	126	6 March 1944	12:20? (Note: According to Mathews and Foreman claimed at 12:10.)	B-17	PQ 05 Ost S/ER, south of Delmenhorst
120	22 February 1944	13:36? (Note: According to Mathews and Foreman claimed at 13:26.)	B-17	north of Thiel	127	8 May 1944	09:45? (Note: According to Mathews and Foreman claimed at 10:00.)	P-47	PQ 05 Ost S/FS/FT, southwest of Verden

=== Awards ===
- Spanish Medalla de la Campaña
- Spanish Medalla Militar
- Spanish Cross in Gold with Swords and Diamonds
- Iron Cross (1939)
  - 2nd Class (15 May 1940)
  - 1st Class (20 May 1940)
- Front Flying Clasp of the Luftwaffe in Gold for fighter pilots with pennant "300"
- Wound Badge (1939) in Black
- Knight's Cross of the Iron Cross with Oak Leaves and Swords
  - Knight's Cross on 20 August 1940 as Hauptmann and Staffelkapitän of the 7./Jagdgeschwader 51
  - 9th Oak Leaves on 6 February 1941 as Hauptmann and Gruppenkommandeur of the III./Jagdgeschwader 3
  - 3rd Swords on 15 July 1941 as Hauptmann and Gruppenkommandeur of the III./Jagdgeschwader 3 (Note: According to Scherzer on 16 July 1941.)
- German Cross in Gold on 17 October 1943 as Oberstleutnant and Jagdfliegerführer 4

=== Date of rank ===
October 1933:	Enlisted soldier
1934:	Fahnenjunker
20 April 1937:	Leutnant (Second lieutenant)
15 July 1939:	Oberleutnant (First lieutenant)
19 July 1940:	Hauptmann (Captain)
20 July 1941:	Major (Major)
1 February 1943:	Oberstleutnant (Lieutenant colonel)
1 May 1944:	Oberst (Colonel) (posthumous promotion)

== Notes ==
Military offices
Preceded by Wilhelm Balthasar	Commander of Jagdgeschwader 2 Richthofen; 4 July 1941 – 1 July 1943	Succeeded by Egon Mayer
Preceded by unknown	Commander of Jagdfliegerführer 4; 1 July 1943 – 6 September 1943	Succeeded by Jagdfliegerführer Bretagne
Preceded by Jagdfliegerführer 4	Commander of Jagdfliegerführer Bretagne; 6 September 1943 – 11 November 1943	Succeeded by Erich Mix
Preceded by Hermann Graf	Commander of Jagdgeschwader 1 Oesau; 12 November 1943 – 11 May 1944	Succeeded by Heinz Bär
