= Jagdfliegerführer 1 =

Jagdfliegerführer 1 was part of Luftflotte 2 (Air Fleet 2), one of the primary divisions of the German Luftwaffe in World War II. It was formed on December 21, 1939, in Jever. Jagdfliegerführer 1 was redesignated Jagdfliegerführer Mitte on April 1, 1941. The headquarters was located at Jever and from July 1940 on in Stade.

== Commanding officers ==
- Generalleutnant Theodor Osterkamp, 22 July 1940 – 31 December 1940
