= Jagdfliegerführer Sizilien =

Jagdfliegerführer Sizilien (Chief of Fighter Aviation Sicily) was part of Luftflotte 2 (Air Fleet 2), one of the primary divisions of the German Luftwaffe in World War II. It was formed on April 5, 1943 in Trapani, subordinated to the II. Fliegerkorps. The command moved to Rome in July 1943, and was then known as Jagdfliegerführer Luftflotte 2. The headquarters was located at Trapani and from July 1943 on in Rome. The unit was disbanded in August, 1943.

== Commanding officers ==
=== Fliegerführer ===
- Generalleutnant Theodor Osterkamp, 5 April 1943 - 15 June 1943
- Generalleutnant Adolf Galland, 15 June 1943 - 31 July 1943
- Oberstleutnant Carl Vieck, 31 July 1943 - August 1943
