= Riegele =

German brewery

Brauerei S. Riegele

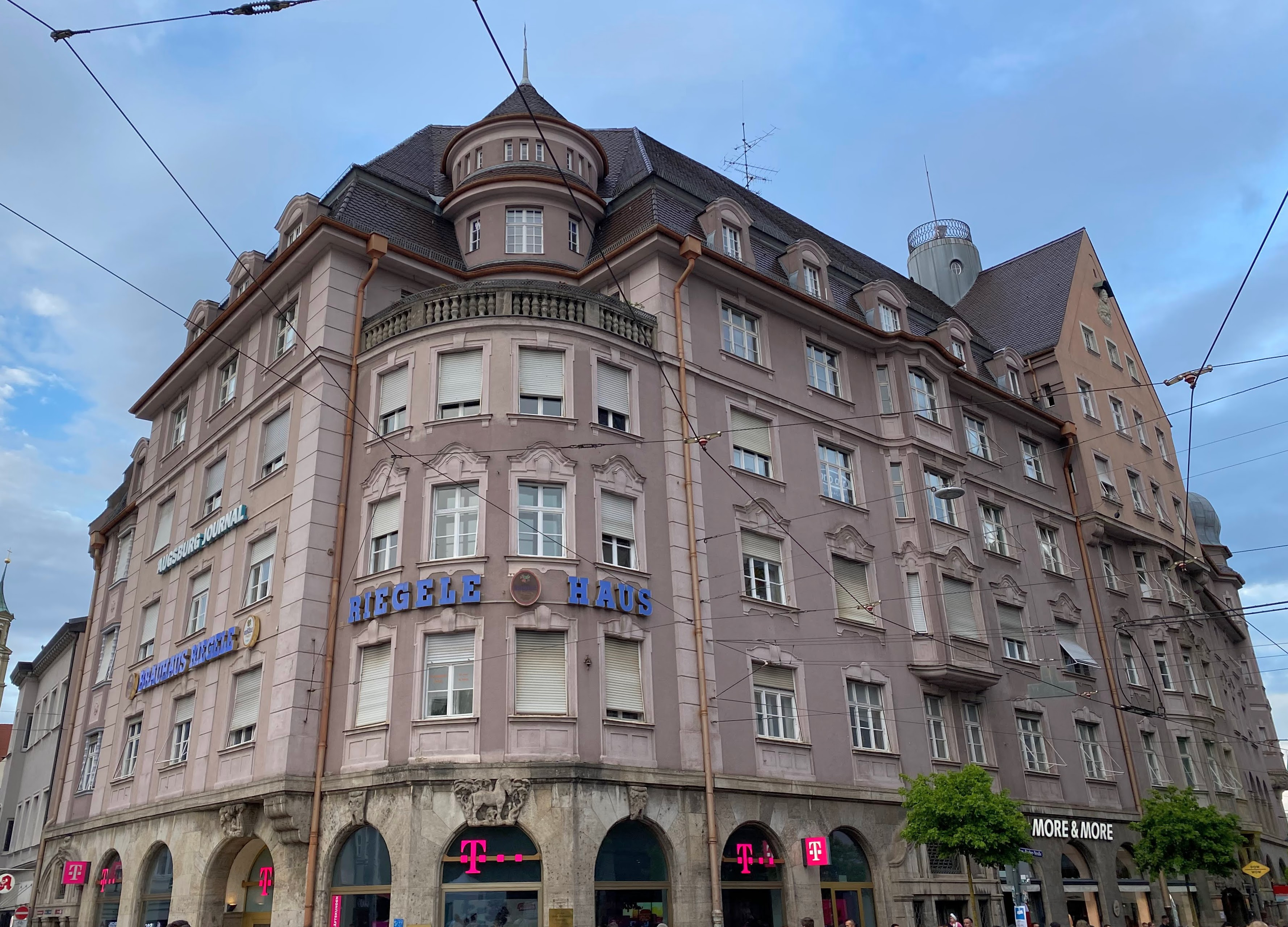
- Riegele Brauhaus
- Location: Augsburg, Germany Frölichstraße 26
- Coordinates: 48°22′4″N 10°53′5″E
- Opened: 1386
- Key people: Sebastian Priller-Riegele
- Website: riegele.de

Riegele is a traditional German brewery located in Augsburg, Swabia, Bavaria. It is run by the Priller family.

The Brauhaus Riegele was established in 1884, when Sebastian Riegele Sr. acquired the brewery "Zum Goldenen Ross", which dates back to 1386. In 1911, two new buildings were built: the "Riegelehaus" at the Königsplatz, as well as a new building outside the city.

At the end of the 1980s, the Brauhaus acquired the name rights for the lactic acid-based lemonade "Chabeso".

In 2015 Sierra Nevada Brewing Company partnered with Riegele on Oktoberfest.

== See also ==
- Josef Priller
- List of oldest companies
