= Jagdstaffel 54 =

Jasta 54
- Active: 1918
- Country: Kingdom of Saxony, German Empire
- Branch: Luftstreitkräfte
- Type: Fighter squadron
- Engagements: World War I

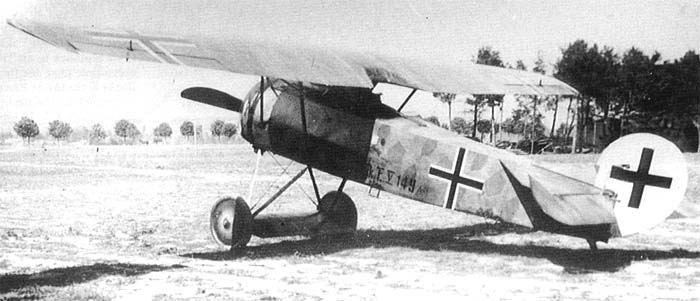
Fokker D.VIII aircraft of Jasta 54

Royal Saxon Jagdstaffel 54, commonly abbreviated to Jasta 54, was a "hunting group" (i.e., fighter squadron) of the Luftstreitkräfte, the air arm of the Imperial German Army during World War I. The squadron would score over 20 aerial victories during the war, including four observation balloons downed. The unit's victories came at the expense of three pilots killed, and one injured in a flying accidents.

== History ==
Jasta 54 was created on 1 January 1918 at Flieger-Abteilung ("Flier Detachment") 6, Großenhain, Kingdom of Saxony. It went operational on 15 January. On the 19th, the new squadron joined Jagdgruppe 10 as part of 2 Armee. On 17 March 1918, Jasta 54 scored its first aerial victories. It moved to support 4 Armee in late March. On 6 June 1918, it returned to 2 Armee even as the squadron joined Jagdgruppe 9. On 10 July, it shifted to support 3 Armee. In August 1918, JG 9 transferred to 18 Armee, whence Jasta 54 served through war's end.

== Commanding officers (Staffelführer) ==
- Paul Erbguth: 1 January 1918
- Paul Turck: April 1918
- Leutnant van Fichte

== Duty stations ==
- Neuvilly, France: 19 January 1918
- Monsen-Chausee: 25 March 1918
- Ingelmunster, Belgium
- Rumbeke East, Belgium
- Ennemain
- Blaise: 10 July 1918
- Morhange, France: August 1918
