= Brias =

- Commune
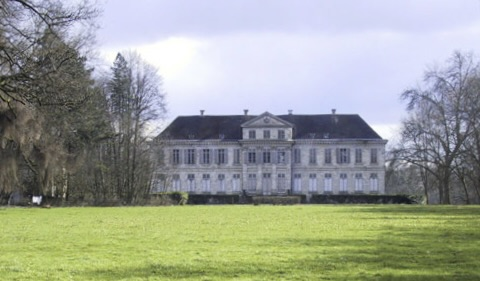
- The château of Bryas

- Coat of arms
- Location of Brias
- Location within France Location within Hauts-de-France
- Coordinates: 50°24′34″N 2°22′56″E
- Country: France
- Region: Hauts-de-France
- Department: Pas-de-Calais
- Arrondissement: Arras
- Canton: Saint-Pol-sur-Ternoise
- Intercommunality: CC Ternois

Government
  - Mayor (2020–2026): Cédric Demoulin
- Area^{1}: 7.74 km^{2} (2.99 sq mi)
- Elevation: 160 m (520 ft)
- Highest elevation: 166 m (545 ft)
- Lowest elevation: 122 m (400 ft)
- Population (2023): 295
  - Density: 38.1/km^{2} (98.7/sq mi)
- Time zone: UTC+01:00 (CET)
  - Summer (DST): UTC+02:00 (CEST)
- INSEE/Postal code: 62180 /62130
- ^{1} French Land Register data, which excludes lakes, ponds, glaciers > 1 km^{2} (0.386 sq mi or 247 acres) and river estuaries.

Brias (French pronunciation: [bʁija]; West Flemish: Briast, before 1997: Bryas) is a commune in the Pas-de-Calais department in the Hauts-de-France region in northern France.

== Geography ==
A farming village located 22 miles (35 km) northwest of Arras on the N41 road, at the junction with the D81.

== History ==
First mentioned in 1212, as the fiefdom of Gille de la Tourette. The château of Bryas served as headquarters for Marshal Foch during the Second Battle of Artois, in 1915. The commune agreed to change the spelling of the name from Bryas in 1997.

== Population ==
Historical population
Year	Pop.	±% p.a.
1968	269	—
1975	264	−0.27%
1982	278	+0.74%
1990	264	−0.64%
1999	235	−1.28%
2007	282	+2.31%
2012	319	+2.50%
2017	294	−1.62%
2023	295	+0.06%
Source: INSEE

== Sights ==
- The church of St. Martin
- The château, rebuilt between 1789 and 1805

== See also ==
- Communes of the Pas-de-Calais department
