= Jagdfliegerführer Bretagne =

Jagdfliegerführer Bretagne (Fighter Leader Brittany) was formed September 1943 in Rennes from Jagdfliegerführer 4, subordinated to the II. Jagdkorps. The headquarters was located at Rennes. The unit was disbanded on August 31, 1944

== Commanding officers ==
=== Fliegerführer ===
- Oberstleutnant Walter Oesau, September 1943 - 11 November 1943
- Oberst Dr. Erich Mix, 1 December 1943 - August 1944
