= Messerschmitt Bf 110 operational history =

Messerschmitt

Bf 110 operational history
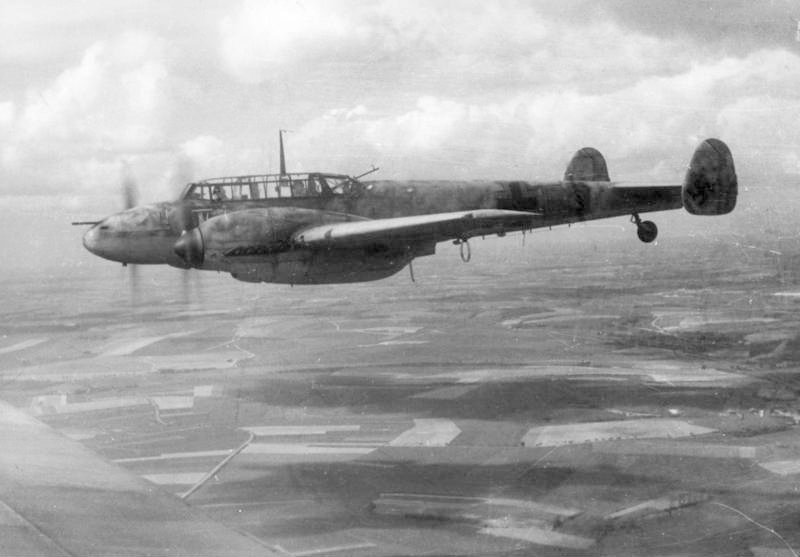
- Bf 110 of Nachtjagdgeschwader 4 (NJG 4)

The Messerschmitt Bf 110, often (erroneously) called Me 110, was a twin-engine heavy fighter (Zerstörer – German for "Destroyer" – a concept that in German service involved a long-ranged, powerful fighter able to range about friendly or even enemy territory destroying enemy bombers and even fighters when located) in the service of the Luftwaffe during the Second World War. Hermann Göring was a proponent of the Bf 110, and nicknamed it his Eisenseiten ("Ironsides"). Development work on an improved type to replace the Bf 110, the Messerschmitt Me 210 began before the war started, but its teething troubles resulted in the Bf 110 soldiering on until the end of the war in various roles, alongside its replacements, the Me 210 and the Me 410.

The Bf 110 served with success in the early campaigns in Poland, Norway and France. The Bf 110's lack of agility in the air was its primary weakness. This flaw was exposed during the Battle of Britain, when some Bf 110-equipped units were withdrawn from the battle after very heavy losses and redeployed as night fighters, a role to which the aircraft was well suited. The Bf 110 enjoyed a successful period following the Battle of Britain as an air superiority fighter and strike aircraft in other theatres. During the Balkans Campaign, North African Campaign and on the Eastern Front, it rendered valuable ground support to the German Army as a potent fighter-bomber (Jagdbomber-Jabo). Later in the war, it was developed into a formidable night fighter, becoming the major night-fighting aircraft of the Luftwaffe. Most of the German night fighter aces flew the Bf 110 at some point during their combat careers, and the top night fighter ace of all time, Major Heinz-Wolfgang Schnaufer, flew it exclusively and claimed 121 victories in 164 combat missions.

== Polish Campaign ==
At the start of the Polish Campaign, the Luftwaffe mounted a mass attack on the aerodromes used by the Polish Air Force; the Bf 110s were used to escort these bombers and engage any Polish fighters encountered. Hermann Göring reportedly ordered the Zerstörerwaffe to make all the Luftwaffe's Bf 110s available for operations. According to the Luftwaffe Order of Battle, a total of 102 Bf 110s were used in the September Campaign with a loss of about 10 aircraft. Polish pilots were unfamiliar with the type often identifying them as bombers. Future ace, commander of Nachtjagdgeschwader 1 and Jagdfliegerführer Rumänien Wolfgang Falck scored his first kills over Poland, as did future night fighter ace Helmut Lent and Gordon Gollob, future General der Jagdflieger. Falck's unit, I./ZG 76, claimed 31 kills during the campaign, of which 19 were confirmed. I(Z)./LG 1 also contributed; escorting German bomber formations on attacks against Warsaw, the unit claimed 30 kills on the first day. Polish fighter units reported a 17% loss rate on this day. This rose to 72% in five days. JGr 2 also claimed 28 aerial and 50 ground victories.

== The Phoney War and the "Battle of German Bight" ==
Most of the units protecting western Germany from aerial attack were equipped with the Messerschmitt Bf 109. One of the Bf 110 units assigned to air defence in this sector was Lehrgeschwader 1. On 23 November 1939, the Bf 110 claimed its first Allied victim when LG 1 Bf 110s engaged and shot down a Morane-Saulnier M.S.406 of the Armée de l'Air over Verdun. Just three weeks later, on 18 December 1939, the Bf 110 participated in the first German victory over British arms in the Second World War RAF Bomber Command sent 22 Vickers Wellington bombers to attack the German naval base at Wilhelmshaven. Despite help from Bf 109 units, it was the Bf 110 which excelled in the bomber destroyer role. By the end of the fighting, the Germans had claimed 38 RAF bombers. Actual losses were 11 Wellingtons and six damaged to varying degrees. Some sources claim a 12th Wellington was destroyed. The raid convinced RAF Bomber Command to consider abandoning the daylight bombing of Germany in favour of night actions.

== Invasions of Denmark and Norway ==
The Bf 110 Zerstörerwaffe (Destroyer Force) saw considerable action during operation Operation Weserübung, the invasion of Denmark and Norway. Two Zerstörergeschwader, (1 and 76), were committed, with 64 aircraft. The Bf 110s destroyed 25 Danish military aircraft stationed on the Værløse airbase on 9 April through ground strafing. One Danish Fokker C.V did manage to get airborne but was immediately shot down. During this campaign, Victor Mölders, brother of the famous Werner Mölders, took the official surrender of the town of Aalborg after landing at the local airfield. Dressed in flying gear, he was given a lift into the town centre by a milkman to find suitable quarters for I./Zerstörergeschwader 1's (ZG 1) Bf 110 crews.

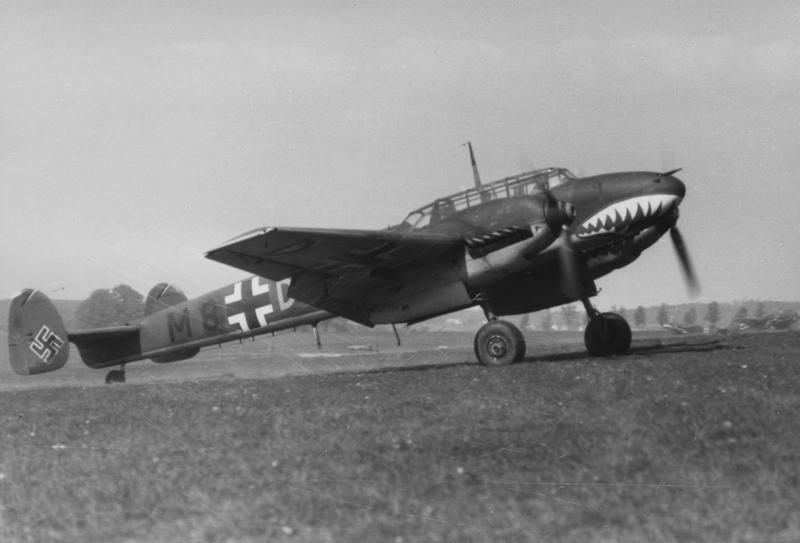
A ZG 76 Bf 110C with "sharks mouth" nose paint

In Norway, the Bf 110s helped secure the Oslo-Fornebu airport, escorting Junkers Ju 52 transports loaded with paratroops (Fallschirmjäger). The Germans were engaged by several Gloster Gladiators and machine guns manned by troops on the ground; in the ensuing battle, both sides lost two aircraft. The Messerschmitt pilots did not know that many earlier waves of transports had turned back and that the airport was unsecured. Landing their cargoes, many transports were destroyed. The remaining Bf 110s strafed the airfield and helped the ground troops take it; the air support provided by the Zerstörer was instrumental, and it was to perform well as a fighter-bomber in the coming campaigns. During these battles, a future 110-kill Luftwaffe ace, Helmut Lent, scored his fifth and sixth victories against Norwegian opposition.

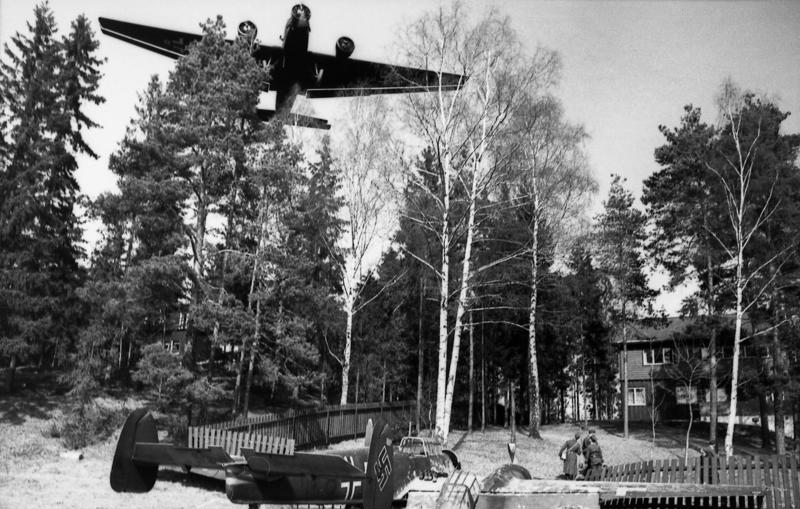
Helmut Lent's Bf 110C. Lent ran out of fuel and force landed at Oslo Fornebu airfield on 9 April 1940 (the aircraft flying above the trees is a Junkers Ju 52 transport).

With experience fighting in Norway, efforts were made to extend the combat range of the Bf 110C; these became the Bf 110D Long Range (Langstrecken) Zerstörer. Several different external fuel tanks, originally a 1,200 L (320 US gal) centerline ventral fuel tank (nicknamed Dackelbauch (dachshund's belly), later 300 L or 900 L (240 US gal) underwing-mounted tanks, resulted in no less than four versions of the Bf 110D. The enormous Dackelbauch ventral tank, owing to cold weather and limited knowledge of fuel vapours, sometimes exploded, leading to unexplained losses during the North Sea patrols. As a result, the aircrews came to dislike this version. The handling characteristics were also affected; the Bf 110 was not manoeuvrable to begin with and the added weight made it worse.

The Zerstörerwaffe performed well when it encountered mostly British bombers. On 13 June 1940, a squadron of Skua dive bombers was intercepted trying to reach and bomb the German battleship Scharnhorst. A squadron of Bf 109s and another of Bf 110s shot down eight in as many minutes with the Bf 110s claiming four kills; among the victors was Herbert Schob, who survived the conflict as one of the most successful Bf 110 pilots. Total losses during this campaign amounted to little more than 20. During July, the RAF made several raids on Norway. On 9 July 1940, seven out of a force of 12 Bristol Blenheims bombing Stavanger were shot down by a mixed force of Bf 110s and Bf 109s from ZG 76 and JG 77 respectively.

== Western Campaign, 1940 ==
In the spring of 1940, Walter Horten, Jagdgeschwader 26 technical officer, was invited to participate in a "mock combat" with a Bf 109E. The Bf 109 bested the Bf 110 time and again. Afterward, Horten said,

Gentlemen, be very careful if you should ever come up against the English. Their fighters are all single-engined. And once they get to know the Bf 110's weaknesses, you could be in for a very nasty surprise.

During the Phoney War, a number of French aircraft were shot down by Bf 110s. ZG 1 Gruppenkommander Hauptmann Hannes Gentzen became the highest-scoring fighter pilot in the Luftwaffe on 2 April, when he shot down a Curtiss Hawk over Argonne. For the attack on the Netherlands, 145 Bf 110s were committed under Oberst Kurt-Bertram von Döring's Jagdfliegerführer 2. During the campaign, the Bf 110 demonstrated its capabilities as a strike aircraft. On 10 May, ZG 1 claimed 26 Dutch aircraft destroyed on the ground on Haamstede airfield. Between 11 and 13 May, most of the 82 aerial claims over Belgium were made by the Bf 110 equipped ZG 26. However, this was tempered by the loss of nine Bf 110s against the RAF on 15 May. By this date, Oberstleutnant Friedrich Vollbracht's ZG 2 had claimed 66 Allied aircraft.

The Bf 110 force also encountered the Swiss Air Force during this period, as several German raids violated Swiss airspace. About five Bf 110s were shot down by Swiss Bf 109s. The Bf 110s participation in Fall Rot's Operation Paula, an offensive to destroy the remaining elements of the French Air Force in central France, was to lead to 101 losses for the Luftwaffe, of which just four were Bf 110s. No further losses of the type occurred for the remainder of the campaign.

The campaign in the west that followed in 1940 demonstrated that the Bf 110 was vulnerable in hostile skies. It performed well against the Belgian, Dutch and French Air Forces, suffering relatively light losses, but was quickly outclassed by increasing numbers of Hurricanes and Spitfires, especially when forced into a tactical role it was never intended for – close range bomber escort – where it was unable to take advantage of its superior altitude performance and speed, and was forced to wait for the enemy to attack rather than roaming about finding and destroying enemy aircraft, as the original Zerstörer concept had intended. In the Western Campaign, 60 were lost. This represented 32 percent of the Zerstörerwaffe's initial strength.

== Battle of Britain ==
The Battle of Britain revealed the Bf 110's fatal weaknesses as a daylight fighter against single-engine aircraft. A relatively large aircraft, it lacked the agility of the Hurricane and Spitfire and was easily seen. Furthermore, although it had a higher top speed than contemporary Royal Air Force (RAF) Hurricanes, it had poor acceleration. However, it was better suited as a long-range bomber escort than most other aircraft of the time, and did not have the problems of restricted range that hampered the Bf 109E. The design excelled at "high escort" where Bf-110 squadrons were sent well ahead of the bombers to clear the skies of enemy aircraft, using their speed and firepower advantages in diving attacks to counter the enemy's maneuverability, then breaking contact and climbing away, what the Americans would later call "Boom-and-Zoom." But the Bf-110 suffered greatly in "close escort," where they were forced to lumber alongside the slow bombers, taking away their tactical edge and forcing them to always respond to the attacking fighters, which were never taken by surprise and could easily avoid the attacks of the Zerstörer, and even turn the tables. This limitation of tactical flexibility greatly hampered the ability of the Bf 110 to counter enemy single-engine fighters on a level of parity.

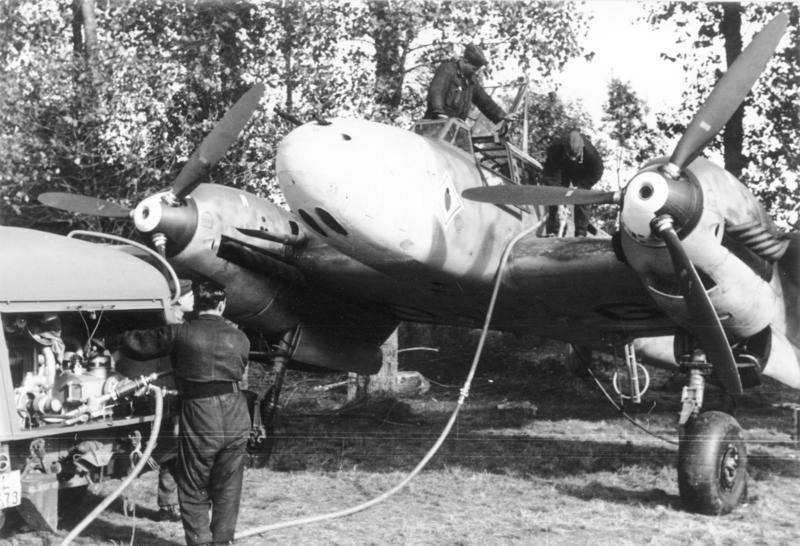
Bf 110C under refueling, October 1940

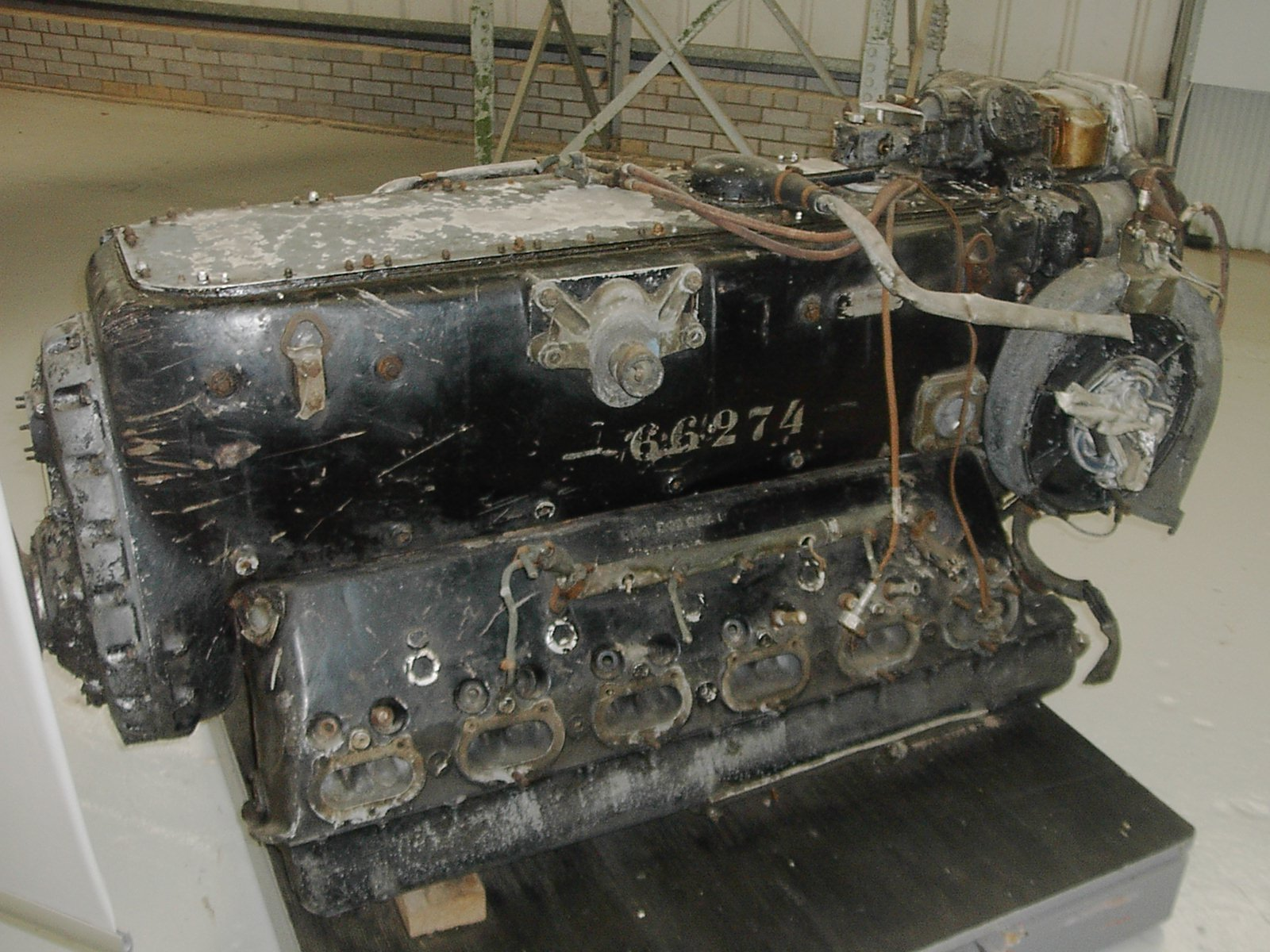
One of the engines from Hess's Bf 110 on display at the National Museum of Flight in East Lothian, Scotland.

Hermann Göring's nephew, Hans-Joachim Göring, was a pilot with III./Zerstörergeschwader 76, flying the Messerschmitt Bf 110. He was killed in action on 11 July 1940, when his Bf 110 was shot down by Hurricanes of No. 87 Squadron RAF. His aircraft crashed into Portland Harbour.

The worst day of the battle for the Bf 110 was 15 August 1940, when nearly 30 Bf 110s were shot down, the equivalent of an entire Gruppe. Between 16 and 17 August, 23 more were lost.

After the 18 August there was a marked reduction in the number of Zerstörer operations. Their seeming absence has often been equated with the simultaneous disappearance from the Battle of the Ju 87. But whereas the Ju 87 had to be withdrawn because it simply could not survive in the hostile environment over southern England in the late summer of 1940, the reason for the decrease in Bf 110 activity was much more mundane. Replacements were not keeping pace with losses. There were just not enough Zerstörer available.

— Messerschmitt Bf 110 Zerstörer Aces, World War Two

The last day of August proved to be a rare success for the Bf 110. ZG 26 claimed 13 RAF fighters shot down, which "was not far off the mark", for three losses and five damaged. However, on 4 and 27 September, 15 Bf 110s were lost on each day. The Luftwaffe had embarked on the battle with 237 serviceable Bf 110s. 223 were lost in the course of it.

On 10 May 1941, in a strange episode in the aftermath of the Battle of Britain, Rudolf Hess, the deputy leader of the Nazi party, flew in a Bf 110 from Augsburg, north of Munich, to Scotland, apparently in an attempt to broker a peace deal between Germany and Great Britain.

== Balkans Campaign ==
The Messerschmitt Bf 110C and Es were committed to the invasions of Yugoslavia and Greece in April 1941. I. and II./ZG 26 were deployed to the theatre. Once again, the Bf 110 encountered foreign flown Messerschmitt Bf 109s, this time belonging to the Yugoslav Air Force. As over Switzerland in 1940, the battles ended in their opponent's favor. On the first day, 6 April, Bf 110s of I./ZG 26 lost five of their number in exchange for two Yugoslav Bf 109s. II./ZG dispatched several Hawker Furys, but managed to lose two of their own against the biplanes.

Over Greece, on 20 April, II./ZG 26 claimed five Hurricanes of No. 33 and No. 80 Squadron RAF for two losses. This engagement saw the death of 50-victory ace Marmaduke Pattle of No 33 Squadron. Staffelkapitän Hauptmann Theodor Rossiwall and Oberleutnant Sophus Baagoe were amongst the claimers on this day, taking their scores to 12 and 14. Also killed in this battle was the ace F/Lt W.J. "Timber" Woods of No. 80 Squadron with 6½ kills. Oberleutnant Baagoe was killed on 14 May 1941 while on a strafing mission during the Battle of Crete. The British defences and a Gloster Gladiator pilot claimed credit. Around 12 Bf 110s were lost over Crete.

== North Africa, the Mediterranean and Middle East ==
The Rashid Ali Rebellion and resulting Anglo-Iraqi War saw the Luftwaffe commit 12 of 4./ZG 76's Bf 110s to the Iraqi Nationalist cause as part of "Flyer Command Iraq" (Fliegerführer Irak). The German machines reached Iraq in the first week of May 1941. The campaign in the desert would last for ten days. Two RAF Gladiators were claimed by future night fighter ace Martin Drewes, but RAF raids badly damaged two Bf 110s. However, by the 26 May, no Bf 110s were left serviceable and German personnel were evacuated. One Bf 110 (Wk-Nr 4035) was captured by the RAF and test flown as RAF serial HK846, "Belle of Berlin". Based in Cairo, Egypt, it was to be deployed to South Africa as part of a program to train pilots on enemy equipment, but it did not make it, crashing in the Sudan.

In the North African Campaign, the Bf 110 acted as a support aircraft for the Junkers Ju 87 Stuka units. In 1941, nearly 20% of the Zerstörergeschwader's missions were ground-attack orientated. A number of Bf 110 aces were lost in aerial combat during this period, and other losses were considerable.

Significantly, on the night of 22–23 May, the Bf 110 was pressed into night fighting service over the desert. Oberleutnant Alfred Wehmeyer scored three nocturnal kills against Allied bombers in the space of a week. In August 1942, a stalemate between the Allied and Axis forces in North Africa permitted the withdrawal of III./ZG 26 to Crete for convoy protection. During this time, a number of United States Army Air Forces B-24 Liberators were destroyed. On 29 September 1942, while on patrol alone, Oberleutnant Helmut Haugk of ZG 26 engaged a formation of 11 B-24s, dispatching two of the bombers. The Bf 110 had demonstrated its capability in a role it was to excel in over Europe. Lastly, in February 1945, two Bf 110G-4s were supplied to the Air Force of the Independent State of Croatia (ZNDH). One was destroyed by Allied bombing at Zagreb; the other survived and sought sanctuary at Klagenfurt in Austria with other retreating ZNDH aircraft in May 1945.

== Eastern Front ==
Just 51 air worthy Bf 110s took part in the initial rounds of Operation Barbarossa, and all were from three units; ZG 26, Schnellkampfgeschwader 210 (redesignated from Erprobungsgruppe 210) and ZG 76. The Bf 110 rendered valuable support to the German Army by carrying out strike missions in the face of very heavy anti-aircraft artillery defences. A huge number of ground kills were achieved by Bf 110 pilots in the east. Some of the most successful were Leutnant Eduard Meyer, who received the Knight's Cross on 20 December 1941 for 18 aerial victories and 48 aircraft destroyed on the ground, as well as two tank kills. Oberleutnant Johannes Kiel was credited with 62 aircraft destroyed on the ground, plus nine tanks and 20 artillery pieces. He was later credited with a submarine sunk and three motor torpedo boats sunk.

In the far north, in the battlefields between Kirkenes (Norway) and the port of Murmansk, the Bf 110 still could claim important successes in the first half of 1942. For example, the Zerstorer unit deployed there, the 10.(Z)/JG 5, achieved an important victory on 10 May 1942 when six of its Bf 110s, which were escorting Ju 88s of the KG 30, ran into a formation of six Soviet SB-2 bombers escorted by nine Hurricanes of the 2 GSAP. In the ensuing dogfight, the Zerstorer pilots not only wildly overclaimed 13 victories (when their opponents were only nine) but also misidentified them as "MiG-3", including five claims by experte Theodor Weissenberger. However, the 2 GSAP indeed lost five Hurricanes in that combat, for only one Bf 110 lost in return, which is a remarkable victory. In total, Weissenberger scored his first 21 victories (out of his 175 on the Eastern Front) on the Bf 110; he would score 33 more in 1945 while flying Me 262 against Western aircraft).

In the role of ground support, and flown by seasoned pilots, the Bf 110 (particularly the version F-4) was lethal. For example, during Operation Blau, on 3 July 1942 the Gruppenkommandeur of I./ZG 1, Hauptmann Wolfgang Schenck and his three wingmen repeatedly attacked a column of 50 Soviet vehicles, destroying 30 of them. Schenk was to achieve 18 aerial victory credits on the Zerstorer, and was awarded with Eichenlaub (Oak Leaves) for the Knight's Cross on 30 October 1942. One of his deputies, Leutnant Rudolf Scheffel, was awarded the Ritterkreuz (Knight's Cross of the Iron Cross) a day earlier for scoring five aerial victories and destroying 50 Soviet tanks during Operation Blau.

As long as the brunt of air opposition in that front consisted of slow and outclassed Polikarpov I-153, I-15bis and I-16 fighters, and the tactics and training of the Soviet pilots were inferior to those of the German airmen, the Bf 110 could still more than hold its own in the skies of the East. But the mid to fall of 1942 meant the end of that era, and the losses began to mount very quickly. A couple of examples show the increasing toll taken by the Bf 110 at the hands of the Soviet airmen:

- On 11 March 1942 the 6.(Z)/JG 5 lost three Bf 110 at the hands of Soviet P-40 Tomahawks of the 147 IAP (later 20 GIAP), in the Arctic front.
- On 8 July 1942 the LaGG-3-equipped 131 IAP shot down four Bf 110E of ZG 1 over the Donbass, without losses on the Soviet side.
- The story repeated on 13 July 1942, when five Bf 110s of 5./ZG 1 were shot down in a single combat against the LaGG-3s of the same Soviet unit (131 IAP), which recorded the encounter on the 14th. The Bf 110E-1 "SB+EN" flown by Oberfeldwebel Willi Dibowski and Unteroffizier Kurt Meyer was probably the sixth victim of Soviet ace Leytenant Dmitriy Pavlovich Nazarenko. Nazarenko would end the war with 18 individual victories and 7 shared ones, being awarded the title of Geroy Sovietskogo Soyuza (Hero of the Soviet Union).
- On 17 September 1942 the Bf 110Es of the 5./ZG 1 ran into four Yak-1s of 182 IAP/105 IAD, and two of them were immediately shot down by the Soviet airmen, together with one of the escorting Bf 109G of II./JG 52. One of crews went missing in action and the other was wounded. Later that day the Zerstorer unit lost one more aircraft when a Polikarpov I-16 flown by Leytenant Ivan Matveyev (738 IAP) rammed the Bf 110E of Unteroffiziers Gottfied Seifert and Alfred Brandt, killing both German airmen.
- The 1./ZG 1 lost two Zerstorers over Stalingrad on 19 September 1942 when LaGG-3 pilot Lev Binov, batalioniy komissar of the 291 IAP, shot down the Bf 110E-1 "S9+PH" of Unteroffizier Richard Söchtig and then rammed the aircraft "S9+AH" of Oberleutnant Theo Kehl, the unit's Staffelkapitan. Binov could bail out of his airplane, but both German crewmembers perished.

At the beginning of Operation Blau, on 28 June 1942, the Luftflotte 4 had 86 operational Zerstorers, including fifteen Bf 110 which performed reconnaissance duties in three units – 3.(H)/31, 3.(H)/11 and 7.(H)/LG 2; the remaining 71 examples served on ZG1 and ZG 2. Only one month later, ZG 1 and ZG 2 had lost 31 Bf 110s (all to Soviet fighters), plus five more of the recce units to the same cause. As a result, ZG 2 was disbanded, and all its surviving aircraft were transferred to ZG 1.

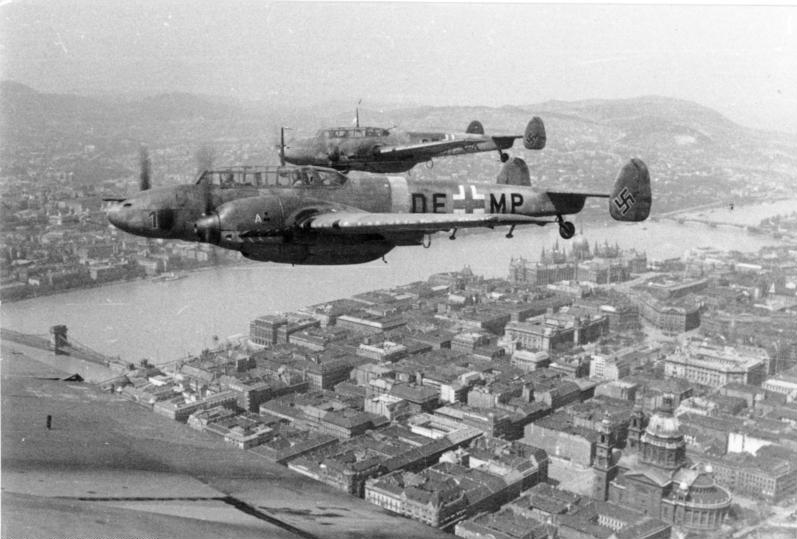
Bf 110Gs over Budapest, Hungary, 1944

The number of Bf 110s on the Eastern Front declined further during and after 1942. Most units that operated the 110 did so for reconnaissance. Most machines were withdrawn to Nazi Germany for the Defense of the Reich operations.

== Defence of the Reich ==
Eventually withdrawn from daylight fighting, the Bf 110 enjoyed later success as a night fighter, where its range and firepower stood it in good stead for the remainder of the conflict. The airframe allowed for a dedicated radar operator, and the open nose had space for radar antennae, unlike the single-engine fighters. As the war wore on, the increased weight of armament and radar detection equipment (along with a third crew member) took an increasing toll of the aircraft's performance.

It was also used as a ground attack aircraft, starting with the C-4/B model, and as a day bomber interceptor, where its heavy firepower was particularly useful. Later on, there were dedicated ground attack versions which proved reasonably successful. The Bf 110 served the Luftwaffe extensively in various roles, though no longer in its intended role as a heavy fighter. Another role the Bf 110 took on was as a potent bomber-destroyer. The extreme power of the Bf 110's weaponry (when fitted with 20mm and 30mm cannon) could cripple or destroy any Allied bomber in seconds. Without encountering an Allied escort, it was capable of wreaking immense destruction. When encumbered with a total of four 21 cm (8 in) Werfer-Granate 21 (Wfr.Gr. 21) rocket tubes, with two of these under each outer wing panel, and additional armament, the Bf 110 was vulnerable to Allied escort fighters, partly from the development of a major change in American fighter tactics at the end of 1943, rendering them increasingly vulnerable to developing American air supremacy over the Reich. In late 1943 and early 1944, Bf 110 formations were frequently devastated by the roving Allied fighters.

It was in the role as a night fighter, often armed with the surprisingly effective Schräge Musik upward-firing twin autocannon offensive armament installation, that the Bf 110 and its pilots achieved their greatest successes. Luftwaffe night fighter ace Heinz-Wolfgang Schnaufer was the highest scorer in the Defence of the Reich campaign and ended the war with 121 aerial victories, virtually all of them achieved while flying examples of the Bf 110. Others, such as Helmut Lent, switched to the night fighter arm and built on their modest daylight scores. Other aircraft, such as the Junkers Ju 88 and the Dornier Do 217, also played a big role, but none more so than the Bf 110.

== Daylight operations ==
In January 1943, the Eighth Air Force began taking their daylight operations into Germany. Beyond the range of fighter escort, Bomber Command discouraged the idea, but the Eighth believed their aircraft would be able to fight their way through to the target. The initial raid was against Wilhelmshaven. The first attack on 27 January was conducted with 60 B-17 Flying Fortresses, and was met by resistance from JG-1. The B-17s brushed the defenses aside and delivered their loads on Wilhelmshaven, while suffering the loss of three aircraft. Reichsmarschall Hermann Göring insisted that all aircraft, including the night fighter force, would be put into the air to resist these attacks against Germany. The second raid 4 February was mounted against the marshaling yards at Hamm. Poor weather was a problem, and the mission was diverted to the industrial area of Emden. JG 1 again responded, but this time they were joined by eight Bf 110s of Nachtjagdgeschwader 1. Neither German fighter unit possessed the techniques of attack developed in northern France by JG 2 and JG 26, and had a difficult time engaging the bombers. Official Luftwaffe doctrine was to attack bombers from the rear and above. Against the heavily gunned B-17s, crews knew such attacks were suicidal. Several attacks from the beam were made, and eventually a break in the formation opened a gap which Hans-Joachim Jabs and his wingman took advantage of. Getting into the formation both made head on attacks and were each credited with the destruction of a B-17. Overall, five B-17s were lost on the mission, one due to a mid-air collision with a Fw 190, but of the eight Bf 110 aircraft put up, all eight suffered significant damage.

Said Jabs;

This was my only day victory in a night fighter. We flew these missions at no greater than Schwarm strength, and were ourselves never escorted. It was wasteful to use highly trained night fighter crews in this role, and it was given up when the US escorts appeared.

On 4 March, the Eighth Air Force returned, this time losing three B-17s, with two Bf 110s being lost in the attacks. On such missions USAAF bombers were afforded limited protection by American fighters, which did not yet have sufficient range to escort the bombers all the way to and from the target on deeper raids. This gave the Zerstörer force a window of opportunity to wreak damage on the bomber streams. However, the Bf 110s were called away to the Eastern and North African fronts "rapidly" and "often" to perform strike, reconnaissance and even dive-bombing missions, leading to inevitable losses. When these units returned to the Reich, they were depleted and required reforming, retraining and re-equipping. The wastage and woeful deployment of the type prevented any lasting success.

In autumn 1943, the Zerstörergruppen were recalled from their Eastern or Mediterranean bases, and formed into RLV units. Along with the Me 410, it formed the newly rebuilt ZG 26, equipped with three Gruppen (two Bf 110 and one Me 410), based near Hannover. I. and III./ZG 76 were based in Austria, and II./ZG 76 was based in France. On 4 October 1943, the Bf 110 Geschwader intercepted B-17s of the 3rd Bomb Division. The targets around Frankfurt and the Saar region were hit. The Bf 110s flew alone against this formation and destroyed four B-17s, before having the misfortune of running into 56th Fighter Group P47 Thunderbolts. The Bf 110s lost nine machines, with 11 killed and seven wounded. It is not clear if they managed to shoot down any of their attackers.

The Bf 110 also supported the German defence during Big Week in February 1944, as Lt. Gen. Doolittle's tactical changes for the Eighth Air Force's escort fighters (increasingly consisting of P-51 Mustangs) went into effect:

The experiences of Zerstörergeschwader "Horst Wessel", a Bf 110 squadron, indicates what happened to twin-engine fighters in the new combat environment. The unit worked up over January and February to operational ready status. At 12:13 pm on February 20, 13 Bf 110s scrambled after approaching formations. Six minutes later three more took off to join the first group. When they arrived at the designated contact point there was nothing left to meet. American fighters had jumped the 13 Bf 110s from the sun and shot down 11. Meanwhile, two enemy fighters strafed the airfield and damaged nine more aircraft.

On 22 February, six Bf 110s were lost for two kills against B-17s, while on 6 March, five Bf 110s were lost and one damaged out of nine machines committed. By April 1944, the Oberkommando der Luftwaffe had hoped to convert the Bf 110 Geschwader to the Me 410. However, after the Me 410 suffered equally high casualty rates, the conversion was delayed. The Bf 110 was considered to be obsolete and phased out of production accordingly. However, while crews found the Me 410 faster in "raw speed", they found it even less agile than the Bf 110 and very difficult to bail out of. The only other replacement type was the Dornier Do 335, which existed in the form of only a few airworthy prototypes at the time, still undergoing test flight programs. On 2 April 1944, the Bf 110 achieved one of its final successful engagements. A force of 62 attacked a mixed bomber stream of B-17 and B-24s with R4M rockets, destroying five B-17s and three B-24s, as well as a single P-38 Lightning. Losses were eight Bf 110s. On 9 April, ZG 76 committed 77 to an USAAF raid on Berlin. USAAF P-51 Mustangs had now appeared, and were able to escort the Allied bombers to and from the target. The Bf 110 force lost 23 of the 77 machines. It never flew another mission in this capacity. The losses had "marked the beginning of the end of the Bf 110 Zerstörer as a first-line weapon in the RLV". The Zerstörer was only to fly as a day fighter against unescorted formations. This would be rare throughout the remainder of the war.

== Night fighter operations ==
The Bf 110 would be the backbone of the Nachtjagdgeschwader throughout the conflict. The first units undertook defence operations over Germany as early as the autumn of 1940. Opposition was light until 1942, when British heavy bombers started to appear.

One of the most notable actions of the Bf 110 occurred on the night of the 17/18 August 1943. Some Bf 110 units had been equipped with the experimental Schräge Musik system, an emplacement of two upward-firing cannon, which for its initial installations placed the twin-cannon fitment almost midway down the cockpit canopy behind the pilot, which could attack the blind spot of RAF Bomber Command's Lancaster and Halifax bombers, which lacked a ventral turret. Using this, NJG 5's Leutnant Peter Erhardt destroyed four bombers in 30 minutes. Despite excellent visibility, none of the RAF bombers had reported anything unusual that would indicate a new weapon or tactics in the German night fighter force. This ignorance was compounded by the tracerless ammunition used by the Bf 110s, as well as firing on the British bombers blind spots. Many RAF crews witnessed a sudden explosion of a friendly aircraft, but assumed, in some cases, it was very accurate flak. Few of the German fighters were seen, let alone fired on. Later on, as the specialist Bf 110G-4s were received by night fighter wings, the mid-cockpit mount was replaced by one at the extreme rear of the cabin.

In September 1943, Arthur Harris, convinced that a strategic bombing campaign against Germany's cities would force a German collapse, pressed for further mass attacks. While RAF Bomber Command destroyed Hannover's city centre and 86% of crews dropped their bombs within 5 km (3 mi) of the aiming point, losses were severe. The Ruhr Area was the prime target for British bombers in 1943, and German defences inflicted a considerable loss rate. The Bf 110 had a hand in the destruction of some 2,751 RAF bombers in 1943, along with German flak and other night fighters. Later, the RAF developed a radar countermeasure; Window, to blind German radar and introduced de Havilland Mosquitos to fly feints and divert the Bf 110s and other night fighter forces from their true target, which worked, initially. At this time, the Bf 110 remained the backbone of the night force, although it was now being reinforced by the Junkers Ju 88.

In October 1943, General Josef Kammhuber reported the climbing attrition rate as "unacceptable", and urged Hermann Göring to stop committing the German night fighters to daylight operations. Many Nachtjagdgeschwader had taken part in costly daylight battles of attrition. From June–August, it had increased from around 2% to 9.8%. However, the fortunes for the mostly Bf 110 equipped force turned during late August/September 1943. The night fighter arm claimed the destruction of 123 out of some 1,179 bombers over Hamburg on one night; a 7.2% loss rate. During the Battle of Berlin, 1,128 bombers were lost in five months. RAF Bomber Command had "nearly burned out". These losses were primarily a result of fighter defences, at the heart of which was the Bf 110. The German defences had won a victory which prevented deep penetration raids for a time. But Luftwaffe losses were high; 15% of crews were killed in the first three months of 1944.
