= Grendon Underwood =

Village in Buckinghamshire, England

Coordinates: 51.8832°N 1.0173°W

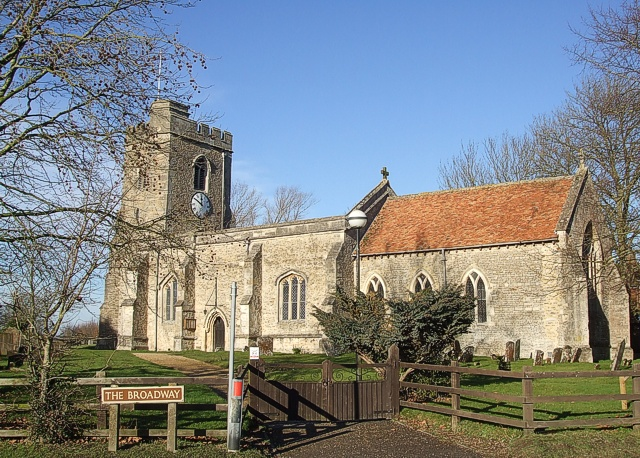
- St. Leonard's parish church

- Location within Buckinghamshire
- Population: 1,625 (2011)
- OS grid reference: SP685205
  - London: 46.2 miles (74.4 km) SE
- Civil parish: Grendon Underwood
- Unitary authority: Buckinghamshire
- Ceremonial county: Buckinghamshire
- Region: South East
- Country: England
- Sovereign state: United Kingdom
- Post town: AYLESBURY
- Postcode district: HP18
- Dialling code: 01296
- Police: Thames Valley
- Fire: Buckinghamshire
- Ambulance: South Central
- UK Parliament: Mid Buckinghamshire
- Website: Grendon Underwood

Grendon Underwood is a village and civil parish in west Buckinghamshire, England, near the border with Oxfordshire. The village sits between Woodham and Edgcott, near the Roman road Akeman Street (now part of the A41), and around 10 miles (16 km) north-west of Aylesbury. At the 2011 Census, the population of the civil parish was 1,625.

== History ==
The toponym is derived from the Old English for 'green hill near a wood', though the 'Underwood' part of the name was only added in the medieval period to differentiate the village from nearby Long Crendon and to signify the village's position close to the Bernwood Forest. The Domesday Book of 1086 records the village as Grennedone. The manor of Grendon anciently belonged to the St Amand family. Almeric de St Amand of this family was one of the godfathers of King Edward I, who was baptised in 1239.

In 1642, Grendon Underwood lay on the forest tracks used by gypsies and strolling players (travelling performers) and was visited more than once by William Shakespeare, who stayed at the house, formerly an inn, now known as Shakespeare House, currently (2012) a five star guest house and Grade II listed, part Elizabethan former coaching inn. Built in 1906, Grendon Underwood Junction was the point at Greatmoor, just east of Grendon Underwood village, at which the Alternative Route of the London Extension of the Great Central Railway left the original main line. This was a little north of the former Quainton Road railway station. The lines were closed to passenger trains in 1966 but subsequently used by freight trains.

During the Second World War Grendon Hall was Station 53a of the Special Operations Executive (SOE).

Sofie Magdalene Dahl, the mother of author Roald Dahl, moved with her daughters into a cottage in Grendon Underwood after they were bombed out of their home in Bexley, Kent during the Blitz. When Roald returned home from Royal Air Force duty in Greece and Palestine in the autumn of 1941, he at first had no idea where to find his family. Their eventual reunion is described by Dahl on the last page of his autobiography Going Solo.

== Current village ==
The Church of England parish church of Saint Leonard dates from the 12th or early 13th century. The village has a public house and restaurant, "The Swan". Grendon Underwood Combined School is a community school with about 180 pupils. The village has a single village shop. The Grendon Garage operated in the village until 2015, when it relocated to Tingewick, near Buckingham. The former premises were demolished for redevelopment.

Grendon Underwood once bordered Bernwood Forest, the nearest remnants of which are now Grendon and Doddershall Woods, which are detached from the village itself by approx 500 metres. Both woods are now silvicultural and classified as ancient forest and are sites of special scientific interest (SSSI's). This offers protected status to some of the endangered species of animals residing therein such as Bechstein's bats, and nightingales. There are also 35 species of butterflies such as purple emperor, brown hairstreak, black hairstreak, wood white, the silver washed fritillary, high brown fritillary, marsh fritillary, pearl-bordered fritillary and small pearly-bordered fritillary.

== Grendon prisons ==
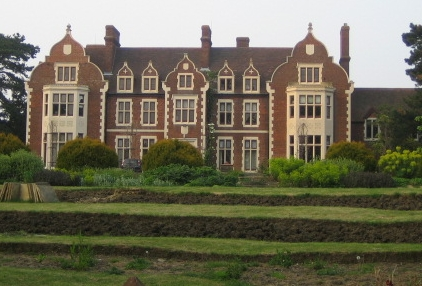

Grendon Underwood has two prisons, located adjacently, one mile north of the church and main village. The B-Category men's prison HMP Grendon is the UK's only therapeutic community for the treatment of serious offenders. HMP Grendon opened in 1962 as an experimental prison for inmates with psychiatric antisocial personality disorder. The facility holds approx 200 prisoners (2025). HMP Spring Hill is a D-Category men's open prison with an operational capacity of 330 (2025). The prison building, Springhill House, was a former MI6 Secret Service base during the Second World War.

== The Grendon Festival (GrendON) ==
This a Biennial event was held every two years from 2006 until 2014. It had live music, comedians and a CAMRA supported real ale festival. The Grendon festival had a series of live tribute bands such as Kazabian, Noasis, Killerz, and Kings of Lyon, national and local bands such as Stoke Mandville Band, 48Krash. The festival started out in 2006 with 300 people attending. In 2010 it attracted 2,000 and in 2012 organisers expected 4,000 attendees. However the event was postponed in May 2012 due to severe flooding and was successfully rescheduled to September 2012. The event was down-scaled for 2014 to include just 2 acts: "The Vinyls" and "Not the Rolling Stones", the event was planned with a mega-festival format in 2016, but was once again postponed.
