= Sophus Baagoe =

German World War II fighter pilot (1915–1941)

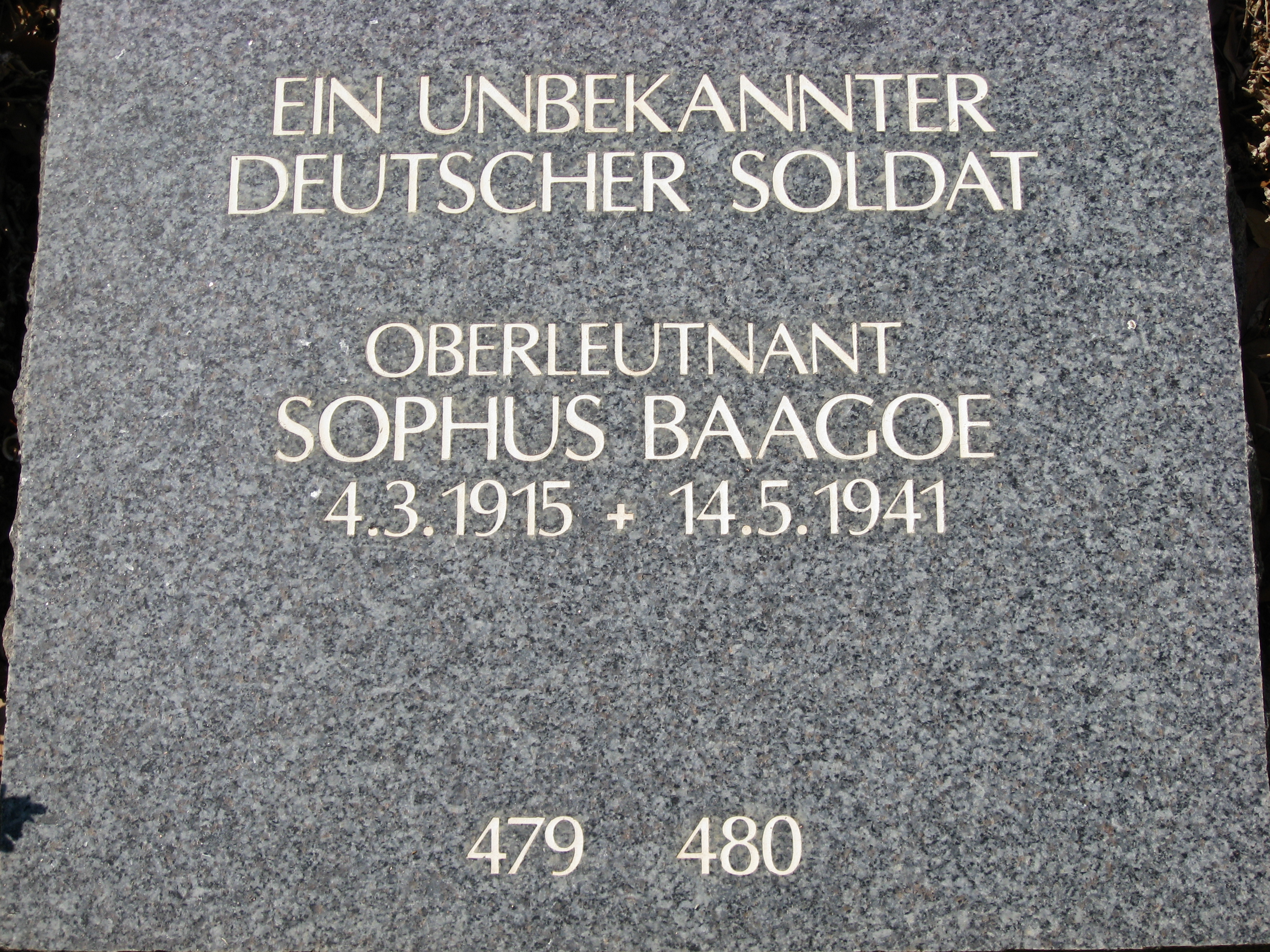
- His grave in Maleme
- Born: 4 March 1915; Flensburg, Germany
- Died: 14 May 1941 (aged 26); Heraklion, Greece
- Cause of death: Killed in action
- Burial place: German War Cemetery Maleme (Block 1—Grave 480)
- Military career
- Allegiance: Nazi Germany
- Branch: Luftwaffe
- Rank: Oberleutnant (First Lieutenant)
- Unit: ZG 26
- Conflicts: See battles World War II: Battle of France; Battle of Britain; Kanalkampf; Battle of Greece; Battle of Crete †
- Awards: Knight's Cross of the Iron Cross

Sophus Baagoe (4 March 1915 – 14 May 1941) was a German fighter pilot in the Luftwaffe and fought during World War II. Baagoe was credited with fourteen aerial victories, making him a fighter ace. A fighter ace is a military aviator credited with shooting down five or more enemy aircraft during aerial combat.

Born in Flensburg, Baagoe joined the Luftwaffe and was trained as a fighter pilot. He was assigned to Zerstörergeschwader 26 "Horst Wessel" (ZG 26—26th Destroyer Wing) and flew his first missions during the "Phoney War" period on the Channel Front. He claimed his first aerial victory during the Battle of France on 12 May 1940. He then participated in the Battle of Britain before transferring to the Mediterranean Front. On 20 April 1941, Baagoe became one of the pilots credited with shooting down the top Royal Air Force ace Marmaduke Pattle. On 14 May, Baagoe was shot down and killed in action at Heraklion, Crete. Posthumously, he was awarded the Knight's Cross of the Iron Cross.

== Early life and career ==
Baagoe was born on 4 March 1915 in Flensburg, in the Province of Schleswig-Holstein of the German Empire. Following flight training, he was posted to Zerstörergeschwader 26 "Horst Wessel" (ZG 26—26th Destroyer Wing) where he was assigned to the 8. Staffel (8th squadron). The Staffel was under the command of Oberleutnant Karl-Heinz Meyer and subordinated to III. Gruppe (3rd group) of ZG 26 headed by Hauptmann Johann Schalk. Initially, this Gruppe was equipped with the Messerschmitt Bf 109 D-1 single engine fighter.

== World War II ==
World War II in Europe began on Friday 1 September 1939 when German forces invaded Poland. At the time, III. Gruppe was based at Neumünster where they were tasked with flying fighter protection over northwestern Germany during the "Phoney War" period. On 25 September, the Gruppe was renamed and became Jagdgruppe 126 (JGr. 126—126th Fighter Group) and moved to Krefeld Airfield in December. On 4 February 1940, JGr. 126 was ordered to Dortmund Airfield where they were reequipped with the Messerschmitt Bf 110, a twin engine heavy fighter, and again became the III. Gruppe of ZG 26.

Bagagoe participated in the Battle of France, where he claimed his first aerial victory on 12 May 1940. His opponent may have been Adjudant Piere Déchanet from Groupe de Chasse III/1 of the Armée de l'Air (French Air Force) flying a Morane-Saulnier M.S.406 fighter. In total, Baagoe was credited with four aerial victories during the Battle of France, including two Royal Air Force (RAF) Hawker Hurricane fighters.

=== Battle of Britain ===
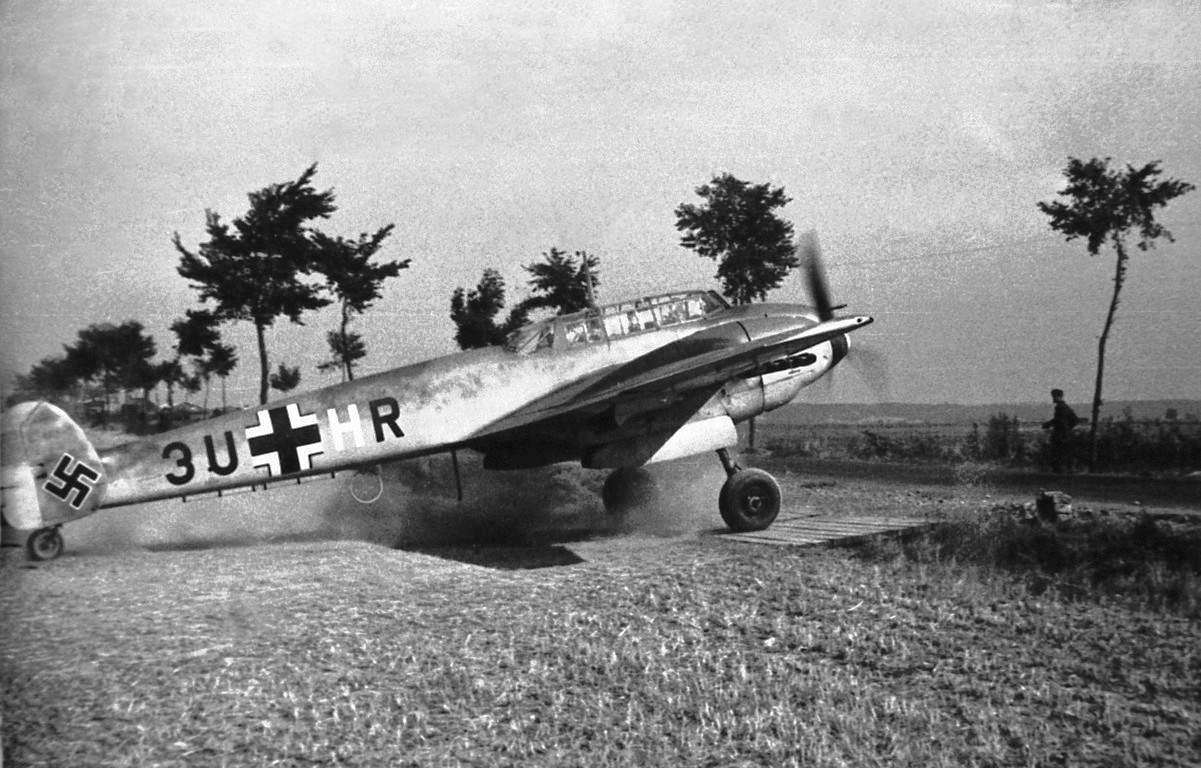
A Bf 110 from III./ZG 26, similar to those flown by Baagoe

Baagoe claimed nine more during the Battle of Britain against the RAF, bringing his total to thirteen. In July, the Luftwaffe conducted air operations against British shipping and the RAF over the English Channel referred to as Kanalkampf. On 10 July, Convoy "Bread" was attacked by the Luftwaffe bombers from Kampfgeschwader 2 (KG 2—2nd Bomber Wing), escorted by fighters from III. Gruppe of ZG 26. The Luftwaffe bombers and fighters came under attack from RAF fighters of No. 56 or No. 74 Squadron. In this encounter, Baagoe claimed two aerial victories.

On 29 July, Erprobungsgruppe 210, an experimental unit evaluating the Bf 110 in a ground attack role, attacked Convoy "Cat" off Harwich. The Bf 110 assault aircraft were intercepted by Hurricane fighters from No. 151 Squadron. The Hurricane fighters however were fended off by 8. Staffel of ZG 26 and Baagoe was credited with one of the Hurricane fighters shot down. On 18 August, a day that was later referred to as The Hardest Day, the Luftwaffe made an all-out effort to destroy RAF Fighter Command. Supporting this offensive operation, III. Gruppe flew combat air patrol missions. This resulted in fifteen aerial victories claimed for the loss of one of their own, including two Supermarine Spitfire fighters claimed by Baagoe. His 12th aerial victory was claimed on 3 September, probably over fighters from No. 229 or No. 238 Squadron.

=== Balkans campaign and death ===
ZG 26 relocated to southeast Europe in 1941. There, III. Gruppe supported the German invasion of Yugoslavia from 6 April 1941. Following the collapse of the Yugoslav Army, ZG 26 and all its Gruppen moved to support the German forces in the Battle of Greece in the fighter and fighter-bomber role. On 20 April 1941, Baagoe claimed a Hurricane fighter shot down over Athens, an aerial battle later named the Battle of Athens by Roald Dahl. That day, 10 Bf 110 fighters from 5. Staffel of ZG 26 encountered 15 Hurricane fighters from No. 33 and No. 80 Squadron, flying from Eleusis. The Bf 110 fighters were returning from a fighter escort mission to their airbase at Larissa when they were surprised by the RAF fighters. Both sides lost four aircraft each. In this encounter, Baagoe may have shot down the RAF top ace Marmaduke Pattle from No. 33 Squadron. It is also possible that Luftwaffe pilot Theodor Rossiwall shot down Pattle.

Baagoe and his aerial gunner, Oberfeldwebel Daniel Becker, were killed in action on 14 May 1941 during the prelude of the Battle of Crete, shot down in their Bf 110 D-3 (Werknummer 4290—factory number). There is some dispute over how Baagoe died; he was either killed by anti-aircraft fire from the ground or by RAF pilots. He may have been shot down by the New Zealand Gloster Gladiator pilot Derrick Fitzgerald Westenra of No. 112 Squadron. Baagoe was posthumously awarded the Knight's Cross of the Iron Cross (Ritterkreuz des Eisernen Kreuzes) on 14 June 1941. He was the only Knight's Cross recipient of Balkans campaign.

== Summary of career ==
=== Aerial victory claims ===
Baagoe was credited with fourteen aerial victories claimed in an unknown number of combat missions, all of which claimed over the Western Allies. Mathews and Foreman, authors of Luftwaffe Aces — Biographies and Victory Claims, researched the German Federal Archives and found records for 14 aerial victory claims. This figure includes two claims over the Armée de l'Air and twelve over the RAF.

Chronicle of aerial victories
| Claim | Date | Time | Type | Location | Claim | Date | Time | Type | Location |
– 8. Staffel of Zerstörergeschwader 26 – Battle of France — 10 May – 25 June 1940
| 1 | 12 May 1940 | 08:40 | M.S.406 | Wachtebeke | 3 | 27 May 1940 | 16:10 | Hurricane | Dunkirk |
| 2 | 27 May 1940 | 16:03 | Hurricane | Dunkirk | 4 | 3 June 1940 | 14:47 | Hawk 75 | Château-Thierry |
– 8. Staffel of Zerstörergeschwader 26 – Battle of Britain and on the English Channel — 10 July – 31 October 1940
| 5 | 10 July 1940 | 15:04 | Spitfire | southwest of Dover | 10 | 31 August 1940 | 09:37 | Spitfire | southeast of Duxford |
| 6 | 10 July 1940 | 15:10 | Spitfire | southwest of Dover | 11 | 3 September 1940 | 11:20 | Spitfire | north of Southend-on-Sea |
| 7 | 29 July 1940 | 18:24 | Hurricane | south of Harwich | 12 | 3 September 1940 | 11:28 | Spitfire | north of Southend-on-Sea |
| 8 | 18 August 1940 | 14:24 | Spitfire | Kenley | 13 | 26 September 1940 | 17:37 | Spitfire | Southampton |
| 9 | 18 August 1940 | 14:30 | Spitfire | Kenley | | | | | |
– 5. Staffel of Zerstörergeschwader 26 – Mediterranean and Balkans — 6 April – 14 May 1941
| 14 | 20 April 1941 | — | Hurricane | vicinity of Athens | | | | | |

=== Awards ===
- Iron Cross (1939)
  - 2nd Class (13 May 1940)
  - 1st Class (30 June 1940)
- Knight's Cross of the Iron Cross on 14 June 1941 as Oberleutnant and pilot in the 5./Zerstörergeschwader 26 "Horst Wessel"
