= Pat Pattle =

South African born World War II Flying ace for the RAF

Marmaduke Pattle
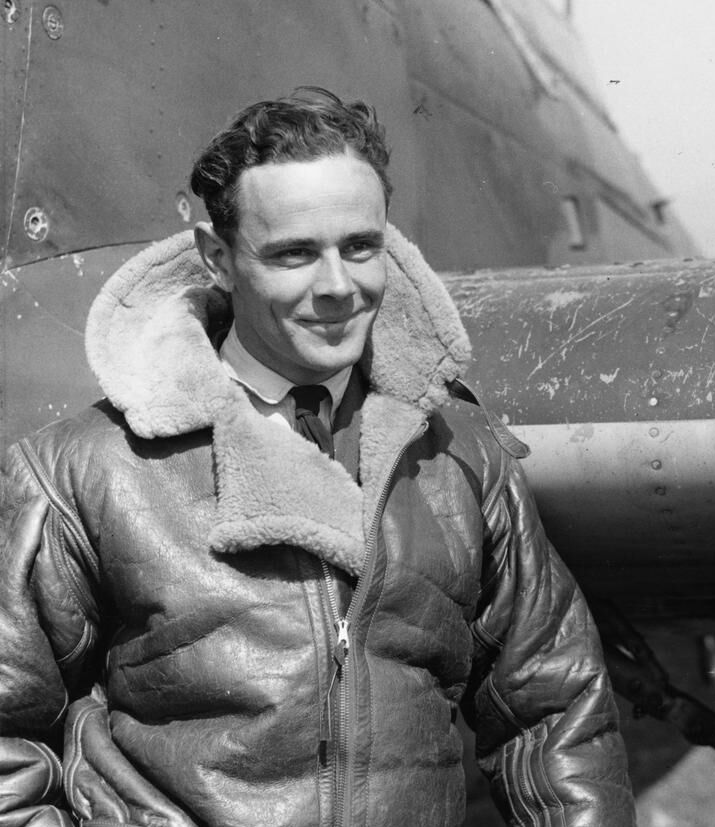
- Pattle, while serving with No. 33 Squadron RAF, in 1941
- Born: 3 July 1914; Butterworth, South Africa
- Died: 20 April 1941 (aged 26); Piraeus Harbor, off Piraeus, Kingdom of Greece
- Cause of death: Killed in action
- Burial place: No known grave
- Military career
- Allegiance: United Kingdom
- Branch: Royal Air Force
- Service years: 1936–1941
- Rank: Squadron leader
- Nickname: "Pat"
- Units: No. 80 Squadron RAF; No. 33 Squadron RAF
- Conflicts: Second World War: Western Desert campaign; Greco-Italian War; Invasion of Yugoslavia; Battle of Greece; Battle of Athens †
- Awards: Distinguished Flying Cross & Bar

Marmaduke Thomas St John Pattle, DFC & Bar (3 July 1914 – 20 April 1941), usually known as Pat Pattle, was a South African-born English Second World War fighter pilot and flying ace (an aviator credited with the destruction of five or more enemy aircraft in aerial combat) of the Royal Air Force (RAF).

Pattle applied to join the South African Air Force at 18, but was rejected. He travelled to the United Kingdom and joined the RAF in 1936 on a Short Service Commission. Pattle was a pilot by 1937 and was posted to No. 80 Squadron based in Egypt upon the outbreak of war in September 1939. In June 1940, Italy entered the war on the side of the Axis powers and he began combat operations against the Regia Aeronautica (Italian Air Force), gaining his first successes during the Italian invasion of Egypt.

After the Italian invasion, his squadron was sent to Greece in November 1940, where Pattle achieved most of his victories. Pattle claimed around 20 aircraft shot down and in March 1941 was promoted to squadron leader. After the German intervention, and in fourteen days of operations, Pattle claimed victories 24–50. Pattle claimed five or more aircraft destroyed in one day on three occasions, which qualified him for ace in a day status. Pattle achieved his greatest success on 19 April 1941, claiming six victories. The following day, having claimed more aerial victories than any other Western Allied pilot, he took off against orders, while suffering from a high temperature, to engage German aircraft near Athens. He was last seen battling Messerschmitt Bf 110 heavy fighters. His Hurricane crashed into the sea during this dogfight and Pattle was killed.

Pattle is sometimes noted as being the highest-scoring British Commonwealth pilot of the war. If all claims made for him are correct, his total could have been more than 51. It can be stated that his final total was at least 40 and could exceed this number. Log-books and semi-official records suggest this figure, while personnel attached to his squadron suspect the figure to be closer to 60. A total of 26 of Pattle's victims were Italian; 15 were downed with Gloster Gladiators, the rest with Hawker Hurricanes. He is considered to be the highest-scoring ace on both Gladiator and Hurricane (35 victories) fighters.

== Early years ==
=== Childhood and education ===
Pattle was born in Butterworth, Cape Province, on 3 July 1914, the son of South African-born parents of English descent, Sergeant-Major Cecil William John "Jack" Pattle (b. 5 September 1884) and Edith Brailsford (1881–1962). Marmaduke was named after his paternal grandfather, Captain Thomas Marmaduke Pattle, who resigned his commission in the Royal Horse Artillery and emigrated to South Africa from England in 1875. Thomas became the first military magistrate of Butterworth. Jack Pattle followed his father into the British Army at the age of 15. He fought in the Second Boer War and the Natal Rebellion. Afterwards, he studied law and became a civilian attorney. Jack Pattle met Edith Brailsford in 1909. Brailsford was an English nurse who had lived in South Africa since the age of five. Jack Pattle and Edith Brailsford married in 1912. Within two years, two sons had been born, Cecil and Marmaduke.

As a child, Marmaduke was academically gifted and also a keen boxer and long-distance swimmer. He also took a keen interest in mechanical things, particularly combustion engines, and was building Meccano models of aircraft and other vehicles by the age of 12. In his early teens, he became an avid amateur mechanic, fixing the family motor car and learning to drive. Marmaduke was never a hard worker and did not embark upon an academic career, but was considered to possess above average intelligence. In 1929, he passed the Junior Certificate Exam with first class honours. The certificate qualified him for Victoria Boy's High School from which he graduated in 1931.

Although he had considered a career as a mining engineer, Pattle sent in an application to join the South African Air Force in 1932 and was employed in menial jobs while waiting for a response. For several months, he worked at a petrol station owned by an uncle.

=== Military service ===
On 22 March 1933 he was invited for an interview for a commission in the Air Force in Pretoria. One of 30 applicants vying for three places, he was rejected for lack of flying experience. Determined to rectify this weakness, he went to Johannesburg and began taking flying lessons. To fund his new ambition, he worked for a mining company, Sheba Gold Mine. He enjoyed the work so much he considered studying for a degree in mining engineering. His passion for flying subsided, but an impromptu visit by a transport aircraft gave Pattle a close glimpse of it, which rekindled his interest. At around the same time, the Ministry of Defence created the Special Service Battalion to employ South African youth who were struggling to find work because of the Great Depression. He joined up in 1936 hoping it would lead to a career in the Air Force. He undertook basic training and national service on the understanding that he would be given an opportunity to enter the Air Force as an instructor at the end of his four-year service.

Pattle worked toward this goal for some time until, in March 1936 he read in the Johannesburg Star newspaper, an advertisement from the Royal Air Force (RAF) offering five-year short service commissions for cadets throughout the British Empire. The RAF expansion schemes required a great influx of capable personnel into the organisation as rearmament and the need for fighting men heightened. Pattle decided that a career in the RAF offered better prospects than as an instructor in South Africa and applied. After an interview with an RAF Recruiting Officer in South Africa, he was offered a place at the selection board in London, England. After purchasing his discharge from the SSB, with some help from his mother and uncle he embarked from East London, South Africa aboard SS Llandovery Castle on 30 April 1936.

== RAF career ==
Pattle was assigned to a civil flying school at RAF Prestwick which was run by Scottish Aviation Limited. He formally began his training on 29 June 1936. He progressed well in his theory examinations, gaining 99 percent for gunnery and 91 percent for airmanship. He flew a single-engined De Havilland Tiger Moth training biplane and gained his A Licence at the end of July, partly because he was a capable pilot and also because the Air Ministry was anxious to produce trained pilots. He completed his training within two months and was classified as above average after passing his examination with ease. Pattle was give the service number 39029.

Pattle was sent to No. 10 Elementary Flying School at RAF Ternhill in Shropshire. He spent three months with the Initial Training Squadron and three further months with the Advanced Training Squadron. On 24 August 1936, he became an acting pilot officer. In November, he passed his technical exams, achieving 98 percent in aero engine mechanics and 96 percent in meteorology while scoring 95 percent in applied mechanics. The basic flight training came to an end and Pattle scored 88.5 percent. His advanced training began in November 1936 on the Gloster Gauntlet. He completed his training somewhat later than planned, in March 1937, owing to bad weather which curtailed flying. He was rated as "exceptional" in his final report.

Pattle joined No. 80 Squadron RAF. The squadron was in the midst of re-forming at RAF Kenley and he was able to fly the Gloster Gladiator fighter for the first time in May 1937. In June, the unit moved to RAF Debden. Here, they practised aerial combat against RAF Bomber Command squadrons which staged mock raids against London. During these exercises, he mastered deflection shooting. Pattle developed his own air tactics. He preferred attacking at higher altitudes than his quarry, meeting head-on, then waiting for the enemy to fly by before rolling over and diving to attack from the side and rear of the enemy. He usually held his fire until very close to the target to make sure of hitting his opponent. His qualities as an officer led to him being promoted to squadron adjutant. A gifted flyer and natural marksman, he took pains to improve both talents, doing exercises to improve his distance vision and sharpen his reflexes. He progressed in rank with the squadron and was duly promoted to pilot officer on 27 July 1937.

On 29 April 1938, Pattle accompanied the unit to Egypt having been tasked with the defence of the Suez Canal. While in Egypt, Pattle carried out ground attack duties against Arab rebels. He fired on the enemy several times as local rebellions against British rule took shape and then died away.

== Second World War ==
=== North African campaign ===
Following the outbreak of war, the unit, flying the Gloster Gladiator, moved up to the Libyan border, where in August 1940, Pattle first saw action. 80 Squadron received the order to deploy one of its flights to Sidi Barrani in anticipation of Italian air attacks. "B" Flight, commanded by Pattle, moved to the forward airfield. On 4 August 1940, Pattle claimed his first victories. While escorting a Westland Lysander, Pattle and his flight engaged first a force of six Breda Ba.65/A80s of the 159^{a} Squadriglia ("squadron") and six Fiat CR.42 quarters of the 160^{a} Squadriglia. Pattle claimed a Breda, but was then attacked by the escorting Fiat CR.42s. He managed to hit one, that he saw falling spinning, but later was himself attacked by another formation of Bredas and CR.42s. The Bredas dived and delivered attacks from the quarter and beam. Pattle avoided them by turning away and opening fire on the nearest target as they dived past to gain speed, climbed, and then engaged Pattle again. The Gladiator's guns jammed one by one, leaving him without any form of defence, other than bluff attacks. After 15 minutes of battle, while avoiding one enemy fighter, he flew into the line of sight of another and was hit. Pattle's rudder controls were shot away, so he climbed to 400 ft (120 m) and bailed out.

He was probably shot down by Italian Spanish Civil War ace Tenente (Lieutenant) Franco Lucchini of 90^{a} Squadriglia, 10° Gruppo ("group"), 4° Stormo ("wing"). He landed, winded, and played dead to avoid being strafed. He started to walk towards the Allied lines and crossed the border at around midday the following day. After two days, he was rescued by a detachment from the 11th Hussars, who returned him to Sidi Barrani. Pattle was annoyed. He considered being shot down by the Italians as an embarrassment and regarded the episode as a slur on his reputation. After his forced march to friendly lines, he was also determined not to get lost in the desert again so he flew to Alexandria and bought a compass which he never flew without.

On 8 August, Pattle claimed two more victories (nos 3–4). While leading 14 Gladiators of 80 Squadron in a surprise attack against 16 Fiat CR.42s from 9° and 10° Gruppi of 4° Stormo, over Gabr Saleh inside the Italian territory. Sergente (Sergeant) Rosa, Dallari and Valla bailed out and Sotto Tenente Querci, Sergente Gino and Poli force landed. One pilot, Norino Renzi, a Regia Aeronautica pilot since 25 December 1930 and a pre-war member of 4° Stormo's aerobatics group, was killed. "Shorty" Graham, Pattle's wingman that day, confirmed he saw two fall to Pattle. On 3 September 1940, Pattle was promoted to flight lieutenant.

Three days later, the Italian invasion of Egypt began. Much to Pattle's distaste, the squadron was heavily involved in close air support operations and ordered specifically to avoid air-to-air combat unless attacked. On occasion, he chanced upon Italian aircraft, but the Gladiator's limited speed denied Pattle further success. Pattle succeeded in damaging a Savoia-Marchetti S.79 bomber which emitted black smoke but dived away and Pattle could not catch it. The speed of the Savoia-Marchetti S.79 often enabled it to escape RAF fighters. The unit withdrew to Habbaniyah to re-equip with Mark II machines, but was then ordered to Greece after the Italian attack.

=== Greco-Italian War ===
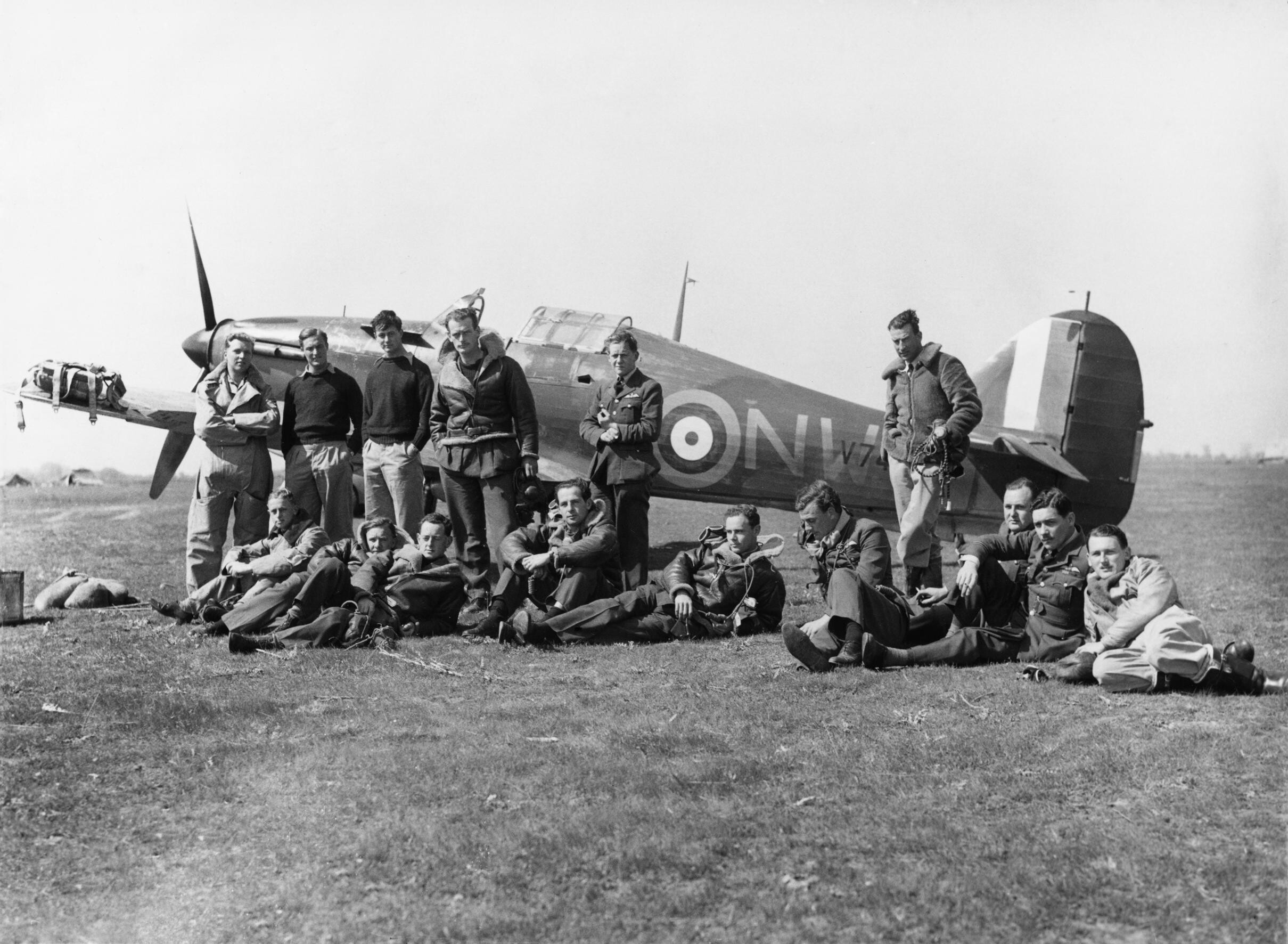
Pattle (sixth from the right, resting on his left elbow), with 33 Squadron c. 1941.

In November, the squadron was transferred to the Balkans to help the Greek Air Force oppose the Italian invasion. On 8 November, the squadron and its new Gladiator IIs moved from their base at Sidi Haneish to Abu Suweir. There the pilots were granted two days leave. On 16 November 1940, the squadron arrived in Athens and moved to airfields north of the capital. Pattle's aerodrome was situated at Eleusis. They stayed to organise the squadron into flights but moved to the Albanian–Greek border town of Trikkala hours later.

Here Pattle was to enjoy significant success. On 19 November 1940, Pattle with eight other pilots from 80 Squadron, attacked Fiat CR.42s and Fiat G.50bis near the Italian airfield at Korçë. In this combat, the RAF claimed nine and two probably destroyed while 160^{o} Gruppo Autonomo (Independent Group) lost three Fiat CR.42s and one damaged while 355^{a} Squadriglia, 24^{o} Gruppo Autonomo, lost one G.50. Four Italian pilots were killed, while the RAF lost a Gladiator. Pattle claimed two CR.42s in the battle — his wingman Heimar Stucky (himself wounded in action later on) witnessed both catch fire and crash in the vicinity of Korçë with the pilots killed. Pattle's guns jammed during the battle and he was forced to break off combat. Pattle also noted the inferior speed of the Gladiator against the Fiat G.50 Freccia. The Italian pilots could easily outrun the Gladiators if outnumbered. His combat reports also noted the ineffective fire of the Italians who fired and broke away from too far away. Having regained pressure in his guns, he encountered a lone G.50. He placed the Gladiator below and in front of the Italian fighter to tempt the enemy pilot, but could not persuade him to accept battle. Between 27 and 29 November, Pattle made four claims. Flying as escort for Bristol Blenheims, Pattle engaged three SM.79s and shared two destroyed with 11 other pilots. On 29 November, he claimed two shared damaged with William Vale.

On 2 December, he claimed two kills (nos 7–8). In the Gjirokastër area, Pattle shot down an IMAM Ro.37bis from 42^{a} Squadriglia, 72^{o} Gruppo, and Sergente Luigi Del Manno and his observer, Tenente Michele Milano, were both killed. In the afternoon, Pattle shot down another Ro.37bis from 72^{o}Gruppo near Përmet, killing Capitano Fuchs and Sergente Vescia. On 4 December 1940, the RAF claimed nine Fiat CR.42s destroyed and two probables. Pattle — whose own aircraft was hit in the main fuel tank and a wing strut — claimed three CR.42s plus another and a Fiat CR.42 as probable victories — he had seen two of his victims bail out. According to Italian combat records, 150° Gruppo, involved in that combat, lost just two CR.42s. Tenente Alberto Triolo and Sottotenente Paolo Penna were killed in action.

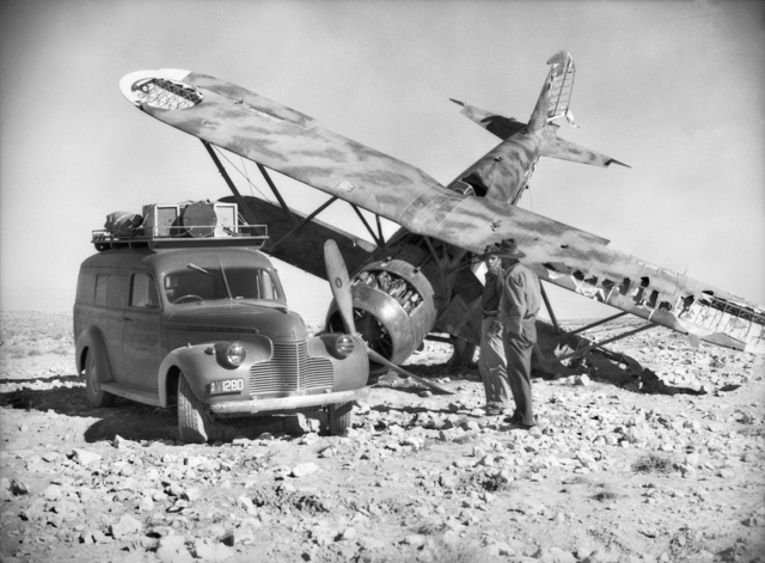
A crashed Fiat CR.42, North Africa circa 1940/41. Pattle claimed 14 of these aircraft—more than any other type.

Pattle achieved further success on 20 December 1940. On this day he achieved 12 or 13 air victories. Covering the withdrawal of Blenheims from 211 Squadron over the Kelcyre sector, he missed the rendezvous. Instead, Pattle opted to fly a patrol between Tepelene and Kelcyre. He intercepted a flight of escorted SM.79s and attacked them before the escort could react. He downed one via a head-on attack. The crew bailed out and the bomber crashed near Tepelene. Two Gladiators had been damaged and withdrew after being hit by withering return fire. Soon he spotted another formation of much slower Savoia-Marchetti SM.81. He expended all his ammunition and watched the Italian pilot attempt a crash-landing, only for the bomber to hit a tree and disintegrate 24 km (15 miles) north of Kelcyre. His victims were from 104° Gruppo and drawn from 252^{a} and 253^{a} Squadriglia. His first victims were Tenente Andrea Berlingieri and his crew, all killed. On 21 December, he downed a CR.42, but his unit lost Squadron Leader Hickey. Hickey bailed out and was shot in his parachute. Pattle also saw Pilot Officer Ripley killed. The squadron claimed several victories in return. Pattle's 15th and last kill in the Gladiator was claimed on 9 February 1941. In between these dates, on 28 January 1941, he took a third share in the destruction of a CANT Z.1007 and a half-share in a Fiat BR.20. Pattle was awarded the Distinguished Flying Cross (DFC) on 11 February 1941.

No. 80 Squadron was re-equipped with the more modern Hawker Hurricane Mk I on 20 February 1941. That day, Pattle, flying Hurricane Mk I V7724, was leading a group of six Hurricanes escorting 16 Blenheim light bombers — eight from No. 84 Squadron RAF, six from No. 211 Squadron and three from No. 30 Squadron RAF—to Berat. Fiat G.50bis from the 361^{a} and 395^{a} Squadriglia, 154° Autonomo Gruppo were scrambled from Berat airfield, but they were attacked by the higher altitude Hurricanes. Pattle led his section straight towards four Fiat G.50s and selected the leading aircraft as his own target. It was the first time he had fired the eight guns of the Hurricane, and the G.50 exploded. The Fiat G.50 was from 154° Gruppo. Tenente Livio Bassi was killed in this battle. Another CR.42 fell to Pattle on 27 February 1941 — his 17th victory. His Hurricane sustained a bullet hole in the fuel tank.

On 28 February, British pilots in Greece celebrated their biggest success in combat. No. 80 Squadron claimed 27 Italian aircraft without loss in 90 minutes of air combat. Pattle himself claimed three Fiat CR.42s shot down in less than three minutes. The Regia Aeronautica claimed that day it lost just one CR.42 (as confirmed by Italian pilot Corrado Ricci, a participant in those battles), plus four Fiat BR.20s and two G.50bis. The Italians claimed six Gladiators and one Supermarine Spitfire — none would be in the Mediterranean Theatre until March 1942 — while in fact only one Gladiator of No. 112 Squadron was lost, while two Blenheims, attacked by CR.42s had to crash-land returning to base. In a previous fight south of Vlorë, Pattle had to return to base with the windscreen covered by oil from a shot down enemy bomber. His tally was now 21 air victories. Later sources suggested two of Pattle's claim were from the 37° Stormo.

On 4 March 1941, Pattle claimed three enemy Fiat G.50bis fighters (nos 22–24) belonging to 24^{o}Gruppo. He claimed the first, while Nigel Cullen — another leading fighter ace — flew as his wingman. Escorting Blenheims to attack Italian warships, the pair were engaged by a lone G.50. Pattle engaged the Fiat and shot it down — its landing gear dropped down and it rolled over and into a mountainside just north of Himare. Pattle searched for Cullen, expecting him to be behind him but saw no sign of the Australian. He assumed Cullen had gone off to scout for more enemy aircraft after missing out on Pattle's victory. Now alone, he was attacked by another lone G.50bis while flying towards Vlorë. After a brief combat, he shot down the Fiat. It crashed into the sea southwest of Vlorë harbour. He then became involved with a third such fighter over Valona harbour and claimed to have shot this down into the sea in flames on the west side of the promontory. After his return to base, he was informed Cullen had been posted missing in action. Pattle and the squadron considered he had most likely been shot down and killed.

=== Squadron leader ===
On 12 March 1941, Pattle was promoted to squadron leader. The following day, the squadron returned to Eleusis north of Athens. There, Pattle was reassigned to No. 33 Squadron. Pattle received a Bar to his DFC on 18 March 1941, for which the citation read: "In March 1941, during an engagement over Himara Flight Lieutenant Pattle shot down three enemy fighters. This courageous and skilful fighter pilot has now destroyed at least 23 enemy aircraft".

Pattle arrived in Athens and was immediately unimpressed by No. 33 Squadron. The group was already indignant and many of the veterans believed one of their number should have been promoted instead. He gathered the pilots together and made a statement of his intent:

This is my first command. I intend to make it a successful one. You have done well in the desert, but you are not a good Squadron. A good Squadron looks smart. You are a scruffy looking lot! Your flying, by my standards, is ragged. Flying discipline starts when you start to taxi and doesn't end until you switch off your engine. In future you will taxi in formation, take off in formation, and land in formation at all times unless your aircraft has been damaged, or in an emergency.

After the lecture, Pattle took another pilot, Pilot Officer Ping Newton, up for dogfight practice. The squadron watched. They climbed to 10,000 feet, separated and then began a head-on attack so neither would have an advantage. Soon, Pattle had moved onto his tail and Ping could not shake his leader off. He criticised the pilot for being too smooth on the controls and urged his men to be rough with them in combat. Within a week, constant practice had moulded the squadron into an effective team. He impressed on his pilots one critical point about his own approach to combat:

You must be aggressive in the air but not to the extent of recklessness. Always be ready to take the initiative, but only when you have the enemy aircraft at a disadvantage. You must be ready to react instinctively in any situation and you can only do this if you are alert both physically and mentally. Good eyes and perfect co-ordination of hands and feet are essential. Flying an aeroplane in combat should be automatic. The mind must be free to think what to do; it must never be clouded with any thought on how it should be done.

On 23 March, Pattle flew his first missions with No. 33 Squadron, now based at Larissa. They flew as escort for Blenheims from No. 84 Squadron over the Pindus Mountains and Paramythia. Supported by No. 112 Squadron Gladiators, they flew to raid Berat. The cloud base was low and thick and they descended below it at 1,900 feet. The bombers attacked and two Hurricanes were badly damaged by ground fire. One of the squadron was shot down by a Fiat G.50 and bailed out — the Italians disappeared before they could retaliate. In the afternoon, he was briefed to strafe the heavily defended Fieri airfield. It was an unpopular sort of mission. At 25,000 feet, they were intercepted and a dogfight began with G.50s and Macchi C.200s. Only Pattle and one other Hurricane attacked the airfield. Furious, Pattle berated the pilots for not carrying out their primary assignment. He had claimed one enemy fighter as a probable and proceeded to the airfield to claim another victory — his 25th — and claimed another three on the ground.

=== Battle for Greece ===
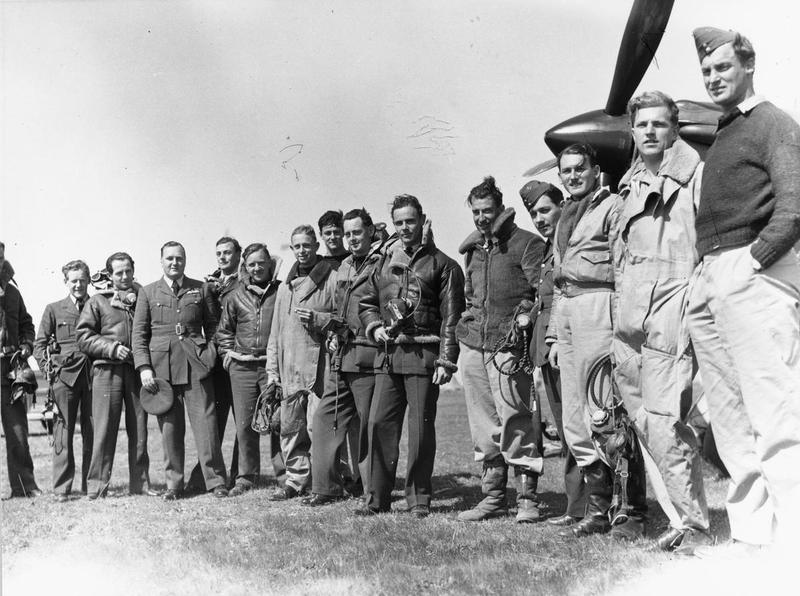
No. 33 Squadron: Pattle, (6th from right), in Greece, circa 1941. Eric Joseph Woods (not William Joseph "Timber" Woods) (9th from the right).

On 6 April 1941, Adolf Hitler resolved to end the conflict in the Balkans and subjugate Allied-sympathetic states. The Invasion of Yugoslavia began in the morning. The German Wehrmacht also intervened in Greece thus beginning the Battle of Greece. Italian failures had allowed another British foothold on the continent too close to the Romanian oilfields — Germany's ally.

No. 33 Squadron was immediately put on alert. At noon, Pattle was ordered to fly a fighter patrol over the Rupel Pass, Bulgaria, another Axis partner. Here he had his first encounter with the Luftwaffe. No. 33 Squadron attacked 20 Bf 109s and claimed five without loss. Pattle claimed two victories over Bf 109Es over the Rupel Pass —Oberleutnant Arno Becker was killed and Leutnant Klaus Faber was captured. These successes represented his 26th and 27th aerial victories. Thereafter, details vary as to his score as all records were destroyed. (Note: These claims may be a considerable overestimate, and may have indicated the claims of the squadron as a whole.)

The next day, he acted as escort for No. 11 Squadron RAF. He spotted and chased an intruder. Thirty seconds later, his colleagues saw an explosion and a CR.42 fall to the ground while Pattle rejoined them. It is believed he attacked a reconnaissance Dornier Do 17 from Sturzkampfgeschwader 2 ("dive bomber wing 2") which he claimed destroyed, though it appears it made it back to German lines damaged. On 8 April, Pattle led an attack in bad weather on Petrich in Bulgaria that destroyed enemy aircraft on the ground.

The air war intensified after a period of bad weather and the Luftwaffe began exerting severe pressure on communications and Allied ground forces. On 9 April, Pattle claimed a Junkers Ju 88 (actually a Do 17) damaged. He left the burning machine as it disappeared into cloud. Pattle received confirmation that the aircraft crashed and he drove out with a member of the squadron to bring back souvenirs. On 10 April, he flew as fighter escort for No. 11 Squadron Blenheims on a mission over Betjol, Yugoslavia. They were attacked by flights of Messerschmitt Bf 110s and Bf 109s. Pattle shot down a Bf 110 which was seen to crash in flames and a Bf 109 whose pilot bailed out. On Good Friday, Pattle led his squadron into battle against German bombers minelaying over Volos harbour. He dispatched a Ju 88 and Heinkel He 111 into the sea. These were his 33rd and 34th aerial victories.

Pattle's success in the air was overshadowed by events on the ground. The Allied forces were routed at Vevi and the Battle of the Metaxas Line had ended in total defeat for the Greek Army on 9 April. Covering the Greek forces from Larissa, Pattle claimed another Do 17 and SM.79 along with a Bf 109 damaged for his 35th and 36th aerial victories. Interceptions would now be more difficult for the port of Salonika fell. Observers at the port had been able to telephone his operations hut to warn him of approaching enemy aircraft over Mount Olympus. Pattle had to send pairs of fighters to patrol the area, which helped act as a rudimentary warning system. The effect was that there was little warning of impending attacks. The Germans, now operating from forward airfields, slipped through unnoticed. On 13 April, Pattle saw 15 Bf 109s strafe the airfield as three Hurricanes took off. Two veteran pilots were killed in the very brief battle in exchange for two Bf 109s. Pattle searched for the Hurricane pilots and found one fighter with a parachute beside it but no pilot. One of the German pilots bailed out and Pattle watched in horror as Greek soldiers guarding the airfield shot him dead as he floated down in his parachute. One of the Bf 109s crash-landed perfectly. He ordered that no-one should approach the Bf 109 in case it was rigged with explosives. The pilot was likely Hans-Jakob Arnoldy.

Pattle claimed four victories during five sorties on 14 April. One Bf 109, one Ju 88 and a Bf 110 were claimed as destroyed. His final victory was an Italian SM.79 in the afternoon. The day took his tally to 40 enemy aircraft. As the wreckage of some old Greek aircraft and a captured SM.79 was being cleared up after the attack on 13 April, John D'Albiac, Air Officer Commanding British Forces in Greece, arrived to warn him of the Allied collapse in the north. After seeing the AOC off in a Lysander aircraft escorted by five squadron Hurricanes, Pattle evacuated his squadron to Eleusis.

During the journey, Pattle developed a fever and high temperature. Nevertheless, on 19 April he took to the skies in several missions. By this date, Pattle's fever had metamorphosed into influenza and his condition had worsened. He did not want his squadron to know he was unwell. Pattle feared the effect it would have on morale and vowed to continue flying. The officer commanding No. 80 Squadron, Tap Jones, visited Pattle the day before and noticed he was very gaunt, drawn and that he had lost weight. Jones helped the weakened Pattle change into his flying gear. Jones was acting wing commander, but did not ban Pattle from operations. Pattle claimed six victories this day — three Ju 88s and three Bf 109s — plus one Henschel Hs 126 shared and two probables (a Ju 88 and a Bf 109). The battle with the Bf 109s took place over Eleusis and Tanagra airfields. He engaged III./Jagdgeschwader 77 (Fighter Wing 77 or JG 77) in a head-on position and executed an Immelmann turn which took him behind and above the Messerschmitts and allowed him to claim three of them shot down. No. 33 Squadron claimed four Bf 109s (three were lost). Among the victims was the German ace, Kurt Ubben. Ubben landed in Allied territory and was picked up by a Fieseler Fi 156, escaping to his own lines.

==== Death over Piraeus Harbour ====
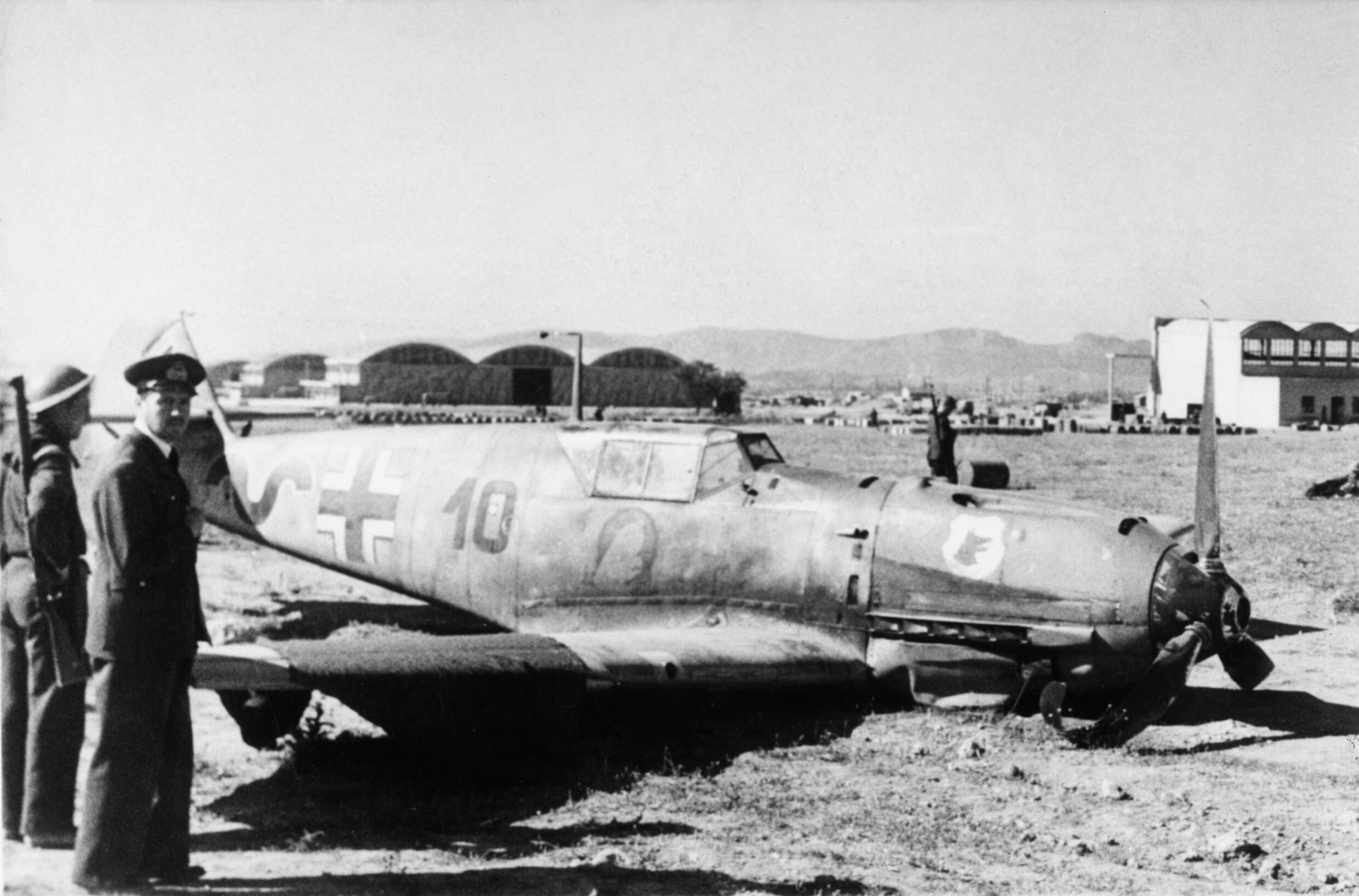
A JG 77 Bf 109: believed to be Pattle's 47th victim. Unteroffizier Fritz Borchert was captured.

By dawn on 20 April 1941, the Germans were well aware that British and Allied forces had begun preliminary withdrawal operations from ports in southern Greece. The Luftwaffe made substantial attacks against these departure points in a bid to prevent or forestall an evacuation. On Sunday 20 April, the Luftwaffe mounted mass attacks against Allied shipping in Piraeus Harbour. At roughly 05:00, large formations appeared over the capital, Athens. The remaining Allied fighter units in the area committed themselves to defending the Allied ships in what became known as "the Battle of Athens". Fifteen Hawker Hurricanes, the entire Allied air presence in Greece at the time, participated in a series of defensive missions over Athens.

Pattle had flown several patrols that morning and was suffering from a high temperature and fever. He had downed a Ju 88 and two Bf 109s on morning missions. One of his victims, a Bf 109 from III./JG 77 crash-landed at Larissa. His success took Pattle's total from 47 to 49. At 17:00, another raid approached. Pattle was seen lying on a couch in the mess, shivering under blankets, just before an air raid alarm. While being briefed on an intended mission behind enemy lines, around 100 German bombers with fighter escort approached Athens to attack Allied shipping. Pattle ran towards a Hurricane despite the efforts of his adjutant, George Rumsey, to stop him. On the way to his fighter he was almost killed by a strafing Bf 110. Pattle took off and headed for Piraeus Harbour at 20,000 feet.

At this time, other Hurricanes were already in action with Bf 110s from Zerstörergeschwader 26 (ZG 26). The Irish-born ace Joseph 'Timber' Woods (of 80 Squadron, distinct from Eric Joseph Woods who was flying in the same campaign in 33 Squadron) attacked a formation of Bf 110s positioned above him. One of the Bf 110s dived on the RAF pilot. Pattle dived toward the Bf 110 and shot it down in flames, but only after it had shot down the Hurricane. Woods died when his fighter crashed into the harbour. Pattle climbed and fired into another Bf 110, avoiding a collision with a third. No RAF pilot saw Pattle die for certain. Jimmy 'Kettle' Kettlewell, one of Pattle's unit, arrived on the scene moments after Pattle had scored his victory. He saw a lone Hurricane diving towards the sea, its pilot slumped forward over the controls and flames engulfing the engine compartment. Two Bf 110s were firing at it. He shot down one of them and it hit the sea at the same time as the Hurricane — the victory was Kettlewell's fifth, making him an ace. It is possible his victim was one of two 5./ZG 26 Bf 110s that were lost: Bf 110E (Werknummer 4272—factory number), Oberfeldwebel Georg Leinfelder and Unteroffizier Franz Beckel who were killed in action or Bf 110E (Werknummer 4299), Oberleutnant Kurt Specka and Günther Frank. A third Bf 110 crash-landed with severe damage. Kettlewell was shot down and wounded in the same battle.

It is not known who killed Pattle. Records show that Staffelkapitän Hauptmann Theodor Rossiwall and Oberleutnant Sophus Baagoe were credited with kills against Hurricanes that day, taking their scores to 12 and 14 respectively. Baagoe was killed in action on 14 May 1941. Three other German pilots also made claims after the battle. An 80 Squadron pilot involved in the battle, Roald Dahl, said five Hurricanes were lost in several air battles that day, with Pattle and three other pilots killed.

== List of victories ==
While most of Pattle's victories were claimed while flying Hurricanes, at least 15 were downed in Gladiators. His claims included 26 Italian aircraft.

Pattle was provisionally credited with 50 air victories (and two shared), seven (and one shared) probable victories, and four (and two shared) damaged. It is likely that his total was at least 40 enemy aircraft destroyed, a figure which biographer Edgar Baker has compiled through a list of semi-official records and log-books. Baker asserts that the true figure could be higher, owing to the inability of post-war researchers to identify an exact figure, due to the loss or destruction of British records in the retreat from Greece or during the subsequent occupation. Recent research into Pattle's claims has shown that 23 claims can be directly linked to records by March 1941. The Air Historical Branch contains information collated through memory. Baker's work suggests another 17 were claimed in April 1941. Other research dedicated to the history of German bomber units, some of which took part in the air battles against Pattle's unit, have drawn attention to the fact that 97–98 percent of all German primary records belonging to the Luftwaffe have been lost either through Allied bombing or through Hermann Göring's order to destroy all records in the first week of May 1945. This makes any research into German bomber losses difficult.

Chronicle of aerial victories
Claim No.	Date	Flying	Kills	Notes
1–2.	4 August 1940	Gladiator	1 x Breda Ba 65, 1 x Fiat CR.42	Against six Ba 65s of 159^{a} Squadriglia, 50° Stormo and six CR.42s and CR.32s of 160^{a} Squadriglia, 50° Stormo. The Italians suffered four damaged Ba.65s while 80 Squadron as a whole claimed two Ba.65s, one CR.32 and one CR.42.
3–4.	8 August 1940	Gladiator	2 x Fiat CR.42	9° and 10° Gruppo lost 4 CR.42s and another four fighters damaged or force-landed. 80 Squadron claimed nine and six probably destroyed.
	15 September 1940	Gladiator	1 x SM.79 damaged	
5–6.	19 November 1940	Gladiator	2 x Fiat CR.42s	Versus CR.42s of 160° Gruppo and G.50bis of 24° Gruppo, who lost three CR.42s and a G.50bis. 80 Squadron claimed nine destroyed and two probable. Sergente Tenente Maggiore Viola was killed and possibly fell in battle with Pattle.
	27 November 1940	Gladiator	Two SM.79s (or CR.42s) shared	Claimed with 11 other pilots.
	29 November 1940	Gladiator	2 shared SM.79s damaged	Both Z.1007bis of 47° Stormo (with William Vale).
7–8.	2 December 1940	Gladiator	2 x Ro 37s	72° Gruppo lost three;. Sergente Luigi Del Mancino and observer Tenente Michele Milano, Capitano Gardella & Capitano Fuchs and Sergente Leoni & Sergente Vescia were all killed.
9–11.	4 December 1940	Gladiator	3 x Fiat CR.42; 2 x Fiat CR.42 probable 1 x CR.42 damaged	150° Gruppo lost two, Tenente Alberto Triolo and Sottotenente Paolo Penna killed, against RAF claims of seven downed.
12–13.	20 December 1940	Gladiator	1 x SM.79; 1 x SM.81	SM.79 of 253^{a} Squadriglia, 104° Gruppo BT shot down, Tenente Andrea Berlingieri and his crew killed, and a SM.81 of 38° Stormo was also lost. Pattle's victim was certainly Berlingieri.
14.	21 December 1940	Gladiator	1 x Fiat CR.42; 1 x BR.20 probable	80 Squadron claimed eight destroyed. 160° Gruppo claimed to have lost two aircraft and one force-landed. A BR.20 of 47° Stormo was damaged.
	28 January 1941	Gladiator	Third share x Cant Z.1007 destroyed half share x BR.20 probable	80 Squadron claimed two destroyed, one probable and one damaged.
15.	9 February 1941	Gladiator	1 x Fiat CR.42	versus 16 CR.42s of 150 Gruppo. 364^{a} Squadriglia lost two aircraft and two crash-landed. 80 Squadron. claimed four destroyed, three probables for one loss.
	10 February 1941	Gladiator	1 x Z.1007 damaged 1 x BR.20 damaged	
16.	20 February 1941	Hurricane	1 x Fiat G.50 Freccia	Engaged eight of 154° Autonomo Gruppo; who lost two Fiat G.50s- Tenente Alfredo Fusco of 361^{a} Squadriglia killed (probably Pattle's victim) and Tenente Livio Bassi (a 7–claim ace) of 395^{a} Squadriglia and one G.50 damaged.
17.	27 February 1941	Hurricane	1 x Fiat CR.42	Engaged 13 CR 42s of 150° Gruppo. 150° Gruppo lost two 80 and 33 Squadrons claimed seven Fiats shot down.
18–21.	28 February 1941	Hurricane	2 x Fiat CR.42; 2 x Fiat BR.20; 1 x Fiat CR.42 probable	37° Stormo lost three BR.20s (and one force landed) against RAF claims of five. 160° Gruppo lost two CR.42 against RAF claims of 13. RAF claimed 27 in total.
22–24.	4 March 1941	Hurricane	3 x Fiat G.50s; 1 x Fiat CR.42 probable.	Against the G.50bis and CR.42s of 24° Gruppo. RAF claimed seven G.50bis destroyed, four probables and four damaged, three CR.42s and one probable, losing two Hurricanes and two pilots killed. No G.50bis losses have been recorded, while 24° Gruppo CT. lost two CR.42s and one damaged.
25.	23 March 1941	Hurricane	1 x Fiat G 50; 1 x Fiat G.50 probable 3 x Fiat G.50s on ground.	33 Squadron claimed three G.50bis shot down, one probable and two damaged. Italian records can't verify these air claims. Italian records have one Fiat G.50bis was destroyed (caught fire) on the ground.
26–27.	6 April 1941	Hurricane	2 x Bf 109s.	Versus eight Bf 109Es of 8./Jagdgeschwader 27 (JG 27— "Fighter wing 27"). 33 Squadron claimed five without loss, 8./JG 27 lost four aircraft and a fifth crash-landed. Staffelkapitän Oberleutnant Arno Becker (Black 2) killed, Leutnant Klaus Faber baled out and captured (both by Pattle) and Oberfeldwebel. Gerhard Frömming (Black 8) shot down and wounded. One other Bf 109 was lost, the unnamed pilot baling out and returning to Axis lines. Following armistice and surrender of Yugoslavia, both Faber and Frömming were repatriated in late April 1941.
28–29.	7 April 1941	Hurricane	1 x Dornier Do 17; 1 x CR 42	Possibly Do 17 of Stab./Sturzkampfgeschwader 2, reported attacked & 15% damaged.
30.	9 April 1941	Hurricane	1 x Dornier Do 17	Initially claimed as a Ju 88 damaged, it was a Do 17Z of 9./Kampfgeschwader 2 flown by Unteroffizier Ulrich Sonnemann. Pattle inspected the wreckage.
31–32.	10 April 1941	Hurricane	1 x Bf 110; 1 x Bf 109.	Two Bf 110s of 7./Lehrgeschwader 2 (("Learning Wing 2")) were lost during the day, as was a Bf 109E of Stab./JG 27(Oberleunant Mardaas killed), but all apparently recorded as accidents.
33–34.	11 April 1941	Hurricane	1 x Junkers Ju 88; 1 x Heinkel He 111	Both were single low-flying Ju 88s of III/Kampfgeschwader 30 (KG 30); 4D+JR of 7 staffel(Oberleutnant Hans Schaible and crew killed) and 4D+FS of 8./KG 30 (Leutnant ? Wimmer and crew killed).
35–36.	12 April 1941	Hurricane	1 x Dornier Do 17; 1 x S-79; 1 x Bf 109 damaged	VIII. Fliegerkorps (8th air corps) reported a loss of a Ju 88—possibly of I./Lehrgeschwader 1. Two SM.79s were claimed two destroyed. The Bf 109 Pattle claimed was part of their escort.
37–40.	14 April 1941	Hurricane	1 x Junkers Ju 88; 1 x SM.79; 1 x Bf 109; 1 x Bf 110	German records show/claim the sole Bf 109 loss was Hauptmann Hans-Joachim Gerlach of 6./JG 27, taken POW when his aircraft was hit during a strafing attack. One Ju 88 claimed, probably of II/Kampfgeschwader 51 (KG 51—Bomber Wing 51), which lost two (one crew baled out, other crashed at base) or could be L1+UH of I./LG piloted by Leutnant Gert Blanke.
41–46.	19 April 1941	Hurricane	3 x Junkers Ju 88; 1 x Junkers Ju 88 probable third share Hs 126; 1 x SM.79; 2 x Bf 109.	One of the Ju 88 claims can be corroborated. Pattle shot down Gruppenkommandeur (group commander) Hauptmann Heinrich Hahn of I./KG 51. A Henschel Hs 126 6K+AH of l.(H)/23; Feldwebel H. Wilhus and observer killed. 33 Squadron claimed four Bf 109s for one Hurricane shot down and two badly damaged. III./JG 77 losing three Bf 109Es. Oberleutnant Armin Schmidt of 9./JG 77 was killed. Oberleutnant Kurt Ubben of 8./JG 77 force-landed in Allied lines and was picked up, while Oberleutnant Werner Patz crash-landed at Larissa. Stabsarzt Dr Stormer landed in a Fieseler Fi 156 to rescue them.
47–50.	20 April 1941	Hurricane	1 x Junkers Ju 88; 2 x Bf 109; 1 x Bf 110	Both Bf 109Es of III./JG 77; Unteroffzier Fritz Borchert was reported missing and one other Bf 109 crash-landed at Larissa badly damaged. 15 Hurricanes of 33 and 80 Squadrons. intercepted Ju 88s and entered combat against the Bf 110 escort of 5./ZG 26. Two Bf 110s were lost—3U+EN (Oberleutnant Kurt Specka) and 3U+FN (Feldwebel Georg Leinfelder), and a third crash-landed severely damaged and written off. The RAF claimed seven Bf 110s in total.

== Memorials ==
Pattle is commemorated on the Alamein Memorial at El Alamein together with 3,000 other Commonwealth airmen who lost their lives in the Middle Eastern Theatre during the Second World War, and who have no known grave.

Air Marshal Sir Peter Wykeham, recalled: "Pat Pattle was a natural. Some fighter pilots did not last long because they were too kind to their aircraft; others were successful because they caned it half to death. And their victories were accompanied by burst engines, popping rivets, stretched wire, wrinkled wings. But Pat was a sensitive pilot, who considered his machine, but, somehow he got more from it than anyone else, and possibly more than it had to give."

Pattle is mentioned in Roald Dahl's second autobiography, Going Solo. He flew with Pattle in Greece and called him "the Second World War's greatest flying ace."

The novel Signed with their Honour (1942), by war correspondent James Aldridge, is a fictionalized but realistic account of 80 Squadron's activities in Greece. It is dedicated to Pattle and 80 Squadron's CO, Hickey, who was also killed in action in Greece.
