= William Woods (RAF officer) =

Irish pilot in the Royal Air Force

Timber Woods

William Joseph "Timber" Woods, DFC (1913 – 20 April 1941) was an Irish pilot in the Royal Air Force, who became a fighter ace during the Second World War. Flying the Gloster Gladiator, a biplane, and later the Hawker Hurricane, he was credited with 6 confirmed and 1 probable aerial victory. Having served in a flight based in Malta, he joined No. 80 Squadron RAF in January 1941. He was shot down and killed during the Battle of Athens.
