= Grendon and Doddershall Woods =

Protected area in Buckinghamshire, England

Coordinates: 51.881835°N 0.985168°W

- Site of Special Scientific Interest
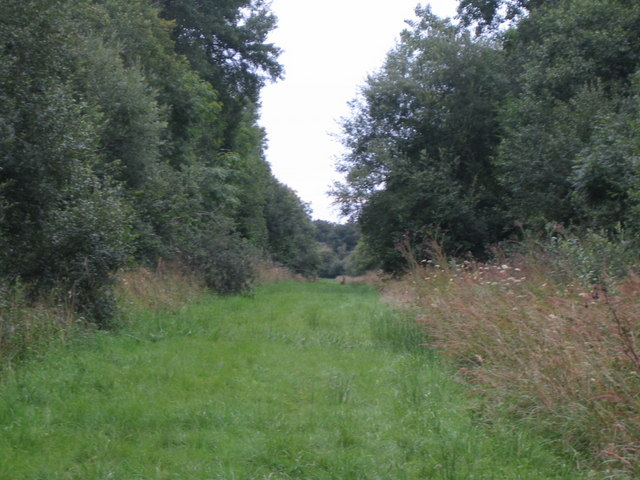
- Path in Doddershall Wood
- Location of Grendon and Doddershall Woods.
- Area of search: Buckinghamshire
- Grid reference: SP710210
- Interest: Biological
- Area: 67.1 ha (166 acres)
- Notification date: 1984
- Location map: Magic Map

Grendon and Doddershall Woods are a 67.1-hectare (166-acre) biological Site of Special Scientific Interest in Grendon Underwood in Buckinghamshire. The local planning authorities are Aylesbury Vale District Council and Buckinghamshire County Council.

The site is broadleaved oak woodland on north Buckinghamshire clay, with an understorey of hazel and blackthorn. Herbs include primrose and wood anemone, and small streams and wide rides provide additional habitats. The woods have 35 butterfly species, including the rare black hairstreak. There were five species of fritillary, but some have not been seen since the late 1970s. Breeding birds include nightingales.

There is access by footpaths from Grendon Underwood.
