= HM Prison Grendon =

Prison in Buckinghamshire, England

Coordinates: 51.8931°N 1.0059°W

HMP Grendon
- Interactive map of HMP Grendon
- Location: Grendon Underwood, Buckinghamshire
- Security class: Adult Male/Category B
- Capacity: 238
- Population: 212 (August 2013)
- Opened: 1962
- Managed by: HM Prison Services
- Governor: Olivia Phelps
- Website: Grendon at justice.gov.uk

HM Prison Grendon is a Category B men's prison, located near the village of Grendon Underwood, in Buckinghamshire, England. The prison is operated by His Majesty's Prison Service, and is jointly managed with HMP Spring Hill which is situated next to Grendon.

== History ==
Opened in 1962, Grendon was initially used as an experimental psychiatric prison and psychiatric unit for prisoners with antisocial personality disorders. It developed into a therapeutic community (TC) prison based upon principles established at the Henderson Hospital in London. There are five, sometimes six discrete therapeutic communities, each with over 40 resident prisoners. In 2014, a small TC opened for prisoners with learning disabilities who had previously been excluded from treatment. This 'TC+' was modelled on similar projects begun the previous year at Dovegate and Gartree Prisons.

Grendon has been one of the most researched forensic establishments in the world and has established standards for good relationships between staff and residents, and low levels of violence and self-harm. Research studies have shown lower levels of reoffending for men who stay longer than eighteen months.

Over the years, Grendon has slowly evolved into a mainstream prison with a standard regime. However the prison is the United Kingdom's only therapeutic prison community for the treatment of serious sex offenders and violent offenders. A prisoner escaped in 1992 while on a planned camping event. Three prisoners escaped from Grendon in October 2001. The three inmates (two of whom were serving life sentences for murder) were recaptured days later.

A prisoner at Grendon serving 18 years for robbery escaped in June 2003 while at the John Radcliffe Hospital for treatment.

In October 2006 another prisoner escaped whilst returning to Grendon. The inmate had been released on a temporary licence, and was being driven back to the prison by officers, when he jumped out of the moving car on to a motorway, and escaped.

== The prison today ==
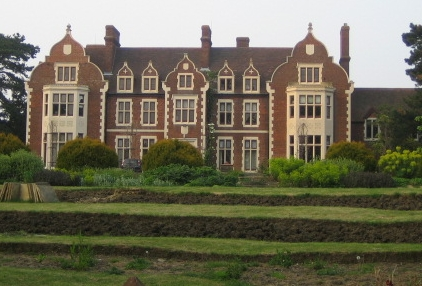

Grendon Prison holds category B & C adult male prisoners in England & Wales. Each of the six wings of the prison is a therapeutic community which operates autonomously. Based on therapeutic community principles, the therapeutic programmes of the prison include teams of doctors, psychiatric nurses, counsellors and prison officers who work with inmates individually and in groups to promote rehabilitation and tackle reoffending.

Democratic Therapeutic Communities provide group-based therapy within a social climate which promotes positive relationships, personal responsibility and social participation. Therapeutic Communities address a range of offender needs including interpersonal relationships, emotional regulation, self-management and psychological wellbeing.

HMP Grendon provides group therapy and structured community living where members are encouraged to have shared responsibility for day to day decision-making and problem solving. TC intervention centres on addressing the risk factors and offending behaviour needs that inevitably emerge in this environment.

=== Key features of TCs include ===
- daily group or community meetings
- the use of community activities to promote skill development and generalisation, e.g. work assignments, delegated responsibilities, organising events, involvement in prisoner/staff committees
- staff supporting the community in democratic decision-making and providing pro social role models
- staff and prisoners challenging and giving feedback about behaviour that is anti-social or linked to offending behaviour patterns.

=== Reception criteria ===
The basic referral criteria includes:

- Cat B or C
- Has more than 18 months to serve
- Has been off Category A or escape list for at least six months
- Meets “drug-free” criteria (no positive drug tests within two months of referral)
- Scoring 25 or above on the Hare Psychopathy Checklist
- Comprehension of rules/signs compact

There is clear evidence that the therapeutic community approach is effective. Research shows that the institutional behaviour of prisoners improves including reduced adjudications and acts of self-harm. Surveys of staff and prisoners also show that they both report higher quality of life than in comparable establishments. In addition, there is research evidence that they reduce the risk of reoffending for those who remain in treatment for at least 18 months.

Grendon Prison has a visits centre, which has been awarded a Charter Mark for its facilities. These include an inside children's playroom and an outside play area, a baby changing room, toilets, and a canteen.
