= HM Prison Spring Hill =

Prison in Buckinghamshire, England

Coordinates: 51.8924°N 1.0089°W

HMP Spring Hill
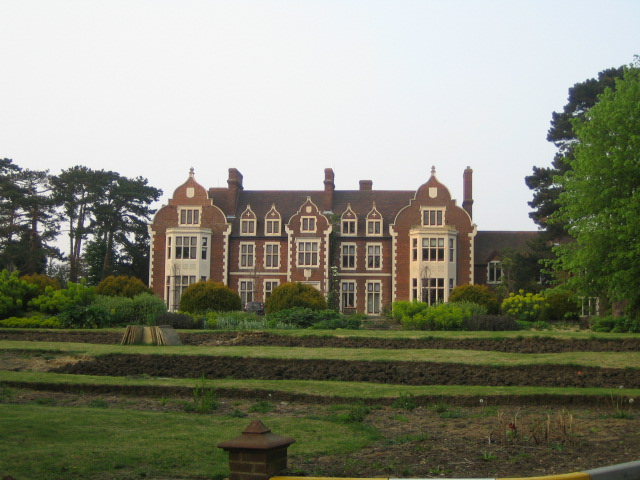
- Interactive map of HMP Spring Hill
- Location: Grendon Underwood, Buckinghamshire
- Security class: Adult Male/Category D
- Population: 334 (April 2005)
- Opened: 1953
- Managed by: HM Prison Services
- Governor: Olivia Phelps
- Website: Spring Hill at justice.gov.uk

HM Prison Spring Hill is a Category D men's prison, located in the village of Grendon Underwood, in Buckinghamshire, England. The prison is operated by His Majesty's Prison Service, and is jointly managed with HMP Grendon, which is situated next to Spring Hill.

== History ==
Originally known as Grendon Hall, the building was constructed in 1872 as a family home. During the Second World War the site was initially used as a base for MI6, and was then a training centre for the Special Operations Executive. After the war, the site was converted by the Prison Service, and became the first open prison in the United Kingdom in 1953.

In April 2003, burglars broke into Spring Hill Prison, stealing £650 from a safe and taking valuable personal effects, including mobile phones, from inmates' lockers.

In December 2007, after a colony of sparrows had settled at the London Zoo's Gorilla exhibit, inmates constructed ten bird boxes for the zoo to encourage the birds to breed and stay in the area.

== The prison today ==
Spring Hill is a Category D open resettlement prison for male adults. Most of the prisoners held at Spring Hill are long-term inmates, transferred from other prisons for the last few years of their sentence.

HMP Spring Hill offers a range of employment and education courses. There are also two vocational learning centres (in Information Technology and Bricklaying). The education department has links with local colleges, offering opportunities for prisoners to attend college outside the prison on a full or part-time basis.

In June 2018, HMP Spring Hill became the third prison in the world to host a Parkrun, a weekly 5-kilometre running event that takes place at over 1,400 locations in 22 countries.

== Notable former inmates ==
- Chris Atkins
