= Theodor Rossiwall =

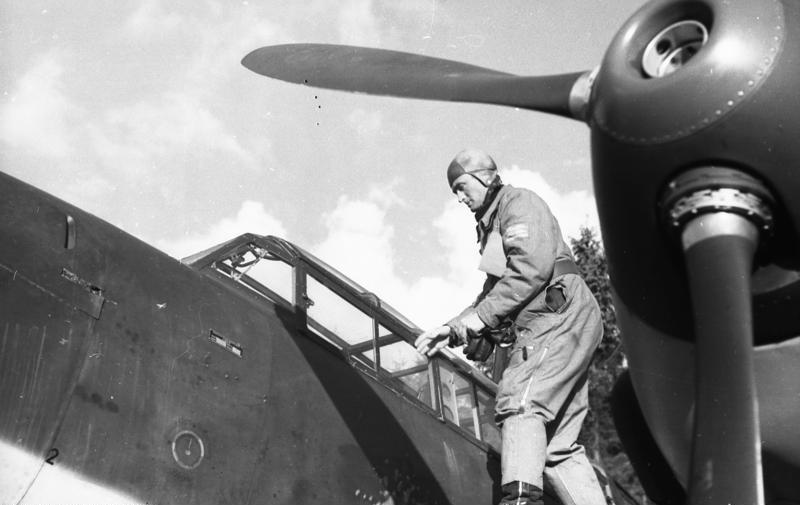
- Born: 12 October 1915; Vienna
- Died: 11 July 1979 (aged 63); Vienna
- Burial place: Zentralfriedhof, Vienna
- Military career
- Allegiance: Federal State of Austria (1938); Nazi Germany (1938 to 1945); Austria
- Branch: Luftwaffe; Austrian Air Force
- Highest Rank: Oberstleutnant (Luftwaffe); Oberst (Austrian Air Force)
- Commands: 5. II./ZG 26; II./NJG 4; I./NJG 101; ZG 76
- Wars: Spanish Civil War; World War II
- Awards: Ehrenpokal der Luftwaffe; Knight's Cross of the Iron Cross

Theodor Rossiwall (12 October 1915 – 11 July 1979) was a Luftwaffe fighter ace and recipient of the Knight's Cross of the Iron Cross during World War II. Rossiwall claimed 19 aircraft shot down in over 400 missions. Among these 19 aerial victories are 2 victories claimed in the Spanish Civil War. He is one of the two pilots credited with the kill of the Royal Air Force (RAF) top ace Pat Marmaduke Pattle, on 20 April 1941, with Sophus Baagoe.

== Early life ==
Theodor Rossiwall was born 12 October 1915, in Vienna. He joined the Austrian Air Force as a Leutnant around February 1938, and was transferred to the Luftwaffe around March, after the Anschluss, where he eventually ended up in Jagdgeschwader 134.

== Spanish Civil War ==
Rossiwall fought with the Condor Legion in the Spanish Civil War, where he shot down two Republican aircraft. He listed a "probable" on 30 October 1938. On 20 December 1938, he claimed a Polikarpov I-16 near Reus, while flying as part of 3. Staffel of Jagdgruppe 88. On 1 April 1939, he was promoted to Oberleutnant (first lieutenant). On 1 July 1939, Rossiwall was transferred to Zerstörergeschwader 26.

== World War II ==
Rossiwall is credited with shooting down a total of 17 enemy aircraft during World War II. After Eberhard von Trützschler-d'Elsa was shot down and taken prisoner on May 18, 1940, Rossiwall, who had been with 6. Staffel of Zerstörergeschwader 26 (6./ZG 26) operating out of an airfield in As, Belgium, was given command of d'Elsa's squadron, 5. Staffel, on May 19. However, the staffel was only left with three serviceable planes after the events of the day before. On 31 May 1940, the evacuation of Dunkirk was underway and Oberleutnant Rossiwall was Staffelkapitän of 5. Staffel, II. Gruppe of Zerstörergeschwader 26 (5. II/ZG 26). That day, he is said to have led a lone Schwarm in an ambush against a group of Spitfires ten times as large, sending them scattering with five shot down. In August 1940, Rossiwall's Staffel is said to have been "free hunting" with III/ZG 26, when it returned to France to claim 4 victories on August 18 without any losses. Rossiwall was then promoted to Hauptmann on January 1, 1942. On 22 June 1941, Rossiwall had been moved to the Eastern Front, where he would claim 7 more aerial victories. On 20 April 1941, Rossiwall commanded his Staffel as a Hauptmann which on that day shot down 5 Hurricanes, one attributed to Rossiwall himself. During this engagement, he and Sophus Baagoe shared in credit for shooting down British flying ace Pat Pattle over Crete, with both being credited with an individual kill that may have been Pattle. Rossiwall was awarded the Knight's Cross of the Iron Cross on 6 August 1941. From 10 January 1942 he commanded II. Gruppe of Nachtjagdgeschwader 4, where he achieved two night victories.

In November 1942, Rossiwall took command of a fighter group in Nachtjagdschule 1, a Luftwaffe pilot training school. While there, on 1 March 1943, he was promoted to Major. Then, later in March (Note: Given dates range from 19 March to after 23 March.) Nachtjagdschule 1 was reorgignized into Nachtjagdgeschwader 101, with Rossiwall commanding Gruppe I of the newly named wing first based out of Schleissheim, then out of Ingolstadt.

In August 1943, the inactive Zerstörergeschwader 76 (ZG 76) was newly formed and established as an anti-bomber unit under the command of the now Oberstleutnant Rossiwall. At the end of 1943, Rossiwall is still noted as commander of Stab/ZG 76, operating out of Ansbach with 3 Bf 110 aircraft specifically designated to his command unit. He shot down 3 B-17s with ZG 76. He was also wounded during a take-off accident with a Bf 110 G-2 on 24 January 1944. In 1945, Rossiwall attended a Nazi education course for the Luftwaffe.

== Later life ==
After the war, Rossiwall served in the Austrian Air Force and retired with the rank of Oberst.

Theodor Rossiwall died 10 July 1976. He is buried in Zentralfriedhof, in Vienna.

== Summary of career ==
=== Aerial victory claims ===
According to Obermaier, Rossiwall was credited with 19 aerial victories, two of which during the Spanish Civil War and 17 during World War II, including four on the Eastern Front, two at night, three heavy bombers and seven British fighter aircraft, claimed in over 400 combat missions. Mathews and Foreman, authors of Luftwaffe Aces — Biographies and Victory Claims, researched the German Federal Archives and also stated that he claimed 19 aerial victories although only seven are specifically listed.

Chronicle of aerial victories
| Claim | Date | Time | Type | Location | Claim | Date | Time | Type | Location |
Spanish Civil War
– 3. Staffel of Jagdgruppe 88 – Spanish Civil War — October – December 1938
| 1 | 31 October 1938 | — | I-16 | | 2 | 20 December 1938 | — | I-16 | |
World War II
– 5. Staffel of Zerstörrergeschwader 26 –
| 3 | 31 May 1940 | — | Spitfire | Dunkirk | — | 20 April 1940 | — | Hurricane | vicinity of Athens |
| 4 | 31 May 1940 | — | Spitfire | Dunkirk | 10 | 9 May 1941 | — | unknown | Greece |
– Stab of Zerstörrergeschwader 76 –
| — | 4 October 1943 | 11:48 | B-17 | | | | | | |

=== Awards ===
- Spanish Cross in Gold with Swords (14 April 1939)
- Honor Goblet of the Luftwaffe (28 September 1940)
- Iron Cross (1939) 2nd and 1st class
- Knight's Cross of the Iron Cross on 6 August 1941 as Hauptmann and Staffelkapitän of the 5./Zerstörergeschwader 26 "Horst Wessel"

== Notes ==
Military offices
| Preceded by Generalmajor Walter Grabmann | Commander of Zerstörergeschwader 76; August 1943 – 24 January 1944 | Succeeded by Oberstleutnant Robert Kowalewski |
