= Going Solo =

1986 autobiographical book by Roald Dahl

- First edition
- Author: Roald Dahl
- Language: English
- Genre: Autobiography
- Publisher: Jonathan Cape (UK)
- Publication date: 1986
- Publication place: United Kingdom
- Pages: 208
- ISBN: 9780224024075
- Followed by: Matilda (1988)

Going Solo is an autobiography by Roald Dahl, first published by Jonathan Cape in London in 1986. It is a continuation of his autobiography describing his childhood, Boy and detailed his travel to Africa and exploits as a World War II pilot.

== Plot summary ==
=== Before World War II ===
Dahl begins a voyage to Africa in 1938 for his new job working for the Shell Oil Company, prompted by his desire to find adventure after finishing school. He boards the SS Mantola and during his journey, meets various people, reflecting on the different cultures and dialects spoken by British expatriates. He arrives in Dar es Salaam, Tanganyika (modern-day Tanzania), forming a bond with the people by learning Swahili and developing a close relationship with his house servant, Mdisho. He describes extraordinary events such as his gardener, Salimu, killing a black mamba with a rake, a lion carrying a woman in its mouth, and the capture of a snake in a home.

=== During World War II ===
World War II breaks out, and Dahl receives an order from a British captain telling him to capture all German nationals as soon as war is declared, making him a temporary army officer. While leading Kenyan troops into the jungle to arrest all German nationals, a harsh confrontation emerges with a batch of German convoys, leading to the leader threatening to kill Dahl after thrusting a Luger pistol in his chest until he is shot and killed by a member of Dahl's troops.

After the incident, Dahl discovers that his Arabian sword is missing, and his anxiety grows until Mdisho returns holding the sword, dried with blood. He tells Dahl that he killed a notable German sisal planter via decapitation with the sword after being motivated by the war. Dahl refrains from his disproval and instead explains the gravity of the situation and the possible repercussions from the local authorities, to which Mdisho becomes devastated. To comfort Mdisho, Dahl tells him that he is being sent as a pilot to serve in the war, and gifts the sword to Mdisho to keep it. Mdisho, initially reluctant to accept the gift, accepts the gift and agrees to keep the details of his killing confidential.

In November 1939, Dahl joins the Royal Air Force and leaves the Shell Oil Company, making a solo trip from Dar es Salaam to Nairobi. He learns to fly the Tiger Moth, completing training after eight weeks after his first successful solo flight. He then goes for advanced training in Habbaniyah, Iraq, where he and his comrades are split into different squadrons.

==== Flight to 80 Squadron crash ====
On 19 September 1940, Dahl is given wrong orders to fly to Marsa Matrouh, where he would meet No. 80 Squadron's landing strip thirty miles south of Fouka, when in reality it was fifty miles south. As dusk approached, his Gloster Gladiator began running out of fuel, and, seeing no airstrip to land on, Dahl attempted to land on a seemingly smooth piece of ground; however, the Gladiator's undercarriage is stuck by a boulder and collapsed in the sand, breaking his skull, nose, and causing him to be temporarily blinded. He is sent to Alexandria, Egypt to undergo surgery and develops a liking for a nurse named Mary Welland, imagining her to be similar in appearance to Myrna Loy. After some time, he regains his vision and is discharged after five months of recovery in February 1941, where he spent four weeks in convalescence before reporting back to the RAF in Cairo. He then learns that No. 80 Squadron was now located in Greece, to which he flies with a Hawker Hurricane.

==== German invasion of Greece and the Battle of Athens ====
Dahl was among the last Allied pilots to withdraw from Greece during the German invasion, taking part in the air for the Battle of Athens on 20 April 1941. After the country fell to Nazi Germany, he went to the Middle East to fight Vichy French pilots after staying for a brief time in Alexandria, Egypt.

=== Post World War II ===
Dahl returns home to Grendon Underwood.

== Analysis ==
In Storyteller: The Authorized Biography of Roald Dahl (2010), Donald Sturrock claimed that there are disparities to the author's claims in the book, describing them as flights of pure fancy or compelling recreations of stories heard from others such as the accounts about exotic African animal adventures. There was also the case of his encounter with a group of Germans, whom he had orders to round up. Dahl wrote in Going Solo that its leader was killed by an African guard after thrusting a Luger pistol in his chest. In Lucky Break (1977), a story published 10 years before, the version of this story was less dramatic with the Germans quickly giving themselves up, allowing Dahl's group to march themselves to a camp in Dar es Salaam without much difficulty.
