= Battle of Athens (1941) =

WW2 aerial conflict over Athens, Greece

The Battle of Athens (also known as the Battle of Piraeus Harbour) on 20 April 1941 is the name given by author Roald Dahl to a 30-minute Dogfight over Athens between the Royal Air Force and the Luftwaffe towards the end of the Battle of Greece.

Roald Dahl flew a Hawker Hurricane in the battle, which he described in his second autobiography Going Solo and in the short story 'Katina'.

Led by Squadron Leader Marmaduke "Pat" Pattle, the twelve remaining Hurricanes of the Royal Air Force (RAF)'s 80 Squadron (there had earlier been fourteen) were flying in formation over Athens to boost civilian morale. According to Dahl, the battle began when they were attacked by a large group of German Luftwaffe aircraft, mostly Messerschmitt Bf 109s and Bf 110s along with some Junkers Ju 87s and Junkers Ju 88s. According to the citizens of Athens the Germans had 200 planes; according to Dahl, they had 152 bombers and fighters.

In the resulting battle four RAF pilots were shot down and killed, including the famous Pattle and the Irish RAF pilot William "Timber" Woods, while one pilot lost his Hawker Hurricane but was able to escape. Dahl said Greek observers counted 22 German aircraft shot down, although another source states that the Germans lost eight aircraft. Dahl escaped from Greece with the remnants of his squadron. Dahl's close friend David Coke was credited with shooting down one Junkers.
