= Karl-Heinz Weber =

German World War II flying ace (1922–1944)

- Karl-Heinz Weber during World War II
- Born: 30 January 1922; Heringsdorf, Germany
- Died: 7 June 1944 (aged 22) south of Rouen, France
- Cause of death: Killed in action
- Military career
- Allegiance: Nazi Germany
- Branch: Luftwaffe
- Service years: 1939–1944
- Rank: Hauptmann (captain)
- Nickname: Benjamin
- Units: JG 51, JG 1
- Commands: III./JG 1
- Conflicts: World War II
- Awards: Knight's Cross of the Iron Cross with Oak Leaves

Karl-Heinz Weber (30 January 1922 – 7 June 1944) was a Luftwaffe flying ace of World War II. He was also a recipient of the Knight's Cross of the Iron Cross with Oak Leaves, the highest award in the military and paramilitary forces of Nazi Germany during World War II. Weber was credited with 136 aerial victories—that is, 136 aerial combat encounters resulting in the destruction of the enemy aircraft. All his victories were claimed over the Eastern Front in over 500 combat missions.

== Career ==
Weber, the son of a Reichsbahn-Sekretär, was born on 30 January 1922 in Heringsdorf in the province of Pomerania, a Free State of Prussia. A pre-war glider pilot, he volunteered for military service in the Luftwaffe in late 1939. Leutnant Weber was posted to 7. Staffel (7th squadron) of Jagdgeschwader 51 (JG 51—51st Fighter Wing) on 1 October 1940. (Note: For an explanation of Luftwaffe unit designations see Organisation of the Luftwaffe during World War II.)

=== On the Eastern Front ===
In June 1941, JG 51 and the majority of the Luftwaffe were transferred to the Eastern Front in preparation for Operation Barbarossa, the invasion of the Soviet Union. There, Weber claimed his first aerial victory on 24 June 1941 over a Tupolev SB-2 bomber. On 6 July, for his achievements to date he was awarded the Iron Cross 2nd Class (Eisernes Kreuz zweiter Klasse).

During the Battle of Rzhev on 3 September 1942, Weber claimed a Petlyakov Pe-2 twin-engined dive bomber shot down in combat southwest of Sychyovka. Later that day, the airfield at Dugino came under Soviet bomber attack, during its defense, he was shot down and wounded in his Messerschmitt Bf 109 F-2 (Werknummer 8240—factory number) northwest of Dugino. While Weber was recovering from his injuries, III. Gruppe (3rd group) was relocated to Jesau, near Königsberg in East Prussia for conversion to the Focke-Wulf Fw 190 A-2 and A-3. On 19 November 1942, Soviet forces launched the Velikiye Luki offensive operation. During this operation, Weber claimed a Mikoyan-Gurevich MiG-3 fighter east-southeast of Zubtsov on 15 January 1943. Operating from the airfield at Oryol-West, equipped with heated hangars and buildings, III. Gruppe was tasked with operating in the airspace south and east of Oryol. On 23 February, in the area north of Oryol and east of Zhizdra, Weber claimed a Lavochkin-Gorbunov-Gudkov LaGG-3 fighter and an Ilyushin Il-2 ground-attack aircraft shot down. The following day, in combat northeast of Zhizdra, Weber claimed two Petlyakov Pe-2 bombers shot down. On 16 March, he was awarded the German Cross in Gold (Deutsches Kreuz in Gold).

=== Squadron leader ===
On 5 June 1943, Weber temporarily was given command of 7. Staffel, replacing Hauptmann Herbert Wehnelt who had fallen ill. On 5 July, III. Gruppe began flying missions in support of Operation Citadel, as part of the Battle of Kursk. The Gruppe supported the 9th Army, attacking the salient from the north. That day, Weber became an "ace-in-a-day" for the first time. On an early morning mission east of Maloarkhangelsk he claimed a MiG-3 fighter shot down. In the early afternoon, on mission to the combat area near Ponyri, his flight intercepted a formation of Douglas A-20 Havoc, also known as Boston, escorted by Lavochkin La-5 fighters. In this encounter, Weber claimed a Boston and a La-5 shot down. On an early evening mission to Maloarkhangelsk, the Gruppe encountered Il-2 ground-attack aircraft escorted by fighter aircraft. In this engagement, Weber claimed a Yakovlev Yak-1 fighter and a La-5 fighter shot down. On 12 July, Weber and his wingman Unteroffizier Heinrich Dittlmann shot down Mladshiy Leytenant Nikolay Zhukov and Leytenant Nikolay Safonov from 32 GvIAP (Guards Fighter Aviation Regiment—Gvardeyskiy Istrebitelny Aviatsionny Polk).

On 13 August, Weber was then officially appointed Staffelkapitän (squadron leader) of the Staffel. The day before, he had been credited with his 100th aerial victory. He was the 49th Luftwaffe pilot to achieve the century mark.

On 1 April 1944, 7. Staffel relocated to an airfield at Terespol. On the first mission from this airfield, the Staffel escorted Heinkel He 111 bombers on a mission to Kovel. Northwest of Kovel, the Staffel intercepted 15 Il-2 ground-attack aircraft. In the aerial encounter, 7. Staffel pilots without loss of their own claimed eight Il-2s shot down, including two by Weber. In April 1944, III. Gruppe began re-equipping with the Bf 109 G-6 with 7. Staffel making the transition in early May at an airfield at Dęblin–Irena. On 28 May, III. Gruppe of JG 51 received orders to transfer one Staffel to the west in Defence of the Reich. The Gruppenkommandeur (group commander) Hauptmann Diethelm von Eichel-Streiber selected Weber's 7. Staffel which was then subordinated to the II. Gruppe of Jagdgeschwader 1 (JG 1—1st Fighter Wing).

=== Group commander and missing in action ===
III./JG 1 emblem

Following the transfer west, Weber was appointed Gruppenkommandeur of III. Gruppe of JG 1 on 3 June, succeeding Major Hartmann Grasser in this capacity. Only four days later, on 7 June, Weber led III. Gruppe of JG 1 from Beauvais–Tillé against Allied fighters south of Rouen on his first mission over the Invasion Front. He was reported as missing in action. It is assumed that he was shot down and killed in his Bf 109 G-6/AS (Werknummer 410 399) by P-51 Mustang fighters from No. 315 Polish Fighter Squadron.

Following Weber's death, command of III. Gruppe was temporarily given to Haupmann Alfred Grislawski who had led 8. Staffel of JG 1. Weber's body was never recovered. He was posthumously awarded the Knight's Cross of the Iron Cross with Oak Leaves (Ritterkreuz des Eisernen Kreuzes mit Eichenlaub). He was the 529th member of the German armed forces to be so honored. On 14 November 1952, Weber was declared dead as of 31 December 1945 by the Amtsgericht, an official court, in Stade.

== Summary of career ==
=== Aerial victory claims ===
According to US historian David T. Zabecki, Weber was credited with 136 aerial victories. Prien, Rodeike, Obermaier and Spick also list Weber with 136 aerial victories claimed in over 500 combat missions, and a mission-to-claim ratio of 3.68. Mathews and Foreman, authors of Luftwaffe Aces — Biographies and Victory Claims, researched the German Federal Archives and found records for 132 aerial victory claims, plus one further unconfirmed claim. All of his aerial victories were claimed on the Eastern Front.

Victory claims were logged to a map-reference (PQ = Planquadrat), for example "PQ 57744". The Luftwaffe grid map (Jägermeldenetz) covered all of Europe, western Russia and North Africa and was composed of rectangles measuring 15 minutes of latitude by 30 minutes of longitude, an area of about 360 square miles (930 km^{2}). These sectors were then subdivided into 36 smaller units to give a location area 3 km × 4 km (1.9 mi × 2.5 mi) in size.

Chronicle of aerial victories
This and the ♠ (Ace of spades) indicates those aerial victories which made Weber an "ace-in-a-day", a term which designates a fighter pilot who has shot down five or more airplanes in a single day. This and the ? (question mark) indicates information discrepancies listed by Prien, Stemmer, Rodeike, Balke, Bock, Mathews and Foreman.
Claim	Date	Time	Type	Location	Unit	Claim	Date	Time	Type	Location	Unit
– Claims with III. Gruppe of Jagdgeschwader 51 on the Eastern Front – Operation Barbarossa — 22 June – 5 December 1941
1	24 June 1941	19:05	SB-2		7./JG 51	7	8 August 1941	15:25	DB-3		Stab III./JG 51
2	30 June 1941	—	SB-2		7./JG 51	8	18 August 1941	08:35	DB-3		Stab III./JG 51
3	1 July 1941	—	V-11 (Il-2)		7./JG 51	9? (Note: According to Mathews and Foreman this claim is unconfirmed.)	18 August 1941	—	DB-3		Stab III./JG 51
4	12 July 1941	—	DB-3		7./JG 51	10	8 October 1941	14:00	SB-3		Stab III./JG 51
5	23 July 1941	18:57	SB-2	northeast of Babruysk	7./JG 51	11	24 October 1941	11:18	DB-3		Stab III./JG 51
6	28 July 1941	—	Pe-2		7./JG 51	12	25 October 1941	09:33	DB-3		7./JG 51
– Claims with III. Gruppe of Jagdgeschwader 51 "Mölders" on the Eastern Front – Winter War — 5 December 1941 – 30 April 1942
13? (Note: This claim is not listed by Mathews and Foreman.)	18 February 1942	—	unknown		7./JG 51	14?	8 March 1942	—	unknown		7./JG 51
– Claims with III. Gruppe of Jagdgeschwader 51 "Mölders" on the Eastern Front – 1 May 1942 – 3 February 1943
15?	1 July 1942	—	unknown		7./JG 51	24	2 September 1942	12:09	LaGG-3	east of Sychyovka	7./JG 51
16	5 July 1942	05:03	Il-2		7./JG 51	25	3 September 1942	14:20	Pe-2	southwest of Sychyovka	7./JG 51
17	5 July 1942	05:09? (Note: According to Mathews and Foreman claimed at 05:08.)	Pe-2		7./JG 51	26	15 January 1943	13:42	MiG-3	PQ 57744; 25 km (16 mi) east-southeast of Zubtsov	7./JG 51
18	10 July 1942	10:18	MiG-1		7./JG 51	27	29 January 1943	08:30	Pe-2	PQ 63194, southeast of Oryol; 10 km (6.2 mi) east of Zmiyovka	7./JG 51
19	2 August 1942	16:50	Il-2	PQ 57711; 25 km (16 mi) east of Zubtsov	7./JG 51	28	29 January 1943	08:31	Pe-2	PQ 63322, southeast of Oryol; 10 km (6.2 mi) east of Glazunovka	7./JG 51
20	6 August 1942	18:17	Il-2	PQ 56112; 40 km (25 mi) north-northeast of Gagarin	7./JG 51	29	3 February 1943	08:16	Il-2	PQ 73524; 20 km (12 mi) west of Livny	7./JG 51
21	8 August 1942	12:50	MiG-3	PQ 47843; 10 km (6.2 mi) south of Zubtsov	7./JG 51	30	3 February 1943	12:08	Il-2	PQ 73714; 40 km (25 mi) east of Zolotukhino	7./JG 51
22	9 August 1942	05:15	LaGG-3	PQ 47792; 20 km (12 mi) south-southwest of Zubtsov	7./JG 51	31	3 February 1943	12:15	Il-2	PQ 73823; 25 km (16 mi) south-southeast of Livny	7./JG 51
23	24 August 1942	07:43	Il-2	PQ 47573; 20 km (12 mi) west of Rzhev	7./JG 51						
– Claims with III. Gruppe of Jagdgeschwader 51 "Mölders" on the Eastern Front – 4 February – 31 December 1943
32	23 February 1943	12:28? (Note: According to Mathews and Foreman claimed at 12:26.)	LaGG-3	PQ 35 Ost 54173, 20 km (12 mi) east of Zhizdra; 20 km (12 mi) northwest of Zhizdra	7./JG 51	73	30 July 1943	11:51	Il-2 m.H. (Note: The "m.H." refers to an Ilyushin Il-2 with rear gunner (mit Heckschütze).)	PQ 35 Ost 64587; 10 km (6.2 mi) south of Telchje	7./JG 51
33	23 February 1943	12:33	Il-2	PQ 35 Ost 44242; 20 km (12 mi) east-northeast of Zhizdra	7./JG 51	74	1 August 1943	09:31	LaGG-3	PQ 35 Ost 54736; 10 km (6.2 mi) southwest of Kromy	7./JG 51
34	24 February 1943	10:50	Pe-2	PQ 35 Ost 44221; 25 km (16 mi) north of Zhizdra	7./JG 51	75	1 August 1943	17:50? (Note: According to Mathews and Foreman claimed at 17:56.)	La-5	PQ 35 Ost 53369 vicinity of Znamenskoye	7./JG 51
35	24 February 1943	10:53	Pe-2	PQ 35 Ost 45882; 25 km (16 mi) east-southeast of Kirov	7./JG 51	76	1 August 1943	18:02	LaGG-3	PQ 35 Ost 53455; 15 km (9.3 mi) south of Sockowo	7./JG 51
36	17 March 1943	11:55	LaGG-3? (Note: According to Mathews and Foreman claimed as a Lavochkin La-5.)	PQ 35 Ost 53643; 25 km (16 mi) west-southwest of Trosna	7./JG 51	77	2 August 1943	08:54	Il-2 m.H.	PQ 35 Ost 53451; 10 km (6.2 mi) southwest of Kromy	7./JG 51
37?	18 March 1943	09:15	MiG-3		7./JG 51	78	2 August 1943	13:12	LaGG-3	PQ 35 Ost 53614; 25 km (16 mi) west of Trosna	7./JG 51
38	7 May 1943	04:27	Il-2 m.H.	PQ 35 Ost 44312; 20 km (12 mi) south-southeast of Seschtschinskaja	7./JG 51	79	3 August 1943	06:17	Pe-2	PQ 35 Ost 53551; 15 km (9.3 mi) south-southeast of Dmitrovsk-Orlovsky	7./JG 51
39	11 May 1943	12:38? (Note: According to Mathews and Foreman claimed at 12:35.)	MiG-1	PQ 35 Ost 63443; 20 km (12 mi) north of Maloarkhangelsk	7./JG 51	80	3 August 1943	12:03	Il-2 m.H.	PQ 35 Ost 53616; 25 km (16 mi) west of Trosna	7./JG 51
40	12 May 1943	12:11	LaGG-3	PQ 35 Ost 73534; 15 km (9.3 mi) west of Livny	7./JG 51	81♠	4 August 1943	05:51	La-5	PQ 35 Ost 53527; 5 km (3.1 mi) west of Kromy	7./JG 51
41	14 May 1943	19:10	LaGG-3	PQ 35 Ost 63372; 25 km (16 mi) southwest of Glazunowka	7./JG 51	82♠	4 August 1943	10:08	La-5	PQ 35 Ost 53429; 20 km (12 mi) east of Znamenskoye	7./JG 51
42	2 June 1943	10:53	LaGG-3	PQ 35 Ost 63564; 10 km (6.2 mi) southwest of Maloarkhangelsk	7./JG 51	83♠	4 August 1943	10:41	LaGG-3	PQ 35 Ost 54824; 10 km (6.2 mi) east of Naryshkino	7./JG 51
43	8 June 1943	19:15	La-5	PQ 35 Ost 63113 vicinity of Oryol	7./JG 51	84♠	4 August 1943	13:21	Yak-7	PQ 35 Ost 53421; 5 km (3.1 mi) west of Kromy	7./JG 51
44	8 June 1943	19:18	Il-2 m.H.	PQ 35 Ost 64844; 20 km (12 mi) south of Mtsensk	7./JG 51	85♠	4 August 1943	13:37	Curtuss P-40	PQ 35 Ost 53223; 5 km (3.1 mi) southeast of Dmitrovsk-Orlovsky	7./JG 51
45♠	5 July 1943	04:03	MiG-3	PQ 35 Ost 63621; 25 km (16 mi) east-southeast of Maloarkhangelsk	7./JG 51	86	6 August 1943	12:51	LaGG-3	PQ 35 Ost 54723; 20 km (12 mi) southeast of Dudorovskiy	7./JG 51
46♠	5 July 1943	13:29	La-5	PQ 35 Ost 63644, 37 km (23 mi) southeast Oryol; 10 km (6.2 mi) southwest of Maloarkhangelsk	7./JG 51	87	6 August 1943	15:18	LaGG-3	PQ 35 Ost 54569; 10 km (6.2 mi) west of Znamenskoye	7./JG 51
47♠	5 July 1943	13:52	Boston	PQ 35 Ost 63593; 10 km (6.2 mi) southwest of Maloarkhangelsk	7./JG 51	88	7 August 1943	06:11	Boston	PQ 35 Ost 53561; 20 km (12 mi) southeast of Dmitrovsk-Orlovsky	7./JG 51
48♠	5 July 1943	18:11	Yak-1	PQ 35 Ost 63563; 5 km (3.1 mi) southeast of Maloarkhangelsk	7./JG 51	89	8 August 1943	16:05	LaGG-3	PQ 35 Ost 35453; 30 km (19 mi) northwest of Spas-Demensk	7./JG 51
49♠	5 July 1943	18:33	La-5	PQ 35 Ost 63562; 15 km (9.3 mi) east-northeast of Maloarkhangelsk	7./JG 51	90	9 August 1943	08:48	Yak-9	PQ 35 Ost 35633; 10 km (6.2 mi) northwest of Spas-Demensk	7./JG 51
50	6 July 1943	04:21	LaGG-3	PQ 35 Ost 63724; 25 km (16 mi) east-southeast of Maloarkhangelsk	7./JG 51	91	9 August 1943	12:31	LaGG-3	PQ 35 Ost 35404; 25 km (16 mi) north-northwest of Spas-Demensk	7./JG 51
51	6 July 1943	04:35	Il-2 m.H.	PQ 35 Ost 63544; 20 km (12 mi) west of Zolotukhino	7./JG 51	92	9 August 1943	16:08	Il-2 m.H.	PQ 35 Ost 35633; 25 km (16 mi) east-northeast of Yelnya	7./JG 51
52	6 July 1943	09:18	Il-2 m.H.	PQ 35 Ost 63693; 10 km (6.2 mi) south-southeast of Trosna	7./JG 51	93	9 August 1943	16:23	Il-2 m.H.	PQ 35 Ost 35446; 10 km (6.2 mi) northwest of Spas-Demensk	7./JG 51
53	6 July 1943	13:21	La-5? (Note: According to Mathews and Foreman claimed as a Lavochkin-Gorbunov-Gudkov LaGG-3.)	PQ 35 Ost 63754; 20 km (12 mi) west-southwest of Zolotukhino	7./JG 51	94	10 August 1943	15:01	Il-2 m.H.	PQ 35 Ost 45543 vicinity of Spas-Demensk	7./JG 51
54	7 July 1943	15:07? (Note: According to Mathews and Foreman claimed at 15:04.)	MiG-3	PQ 35 Ost 63743; 10 km (6.2 mi) southeast of Fatez	7./JG 51	95	11 August 1943	15:32	Il-2 m.H.	south-southeast of Yelnya south-southeast of Yelnya	7./JG 51
55	8 July 1943	12:22	MiG-3	PQ 35 Ost 63814; 10 km (6.2 mi) west of Zolotukhino	7./JG 51	96	11 August 1943	16:22	Il-2 m.H.	east of Yelnya	7./JG 51
56	8 July 1943	17:30	La-5	PQ 35 Ost 53832; 5 km (3.1 mi) east of Zolotukhino	7./JG 51	97	12 August 1943	17:24	Pe-2	southwest of Szaskino	7./JG 51
57	10 July 1943	13:05	MiG-1	PQ 35 Ost 63582; 20 km (12 mi) southwest of Maloarkhangelsk	7./JG 51	98	12 August 1943	17:32	La-5	north of Wesselucha	7./JG 51
58	11 July 1943	18:04	LaGG-3	PQ 35 Ost 63533 vicinity of Maloarkhangelsk	7./JG 51	99	12 August 1943	17:37	La-5	south of Kamenka	7./JG 51
59	12 July 1943	05:16	DB-3	PQ 35 Ost 73143; 20 km (12 mi) south-southeast of Belyov	7./JG 51	100	12 August 1943	17:40	La-5	south of Kamenka	7./JG 51
60	12 July 1943	09:03	La-5	PQ 35 Ost 63232; 10 km (6.2 mi) west of Verkhovye	7./JG 51	101	10 October 1943	09:48	Yak-9	PQ 35 Ost 06155, southeast of Nevel	7./JG 51
61	12 July 1943	14:00? (Note: According to Mathews and Foreman claimed at 19:00.)	Yak-7	PQ 35 Ost 64353; 20 km (12 mi) east of Zalegoshch	7./JG 51	102	10 October 1943	10:07	Yak-4	45 km (28 mi) northwest of Vitebsk	7./JG 51
62	13 July 1943	13:08	DB-3	PQ 35 Ost 63291; 25 km (16 mi) southeast of Zalegoshch	7./JG 51	103	14 October 1943	06:42	Yak-7	PQ 35 Ost 15552, 20 km (12 mi) northeast of Gorki	7./JG 51
63	13 July 1943	13:09	DB-3	PQ 35 Ost 63293; 25 km (16 mi) southeast of Zalegoshch	7./JG 51	104	20 October 1943	09:58	Yak-9	PQ 35 Ost 02258, 10 km (6.2 mi) southwest of Loyew	7./JG 51
64	13 July 1943	13:11	DB-3	PQ 35 63432, 27 km (17 mi) south-southwest of Novosil; 40 km (25 mi) east-southeast of Zmiyovka	7./JG 51	105	22 October 1943	10:07	Yak-9	PQ 35 Ost 03856, Loyew	7./JG 51
65	14 July 1943	18:28	Yak-7	PQ 35 Ost 64642; 10 km (6.2 mi) north of Mtsensk	7./JG 51	106	30 October 1943	11:58	Il-2 m.H.	PQ 35 Ost 03846, 28 km (17 mi) south-southeast of Rechytsa	7./JG 51
66	16 July 1943	07:57	LaGG-3	PQ 35 Ost 64387; 20 km (12 mi) northeast of Bolkhov	7./JG 51	107	10 November 1943	11:12	Yak-7	PQ 25 Ost 96261, Nevel	7./JG 51
67	17 July 1943	05:08? (Note: According to Mathews and Foreman claimed at 05:06.)	Pe-2	PQ 35 Ost 53215 vicinity of Naryshkino	7./JG 51	108	12 November 1943	12:58	La-5	PQ 35 Ost 06768; 15 km (9.3 mi) southeast of Vitebsk	7./JG 51
68	17 July 1943	07:14	LaGG-3	PQ 35 Ost 63633 vicinity of Maloarkhangelsk	7./JG 51	109	22 November 1943	10:21	Boston	PQ 35 Ost 03691; 10 km (6.2 mi) south of Gomel	7./JG 51
69	17 July 1943	07:16	Il-2 m.H.	PQ 35 Ost 63536; 25 km (16 mi) east-northeast of Maloarkhangelsk	7./JG 51	110	22 November 1943	10:27	Boston	PQ 35 Ost 03662; 20 km (12 mi) south of Gomel	7./JG 51
70	19 July 1943	08:57	MiG-3	PQ 35 Ost 64889; 20 km (12 mi) southeast of Mtsensk	7./JG 51	111	23 December 1943	11:47	Yak-9	PQ 35 Ost 03181; 20 km (12 mi) southeast of Zhlobin	7./JG 51
71	20 July 1943	17:03	La-5	PQ 35 Ost 64846; 20 km (12 mi) south of Mtsensk	7./JG 51	112	23 December 1943	11:53	Il-2	PQ 35 Ost 03326; 20 km (12 mi) south-southeast of Zhlobin	7./JG 51
72	28 July 1943	14:03	La-5	PQ 35 Ost 64488; 20 km (12 mi) west-northwest of Bolkhov	7./JG 51						
– Claims with III. Gruppe of Jagdgeschwader 51 "Mölders" on the Eastern Front – 1 January – 29 May 1944
113	25 January 1944	08:32	Yak-9	PQ 25 Ost 93467; 30 km (19 mi) south-southwest of Zhlobin	7./JG 51	126	23 February 1944	14:02	Yak-7	PQ 25 Ost 04714; 15 km (9.3 mi) north of Rogatschew	7./JG 51
114	25 January 1944	12:50	Yak-7	PQ 25 Ost 93751; 10 km (6.2 mi) north of Mazyr	7./JG 51	127	27 February 1944	10:57	Yak-7	PQ 35 Ost 04755; 10 km (6.2 mi) northeast of Rogatschew	7./JG 51
115	6 February 1944	11:42	Yak-7	PQ 25 Ost 96655; 15 km (9.3 mi) southwest of Gorodok	7./JG 51	? (Note: According to Prien, Stemmer, Balke and Bock this claim was considered a Staffelabschuss, a shared aerial victory attributed to the entire squadron and not exclusively to Weber.)	10 March 1944	15:51	Yak-7	PQ 35 Ost 05247; 20 km (12 mi) southwest of Liosno	7./JG 51
116	7 February 1944	11:54	P-40	PQ 35 Ost 06786; 15 km (9.3 mi) north-northwest of Mogilew	7./JG 51	?	10 March 1944	15:51	Yak-7	PQ 35 Ost 05247; 20 km (12 mi) southwest of Liosno	7./JG 51
117	7 February 1944	12:08	La-5	PQ 25 Ost 96664; 10 km (6.2 mi) south of Gorodok	7./JG 51	128	31 March 1944	11:29	Il-2 m.H.	PQ 25 Ost 42676; 15 km (9.3 mi) northwest of Kovel	7./JG 51
118	9 February 1944	13:47	Il-2	PQ 25 Ost 96685; 15 km (9.3 mi) southwest of Gorodok	7./JG 51	129	1 April 1944	09:42	Il-2 m.H.	PQ 25 Ost 42693; 20 km (12 mi) northwest of Kovel	7./JG 51
119	9 February 1944	13:51	Il-2	PQ 25 Ost 96654, northwest of Vitebsk; 20 km (12 mi) southwest of Gorodok	7./JG 51	130	1 April 1944	09:46	Il-2 m.H.	PQ 25 Ost 42646; 15 km (9.3 mi) northwest of Kovel	7./JG 51
120	12 February 1944	13:53	Yak-7	PQ 25 Ost 968357; 10 km (6.2 mi) south of Kamary	7./JG 51	131?	3 April 1944	09:11	Il-2 m.H.	PQ 25 Ost 42811	7./JG 51
121	12 February 1944	14:06	Yak-7	PQ 25 Ost 06772; 10 km (6.2 mi) northwest of Kamary	7./JG 51	132	3 April 1944	09:13	Il-2 m.H.	PQ 25 Ost 42854; 10 km (6.2 mi) south of Kovel	7./JG 51
122	18 February 1944	15:06	La-5	PQ 25 Ost 96682; 20 km (12 mi) southwest of Gorodok	7./JG 51	133	5 April 1944	08:58	Yak-7	PQ 25 Ost 42595; 15 km (9.3 mi) north of Lubomi	7./JG 51
123	22 February 1944	12:06	Boston	PQ 35 Ost 04553; 15 km (9.3 mi) south of Stara Bychow	7./JG 51	134	5 April 1944	09:18	Yak-7	PQ 25 Ost 42625 vicinity of Ukmerge	7./JG 51
124	22 February 1944	12:16	Il-2	PQ 35 Ost 04719; 15 km (9.3 mi) north of Rogatschew	7./JG 51	135	7 April 1944	12:28	Yak-7	PQ 25 Ost 42687; 10 km (6.2 mi) north of Kovel	7./JG 51
125	22 February 1944	15:48	Il-2	PQ 35 Ost 04752; 10 km (6.2 mi) northeast of Rogatschew	7./JG 51	136	17 April 1944	06:36	LaGG-3	PQ 25 Ost 42686; 10 km (6.2 mi) north of Kovel	7./JG 51

=== Awards ===
- Iron Cross (1939)
  - 2nd Class (6 July 1941)
  - 1st Class (17 August 1941)
- Honour Goblet of the Luftwaffe on 21 September 1942 as Leutnant and pilot (Note: According to Obermaier and Thomas on 30 September 1942.)
- German Cross in Gold on 16 March 1943 as Leutnant in the 7./Jagdgeschwader 51
- Knight's Cross of the Iron Cross with Oak Leaves
  - Knight's Cross on 12 November 1943 as Oberleutnant and Staffelführer of the 7./Jagdgeschwader 51 "Mölders"
  - 529th Oak Leaves on 20 July 1944 on (posthumously) and Hauptmann and Staffelkapitän of the 7./Jagdgeschwader 51 "Mölders"
