= Hartmann Grasser =

German World War II flying ace (1914–1986)

- Grasser as a Major
- Born: 23 August 1914; Graz, Austria
- Died: 2 June 1986 (aged 71); Cologne, West Germany
- Burial place: St. Leonhard-Cemetery, Graz, Austria
- Military career
- Allegiance: Nazi Germany
- Branch: Luftwaffe
- Service years: 1936–1945
- Rank: Major (major)
- Unit: JGr 152, ZG 52, ZG 2, JG 51, JG 1, JG 110
- Commands: II./JG 51, III./JG 1
- Conflicts: See battles World War II: Kanalkampf; Eastern Front; Operation Barbarossa; North African campaign; Tunisian Campaign
- Awards: Knight's Cross of the Iron Cross with Oak Leaves
- Other work: military advisor

Hartmann Grasser (23 August 1914 – 2 June 1986) was a World War II German fighter ace. He was credited with shooting down 103 Allied aircraft while flying 700 missions on the Western Front, Eastern Front, and in North Africa. He was also a recipient of the Knight's Cross of the Iron Cross with Oak Leaves.

== Early life and career ==
Grasser was born on 23 August 1914 in Graz, Steiermark, Austria. After he received his Abitur, he started studying medicine and became a member of the Austrian Nazis. Following the failed coup attempt in the July Putsch, Grasser fled to Germany. On 1 April 1936, Grasser then joined the Luftwaffe with the rank of Fahnenjunker (cadet). Following flight training, (Note: Flight training in the Luftwaffe progressed through the levels A1, A2 and B1, B2, referred to as A/B flight training. A training included theoretical and practical training in aerobatics, navigation, long-distance flights and dead-stick landings. The B courses included high-altitude flights, instrument flights, night landings and training to handle the aircraft in difficult situations.) he was posted to I. Gruppe (1st group) of Zerstörergeschwader 52 (ZG 52—52nd Destroyer Wing) where he served with 3. Staffel (3rd squadron) of ZG 52.

== World War II ==
World War II in Europe began on Friday 1 September 1939 when German forces invaded Poland. At the time ZG 52 was commanded by Hauptmann Wilhelm Lessmann and was based at Biblis where it was tasked with protecting Germany's western border in the Saar region during the "Phoney War". On 16 September, Grasser shot down a tethered balloon. The following day, he was awarded the Iron Cross second Class (Eisernes Kreuz zweiter Klasse). A week later, on 24 September 1939, his Messerschmitt Bf 109 109 D-1 was damaged in combat with a French Morane-Saulnier M.S.406, resulting in a forced landing at Bingen. That day, I. Gruppe of ZG 52 was also renamed and became the Jagdgruppe 152 (JGr. 152—152nd Fighter Group). On 6 January 1940, JGr. 152 was ordered to Graz where it was reequipped with the Messerschmitt Bf 110 heavy fighter and was renamed, again becoming the I. Gruppe of ZG 52. This unit was then renamed and became the II. Gruppe of Zerstörergeschwader 2 (ZG 2—2nd Destroyer Wing). In consequence, Grasser became a pilot of 6. Staffel. Flying with this squadron, he participated in the Battle of France and Battle of England and claimed six aerial victories. During these campaigns, Grasser was promoted to Oberleutnant (first lieutenant) on 1 June 1940 and received the Iron Cross first Class (Eisernes Kreuz erster Klasse) on 7 July.

=== With Jagdgeschwader 51 ===
In October 1940, Grasser was transferred to Jagdgeschwader 51 (JG 51—51st Fighter Wing). There, he was assigned to the Geschwaderstab (headquarters unit) headed by Oberstleutnant Werner Mölders. Prior to his posting to JG 51, Grasser had been destined to become a night fighter pilot which was not what he wanted to do. Additionally, he helped in the formation of the Z-Staffel (Z—Zerstörer or destroyer) of Jagdgeschwader 77 (JG 77—77th Fighter Wing) which later became part of Jagdgeschwader 5 (JG 5—5th Fighter Wing). Grasser also served as a test pilot, flying the Bf 109 T, the aircraft carrier variant, which were to be produced at Fieseler in Kassel. His acquaintance, Oberleutnant Hans Kolbow, introduced him to Mölders who arranged the transfer to JG 51 instead.

Grasser claimed his first aerial victory flying with JG 51 on 1 December 1940 when he shot down a Royal Air Force (RAF) Hawker Hurricane fighter near Ashford.

=== On the Eastern Front ===
In June 1941, JG 51 and the majority of the Luftwaffe were transferred to the Eastern Front in preparation for Operation Barbarossa, the invasion of the Soviet Union. On 16 July 1941, Kolbow, the Staffelkapitän (squadron leader) of 5. Staffel was killed in action. He was replaced by Leutnant Hans-Joachim Steffens who was also killed in action shortly after. On 1 August, command of 5. Staffel was then handed to Grasser. The Staffel was a squadron of II. Gruppe, at the time commanded by Hauptmann Hubertus von Bonin. On 11 October, the Gruppe was briefly detached from the Geschwaderstab of JG 51 and ordered east to Oryol. There, the Gruppe was subordinated to Gefechtsverband Schönborn (Detachment Schönborn), named after the commander of Sturzkampfgeschwader 77 (StG 77—77th Diver Bomber Wing), Major Clemens Graf von Schönborn-Wiesentheid. On 24 January 1942, Grasser attacked and shot down an Ilyushin DB-3 bomber. However, his Bf 109 F-2 (Werknummer 9704—factory number) was also hit by the aerial gunner of the DB-3 bomber resulting in a forced landing in no man's land. Grasser, who was wounded in the encounter, was rescued by the German infantry.

In May 1942, II. Gruppe was based at Bryansk but periodically also operated from airfields at Oryol and Dugino. On 2 July, the 9th Army launched Operation Seydlitz as part of the Battles of Rzhev. Defending against this operation, the Soviet Air Forces (VVS—Voyenno-Vozdushnye Sily) attacked the Luftwaffe airfield at Bryansk on 5 July. II. Gruppe of JG 51 was scrambled and claimed 46 Soviet aircraft shot down for the loss of two Bf 109s damaged. That day, Grasser claimed eight aerial victories, making him an "ace-in-a-day".

=== North Africa ===
II. Gruppe had been withdrawn from the Eastern Front in early October 1942 and sent to Jesau in East Prussia, present day Yushny, Bagrationovsky District, for conversion to the Focke-Wulf Fw 190. Conversion training began on 7 October and on 4 November, the unit received the order to convert back to the Bf 109 and to transfer to the Mediterranean theatre. Via various stopovers, II. Gruppe moved to Sidi Ahmed airfield, arriving on 14 November. There, the unit was subordinated to Fliegerführer Tunis (Flying Leader Tunis). On 28 March 1943, Grasser bailed out of his Bf 109 G-4 trop (Werknummer 15040) near Djemmal south of Sousse. On 18 April, II. Gruppe received orders to exchange their newer Bf 109 G-4 and G-6 aircraft with older Bf 109 G-2 trop aircraft of JG 77 and retreat from Africa to Bari, Italy.

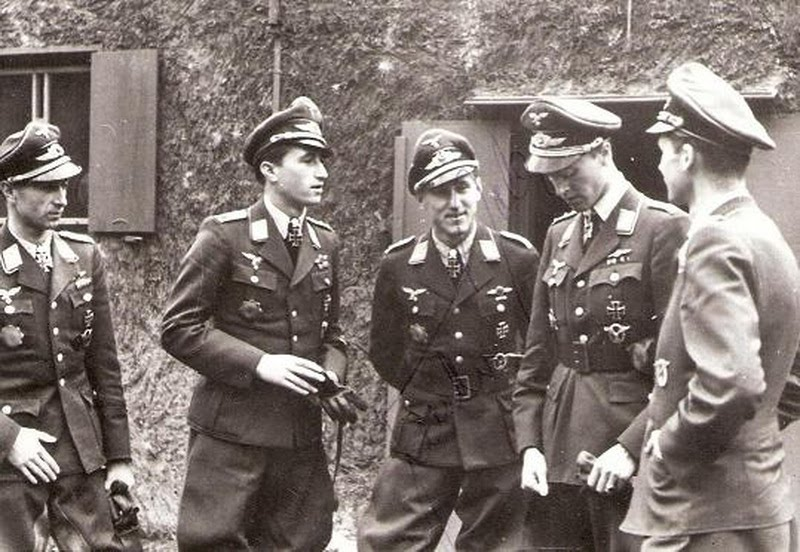
Grasser (left), Nowotny, Rall, Prinz zu Sayn-Wittgenstein at Rastenburg

On 6 June, Grasser was transferred to the staff of commanding general of the 4. Jagd-Division (4th Fighter Division). Command of II. Gruppe was then given to Oberleutnant Karl Rammelt who had led 4. Staffel. On 31 August, Grasser was awarded the Knight's Cross of the Iron Cross with Oak Leaves (Ritterkreuz des Eisernen Kreuzes mit Eichenlaub). He was the 288th member of the German armed forces to be so honored. The presentation was made by Adolf Hitler at the Wolf's Lair, Hitler's headquarters in Rastenburg on 22 September 1943. Three other Luftwaffe officers were presented with awards that day by Hitler, Hauptmann Günther Rall and Hauptmann Walter Nowotny were awarded the Swords to their Knight's Cross with Oak Leaves, and Hauptmann Heinrich Prinz zu Sayn-Wittgenstein also received the Knight's Cross with Oak Leaves. Grasser was promoted to Major on 1 December 1943.

On 28 April 1944, Grasser succeeded Hauptmann Friedrich Eberle as commander of III. Gruppe of Jagdgeschwader 1 (JG 1—1st Fighter Wing) which was based at Quedlinburg and fighting in Defense of the Reich. On 3 June, Grasser transferred command of III. Gruppe to Hauptmann Karl-Heinz Weber who had previously commanded 7. Staffel of JG 1 on the Eastern Front. On 15 October, Grasser took command of II. Gruppe of Jagdgeschwader 110 (JG 110—110th Fighter Wing).

== Later life ==
In May 1945, Grasser was taken prisoner of war by the United States Army. In 1946, he was transferred to the Soviet Union and was released in 1949. Following his return to Germany, he relocated to India where he became a civilian flight instructor. In 1950, he moved to Syria to work as a military advisor to the Syrian Air Force in Damascus. After his return to Germany, he settled with his wife and two sons in Cologne. There, he owned and operated a sheet metal factory. Grasser died on 2 June 1986 in Cologne and was interred in his hometown Graz.

== Summary of career ==
=== Aerial victory claims ===
According to US historian David T. Zabecki, Grasser was credited with 103 aerial victories. Mathews and Foreman, authors of Luftwaffe Aces — Biographies and Victory Claims, researched the German Federal Archives and found records for more than 96 aerial victory claims, plus six further unconfirmed claims. This figure includes 83 aerial victories on the Eastern Front and over 13 on the Western Front, including one four-engined bomber.

Victory claims were logged to a map-reference (PQ = Planquadrat), for example "PQ 47524". The Luftwaffe grid map (Jägermeldenetz) covered all of Europe, western Russia and North Africa and was composed of rectangles measuring 15 minutes of latitude by 30 minutes of longitude, an area of about 360 square miles (930 km^{2}). These sectors were then subdivided into 36 smaller units to give a location area 3 km × 4 km (1.9 mi × 2.5 mi) in size.

Chronicle of aerial victories
This and the ♠ (Ace of spades) indicates those aerial victories which made Grasser an "ace-in-a-day", a term which designates a fighter pilot who has shot down five or more airplanes in a single day. This and the – (dash) indicates unconfirmed aerial victory claims for which Grasser did not receive credit. This and the ! (exclamation mark) indicates those aerial victories listed by Forsyth or by Prien, Stemmer, Rodeike and Bock. This and the # (hash mark) indicates those aerial victories listed by Mathews and Foreman. This and the ? (question mark) indicates information discrepancies listed by Prien, Stemmer, Rodeike, Bock, Mathews and Foreman.
Claim!	Claim#	Date	Time	Type	Location	Claim!	Claim#	Date	Time	Type	Location
– 3. Staffel of Jagdgruppe 152 – "Phoney War" — 1 September 1939 – 9 May 1940
1		16 September 1939	—	tethered balloon			1	24 September 1939	—	Curtiss	near Hornbach
According to Mathews and Foreman, aerial victories 2 to 5 are not documented in the German Federal Archives.
– Stab of Jagdgeschwader 51 – At the Channel and over England — 26 June 1940 – 26 July 1941
7	6	1 December 1940	15:16	Hurricane	Ashford	—	—	16 April 1941	18:42	Spitfire	Berck-sur-Mer
– Stab of Jagdgeschwader 51 – Operation Barbarossa — 22 June – 5 December 1941
8	7	22 June 1941	12:37	SB-2		15	13	1 July 1941	14:50	DB-3	
9	8	25 June 1941	12:32	SB-2		16	14	7 July 1941	19:30	V-11 (Il-2)	
10	9	29 June 1941	18:30	V-11 (Il-2)		17	15	10 July 1941	07:50	R-Z? (Note: According to Mathews and Foreman claimed as Polikarpov R-5.)	
11	10	29 June 1941	19:55	I-16		18	16	11 July 1941	09:55	DB-3	
12	11	30 June 1941	11:45	DB-3		19	—	12 July 1941	18:50	DB-3	
13	—	30 June 1941	15:45	DB-3		20	17	13 July 1941	19:25	DB-3	
14	12	30 June 1941	15:50	DB-3							
– 5. Staffel of Jagdgeschwader 51 – Operation Barbarossa — 26 July – 5 December 1941
21	18	26 July 1941	16:52	Boston		31	28	2 October 1941	10:55	I-18 (MiG-1)	
22	19	26 July 1941	19:20	R-5		32	29	5 October 1941	14:27	DB-3	northeast of Sevsk
23	20	29 July 1941	18:30? (Note: According to Mathews and Foreman claimed at 12:30.)	SB-3		33	30	5 October 1941	14:30	DB-3	northeast of Sevsk
24	21	29 July 1941	18:36	SB-3		34	31	7 October 1941	14:10	Pe-2	
25	22	9 August 1941	13:50	Pe-2		—	—	8 October 1941	—	Pe-2	
26	23	26 August 1941	18:16	Boston	15 km (9.3 mi) east of Kaluga	35	32	22 October 1941	14:59	I-61 (MiG-3)	
27	24	30 August 1941	17:42	I-18 (MiG-3)		36	33	24 October 1941	14:10	SB-2	
28	25	30 August 1941	17:45	Pe-2		37	34	5 November 1941	09:32	DB-3	
29	26	2 September 1941	07:06	R-5	50 km (31 mi) southeast of Sechtschinskaja	38	35	16 November 1941	09:53? (Note: According to Mathews and Foreman claimed at 09:55.)	DB-3	
30	27	7 September 1941	17:20	I-61? (Note: According to Mathews and Foreman claimed as a Tupolev SB-3.)	25 km (16 mi) east of Karlewez	39	36	2 December 1941	11:10	Pe-2	
– 5. Staffel of Jagdgeschwader 51 – Eastern Front — 6 December 1941 – 24 January 1942
40	37	6 December 1941	14:10	I-61 (MiG-3)	5 km (3.1 mi) east of Kashira	44	41	11 January 1942	14:05	Pe-2	
41	38	14 December 1941	09:20	Pe-2		45	42	19 January 1942	12:20	DB-3	
42	39	4 January 1942	12:15	Pe-2		46	43	24 January 1942	12:45	DB-3	
43	40	4 January 1942	12:50	Pe-2							
– Stab II. Gruppe of Jagdgeschwader 51 – Eastern Front — March – 30 April 1942
47	44	31 March 1942	12:10	LaGG-3		49	46	7 April 1942	10:50	LaGG-3	east of Kschen
48	45	31 March 1942	15:12	LaGG-3							
– Stab II. Gruppe of Jagdgeschwader 51 – Eastern Front — 1 May – 7 October 1942
50	47	21 May 1942	06:55	R-Z?		71	68	10 August 1942	17:10	Pe-2	PQ 47524; 20 km (12 mi) south-southwest of Rzhev
51	48	23 June 1942	11:40	I-153		72	69	13 August 1942	18:03	Yak-1	PQ 54294; 15 km (9.3 mi) west of Belyov
52	49	25 June 1942	11:29	I-16		73	70	20 August 1942	11:55	MiG-3	PQ 64142; 5 km (3.1 mi) northwest of Belyov
53	50	26 June 1942	11:15	Yak-1		74	71	21 August 1942	11:35	LaGG-3	PQ 55884, west of Kozelsk
54		3 July 1942	05:10	I-153		75	72	22 August 1942	16:00	Pe-2	PQ 54434; 20 km (12 mi) southwest of Belyov
55♠	51♠	5 July 1942	04:46	Yak-1		76	73	23 August 1942	06:40	Il-2	PQ 54412; 30 km (19 mi) northeast of Dudorovskiy
56♠	52♠	5 July 1942	04:55	Pe-2		77	74	23 August 1942	07:00	Il-2	PQ 55883 vicinity of Kozelsk
	53♠	5 July 1942	05:10	I-153		78	75	23 August 1942	17:33	Il-2	PQ 54422; 25 km (16 mi) west-southwest of Belyov
57♠	54♠	5 July 1942	09:33	Il-2		79	76	25 August 1942	06:32	Pe-2	PQ 64173; 5 km (3.1 mi) southwest of Belyov
58♠	55♠	5 July 1942	09:40	Il-2		80	77	27 August 1942	17:55	Yak-1	PQ 64793; 15 km (9.3 mi) northwest of Zalegoshch
—	—	5 July 1942	—	LaGG-3		81	78	28 August 1942	14:00	Il-2	north-northwest of Bolkhov
59♠	56♠	5 July 1942	13:50	Yak-1	15 km (9.3 mi) north of Bolkhov	82	79	29 August 1942	11:35	LaGG-3	PQ 54224 vicinity of Kozelsk
60♠	57♠	5 July 1942	14:27	Il-2		83	80	3 September 1942	13:30	LaGG-3	northeast of Sychyovka
61♠	58♠	5 July 1942	19:30	Il-2		84	81	4 September 1942	11:52	I-153	PQ 73151, east-southeast of Novosil vicinity of Verkhovye
62	59	9 July 1942	05:15	I-153		85	82	10 September 1942	10:22	LaGG-3	PQ 47824; 10 km (6.2 mi) east of Zubtsov
63	60	9 July 1942	05:16	I-153		86	83	10 September 1942	15:05	MiG-3	PQ 44132; 20 km (12 mi) south-southeast of Kirov
64	61	18 July 1942	11:35	Yak-1		87	84	14 September 1942	17:00	Il-2	PQ 47593 vicinity of Rzhev
65	62	2 August 1942	15:12	Il-2	PQ 47582; 10 km (6.2 mi) west of Rzhev	88	85	14 September 1942	17:22	Il-2	PQ 47591 vicinity of Rzhev
66	63	2 August 1942	18:05	Pe-2	PQ 47572; 20 km (12 mi) west of Rzhev	89	86	26 September 1942	09:25	R-5	PQ 47483; 10 km (6.2 mi) west of Staritsa
67	64	4 August 1942	06:35	MiG-3	PQ 47552; 15 km (9.3 mi) south-southwest of Rzhev	90	87	26 September 1942	09:26	R-5	PQ 47483; 10 km (6.2 mi) west of Staritsa
68	65	4 August 1942	06:40	MiG-3	PQ 47551; 15 km (9.3 mi) south-southwest of Rzhev	91	88	27 September 1942	07:55	LaGG-3	PQ 47542; 20 km (12 mi) northwest of Rzhev
69	66	4 August 1942	12:05	LaGG-3	PQ 47524; 20 km (12 mi) south-southwest of Rzhev	92	89	1 October 1942	11:45	Pe-2	15 km (9.3 mi) northeast of Karmanowo
70	67	5 August 1942	17:00	Il-2	PQ 56164; 45 km (28 mi) north-northeast of Gagarin	—	—	4 October 1942	—	unknown	
– Stab II. Gruppe of Jagdgeschwader 51 – Mediterranean Theater — 5 November – 31 December 1942
93		17 November 1942	12:12	Spitfire	20 km (12 mi) west of Bizerte	97	93	2 December 1942	09:53	P-38	30 km (19 mi) west of Tebourba
94	90	27 November 1942	09:19	Spitfire	12 km (7.5 mi) south of Béja	98	94	4 December 1942	10:30	P-38	18 km (11 mi) north of Majaz al Bab
95	91	28 November 1942	09:15? (Note: According to Mathews and Foreman claimed at 09:45.)	Lysander	2 km (1.2 mi) west of Majaz al Bab	99	95	5 December 1942	10:45	Spitfire	8 km (5.0 mi) west of Tebourba
96	92	2 December 1942	09:40? (Note: According to Mathews and Foreman claimed at 09:45.)	P-38	6 km (3.7 mi) south of Tebourba						
– Stab II. Gruppe of Jagdgeschwader 51 – North Africa — 1 January – 6 June 1943
100	96	2 January 1943	12:25? (Note: According to Mathews and Foreman claimed at 12:26 as a Consolidated B-24 Liberator.)	Lancaster?	southeast of Majaz al Bab	102	99	22 March 1943	14:10	Spitfire	12 km (7.5 mi) south of Gabès; 12 km (7.5 mi) south of Mareth
	97	2 January 1943	12:27	P-38	southwest of Majaz al Bab	103	100	26 March 1943	12:28	P-38	9 km (5.6 mi) north of Maknassy; 4 km (2.5 mi) north of Mansoura
101	98	21 March 1943	13:07	Spitfire	30 km (19 mi) southeast of Gabès						

=== Awards ===
- Iron Cross (1939)
  - 2nd Class (17 September 1939)
  - 1st Class (7 July 1940)
- German Cross in Gold on 19 September 1942 as Hauptmann in the II./Jagdgeschwader 51
- Knight's Cross of the Iron Cross with Oak Leaves
  - Knight's Cross on 4 September 1941 as Oberleutnant and pilot in the II./Jagdgeschwader 51 (Note: According to Scherzer as pilot in the Stab/Jagdgeschwader 51.)
  - 288th Oak Leaves on 31 August 1943 as Major and Gruppenkommandeur of the II./Jagdgeschwader 51 "Mölders"

=== Promotions ===
1 January 1938:	Leutnant (second lieutenant)
1 June 1940:	Oberleutnant (first lieutenant)
1 August 1942:	Hauptmann (captain)
1 December 1943:	Major (major)
