= Georg Seelmann =

German fighter pilot during World War II (1917–1989)

- Born: 4 February 1917; Bamberg
- Died: 18 September 1989 (aged 72); Lichtenfels
- Military career
- Allegiance: Nazi Germany
- Branch: Luftwaffe
- Service years: 1937–1945
- Rank: Oberleutnant (first lieutenant)
- Units: JG 77, JG 51, JG 103
- Commands: 4./JG 51, 11./JG 51
- Conflicts: World War II; Battle of France; Battle of Britain; Operation Barbarossa; Operation Torch
- Awards: Knight's Cross of the Iron Cross

Georg Seelmann (4 February 1917 – 18 September 1989) was a German Luftwaffe ace and recipient of the Knight's Cross of the Iron Cross during World War II. The Knight's Cross of the Iron Cross, and its variants were the highest awards in the military and paramilitary forces of Nazi Germany during World War II - for the fighter pilots, it was a quantifiable measure of skill and success.

== Early life and career ==
Seelmann was born on 4 February 1917 in Bamberg in the Kingdom of Bavaria within the German Empire. On 3 November 1937, he joined the military of service of the Luftwaffe and was trained as a fighter pilot. (Note: Flight training in the Luftwaffe progressed through the levels A1, A2 and B1, B2, referred to as A/B flight training. A training included theoretical and practical training in aerobatics, navigation, long-distance flights and dead-stick landings. The B courses included high-altitude flights, instrument flights, night landings and training to handle the aircraft in difficult situations.) Seelmann began his flight training at Herzogenaurach Airfield and Dornstadt before in July 1939 transferring to the Jagdfliegerschule (fighter pilot school) in Schleißheim where he completed his fighter pilot training. In September 1939, Seelmann was posted to 2. Staffel (2nd squadron) of Jagdgeschwader 77 (JG 77—77th Fighter Wing), a squadron of I. Gruppe (1st group) of JG 77. At the time, I. Gruppe was based at Oedheim in southern Germany. The Gruppe relocated to Frankfurt Rhein-Main to protect the Zeppelin hangar.

== World War II ==
World War II in Europe had begun on Friday, 1 September 1939, when German forces invaded Poland. Seelmann claimed hist first aerial victory during the Battle of France on 14 May 1940, when he shot down a Morane-Saulnier M.S.406 fighter near Charleroi. On 25 August 1940, I. Gruppe of JG 77 relocated from Wyk auf Föhr to Marquise located near the English Channel to fight in the Battle of Britain. On 7 September 1940, I. Gruppe participated in Operation "Loge", 350 bombers escorted by 648 fighters, attacked various targets in the greater London area. On this mission, Seelmann claimed a Royal Air Force (RAF) Supermarine Spitfire fighter shot down at 18:05 and another one at 18:30. For his two aerial victories claimed to date, he was awarded the Iron Cross 1st Class (Eisernes Kreuz erster Klasse) on 29 September.

Following the Battle of Britain, the Luftwaffe fighter units were consolidated. On 21 November 1940, I. Gruppe of JG 77 was officially redesignated and became IV. Gruppe of Jagdgeschwader 51 (JG 51—51st Fighter Wing). In consequence, Seelman's 2. Staffel of JG 77 became 11. Staffel of JG 51. On 5 March 1941, Seelmann was forced to bail out of his Messerschmitt Bf 109 E-4 (Werknummer 5255–factory number) after his engine exploded over Wideham.

=== Operation Barbarossa ===
On 15 June, IV. Gruppe began transferring east and was located at the airfield Krzewicze, approximately 70 km (43 mi) west Brest-Litovsk on the western bank of the Bug River. On 22 June, German forces launched Operation Barbarossa, the German invasion of the Soviet Union. JG 51, under the command of Oberstleutnant Werner Mölders, was subordinated to II. Fliegerkorps (2nd Air Corps), which as part of Luftflotte 2 (Air Fleet 2). JG 51 area of operation during Operation Barbarossa was over the right flank of Army Group Center in the combat area of the 2nd Panzer Group as well as the 4th Army. In these initial weeks, Seelmann was particularly successful over the poorly trained and led Russian pilots. He quickly reached his 20th victory on 16 July and then his 30th on 9 August. On 30 August, Seelmann's Bf 109 F-2 (Werknummer 9647) was rammed by a Soviet aircraft, forcing him to bail out near Novgorod. He successfully evaded capture and made his way back to his unit. On 6 October 1941, Seelmann, together with Unteroffizier Franz-Josef Beerenbrock, were awarded the Knight's Cross of the Iron Cross (Ritterkreuz des Eisernen Kreuzes) after 37 and 42 aerial victories respectively.

=== Instructor and squadron leader ===
On 26 December 1941, Seelmann was posted to Ergänzungsgruppe JG 51 - the Geschwader's training squadron - as an instructor and Staffelkapitän (squadron leader) of 2. Staffel, replacing Oberleutnant Egon Falkensamer. The unit was based at La Rochelle, France. In January 1942, 2. Staffel of Ergänzungsgruppe JG 51 moved to Kraków where in February it became the newly formed Ergänzungs-Jagdgruppe Ost (Erg. Ost—Supplementary Fighter Group East). Consequently, Seelmann then commanded 1. Staffel of Erg. Ost.

Seelmann returned to front-line duty on 1 August 1942, taking command of 11. Staffel of JG 51 as the Staffelkapitän, replacing Hauptmann Franz Hahn. At the time, IV. Gruppe was based at Novodugino. Two days later, Seelmann was shot down in aerial combat with Ilyushin DB-3 bombers in an area 15 kilometers (9.3 miles) southwest of Rzhev. He bailed out of his Bf 109 F-2 (Werknummer 12652). Severely injured, Seelmann was temporarily replaced by Leutnant Wolfgang Böwing-Treuding before command of 11. Staffel was passed on to Oberleutnant Adolf Borchers on 20 August.

=== Mediterranean theatre ===
II. Gruppe of JG 51 had been withdrawn from the Eastern Front in early October 1942 and sent to Jesau in East Prussia, present day Yushny, Bagrationovsky District, for conversion to the Focke-Wulf Fw 190. Conversion training began on 7 October and on 4 November, the unit received the order to convert back to the Bf 109 and to transfer to the Mediterranean theatre. Via various stopovers, II. Gruppe moved to Sidi Ahmed airfield, arriving on 14 November. There, the unit was subordinated to Fliegerführer Tunis (Flying Leader Tunis). During this period, Seelmann had recovered from his injuries and was given command of 4. Staffel on 5 November.

On 17 March 1943, Seelmann transferred command of 4. Staffel to Oberleutnant Karl Rammelt. After further recuperation, in summer 1943 he was instead transferred to a non-combat role as the Staffelkapitän for the training squadron 1. Staffel of Jagdgeschwader 103, where he ended his successful combat career.

== Later life ==
Seelmann died on 18 September 1989 at the age of 72 in Lichtenfels, West Germany.

== Summary of career ==
=== Aerial victory claims ===
According to Obermaier, Seelmann flew 550 combat missions and was credited with 39 aerial victories. Mathews and Foreman, authors of Luftwaffe Aces — Biographies and Victory Claims, researched the German Federal Archives and found records for 39 aerial victory claims, including three aerial victories on the Western Front and 36 on the Eastern Front.

Victory claims were logged to a map-reference (PQ = Planquadrat), for example "PQ 47582". The Luftwaffe grid map (Jägermeldenetz) covered all of Europe, western Russia and North Africa and was composed of rectangles measuring 15 minutes of latitude by 30 minutes of longitude, an area of about 360 square miles (930 km^{2}). These sectors were then subdivided into 36 smaller units to give a location area 3 km × 4 km (1.9 mi × 2.5 mi) in size.

Chronicle of aerial victories
Claim	Date	Time	Type	Location	Claim	Date	Time	Type	Location
– 2. Staffel of Jagdgeschwader 77 – Battle of France — 10–23 May 1940
1	14 May 1940	11:40	M.S.406	15 km (9.3 mi) south of Charleroi					
– 2. Staffel of Jagdgeschwader 77 – Battle of Britain and on the English Channel — 25 August – 20 November 1941
2	7 September 1940	18:30	Spitfire						
– 2. Staffel of Jagdgeschwader 77 – Battle of Britain and on the English Channel — 21 November 1940 – 7 June 1941
3	16 April 1941	18:35	Hurricane	southeast of Dungeness					
– 11. Staffel of Jagdgeschwader 51 – Operation Barbarossa — 22 June – 5 December 1941
4	22 June 1941	07:05	I-153		22	23 July 1941	18:16	DB-3	
5	22 June 1941	16:14	DB-3		23	24 July 1941	08:11	I-16	
6	24 June 1941	09:27	SB-3		24	31 July 1941	04:37	Pe-2	
7	24 June 1941	09:29	SB-3		25	3 August 1941	12:25	I-16	
8	29 June 1941	18:34	ZKB-19		26	4 August 1941	07:25	R-3	
9	2 July 1941	19:32	DB-3		27	8 August 1941	08:47	Pe-2	
10	2 July 1941	19:35	DB-3		28	8 August 1941	15:08	DB-3	
11	4 July 1941	15:00	SB-2		29	8 August 1941	15:29	DB-3	
12	4 July 1941	15:03	SB-2		30	9 August 1941	13:17	Pe-2	7 km (4.3 mi) southeast of Yelnya
13	5 July 1941	05:58	DB-3		31	19 August 1941	19:14	I-153	
14	6 July 1941	16:30	ZKB-19		32	25 August 1941	18:12	R-10	
15	9 July 1941	04:32	I-16		33	26 August 1941	17:58	R-10	
16	11 July 1941	15:32	I-16		34	30 August 1941	07:35	SB-3	
17	13 July 1941	12:25	Pe-2		35	30 August 1941	11:55	DB-3	
18	14 July 1941	12:29	DB-3		36	30 August 1941	17:50	DB-3	Shatalovka
19	15 July 1941	14:12	DB-3		37	24 September 1941	16:30	I-18	
20	16 July 1941	10:12	DB-3		38	8 October 1941	14:55	Pe-2	
21	23 July 1941	18:12	DB-3						
– 11. Staffel of Jagdgeschwader 51 "Mölders" – Eastern Front — 1–3 August 1942
39	2 August 1942	17:50	Il-2	PQ 47582; 10 km (6.2 mi) west of Rzhev					

=== Awards ===
- Flugzeugführerabzeichen
- Front Flying Clasp of the Luftwaffe
- Iron Cross (1939)
  - 2nd Class
  - 1st Class (29 September 1940)
- Wound Badge (1939)
  - in Black or Silver
- Knight's Cross of the Iron Cross on 6 October 1941 as Leutnant and Staffelkapitän of the 11./Jagdgeschwader 51 (Note: According to Scherzer as Leutnant of the Reserves.)

== Notes ==
Military offices
Preceded by Hptm Franz Hahn	Squadron Leader of 11./JG 51; September, 1941 – 25 December 1941	Succeeded by Hptm Franz Hahn
Preceded by Oblt Egon Falkensamer	Squadron Leader of 2.(Erg)/JG 51; 26 December 1941 – 26 January 1942	Succeeded by unit renamed 1./EJGr.Ost
Preceded by new unit	Squadron Leader of 1./EJGr.Ost; 27 January 1942 – 24 June 1942	Unknown
Preceded by Hptm Franz Hahn	Squadron Leader of 11./JG 51; 1 August 1942 – 7 October 1942	Succeeded by Oblt Adolf Borchers
Preceded by Oblt Harald Jung	Squadron Leader of 4./JG 51; 9 October 1942 – March, 1943	Succeeded by Oblt Karl Rammelt
Unknown	Squadron Leader of 1./JG 103; July, 1943 – 15 March 1945	Succeeded by none: unit disbanded
