= Karl Rammelt =

German World War II fighter pilot and officer in the German Air Force

- Born: 10 June 1914; Nebra
- Died: 13 May 2009 (aged 94); Fürstenfeldbruck, Germany
- Military career
- Allegiance: Nazi Germany; West Germany
- Branch: Luftwaffe (Wehrmacht); German Air Force (Bundeswehr)
- Service years: 1934–1945; 1956–1969
- Rank: Major (Wehrmacht); Oberstleutnant (Bundeswehr)
- Unit: JG 51
- Commands: II./JG 51
- Conflicts: World War II: Eastern Front; North African Campaign; Defence of the Reich
- Awards: Knight's Cross of the Iron Cross

Karl Rammelt (10 June 1914 – 13 May 2009) was a German Luftwaffe ace and recipient of the Knight's Cross of the Iron Cross during World War II. The Knight's Cross of the Iron Cross, and its variants were the highest awards in the military and paramilitary forces of Nazi Germany during World War II. Rammelt was credited with 46 aerial victories in 450 combat missions.

== Early life and career ==
Rammelt was born on 10 June 1914 in Nebra, then in the Province of Saxony within the German Empire. He joined the military service of the Luftwaffe in 1934, serving on the technical ground staff until 1940. Following flight fighter pilot training, (Note: Flight training in the Luftwaffe progressed through the levels A1, A2 and B1, B2, referred to as A/B flight training. A training included theoretical and practical training in aerobatics, navigation, long-distance flights and dead-stick landings. The B courses included high-altitude flights, instrument flights, night landings, and training to handle the aircraft in difficult situations.) Rammelt was posted to II. Gruppe of Jagdgeschwader 51 (JG 51—51st Fighter Wing) in May 1942.

== World War II ==
World War II in Europe had begun on Friday 1 September 1939 when German forces invaded Poland. In May 1942, II. Gruppe was commanded by Hauptmann Hartmann Grasser and based at Bryansk but periodically also operated from airfields at Oryol and Dugino on the Eastern Front. On 2 July, the 9th Army launched Operation Seydlitz as part of the Battles of Rzhev. Defending against this operation, the Soviet Air Forces (VVS—Voyenno-Vozdushnye Sily) attacked the Luftwaffe airfield at Bryansk on 5 July. II. Gruppe of JG 51 was scrambled and claimed 46 Soviet aircraft shot down for the loss of two Bf 109s damaged. That day, Rammelt claimed five aerial victories, two Petlyakov Pe-2 bombers and three Ilyushin Il-2 ground-attack aircraft, making him an "ace-in-a-day". On 3 September 1942, Rammelt's Messerschmitt Bf 109 F-2 (Werknummer 12808–factory number) ran out of fuel, resulting in an emergency landing at Dugino.

=== North Africa ===
II. Gruppe had been withdrawn from the Eastern Front in early October 1942 and sent to Jesau in East Prussia, present day Yushny, Bagrationovsky District, for conversion to the Focke-Wulf Fw 190. Conversion training began on 7 October and on 4 November, the unit received the order to convert back to the Bf 109 and to transfer to the Mediterranean theatre. Via various stopovers, II. Gruppe moved to Sidi Ahmed airfield, arriving on 14 November. There, the unit was subordinated to Fliegerführer Tunis (Flying Leader Tunis). On 27 November, Rammelt claimed his first aerial victory in North Africa. The Gruppe had encountered squadrons of the Royal Air Force (RAF) No. 324 Wing from Souk-el-Arba Airfield. In the encounter, Rammelt claimed a Supermarine Spitfire fighter shot down 12 kilometers (7.5 miles) southwest of Béja.

On 4 February 1943, the United States Army Air Forces (USAAF) 97th Bombardment Group sent 18 Boeing B-17 Flying Fortress bombers against an airfield west of Gabès. Defending against this attack, Rammelt claimed one of the B-17 bombers shot down, which was not confirmed. On 17 March, Rammelt was appointed Staffelkapitän (squadron leader) of 4. Staffel of JG 51, succeeding Oberleutnant Georg Seelmann. On 18 April, II. Gruppe received orders to exchange their newer Bf 109 G-4 and G-6 aircraft with older Bf 109 G-2 trop aircraft of Jagdgeschwader 77 (JG 77—77th Fighter Wing) and retreat from Africa to Bari, Italy. On 20 March, II. Gruppe engaged in combat with fighters of the USAAF 31st Fighter Group. In this engagement, Rammelt claimed a Curtiss P-40 Warhawk fighter shot down 30 kilometers (19 miles) northwest of Maknassy. On 29 March, he claimed another P-40 fighter shot down in an area 10 kilometers (6.2 miles) northeast of Skhira.

On 7 June, Rammelt was appointed Gruppenkommandeur (group commander) of II. Gruppe of JG 51. Rammelt had unofficially led the Gruppe since his predecessor, Hauptmann Hartmann Grasser, had left in April. In consequence, command of 4. Staffel was given to Oberleutnant Horst Walther.

=== Defense of the Reich ===
On 18 August, II. Gruppe relocated to Neubiberg Airfield near Munich for combat in defense of the Reich mission where they received factory new Bf 109 G-6 aircraft. On 28 December, Rammelt claimed a Consolidated B-24 Liberator bomber of the USAAF Fifteenth Air Force shot down south of Padua. Hit by the defensive fire, he was then wounded when he bailed out of his Bf 109 G-6 (Werknummer 160717) south of Rovigo. During his convalescence until March 1944, Rammelt was replaced by Hauptmann Günther Rübell. On 24 October 1944, Rammelt was awarded the Knight's Cross of the Iron Cross (Ritterkreuz des Eisernen Kreuzes) for 40 aerial victories claimed. On 23 December, Rammelt was again wounded when he bailed out of his Bf 109 G-14 (Werknummer 780887) in a location 20 miles (32 kilometers) north of Esztergom. Due to his injuries sustained, command of II. Gruppe was passed to Oberleutnant Otto Schultz.

== Later life ==
Following World War II, Rammelt applied for service in the West German Air Force, at the time referred to as the Bundesluftwaffe of the Bundeswehr. On 1 June 1956, he was appointed the first commander of a training squadron of Flugzeugführerschule "S" (FFS "S"—Pilot Training School) based at Memmingen Air Base. On 1 June 1958, Rammelt was succeeded by Oberstleutnant Wilhelm Batz In July 1965, Rammelt served in the Hubschrauber -Lehr, Versuchs- und Transportstaffel (HLVsuTrspStff—Helicopter Demonstration, Trial and Transport Squadron) at Fürstenfeldbruck Air Base. There he formulated his ideas for the creation of heavy helicopter transportation squadrons. Although preparations for the creation of Helicopter Transport Wing 64 were already in progress, Rammelt believed in decentralizing helicopter units, resulting in a less effective leadership of such units. Rammelt retired on 30 September 1969 holding the rank of Oberstleutnant. He died on 13 May 2009 at the age of 94 in Fürstenfeldbruck, Germany.

== Summary of career ==
=== Aerial victory claims ===
According to Obermaier, Rammelt was credited with 46 aerial victories victories claimed in 450 combat missions, among them many ground support missions. This figure includes 20 claims on the Eastern Front and 26 over the Western Allies, including 11 four-engine heavy bombers. Further 12 claims on the Eastern Front and two B-17 bombers on the Western Front were not confirmed. Aders and Held also list him with 46 aerial victories of which 27 were claimed over the Western Allies. Matthews and Foreman, authors of Luftwaffe Aces — Biographies and Victory Claims, researched the German Federal Archives and found records for 41 aerial victory claims, plus 16 further unconfirmed claims. Of his 41 confirmed aerial victories, 19 were claimed on the Eastern Front and 22 on the Western Front, including eight heavy bombers.

Victory claims were logged to a map-reference (PQ = Planquadrat), for example "PQ 04 Ost 90761". The Luftwaffe grid map (Jägermeldenetz) covered all of Europe, western Russia and North Africa and was composed of rectangles measuring 15 minutes of latitude by 30 minutes of longitude, an area of about 360 square miles (930 km^{2}). These sectors were then subdivided into 36 smaller units to give a location area 3 km × 4 km (1.9 mi × 2.5 mi) in size.

Chronicle of aerial victories
This and the ♠ (Ace of spades) indicates those aerial victories which made Rammelt an "ace-in-a-day", a term which designates a fighter pilot who has shot down five or more airplanes in a single day. This and the – (dash) indicates unconfirmed aerial victory claims for which Rammelt did not receive credit. This and the ? (question mark) indicates information discrepancies listed by Prien, Stemmer, Rodeike, Balke, Bock, Mathews and Foreman.
Claim	Date	Time	Type	Location	Claim	Date	Time	Type	Location
– 4. Staffel of Jagdgeschwader 51 "Mölders" – Eastern Front — 1 May – 4 October 1942
1	12 June 1942	17:45	Yak-1	20 km (12 mi) southwest of Bolkhov	—	8 August 1942	16:15	MiG-1	west of Chask
—	26 June 1942	10:40	Yak-1	east of Oryol	8	10 August 1942	17:05	Pe-2	10 km (6.2 mi) north of Rzhev
2♠	5 July 1942	05:00	Pe-2	20 km (12 mi) southwest of Belyov	9	13 August 1942	18:05	Yak-1	18 km (11 mi) southwest of Belyov
3♠	5 July 1942	05:05	Pe-2	10 km (6.2 mi) northwest of Belyov	—	21 August 1942	11:20	LaGG-3	10 km (6.2 mi) north of Belyov
4♠	5 July 1942	05:20	Il-2	15 km (9.3 mi) northeast of Bolkhov	10	23 August 1942	06:43	Il-2	10 km (6.2 mi) northeast of Uljanowo
—	5 July 1942	05:22? (Note: According to Mathews and Foreman claimed at 05:20.)	Il-2	15 km (9.3 mi) northeast of Bolkhov	—	23 August 1942	06:55	Il-2	northeast of Uljanowo
5♠	5 July 1942	09:30	Il-2	15 km (9.3 mi) northwest of Bolkhov	—	25 August 1942	06:35	Pe-2	west of Zhizdra
6♠	5 July 1942	14:06	Yak-1	10 km (6.2 mi) southeast of Bolkhov	11	27 August 1942	17:54? (Note: According to Mathews and Foreman claimed at 17:59.)	Il-2	28 km (17 mi) northeast of Oryol
7	6 July 1942	06:30	Il-2	30 km (19 mi) southeast of Zhizdra	12	28 August 1942	13:57? (Note: According to Mathews and Foreman claimed at 13:51.)	Il-2	5 km (3.1 mi) northwest of Belyov; 5 km (3.1 mi) southeast of Rzhev
— (Note: This unconfirmed claim is not listed by Mathews and Foreman.)	10 July 1942	17:05	Pe-2		—	4 September 1942	11:40	P-39	northwest of Zhizdra
—	4 August 1942	11:00	LaGG-3	northeast of Rzhev	13	8 September 1942	09:00	Pe-2	18 km (11 mi) northeast of Belyov
—	4 August 1942	12:05	LaGG-3	5 km (3.1 mi) north of Rzhev	14	14 September 1942	17:05? (Note: According to Mathews and Foreman claimed at 17:07.)	Pe-2	10 km (6.2 mi) southeast of Rzhev
—	5 August 1942	16:55	Il-2	15 km (9.3 mi) northeast of Rzhev	—	27 September 1942	07:45	MiG-3	30 km (19 mi) northwest of Rzhev
—	5 August 1942	17:15	Il-2	east of Dugino					
– 4. Staffel of Jagdgeschwader 51 "Mölders" – Mediterranean Theater, North Africa — 5 November – 31 December 1942
15	27 November 1942	09:18	Spitfire	12 km (7.5 mi) southwest of Béja	17	28 November 1942	15:42	Spitfire	33 km (21 mi) southwest of Bizerte
16	28 November 1942	15:35	Spitfire	30 km (19 mi) southwest of Bizerte; 35 km (22 mi) southeast of Gabès					
– 4. Staffel of Jagdgeschwader 51 "Mölders" – Mediterranean Theater, North Africa — 1 January – 11 April 1943
—	4 February 1942	14:30	B-17	southwest of Gabès	20	29 March 1943	18:45	P-40	10 km (6.2 mi) northeast of Skhira
18	20 March 1943	18:05	P-40	30 km (19 mi) northwest of Maknassy	21? (Note: This claim is not listed by Mathews and Foreman.)	31 March 1943	19:00	P-40	south of El Ayacha
19	21 March 1943	13:06	Spitfire	35 km (22 mi) southeast of Gabès	22	5 April 1943	14:48	P-40	10 km (6.2 mi) southwest of Hajeb El Ayoun
—	21 March 1943	16:30	B-17	30 km (19 mi) southwest of Gabès	—	6 April 1943	—	B-17	La Sebala Airfield
– 4. Staffel of Jagdgeschwader 51 "Mölders" – Mediterranean Theater, Sardinia and Sicily — May – July 1943
—	13 May 1943	14:05	B-17	30 km (19 mi) south of the southern edge of Sardinia	25	5 June 1943	15:16	P-38	PQ 04 Ost 90761
23	19 May 1943	13:33	Spitfire	PQ 04 Ost 8037; PQ 8637	26	18 June 1943	11:22	B-26	PQ 04 Ost 7087
24	31 May 1943	12:57	P-38	PQ 04 Ost 8044					
– Stab II. Gruppe of Jagdgeschwader 51 "Mölders" – Defense of the Reich — 15 August – 3 December 1943
27	14 October 1943	14:22	B-17	35 km (22 mi) north-northeast of Frankfurt	28	2 November 1943	13:35	B-17	80 km (50 mi) south-southwest of Wiener Neustadt northeast of Graz
– Stab II. Gruppe of Jagdgeschwader 51 "Mölders" – Mediterranean Theater, Northern Italy — December 1943
29	25 December 1943	11:20	P-38	Villa Estense	30	28 December 1943	11:52	B-24	40 km (25 mi) southwest of Padua
– Stab II. Gruppe of Jagdgeschwader 51 "Mölders" – Mediterranean Theater and in the Southeast — April – 31 August 1944
31	5 April 1944	14:18? (Note: According to Mathews and Foreman claimed at 14:13.)	B-24	100 km (62 mi) northeast of Craiova	34?	24 June 1944	08:42	B-24	PQ 24 Ost GJ-5, 40 km (25 mi) northwest of Sofia
32	15 April 1944	12:30	P-38	PQ 24 Ost AN-AO	— (Note: According to Mathews and Foreman this claim is listed as an Herausschuss (separation shot)—a severely damaged heavy bomber forced to separate from his combat box which was counted as an aerial victory.)	24 June 1944	11:08	B-24	Radomir
33	5 May 1944	15:30	P-38	PQ 24 Ost CB-3; Raška	35	15 July 1944	13:10	B-24	PQ 24 Ost CB-3, 40 km (25 mi) west of Niš; Stalati
– Stab II. Gruppe of Jagdgeschwader 51 "Mölders" – Southeast of the Eastern Front — 1 September – 23 December 1944
36	13 October 1944	16:01	Il-2	PQ 24 Ost GD-4, 20 km (12 mi) south of Debrecen	40	21 December 1944	11:35	Yak-9	PQ 14 Ost ES-3/3, 25 km (16 mi) northeast of Esztergom
37	6 December 1944	11:35	B-24	PQ 14 Ost EQ-4, 25 km (16 mi) north of Győr	41	21 December 1944	14:40	Il-2	PQ 14 Ost DW-6/1, 40 km (25 mi) northeast of Esztergom
38	8 December 1944	13:55	Boston	PQ 14 Ost ET-9/9, 40 km (25 mi) northeast of Budapest	— (Note: This unconfirmed claim is not listed by Prien, Stemmer, Balke and Bock.)	21 December 1944	—	B-24	
39	8 December 1944	14:10	La-5	PQ 14 Ost FT-3/4, 35 km (22 mi) northeast of Budapest					

=== Awards ===
- Iron Cross (1939) 2nd and 1st Class
- Honor Goblet of the Luftwaffe on 25 June 1943 as Oberleutnant and pilot
- German Cross in Gold on 16 January 1944 as Hauptmann in the II./Jagdgeschwader 51
- Knight's Cross of the Iron Cross on 20 October 1944 as Major and Gruppenkommandeur of the II./Jagdgeschwader 51 "Mölders" (Note: According to Scherzer on 24 October 1944.)

== Notes ==
Military offices
Preceded by Hauptmann Hartmann Grasser	Commander of II. Gruppe of Jagdgeschwader 51; 6 June 1943 – 24 December 1944	Succeeded by Oberleutnant Otto Schultz
