= Zlyn =

Zlyn Злынь
- Village
- Interactive map of Zlyn
- Location of Zlyn Zlyn (Russia)
- Coordinates: 53.272889°N 35.919083°E
- Country: Russia
- Federal subject: Oryol Oblast
- Administrative district: Bolkhovsky District
- Selsoviet: Zlyn

Population (2010 Census)
  - Total: 74
  - Estimate (2010): 74 (0%)
- Time zone: UTC+3 (MSK)
- Postal code: 303151
- OKTMO ID: 54604416111

Zlyn (Russian: Злынь) is a village in Bolkhovsky District, Oryol Oblast, Russia.
