= Joppien =

Joppien is a German surname. Notable people with the surname include:

- Björn Joppien (born 1981), German badminton player
- Hermann-Friedrich Joppien (1912–1941), German fighter pilot
