= Otto Schultz =

German World War II fighter pilot and officer in the German Air Force

- Born: 31 May 1920; Dannenberg, Germany
- Died: 28 July 2013 (aged 93)
- Military career
- Allegiance: Nazi Germany; West Germany
- Branch: Luftwaffe (Wehrmacht); German Air Force (Bundeswehr)
- Rank: Hauptmann (Wehrmacht); Oberstleutnant (Bundeswehr)
- Unit: Helicopter Transport Wing 64
- Commands: II./JG 51
- Conflicts: World War II: Battle of Britain; Eastern Front; Battle of the Mediterranean; Defence of the Reich
- Awards: Knight's Cross of the Iron Cross

Otto Schultz (31 May 1920 – 28 July 2013) was a German Luftwaffe ace and recipient of the Knight's Cross of the Iron Cross during World War II. Schultz was credited with 73 aerial victories claimed in approximately 820 combat missions.

== Early life and career ==
Schultz was born on 31 May 1920 in Dannenberg, at the time in the Province of Hanover within the Weimar Republic. Following flight training, (Note: Flight training in the Luftwaffe progressed through the levels A1, A2 and B1, B2, referred to as A/B flight training. A training included theoretical and practical training in aerobatics, navigation, long-distance flights and dead-stick landings. The B courses included high-altitude flights, instrument flights, night landings and training to handle the aircraft in difficult situations.) Schultz was posted to II. Gruppe (2nd group) of Jagdgeschwader 51 (JG 51—51st Fighter Wing) on 1 April 1940 where he initially served with 4. Staffel (4th squadron) of JG 51. At the time, 4. Staffel was headed by Oberleutnant Josef Fözö and the Gruppe was under command of Hauptmann Günther Matthes which was based at Böblingen Airfield.

== World War II ==
In June 1941, JG 51 and the majority of the Luftwaffe were transferred to the Eastern Front in preparation for Operation Barbarossa, the invasion of the Soviet Union.

II. Gruppe had been withdrawn from the Eastern Front in early October 1942 and sent to Jesau in East Prussia, present day Yushny, Bagrationovsky District, for conversion to the Focke-Wulf Fw 190. Conversion training began on 7 October and on 4 November, the unit received the order to convert back to the Bf 109 and to transfer to the Mediterranean theatre. Via various stopovers, II. Gruppe moved to Sidi Ahmed airfield, arriving on 14 November. There, the unit was subordinated to Fliegerführer Tunis (Flying Leader Tunis). There, Schultz claimed his first western aerial victory on 1 December, downing a Supermarine Spitfire. In December, the Gruppe was very successful over the new American pilots - claiming 50 victories while losing only two of their own. But as in Russia, in 1943, the superior numbers soon made their impact.

On 14 March 1943, Schultz was awarded the Knight's Cross of the Iron Cross (Ritterkreuz des Eisernen Kreuzes) for 51 aerial victories claimed. On 18 April, II. Gruppe received orders to exchange their newer Bf 109 G-4 and G-6 aircraft with older Bf 109 G-2 trop aircraft of Jagdgeschwader 77 (JG 77—77th Fighter Wing) and retreat from Africa to Bari, Italy. In August, orders transferred II./JG 51 to Munich to retrain as a specialist anti-bomber unit.

On 4 February 1944, Schultz was transferred and appointed Staffelkapitän (squadron leader) of 6. Staffel of JG 51. He succeeded Hauptmann Herbert Puschmann who was killed in action the day before.

With Romania's surrender to Soviet forces in late August, and its subsequent declaration of war against Germany, II./JG 51 retreated to Yugoslavia. Left as final air-cover for the army retreating out of Greece, 6./JG 51 reportedly engaged their former allies in Romanian-flown Bf 109s.

On 23 December 1944, Schultz was appointed Gruppenkommandeur (group commander) of II. Gruppe of JG 51. He succeeded Hauptmann Karl Rammelt who had been wounded in combat that day. Consequently, command of 6. Staffel was passed on to Leutnant Elias Kühlein.

== Later life ==
Following World War II, Schultz rejoined military service with the German Air Force, at the time referred to as the Bundesluftwaffe, retiring as an Oberstleutnant (lieutenant colonel) on 30 September 1976. From 1 October 1966 to 30 September 1971, Schultz served as deputy commander of Helicopter Transport Wing 64 based at Landsberg-Lech Air Base, formerly known as Penzing Air Base, which was under command of Oberst Johannes Naumann. Schultz died on 28 July 2013 at the age of 93 in Fürstenfeldbruck, Germany.

== Summary of career ==
=== Aerial victory claims ===
According to US historian David T. Zabecki, Schultz was credited with 73 aerial victories. Spick also list him with 73 aerial victories claimed in over 800 combat missions. Matthews and Foreman, authors of Luftwaffe Aces — Biographies and Victory Claims, researched the German Federal Archives and found records for 72 aerial victory claims, 39 were claimed on the Eastern Front and 33 on the Western Front, including seven heavy bombers.

Victory claims were logged to a map-reference (PQ = Planquadrat), for example "PQ 47814". The Luftwaffe grid map (Jägermeldenetz) covered all of Europe, western Russia and North Africa and was composed of rectangles measuring 15 minutes of latitude by 30 minutes of longitude, an area of about 360 square miles (930 km^{2}). These sectors were then subdivided into 36 smaller units to give a location area 3 km × 4 km (1.9 mi × 2.5 mi) in size.

Chronicle of aerial victories
This and the – (dash) indicates unwitnessed aerial victory claims for which Schultz did not receive credit. This along with the & (ampersand) indicates a endgültige Vernichtung (final destruction)—a coup de grâce inflicted on an already damaged heavy bomber. This and the ? (question mark) indicates information discrepancies listed by Prien, Stemmer, Rodeike, Balke, Bock, Mathews and Foreman.
Claim	Date	Time	Type	Location	Claim	Date	Time	Type	Location
– 4. Staffel of Jagdgeschwader 51 – Operation Barbarossa — 22 June – 5 December 1941
1	22 June 1941	09:32	SB-2		10	26 July 1941	18:45	Pe-2	
2	22 June 1941	09:40	SB-2		11	26 July 1941	18:50	Pe-2	
3	29 June 1941	17:50	I-18 (MiG-1)		12	9 August 1941	13:50	Pe-2	
4	30 June 1941	17:30	DB-3		13	16 August 1941	15:42	I-18 (MiG-1)	
5	30 June 1941	17:40	DB-3		14	25 August 1941	07:55	DB-3	south of Gomel
6	8 July 1941	19:20	SB-2	south of Walki	15	24 September 1941	10:50	R-3? (Note: According to Mathews and Foreman claimed as a Mikoyan-Gurevich MiG-3.)	
7	10 July 1941	09:50	I-16		16	27 October 1941	15:40	I-61 (MiG-3)	
8	11 July 1941	16:25	DB-3		17	29 October 1941	07:20	I-16? (Note: According to Mathews and Foreman claimed as a Ilyushin Il-2.)	25 km (16 mi) northeast of Oryol
9	13 July 1941	10:07	DB-3		18	29 October 1941	12:40	I-16?	
– 4. Staffel of Jagdgeschwader 51 "Mölders" – Eastern Front — 1 May – 4 October 1942
19	8 June 1942	03:50	I-180 (Yak-7)		28	9 August 1942	11:05	LaGG-3	PQ 47814 vicinity of Zubtsov
20	24 June 1942	15:20	Pe-2		29	22 August 1942	14:50	Il-2	PQ 54283; 15 km (9.3 mi) south of Kozelsk
21	2 July 1942	18:07	Pe-2	25 km (16 mi) north-northwest of Olenino	30	22 August 1942	14:52? (Note: According to Mathews and Foreman claimed at 14:53.)	Il-2	PQ 54253; 25 km (16 mi) south of Kozelsk
22	6 July 1942	19:35	Yak-1	15 km (9.3 mi) northeast of Zhizdra	31	23 August 1942	07:00	Il-2	PQ 54283; 25 km (16 mi) south of Kozelsk
23	9 July 1942	14:55	Yak-1		32	25 August 1942	08:25	LaGG-3	PQ 54261; 15 km (9.3 mi) northwest of Belyov
24	17 July 1942	06:10	LaGG-3	3 km (1.9 mi) south of Russinitschi	33	25 August 1942	14:25	Pe-2	PQ 54283; 25 km (16 mi) south of Kozelsk
25	3 August 1942	04:53	LaGG-3	PQ 47524; 20 km (12 mi) north-northwest of Rzhev	34	27 August 1942	17:45	MiG-3	PQ 64774; 10 km (6.2 mi) west of Zalegoshch
26	4 August 1942	10:48	Il-2	PQ 47823; 10 km (6.2 mi) east of Zubtsov	35	27 August 1942	17:48	MiG-3	PQ 64772; 10 km (6.2 mi) north of Oryol
27	6 August 1942	18:57	Il-2	PQ 56373 vicinity of Gagarin	36	27 August 1942	17:58	Il-2	PQ 63131; 10 km (6.2 mi) north of Oryol
– 4. Staffel of Jagdgeschwader 51 "Mölders" – Mediterranean Theater, North Africa — 5 November – 31 December 1942
37	1 December 1942	10:45	Spitfire	15 km (9.3 mi) southwest of Mateur	40	4 December 1942	15:47	Spitfire	18 km (11 mi) southwest of Mateur
38	3 December 1942	10:18	P-38	1 km (0.62 mi) south of Tunis	41	28 December 1942	15:33? (Note: According to Mathews and Foreman claimed at 15:35.)	P-38	1 km (0.62 mi) south of Pont du Fahs
39	4 December 1942	15:40	Spitfire	15 km (9.3 mi) southwest of Mateur					
– 4. Staffel of Jagdgeschwader 51 "Mölders" – Mediterranean Theater, North Africa — 1 January – 11 April 1943
42	2 January 1943	12:27	P-38	5 km (3.1 mi) southwest of Pont du Fahs	49	30 January 1943	10:30	P-38	10 km (6.2 mi) west of El Hamma
43	10 January 1943	07:30	Spitfire	northwest of Fériana	50	30 January 1943	10:45	P-38	2 km (1.2 mi) west of El Hamma
44	10 January 1943	11:00	B-26	10 km (6.2 mi) west of Gabès	51	2 February 1943	17:30	P-40	PQ 03 Ost 95311
45	11 January 1943	16:00	P-38	20 km (12 mi) west of Gabès	52	8 February 1943	12:52	B-25	50 km (31 mi) northwest of Gabès
46	15 January 1943	13:25	P-38	5 km (3.1 mi) west of Gabès	53	26 February 1943	15:05	B-17	50 km (31 mi) west of Cagliari
47	22 January 1943	12:20	P-38	15 km (9.3 mi) west of Gabès	54	21 March 1943	14:20	Spitfire	35 km (22 mi) east-southeast of Gabès
48	23 January 1943	09:35	P-38	40 km (25 mi) northeast of Kebili					
– 4. Staffel of Jagdgeschwader 51 "Mölders" – Mediterranean Theater, Sardinia and Sicily — May – July 1943
55	31 May 1943	13:05	P-38	PQ 03 Ost 70632	56	24 June 1943	09:15	P-40	PQ 03 Ost 98214
– 5. Staffel of Jagdgeschwader 51 "Mölders" – Mediterranean Theater, Northern Italy — December 1943
57	25 December 1943	11:24	P-38	south of Rovigo	59	28 December 1943	11:55	B-24	5 km (3.1 mi) south of Montagnana
58	25 December 1943	11:24	P-38	south of Rovigo					
– 5. Staffel of Jagdgeschwader 51 "Mölders" – Mediterranean Theater and in the Southeast — 1 January – 3 February 1944
60	16 January 1944	12:40	Boston	PQ 14 Ost KD-6, 10 km (6.2 mi) northeast of Civitavecchia	62	22 January 1944	16:05	P-38	PQ 14 Ost KE-6, 30 km (19 mi) south-southwest of Rome
61	22 January 1944	15:50	P-47	PQ 14 Ost JF-2, 3 km (1.9 mi) east-northeast of Guidonia					
– 6. Staffel of Jagdgeschwader 51 "Mölders" – Mediterranean Theater and in the Southeast — 4 February – 31 August 1944
63	5 April 1944	14:18	B-24	80 km (50 mi) west-southwest of Ploiești	67? (Note: This claim is not listed by Mathews and Foreman.)	11 June 1944	—	P-51	50 km (31 mi) east of Dupnitsa
64	16 April 1944	11:30	B-24	PQ 24 Ost RK-2, 15 km (9.3 mi) northwest of Pitești	68	11 June 1944	11:45	B-24	PQ 24 Ost GF-7/6
65?	21 April 1944	11:50	B-24	55 km (34 mi) northwest of Craiova	— (Note: According to Mathews and Foreman, this claim was confirmed.)	24 June 1944	08:55	B-24&	PQ 24 Ost GF-9; Radomir
66	6 June 1944	10:45	B-24	PQ 24 Ost UD 2/6, 20 km (12 mi) north of Vidin; Žagubica					
– Stab II. Gruppe of Jagdgeschwader 51 "Mölders" – Southeast of the Eastern Front — 23 December 1944 – 12 April 1945
69	22 December 1944	14:30	La-5	PQ 14 Ost N/ES-6/3	72	4 January 1945	—	Il-2	
70	3 January 1945	—	La-5		73	2 February 1945	—	Boston	
71	3 January 1945	—	Il-2						

=== Awards ===
- Iron Cross (1939) 2nd and 1st Class
- Ehrenpokal der Luftwaffe (3 November 1941)
- German Cross in Gold on 24 September 1942 as Oberfeldwebel in the II./Jagdgeschwader 51
- Knight's Cross of the Iron Cross on 14 March 1943 as Oberfeldwebel and pilot in the 4./Jagdgeschwader 51

== Notes ==
Military offices
Preceded by Hauptmann Herbert Puschmann	Staffelkapitän of 6. Staffel of Jagdgeschwader 51 "Mölders"; 4 February 1944 – 23 December 1944	Succeeded by Leutnant Elias Kühlein
Preceded by Major Karl Rammelt	Gruppenkommandeur of II. Gruppe of Jagdgeschwader 51 "Mölders"; 24 December 1944 – 12 April 1945	Succeeded by None, unit disbanded
