= Wolfgang Böwing-Treuding =

German fighter pilot during World War II (1922–1943)

- Born: 28 January 1922; Hamburg
- Died: 11 February 1943 (aged 21) near Velikiye Luki
- Cause of death: Killed in action
- Military career
- Allegiance: Nazi Germany
- Branch: Luftwaffe
- Service years: ?–1943
- Rank: Oberleutnant (first lieutenant)
- Unit: JG 51
- Commands: 10./JG 51
- Conflicts: World War II: Eastern Front
- Awards: Knight's Cross of the Iron Cross

Wolfgang Böwing-Treuding (28 January 1922 – 11 February 1943) was a German Luftwaffe fighter pilot and recipient of the Knight's Cross of the Iron Cross during World War II. Böwing-Treuding was credited by Nazi propaganda with 46 aerial victories, all over the Eastern Front. He was killed by the Red Army ground-fire on 11 February 1943 and was posthumously awarded the Knight's Cross on 24 March 1943.

== Career ==
Böwing-Treuding was born on 28 January 1922 in Hamburg, at the time a sovereign state of the Weimar Republic. Following flight training, (Note: Flight training in the Luftwaffe progressed through the levels A1, A2 and B1, B2, referred to as A/B flight training. A training included theoretical and practical training in aerobatics, navigation, long-distance flights and dead-stick landings. The B courses included high-altitude flights, instrument flights, night landings and training to handle the aircraft in difficult situations.) Böwing-Treuding was posted to 8. Staffel (8th squadron) of Jagdgeschwader 51 (JG 51—51st Fighter Wing), a squadron of III. Gruppe (3rd group) of JG 51.

On 10 August 1942, Böwing-Treuding was temporarily appointed Staffelkapitän (squadron leader) of 11. Staffel of Jagdgeschwader 51 (JG 51—51st Fighter Wing). He replaced Oberleutnant Georg Seelmann who had been wounded in combat on 3 August. Böwing-Treuding held this position until 20 August when Oberleutnant Adolf Borchers was given official command of the Staffel. On 17 December, Böwing-Treuding was given command of 10. Staffel after its former commander, Leutnant Rolf Kickert, was killed in action.

On 11 February 1943, Böwing-Treuding was killed in action when his Focke-Wulf Fw 190 A-4 (Werknummer 5777—factory number) was hit and shot down by anti-aircraft artillery in a location 10 kilometers (6.2 miles) northwest of Velikiye Luki. In consequence, command of 10. Staffel was passed to Oberleutnant Horst-Günther von Fassong. Posthumously, Böwing-Treuding was awarded the Knight's Cross of the Iron Cross (Ritterkreuz des Eisernen Kreuzes) on 24 March 1943 for 46 aerial victories claimed.

== Summary of career ==
=== Aerial victory claims ===
According to Obermaier, Böwing-Treuding was credited with 46 aerial victories. Mathews and Foreman, authors of Luftwaffe Aces — Biographies and Victory Claims, researched the German Federal Archives and found records for 46 aerial victory claims, all of which claimed on the Eastern Front.

Victory claims were logged to a map-reference (PQ = Planquadrat), for example "PQ 47872". The Luftwaffe grid map (Jägermeldenetz) covered all of Europe, western Russia and North Africa and was composed of rectangles measuring 15 minutes of latitude by 30 minutes of longitude, an area of about 360 square miles (930 km^{2}). These sectors were then subdivided into 36 smaller units to give a location area 3 km × 4 km (1.9 mi × 2.5 mi) in size.

Chronicle of aerial victories
| Claim | Date | Time | Type | Location | Claim | Date | Time | Type | Location |
– 8. Staffel of Jagdgeschwader 51 – Operation Barbarossa — July 1941
| 1 | 13 July 1941 | 09:55 | DB-3 | | 2 | 29 July 1941 | 04:20 | SB-3 | |
– 12. Staffel of Jagdgeschwader 51 – Operation Barbarossa — August – 5 December 1941
| 3 | 28 August 1941 | 13:00 | SB-2 | | 7 | 4 November 1941 | 08:55 | DB-3 | |
| 4 | 15 October 1941 | 07:21 | I-61 | | 8 | 5 November 1941 | 09:15 | I-16 | |
| 5 | 23 October 1941 | 14:25 | I-61 | | 9 | 4 December 1941 | 07:55 | LaGG-3 | |
| 6 | 24 October 1941 | 13:19 | I-18 | | | | | | |
– 12. Staffel of Jagdgeschwader 51 "Mölders" – Eastern Front — 6 December 1941 – 30 April 1942
| 10 | 17 December1941 | 13:30 | I-61 | | 14 | 21 March 1942 | 15:55 | Pe-2 | |
| 11 | 30 December1941 | 14:57 | Pe-2 | | 15 | 28 March 1942 | 13:40 | Pe-2 | |
| 12 | 8 January 1942 | 10:35 | R-10 | | 16 | 5 April 1942 | 12:21 | Pe-2 | |
| 13 | 18 January 1942 | 14:22 | R-5 | | 17 | 17 April 1942 | 08:54 | Pe-2 | |
– Stab IV. Gruppe of Jagdgeschwader 51 "Mölders" – Eastern Front — 1 May – 13 August 1942
| 18 | 5 June 1942 | 18:21 | Il-2 | | 23 | 5 August 1942 | 10:22 | Il-2 | PQ 47872; 15 km (9.3 mi) south of Zubtsov |
| 19 | 6 July 1942 | 19:35 | I-16 | | 24 | 6 August 1942 | 18:54 | Il-2 | PQ 56381 |
| 20 | 1 August 1942 | 12:34 | Il-2 | PQ 46212; 20 km (12 mi) north-northeast of Konaja | 25 | 9 August 1942 | 08:15 | MiG-3 | PQ 56144 |
| 21 | 2 August 1942 | 14:58 | Pe-2 | PQ 47564; 15 km (9.3 mi) north of Rzhev | 26 | 13 August 1942 | 18:52 | Il-2 | PQ 56182 |
| 22 | 2 August 1942 | 17:35 | Pe-2 | PQ 47561; 15 km (9.3 mi) north of Rzhev | | | | | |
– 11. Staffel of Jagdgeschwader 51 "Mölders" – Eastern Front — 13 August – 16 December 1942
| 27 | 23 August 1942 | 14:42 | Il-2 | PQ 47594 | 32 | 10 September 1942 | 14:14 | Pe-2 | PQ 56541 |
| 28 | 2 September 1942 | 07:15 | Il-2 | northwest of Rzhev | 33 | 13 September 1942 | 17:24 | Il-2 | PQ 45513 |
| 29 | 5 September 1942 | 11:21 | Il-2 | north-northwest of Rzhev | 34 | 30 October 1942 | 09:25 | Il-2 | Puschyanik |
| 30 | 7 September 1942 | 16:56 | Pe-2 | west of Rzhev | 35 | 30 October 1942 | 09:27 | Il-2 | Kurino |
| 31 | 10 September 1942 | 07:08 | Pe-2 | PQ 47843 | 36 | 30 October 1942 | 10:45 | Il-2 | Schogussowo |
– 10. Staffel of Jagdgeschwader 51 "Mölders" – Eastern Front — 17 December 1942 – 11 February 1943
| 37 | 17 December 1942 | 10:55 | MiG-3 | 2 km (1.2 mi) east of Ischewosew | 42 | 6 January 1943 | 10:41 | Pe-2 | PQ 07583 |
| 38 | 17 December 1942 | 10:59 | Il-2 | 1 km (0.62 mi) east of Petruschino | 43 | 6 January 1943 | 10:58 | Pe-2 | PQ 07594 |
| 39 | 29 December 1942 | 09:50 | Il-2 | PQ 07593 | 44 | 7 January 1943 | 12:09 | Pe-2 | PQ 07593 |
| 40 | 6 January 1943 | 08:50 | Il-2 | PQ 07593 | 45 | 26 January 1943 | 13:55 | Pe-2 | PQ 07892 |
| 41 | 6 January 1943 | 10:40 | Pe-2 | PQ 07714 | 46 | 3 February 1943 | 14:01 | Pe-2 | PQ 25462; 20 km (12 mi) west-northwest of Yelnya |

=== Awards ===
- Iron Cross (1939) 2nd and 1st Class
- Honor Goblet of the Luftwaffe (13 September 1942)
- German Cross in Gold on 15 October 1942 as Leutnant in the II./Jagdgeschwader 51
- Knight's Cross of the Iron Cross on 24 March 1943 as Oberleutnant and as Staffelführer of the 10./Jagdgeschwader 51 "Mölders". (Note: According to Scherzer as Staffelkapitän of the 10./Jagdgeschwader 51 "Mölders".)
