= Vishnevsky (rural locality) =

Vishnevsky (Russian: Вишневский; masculine), Vishnevskaya (Вишневская; feminine), or Vishnevskoye (Вишневское; neuter) is the name of two rural localities in Russia:

- Vishnevsky, Oryol Oblast, a settlement in Bolkhovsky District of Oryol Oblast
- Vishnevsky, Bryansk Oblast, a settlement in Starodubsky District of Bryansk Oblast; abolished in 2010
