= Novoduginsky District =

Novoduginsky District Новодугинский район (Russian)
- District
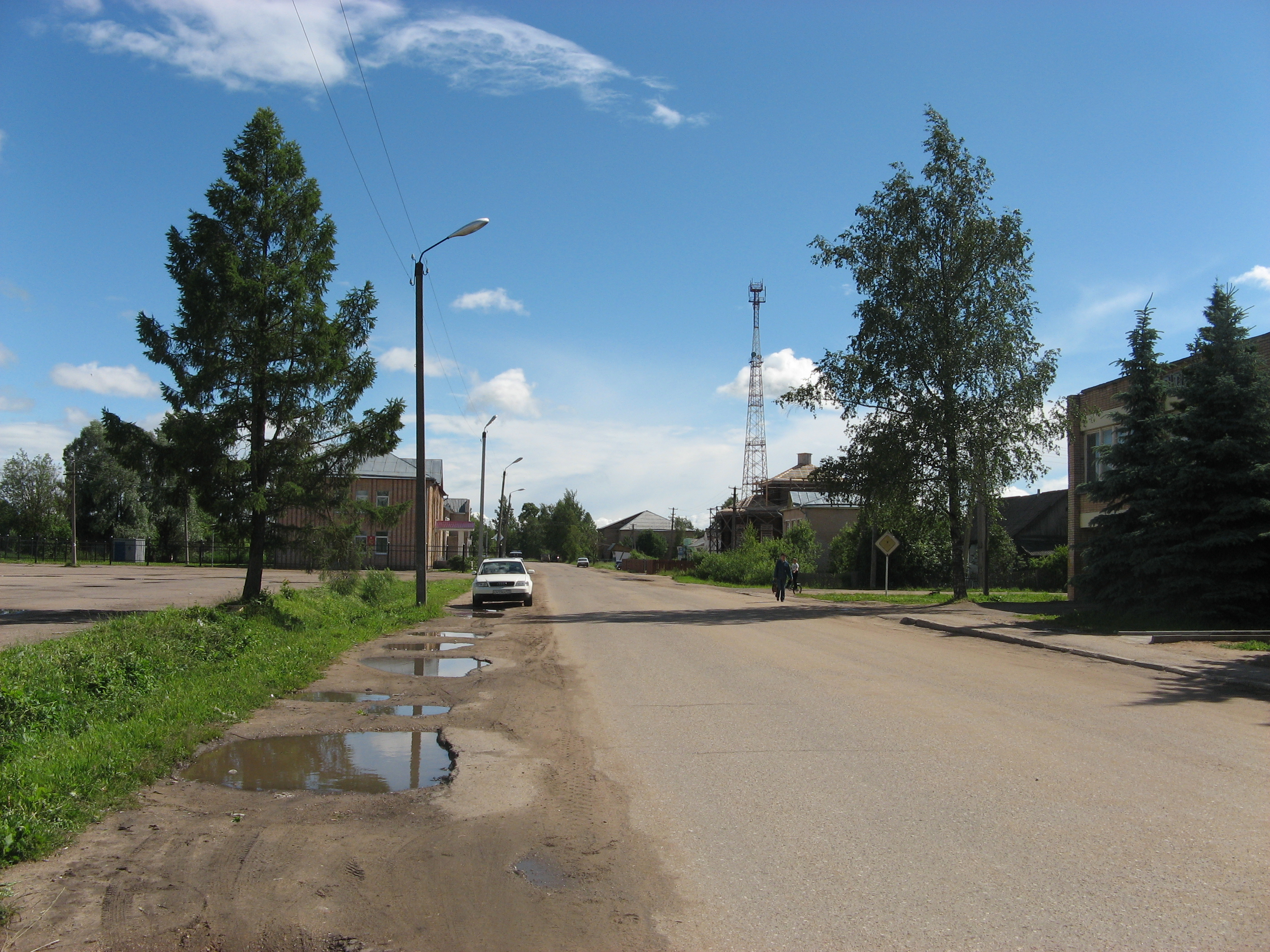
- A street in the selo of Novodugino, the administrative center of the district

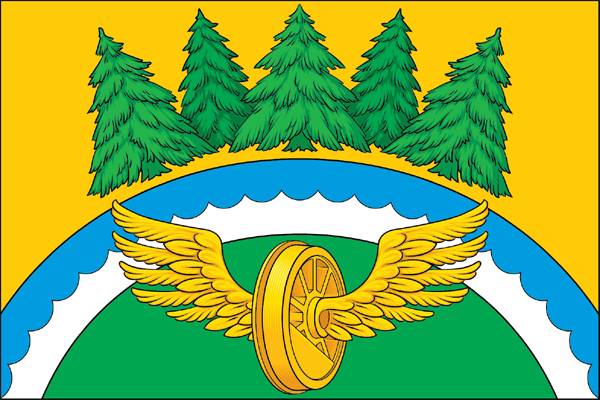
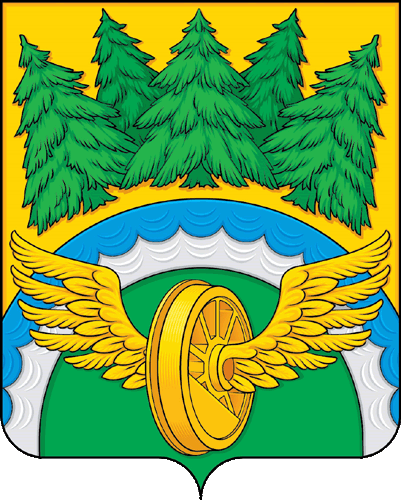
- Flag Coat of arms
- Location of Novoduginsky District in Smolensk Oblast
- Coordinates: 55°38′N 34°18′E
- Country: Russia
- Federal subject: Smolensk Oblast
- Established: 1929
- Administrative center: Novodugino

Area
  - Total: 1,922.04 km^{2} (742.10 sq mi)

Population (2010 Census)
  - Total: 10,477
  - Density: 5.4510/km^{2} (14.118/sq mi)
  - Urban: 0%
  - Rural: 100%

Administrative structure
  - Administrative divisions: 6 Rural settlements
  - Inhabited localities: 218 rural localities

Municipal structure
  - Municipally incorporated as: Novoduginsky Municipal District
  - Municipal divisions: 0 urban settlements, 5 rural settlements
- Time zone: UTC+3 (MSK)
- OKTMO ID: 66630000
- Website: http://novodugino.admin-smolensk.ru

Novoduginsky District (Russian: Новодугинский райо́н) is an administrative and municipal district (raion), one of the twenty-five in Smolensk Oblast, Russia. It is located in the northeast of the oblast. The area of the district is 1,922.04 square kilometers (742.10 sq mi). Its administrative center is the rural locality (a selo) of Novodugino. Population: 10,477 (2010 Census); 11,860 (2002 census); 14,240 (1989 Soviet census). The population of Novodugino accounts for 36.6% of the district's total population.
