= Hermann-Friedrich Joppien =

German World War II flying ace

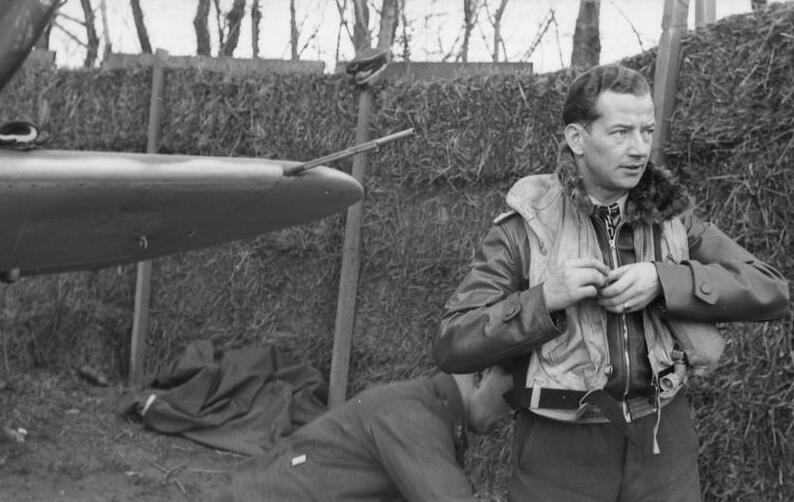
- Joppien in France, 1940
- Born: 19 July 1912; Bochum
- Died: 25 August 1941 (aged 29) near Yelnya, southwest of Bryansk
- Cause of death: Killed in action
- Military career
- Allegiance: Weimar Republic (to 1933); Nazi Germany
- Branch: Reichsheer (1931–35); Luftwaffe (1935–41)
- Service years: 1931–1941
- Rank: Hauptmann (Captain)
- Unit: JG 51
- Commands: 1./JG 51, I./JG 51
- Conflicts: See battles World War II: Phoney War; Battle of France; Battle of Britain; Operation Barbarossa
- Awards: Knight's Cross of the Iron Cross with Oak Leaves

Hermann-Friedrich Joppien (19 July 1912 – 25 August 1941) was a German Luftwaffe military aviator during World War II, a fighter ace who claimed 70 enemy aircraft shot down in roughly 270 combat missions. He claimed 42 victories over the Western Front, of which 23 were Supermarine Spitfires, the remaining victories were recorded over the Eastern Front.

Born in Bochum, Joppien volunteered for military service, at first with the Reichswehr of the Weimar Republic and later with the Luftwaffe of Nazi Germany. He was posted to Jagdgeschwader 51 (JG 51—51st Fighter Wing) in 1939 and fought in the Battle of France and Britain on the Western Front. In October 1940 he was given command of I. Gruppe (1st group) of JG 51. On account of his 40th aerial victory claimed, he was awarded Knight's Cross of the Iron Cross with Oak Leaves. It was Germany's highest military decoration at the time of its presentation to Joppien. (Note: Until late September 1941, the Knight's Cross of the Iron Cross with Oak Leaves was second only to the Grand Cross of the Iron Cross (Großkreuz des Eisernen Kreuzes), which was awarded only to senior commanders for winning a major battle or campaign, in the military order of Nazi Germany. The Knight's Cross of the Iron Cross with Oak Leaves as highest military order was surpassed on 28 September 1941 by the Knight's Cross of the Iron Cross with Oak Leaves and Swords (Ritterkreuz des Eisernen Kreuzes mit Eichenlaub und Schwertern).) Fighting on the Eastern Front, he was killed in action with Soviet fighters on 25 August 1941.

== Early life and career ==
Joppien was born on 19 July 1912 in Bochum in the Province of Westphalia, a province of the Kingdom of Prussia. His father was a laborer and when he found new work in 1917, the family moved to Hersfeld. After Joppien completed his schooling, he received a vocational education and learned the trade of a typesetter in a printing firm. In October 1931, Joppien joined the military service with Infanterie-Regiment 15 (15th Infantry Regiment) of the Reichswehr of the Weimar Republic in Gießen. There he was promoted to Unteroffizier (corporal) in 1933.

In parallel to his military service at Gießen, Joppien was very much interested and involved in glider construction and glider flight. His transfer to the Luftwaffe was somewhat delayed as Joppien had been tasked with the training of new officer recruits. On 15 October 1935, his transfer to the Luftwaffe was finally authorized. Until Christmas 1935, he had logged 100 solo flights and in June 1936 he became a flight instructor. He was promoted to Unterfeldwebel (junior non-commissioned officer) on 1 October 1936, to Feldwebel (non-commissioned officer) on 1 February 1937, and to Oberfeldwebel (staff sergeant) on 1 July 1937.

He was then selected for officer training and posted to a Kriegsschule (war school). Graduating among the top of his class of 130 students, he was promoted to Leutnant (second lieutenant) on 23 December 1938. Initially serving as a pilot and Staffeloffizier (squadron officer) in Jagdgeschwader 2 "Richthofen" (JG 2—2nd Fighter Wing), (Note: For an explanation of Luftwaffe unit designations see Organization of the Luftwaffe during World War II.) named after the after World War I fighter ace Manfred von Richthofen, he was promoted to Oberleutnant (first lieutenant) on 1 June 1939. He then held the position of Technischer Offizier (technical officer) with Stab of Jagdgruppe 176 (176th Fighter Group), which was formed from the II. Gruppe (2nd Group) of Zerstörergeschwader 76 (ZG 76—76th Destroyer Wing). In mid 1939, Joppien was posted to the 1. Staffel (1st Squadron) of Jagdgeschwader 51 (JG 51—51st Fighter Wing).

== World War II ==
World War II in Europe began on Friday, 1 September 1939, when German forces invaded Poland. On 23 November 1939, on the Western Front, Joppien claimed his first victory, an Armée de l'Air (French Air Force) Morane-Saulnier M.S.406 of GC III/7, piloted by Sergent (Sergeant) Guillaume who crash landed at Heillecourt where the aircraft completely burned out. During the encounter, his Messerschmitt Bf 109 was damaged by enemy fire resulting in undercarriage failure on landing. His aircraft overturned, fortunately for Joppien, he escaped unhurt. For this achievement, he was awarded the Iron Cross 2nd Class (Eisernes Kreuz 2. Klasse) on 13 December 1939.

=== Battle of France and Britain ===
The Battle of France, the German invasion of France and the Low Countries, began on 10 May 1940. During this campaign, Joppien was awarded the Iron Cross 1st Class (Eisernes Kreuz 1. Klasse) on 10 June 1940. By 25 June 1940, the date which marked the end of the French campaign, he claimed three further victories, which brought his total to four aerial victories. On 10 June, I. Gruppe was ordered to Jever Airfield and to Leeuwarden Airfield on 21 June. The Gruppe was then ordered to Saint-Inglevert Airfield on 12 July and participated in the Battle of Britain against the Royal Air Force (RAF).

On 5 August 1940, Joppien became Staffelkapitän (squadron leader) of the 1. Staffel of JG 51. He succeeded Hauptmann Douglas Pitcairn who was injured in a takeoff accident that day. He claimed his first aerial victory as a Staffelkapitän on 11 August. That day, the Gruppe encountered RAF Supermarine Spitfire fighters off of Dover. During these battles, after 21 aerial victories claimed, he was awarded the Knight's Cross of the Iron Cross (Ritterkreuz des Eisernen Kreuzes) on 16 September 1940. Two days later, he was promoted to Hauptmann (captain). On 18 October, Joppien was appointed Gruppenkommandeur (group commander) of I. Gruppe of JG 51. He succeeded Oberleutnant Richard Leppla who had temporarily led the Gruppe after its former commander, Hauptmann Hans-Heinrich Brustellin had taken been transferred.

He accumulated further victories against the RAF and on account of his 40th victory achieved on 21 April 1941 was honorably mentioned in the Wehrmachtbericht propaganda radio report, the first of three such mentions, on 22 April. The next day, he was the 11th officer or soldier of the Wehrmacht honored with the Knight's Cross of the Iron Cross with Oak Leaves (Ritterkreuz des Eisernen Kreuzes mit Eichenlaub) which was presented to him by Adolf Hitler. He claimed his last two aerial victories on the Western Front on 8 May. The claims were over Hawker Hurricane Mk IIs from No. 302 Polish Fighter Squadron piloted by Piotr Łaguna and Marian Domagała, both pilots bailed out.

The Gruppe was withdrawn from operations at the English Channel on 25 May 1941 and relocated to Krefeld Airfield for a short period of maintenance and overhaul.

=== Operation Barbarossa and death ===
In June 1941, JG 51 and the majority of the Luftwaffe were transferred to the Eastern Front in preparation for Operation Barbarossa, the invasion of the Soviet Union on 22 June 1941. There, on 30 June 1941, he shot down five Soviet bombers near Bobruysk in eastern Belarus, his aerial victories 47–51. This "ace-in-a-day" achievement earned him his second mention in the Wehrmachtbericht on 1 July 1941. On 5 July 1941, he was wounded following his 58th victory claimed and spent several weeks in convalescence.

On 25 August 1941, Joppien and his wingman, Leutnant Erwin Fleig, engaged in combat with Soviet fighters and bombers near Yelnya, Bryansk Oblast, a village in Krasnovichsky Selsoviet of Unechsky District of Bryansk Oblast, 20 kilometers (12 miles) southwest of Bryansk. In the subsequent action Joppien was shot down and killed in his Bf 109 F-2 (Werknummer 9670—factory number) "Black" by a Soviet Polikarpov I-16 fighter. That day, 190 ShAP (Shturmovoy Aviatsionnyy Polk—Ground-attack Aviation Regiment) and 57 BAP (Bombardirovochnyy Aviatsionyy Polk—bomber aviation regiment) attacked targets near Yelnya. Fleig later gave to protocol that he and Joppien had attacked three Petlyakov Pe-2 bombers, escorted by three I-16 fighter aircraft, at an altitude of 600–700 meters (2,000–2,300 feet). Fleig saw that Joppien had attacked a Pe-2 bomber, which trailing smoke, was going down. Fleig then observed Joppien's Bf 109 making a sharp right turn and crashed into the ground. By this date, Joppien had shot down 70 enemy aircraft claimed in roughly 270 combat missions. The Wehrmachtbericht announced his death on 29 August 1941. Following his death, command of I. Gruppe went to Hauptmann Wilhelm Hachfeld who had previously commanded 2. Staffel.

== Summary of career ==
=== Aerial victory claims ===
According to US historian David T. Zabecki, Joppien was credited with 70 aerial victories. Mathews and Foreman, authors of Luftwaffe Aces — Biographies and Victory Claims, researched the German Federal Archives and found records for 59 confirmed aerial victory claims, plus eleven further unconfirmed claims. This figure of confirmed claims includes 32 aerial victories on the Western Front and 27 on the Eastern Front.

Chronicle of aerial victories
This and the ♠ (Ace of spades) indicates those aerial victories which made Joppien an "ace-in-a-day", a term which designates a fighter pilot who has shot down five or more airplanes in a single day. This and the – (dash) indicates unconfirmed aerial victory claims for which Joppien did not receive credit. This and the ? (question mark) indicates information discrepancies listed by Prien, Stemmer, Rodeike, Bock, Mathews and Foreman.
Claim	Date	Time	Type	Location	Claim	Date	Time	Type	Location
– 1. Staffel of Jagdgeschwader 51 – "Phoney War" — 1 September 1939 – 9 May 1940
1	23 November 1939	15:30	M.S.406	Zweibrücken					
– 1. Staffel of Jagdgeschwader 51 – Battle of France — 10 May – 25 June 1940
2	23 May 1940	16:28	D.520	Béthune	4	6 June 1940	17:12	LeO 451	Ham
3	5 June 1940	14:42	MB.152? (Note: According to Mathews and Foreman claimed as a Bristol Blenheim.)	Bréteuil					
– 1. Staffel of Jagdgeschwader 51 – At the Channel and over England — 26 June 1940 – 21 June 1941
5	29 July 1940	08:25	Spitfire	Dover	12	31 August 1940	14:16	Spitfire	
6	29 July 1940	08:28	Spitfire	Dover	—	6 September 1940	—	Spitfire	
—	29 July 1940	—	Spitfire	Dover	—	9 September 1940	—	Hurricane	
7	11 August 1940	15:13	Spitfire		—	9 September 1940	—	Hurricane	
8	15 August 1940	16:05	Hurricane		13	11 September 1940	16:50	Spitfire	
—	15 August 1940	—	Hurricane		14	11 September 1940	17:10	Spitfire? (Note: According to Mathews and Foreman claimed as a Hawker Hurricane.)	
9	24 August 1940	14:09	Spitfire		15	15 September 1940	12:40	Spitfire	
10	29 August 1940	20:09? (Note: According to Mathews and Foreman claimed at 20:08.)	Spitfire		—	15 September 1940	—	Spitfire	
11	31 August 1940	14:10	Spitfire		—	27 September 1940	—	Hurricane	
– Stab I. Gruppe of Jagdgeschwader 51 – At the Channel and over England — 26 June 1940 – 21 June 1941
—	29 October 1940	—	Hurricane		23	3 March 1941	17:02	Spitfire	south of Ashford
16	8 November 1940	12:20	Hurricane		24	3 March 1941	17:13	Spitfire	Folkestone
—	11 November 1940	—	Spitfire		25	12 March 1941	19:27	Spitfire	Dungeness
—	11 November 1940	—	Spitfire		26	18 March 1941	12:28	Hurricane	Lewes; 5 km (3.1 mi) south of Lewes
17	14 November 1940	12:25	Spitfire	Dungeness? (Note: According to Mathews and Foreman claimed at Kenley.)	27	15 April 1941	12:33? (Note: According to Mathews and Foreman claimed at 12:30.)	Spitfire	5 km (3.1 mi) southeast of Dungeness
18	1 December 1940	11:40	Spitfire	vicinity of Hollingbourne	28	16 April 1941	18:30	Hurricane	4 km (2.5 mi) southwest of Dungeness
19	1 December 1940	15:16	Hurricane	Ashford vicinity of Hollingbourne	29	20 April 1941	12:12	Spitfire	20 km (12 mi) north of Cap Gris-Nez
20	5 December 1940	15:47	Spitfire	north of Rye	30	21 April 1941	20:10	Hurricane	northwest of Ashford
21	26 February 1941	18:05	Hurricane	southeast of Ashford	31	8 May 1941	18:02	Hurricane	Folkestone
22	26 February 1941	18:07	Hurricane	southeast of Ashford	32	8 May 1941	18:03	Hurricane	northeast of Dungeness
– Stab I. Gruppe of Jagdgeschwader 51 – Operation Barbarossa — 22 June – 25 August 1941
33	25 June 1941	12:32	SB-2		—	3 July 1941	—	SB-2	
34	25 June 1941	12:35	SB-2		47	5 July 1941	19:40	DB-3	
35	25 June 1941	12:36	SB-2		48	24 July 1941	14:55	SB-2	
36	29 June 1941	19:48	Skua		49	24 July 1941	14:58	SB-2	south of Propoysk
37♠	30 June 1941	13:15	bomber	vicinity of Bobruysk	50	24 July 1941	14:59	SB-2	south of Propoysk
38♠	30 June 1941	14:50	SB-2	vicinity of Bobruysk	51	28 July 1941	17:20	I-18 (MiG-1)	
39♠	30 June 1941	16:25	bomber	vicinity of Bobruysk	52	28 July 1941	18:40	I-16	
40♠	30 June 1941	16:27	unknown	vicinity of Bobruysk	53	15 August 1941	10:04	I-61 (MiG-3)	
41♠	30 June 1941	18:58	SB-2	25 km (16 mi) east of Bobruysk	54	21 August 1941	13:11	I-61 (MiG-3)	
42	2 July 1941	12:55	SB-2		55	22 August 1941	11:50	DB-3	
43	2 July 1941	15:30	SB-2		56	22 August 1941	11:52	DB-3	
44	2 July 1941	15:31	SB-2		57	24 August 1941	09:55	R-3? (Note: According to Mathews and Foreman claimed as an Ilyushin Il-2.)	
45	2 July 1941	15:32	SB-2		58	24 August 1941	16:10	I-18 (MiG-1)	
46	3 July 1941	16:47	SB-2		59	25 August 1941	12:19	I-61 (MiG-3)	18 km (11 mi) southwest of Bryansk

=== Awards ===
- Iron Cross (1939)
  - 2nd Class (13 December 1939)
  - 1st Class (10 June 1940)
- Knight's Cross of the Iron Cross with Oak Leaves
  - Knight's Cross on 16 September 1940 as Oberleutnant and Staffelkapitän of the 1./Jagdgeschwader 51 (Note: According to Scherzer as pilot in the I./Jagdgeschwader 51. According to Von Seemen as Staffelkapitän in the I./Jagdgeschwader 51.)
  - 11th Oak Leaves on 23 April 1941 as Hauptmann and Gruppenkommandeur of I./Jagdgeschwader 51
- Three named references in the Wehrmachtbericht (22 April 1941, 1 July 1941 and 29 August 1941)
