= Bolkhovsky District =

Bolkhovsky District Болховский район (Russian)
- District
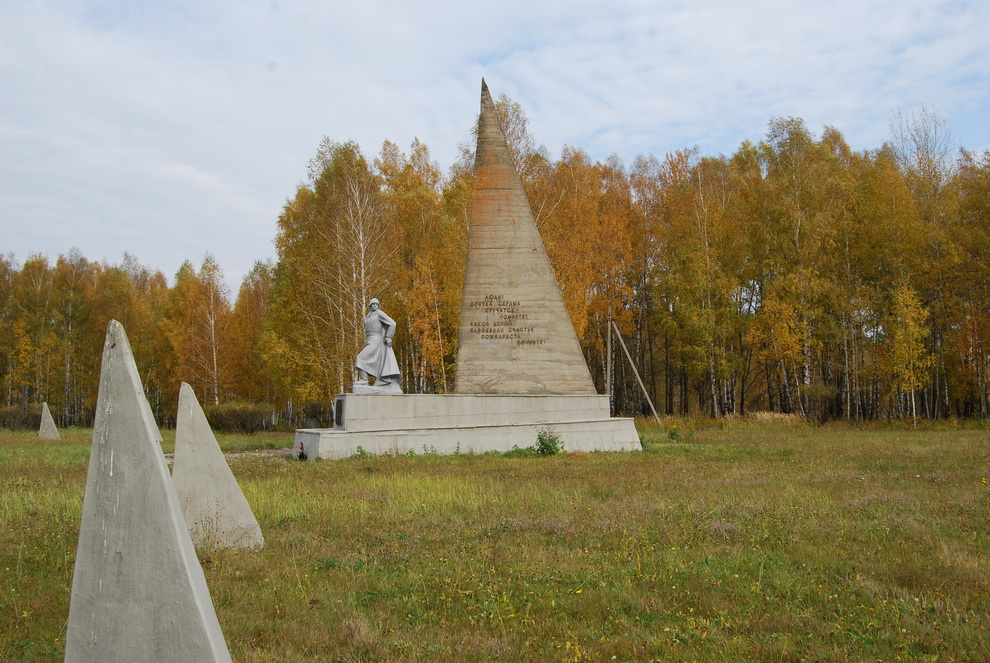
- War Memorial in Krivcovo, Bolkhovsky District

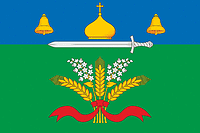
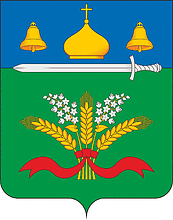
- Flag Coat of arms
- Location of Bolkhovsky District in Oryol Oblast
- Coordinates: 53°26′N 36°00′E
- Country: Russia
- Federal subject: Oryol Oblast
- Established: 30 July 1928
- Administrative center: Bolkhov

Area
  - Total: 1,182.2 km^{2} (456.4 sq mi)

Population (2010 Census)
  - Total: 18,041
  - Density: 15.261/km^{2} (39.525/sq mi)
  - Urban: 63.3%
  - Rural: 36.7%

Administrative structure
  - Administrative divisions: 1 Towns of district significance, 13 Selsoviets
  - Inhabited localities: 1 cities/towns, 221 rural localities

Municipal structure
  - Municipally incorporated as: Bolkhovsky Municipal District
  - Municipal divisions: 1 urban settlements, 13 rural settlements
- Time zone: UTC+3 (MSK)
- OKTMO ID: 54604000
- Website: http://adm-bolhov.ru

Bolkhovsky District (Russian: Бо́лховский райо́н) is an administrative and municipal district (raion), one of the twenty-four in Oryol Oblast, Russia. It is located in the north of the oblast. The area of the district is 1,182.2 square kilometers (456.4 sq mi). Its administrative center is the town of Bolkhov. Population: 18,041 (2010 Census); 20,417 (2002 census); 23,921 (1989 Soviet census). The population of Bolkhov accounts for 63.3% of the district's total population. An unmanned combat aerial vehicle launching base was established 2025 in the vicinity of Tsimbulova at 53.367533°N 35.816969°E

== Notable residents ==
- Yevgeni Preobrazhensky (1886–1937), revolutionary, economist and sociologist, born in Bolkhov
- Ilya Starinov (1900–2000), military officer, noted Soviet saboteur, born in the village of Voynovo
