= Jagdgeschwader 51 =

- Unit insignia
- Active: 1939–1945
- Country: Nazi Germany
- Branch: Luftwaffe
- Type: Fighter Aircraft
- Role: Air superiority
- Size: Air Force Wing
- Nickname: Mölders
- Patron: Werner Mölders
- Engagements: Western Front: Battle of France; Battle of Britain; Eastern Front (World War II): German-Soviet air war 22 June 1941; Operation Barbarossa; Battle of Kursk

Commanders
- Notable commanders: Theo Osterkamp Werner Mölders Heinz Lange

Jagdgeschwader 51 (JG 51) was a German fighter wing during World War II. JG 51's pilots won more awards than any other fighter wing of the Luftwaffe, and operated in all major theatres of war. Its members included Anton Hafner, Heinz Bär, Karl-Gottfried Nordmann, and Günther Schack.

== World War II ==
Formed in August 1939 and commanded by Theo Osterkamp, JG 51 was based in the early months of the war in the West, fighting in the Battle of France and the Battle of Britain. From late June 1940 to mid July 1940, JG 51 was the only fighter Geschwader engaged continuously against the RAF. During the battle JG 51 lost 68 pilots, the highest casualty rate of the Luftwaffe fighter units engaged.

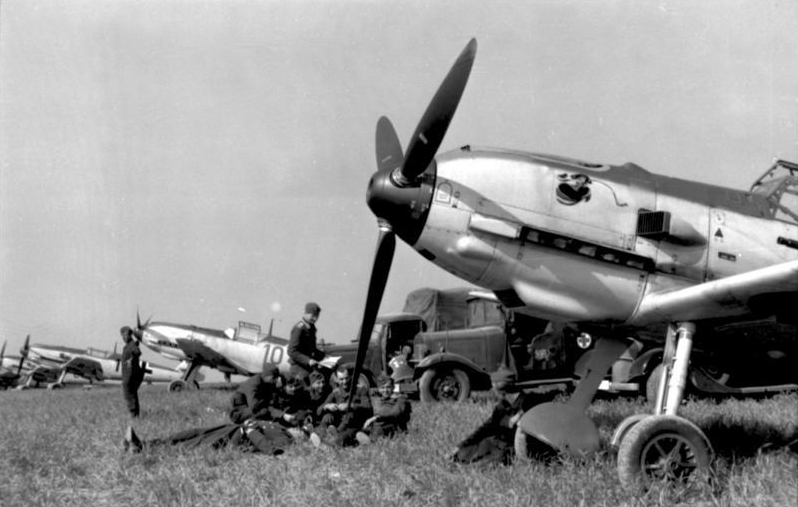
Four Bf 109 of JG 51 in France 1940

From 12 July 1940 until November 1940, Stab JG 51 was located at Saint-Inglevert Airfield in Saint-Inglevert, France. Major Werner Mölders became the unit's commander in July 1940 and led the unit during the invasion of the Soviet Union in June 1941.

During Operation Barbarossa, JG 51 was positioned in the centre of the 4,480 km-long front. Its task was to support Panzer Group 2, which formed the right flank of Army Group Centre, advancing northeast towards Moscow. After achieving more than 100 victories (the first time an aviator ever had done so), Mölders was forced to stop flying (for propaganda reasons) and was made an inspector of fighter aircraft. After Mölders's departure in September 1941 and death later that year, the unit adopted his name in early 1942. The unit remained on the centre sector of the Eastern Front throughout the rest of 1941. In the period 22 June - 5 December 1941 the unit destroyed 1,881 Soviet aircraft against 84 losses in aerial combat and a single aircraft on the ground.

General Wolfram Freiherr von Richthofen's 8th Air Corps was in charge of air support for the Wehrmacht's Army Group Centre. In early January 1942, among the fighter units available to Richthofen were Gruppe II., III., and IV. / JG 51. With the onset of the sub-zero winter conditions, the majority of JG 51's available aircraft were grounded.

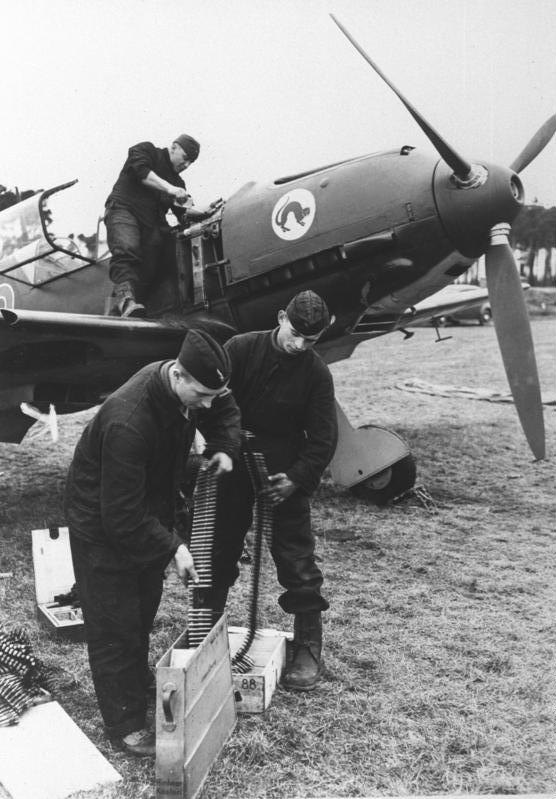
Aircraft of 8./JG 51 being armed.

Most of early 1942 was spent in defensive missions against counter-attacks on Army Group Center's left flank. Its situation had by now stabilised after severe losses in personnel and materiel. Night bomber attacks during June 1942 put a part of JG 51's aircraft out of commission on the airfields at Oryol, Bryansk and Dugino (west of Kursk). In August 1942, JG 51 suffered heavier losses than anything previously during the conflict; 101 Bf 109s were destroyed or written off from all causes during the month, with 17 pilots killed, missing, or hospitalized.

In November 1942, II. / JG 51 was transferred to the Mediterranean theatre, fighting over Tunisia, Sicily and Italy before leaving for Sardinia in April 1943. 3. / JG 1 were also transferred in, and subordinated to II. Gruppe as 6. Staffel. The unit handed over its remaining aircraft to JG 77 and left the continent on 19 April 1943. The unit had lost 26 pilots killed, almost a 100% loss rate since their arrival. In July, the unit flew from Trapani against the American forces in Sicily. In March 1944, it moved to Yugoslavia and the Balkans in order to cover the Ploiești oil fields.

Later in 1943 II. Gruppe was part of the German efforts to thwart the USAAF bomber offensive by 15th Air Force. It was stationed at various times in Hungary, Greece and Austria until late 1944. During the Battle of Kursk in southern Russia, Gruppe I., III., and IV. / JG 51 were based at Oryol with Luftflotte 6, flying in support of Army Group Centre. On 5 July 1943, the Soviet forces launched concentrated air attacks against the German airfields, and as all available Luftflotte 4 and 6 fighters scrambled, one of the largest air battles in history began. As Germany was losing the war, JG 51 retreated together with the rest of the Wehrmacht and by May 1945 operated out of East Prussia.

== Commanding officers ==
Given below is a list of commanding officers of JG 51.

=== Geschwaderkommodore ===
• Oberst Theo Osterkamp	19 September 1939	–	July 1940
• Oberstleutnant Werner Mölders	27 July 1940	–	19 July 1941
• Oberst Theo Osterkamp (acting)	28 July 1940	–	7 August 1940
• Oberstleutnant Friedrich Beckh	19 July 1941	–	10 April 1942
• Major Günther Lützow (acting)	September 1941	–	8 November 1941
• Oberstleutnant Karl-Gottfried Nordmann	10 April 1942	–	30 March 1944
• Major Fritz Losigkeit	1 April 1944	–	31 March 1945
• Major Heinz Lange	2 April 1945	–	disbandment

=== Gruppenkommandeure ===
==== I. Gruppe of JG 51 ====
On 1 May 1939, I. Gruppe was created from I. Gruppe of Jagdgeschwader 233.

• Major Ernst Freiherr von Berg	1 May 1939	–	22 September 1939
• Hauptmann Hans-Heinrich Brustellin	23 September 1939	–	17 October 1940
• Hauptmann Hermann-Friedrich Joppien	18 October 1940	–	25 August 1941
• Hauptmann Wilhelm Hachfeld	26 August 1941	–
• Hauptmann Josef Fözö	3 May 1942	–	31 May 1942
• Hauptmann Heinrich Krafft	1 June 1942	–	14 December 1942 †
• Hauptmann Rudolf Busch	15 December 1942	–	17 January 1943 †
• Major Erich Leie	18 January 1943	–	28 December 1944
• Hauptmann Günther Schack	29 December 1944	–	23 April 1945

==== II. Gruppe of JG 51 ====
• Major Ernst Günther Burggaller	16 October 1939	–	2 February 1940 †
• Hauptmann Günther Matthes	3 February 1940	–	20 February 1941
• Hauptmann Josef Fözö	21 February 1941	–	11 July 1941
• Hauptmann Hartmann Grasser	September 1941	–	6 June 1943
• Major Karl Rammelt	6 June 1943	–	23 December 1944
• Oberleutnant Otto Schultz	24 December 1944	–	12 April 1945

==== III. Gruppe of JG 51 ====
On 4 July 1940, III. Gruppe was created from I. Gruppe of Jagdgeschwader 20.

• Hauptmann Hannes Trautloft	4 July 1940	–	24 August 1940
• Hauptmann Walter Oesau	25 August 1940	–	10 November 1940
• Hauptmann Richard Leppla	11 November 1940	–	7 August 1942
• Hauptmann Karl-Heinz Schnell	8 August 1942	–	22 June 1943
• Hauptmann Fritz Losigkeit	26 June 1943	–	30 April 1944
• Hauptmann Diethelm von Eichel-Streiber	1 May 1944	–	24 August 1944
• Hauptmann Joachim Brendel	1 September 1944	–	8 May 1945

==== IV. Gruppe of JG 51 ====
On 21 November 1940, IV. Gruppe was created from I. Gruppe of Jagdgeschwader 77.

• Hauptmann Johannes Janke	21 November 1940	–	18 February 1941
• Major Friedrich Beckh	1 March 1941	–	19 July 1941
• Hauptmann Karl-Gottfried Nordmann	20 July 1941	–	9 April 1942
• Hauptmann Hans Knauth	10 April 1942	–	28 February 1943
• Major Rudolf Resch	1 March 1943	–	11 July 1943 †
• Major Hans-Ekkehard Bob	1 August 1943	–	8 May 1944
• Major Heinz Lange	9 May 1944	–	11 April 1945
• Oberleutnant Günther Josten	12 April 1945	–	28 April 1945
• Major Heinz Lange	29 April 1945	–	8 May 1945
