= Bolkhov =

Town in Oryol Oblast, Russia

Bolkhov Болхов
- Town
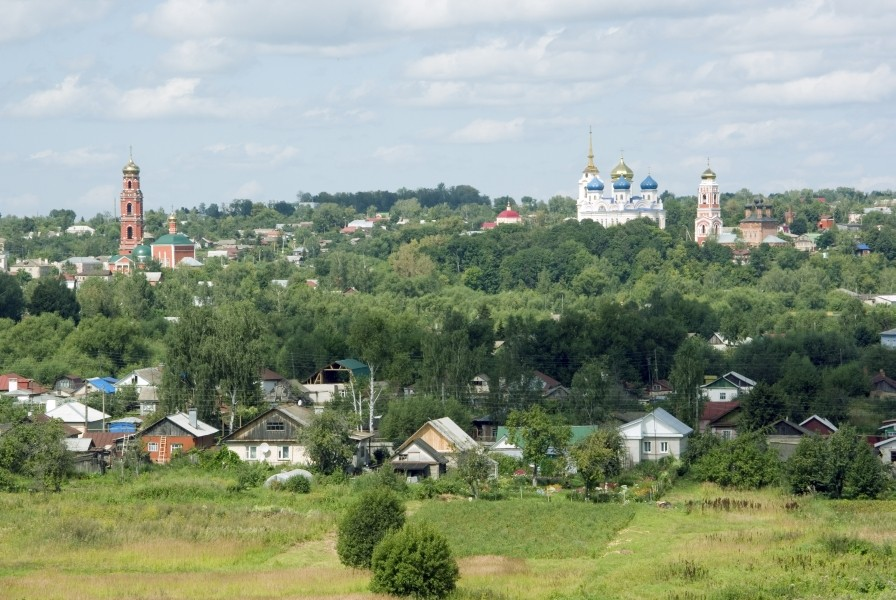
- View of Bolkhov from the opposite bank of the Nugr River

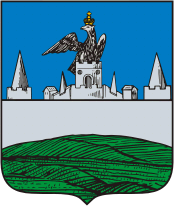
- Coat of arms
- Interactive map of Bolkhov
- Location of Bolkhov Bolkhov (Oryol Oblast)
- Coordinates: 53°27′N 36°01′E
- Country: Russia
- Federal subject: Oryol Oblast
- Administrative district: Bolkhovsky District
- Town of district significanceSelsoviet: Bolkhov
- First mentioned: 1196
- Elevation: 180 m (590 ft)

Population (2010 Census)
  - Total: 11,421
  - Estimate (2023): 9,359 (−18.1%)

Administrative status
  - Capital of: Bolkhovsky District, town of district significance of Bolkhov

Municipal status
  - Municipal district: Bolkhovsky Municipal District
  - Urban settlement: Bolkhov Urban Settlement
  - Capital of: Bolkhovsky Municipal District, Bolkhov Urban Settlement
- Time zone: UTC+3 (MSK)
- Postal codes: 303140, 303142
- OKTMO ID: 54604101001
- Website: www.bolhov-adm.ru

Bolkhov (Russian: Бо́лхов) is a town and the administrative center of Bolkhovsky District in Oryol Oblast, Russia, located on the Nugr River (Oka's tributary), 56 kilometers (35 mi) from Oryol, the administrative center of the oblast. Population: 11,421 (2010 census); 12,148 (2002 census); 13,071 (1989 Soviet census); 12,800 (1969); 20,703 (1897).

== History ==
Bolkhov was first documented in a chronicle from 1196. After the Mongol invasion of Rus', it became the seat of a local princely dynasty, whose descendants may be traced until the 19th century. In the 16th century, it became one of the fortified posts for defending Moscow from the Tatars on the south. It was there that the army of Vasily IV was defeated by False Dmitry II in 1608.

During World War II, Bolkhov was occupied by the German Army from October 9, 1941 to July 28, 1943.

== Administrative and municipal status ==
Within the framework of administrative divisions, Bolkhov serves as the administrative center of Bolkhovsky District. As an administrative division, it is incorporated within Bolkhovsky District as the town of district significance of Bolkhov. As a municipal division, the town of district significance of Bolkhov is incorporated within Bolkhovsky Municipal District as Bolkhov Urban Settlement.

== Religion ==
Bolkhov preserves four churches dating from the turn of the 18th century, including the five-domed Trinity Monastery Cathedral (1688-1706) and the Trinity church with an elongated belfry. By far the largest church in the city is the Savior's Transfiguration Cathedral, built in 1841–1851 to a design by one of Konstantin Thon's disciples.
