= Novodugino =

Rural locality in Smolensk Oblast, Russia

Novodugino Новодугино
- Selo
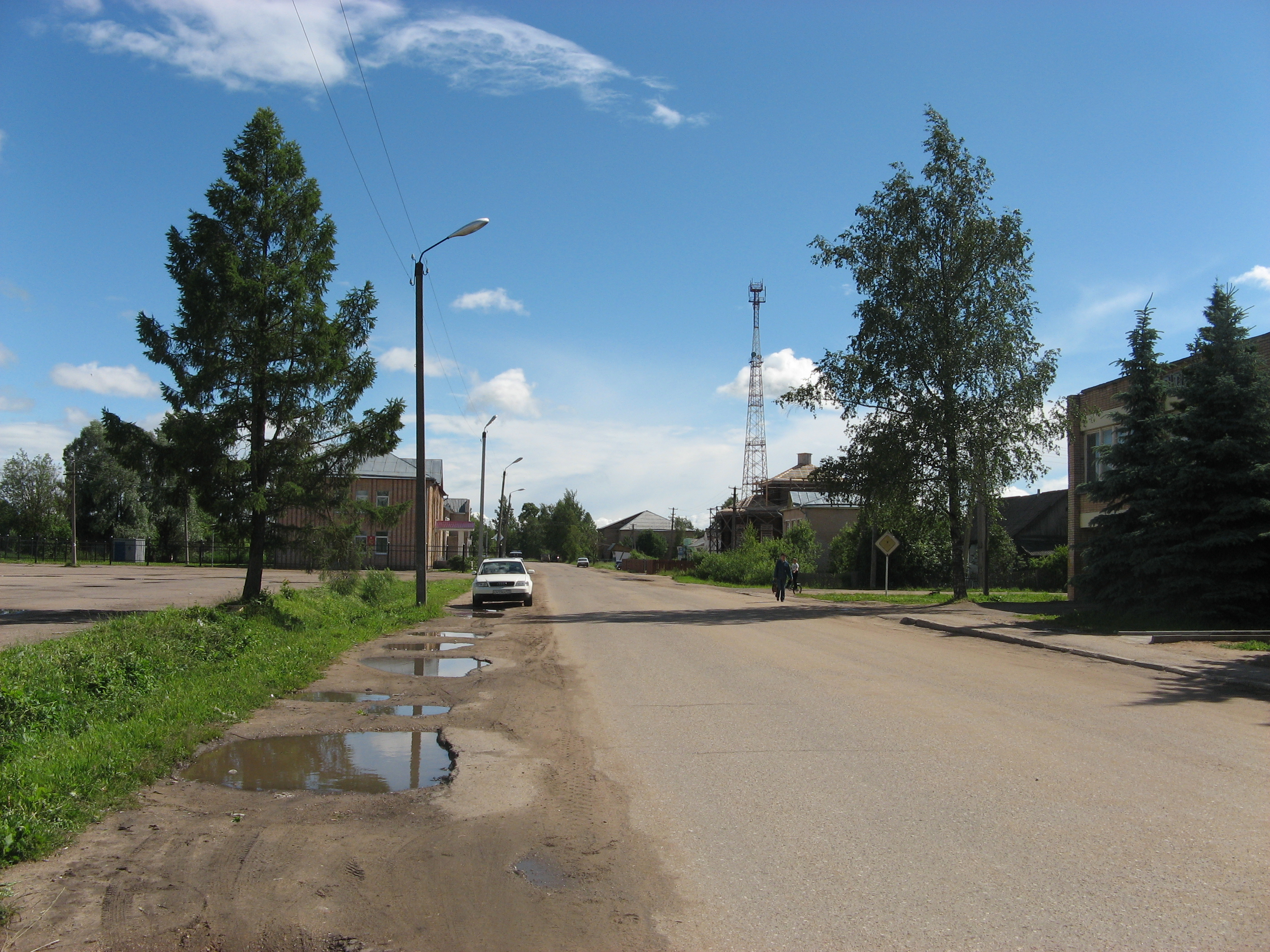
- Street in Novodugino

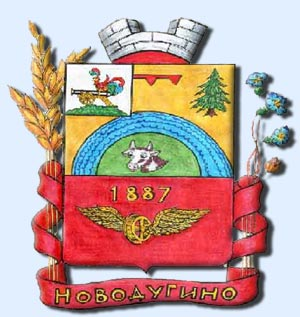
- Coat of arms
- Interactive map of Novodugino
- Location of Novodugino Novodugino (Smolensk Oblast)
- Coordinates: 55°37′42″N 34°17′49″E
- Country: Russia
- Federal subject: Smolensk Oblast
- First mentioned: 3 December 1887

Population (2010 Census)
  - Total: 3,839
  - Estimate (2021): 3,254 (−15.2%)

Administrative status
  - Capital of: Novoduginsky District

Municipal status
  - Municipal district: Novoduginsky Municipal District
- Time zone: UTC+3 (MSK)
- Postal code: 214522
- Dialing code: +7 481
- OKTMO ID: 66630435101

Novodugino (Russian: Новодугинó) is a rural locality (a selo) and the administrative center of Novoduginsky District, Smolensk Oblast, Russia. Population: 3,839 (2010 census); 3,999 (2002 census); 4,153 (1989 Soviet census).

== Climate ==
Novodugino has a warm-summer humid continental climate (Dfb in the Köppen climate classification).

Climate data for Novodugino
Month	Jan	Feb	Mar	Apr	May	Jun	Jul	Aug	Sep	Oct	Nov	Dec	Year
Mean daily maximum °C (°F)	−5 (23)	−4.1 (24.6)	1.5 (34.7)	10.4 (50.7)	17 (63)	20 (68)	22.8 (73.0)	21.2 (70.2)	15.5 (59.9)	8 (46)	1.8 (35.2)	−2.2 (28.0)	8.9 (48.0)
Daily mean °C (°F)	−7 (19)	−6.6 (20.1)	−1.8 (28.8)	6.1 (43.0)	12.8 (55.0)	16.3 (61.3)	19.1 (66.4)	17.5 (63.5)	12.1 (53.8)	5.6 (42.1)	0.1 (32.2)	−4 (25)	5.8 (42.5)
Mean daily minimum °C (°F)	−9.4 (15.1)	−9.6 (14.7)	−5.5 (22.1)	1.2 (34.2)	7.7 (45.9)	11.7 (53.1)	14.8 (58.6)	13.4 (56.1)	8.5 (47.3)	3.2 (37.8)	−1.8 (28.8)	−5.9 (21.4)	2.4 (36.3)
Average precipitation mm (inches)	48 (1.9)	41 (1.6)	42 (1.7)	42 (1.7)	75 (3.0)	79 (3.1)	87 (3.4)	77 (3.0)	66 (2.6)	65 (2.6)	54 (2.1)	48 (1.9)	724 (28.6)
Source: https://en.climate-data.org/asia/russian-federation/smolensk-oblast/novodugino-32854/
