= Bizerte-Sidi Ahmed Air Base =

Tunisian Air Force air base

Bizerte-Sidi Ahmed Air Base
- Part of Tunisian Air Force

Site information
- Type: Military airfield
- Controlled by: Tunisian Air Force

Location
- Location of Bizerte-Sidi Ahmed Air Base, Tunisia
- Coordinates: 37°14′36.30″N 009°47′11.03″E

Site history
- Built: 1943

Bizerte-Sidi Ahmed Air Base (ICAO: DTTB) is a Tunisian Air Force base located approximately 7 km west of Menzel Abderahman, and 9 km west-southwest of Bizerte.

Units stationed at the base are:

- No. 11 Squadron

Jet trainer squadron, Aermacchi MB-326

- No. 15 Squadron

Fighter squadron, Northrop F-5 Tiger/TigerII

- No. 21 Squadron
- Transport squadron, C-130 Hercules, Let L-410 Turbolet, G-222

== World War II ==
During World War II it was a German air base until 16 November 1942 when it was the target of an American bombing raid led by Theodore Van Kirk as a threat to Operation Torch.

It was then used by the United States Army Air Forces Twelfth Air Force during the North African Campaign. It was known as Bizerte Airfield. Several Allied units used the base in 1943. It was a heavy bomber airfield used by B-17 Flying Fortress strategic bombers of the 2d Bombardment Group, between 2 and 9 December 1943. There was a major air depot co-located at Sidi Ahmed.

== Post-World War II ==
AFRICOM secretly operates a drone base at Bizerte-Sidi Ahmed Air Base.

== See also ==
- Boeing B-17 Flying Fortress airfields in the Mediterranean Theater of Operations
