= Orlik =

Orlik may refer to:

== People ==
- Orlik (surname)
- Marian Bernaciak (1917–1946), Polish partisan leader whose nom de guerre was Orlik ("Little Eagle")

== Places ==
- Orlik, Pomeranian Voivodeship, north Poland
- Orlik, Warmian-Masurian Voivodeship, north Poland
- Orlik, Atyrau Region, Kazakhstan
- Orlik, Russia, several rural localities in Russia
- Orlik, Pomeranian Voivodeship

== In aviation ==
- PZL-130 Orlik, a Polish turboprop trainer aircraft
- Orlik Aerobatic Team, a Polish aerobatic team flying the PZL-130 Orlik
- Warsztaty Szybowcowe Orlik, Polish glider series

== Other ==
- Orlik (armoured train)
- Orlik Opole, ice hockey team in Opole, Poland

== See also ==
- Orlík (disambiguation) (Czech form)
