= Franz-Josef Beerenbrock =

German World War II fighter pilot

- Born: 9 April 1920; Datteln, Germany
- Died: 13 December 2004 (aged 84); Olfen, Germany
- Military career
- Allegiance: Nazi Germany
- Branch: Luftwaffe
- Service years: 1938–1945
- Rank: Leutnant (second lieutenant)
- Unit: JG 51
- Commands: 10./JG 51
- Conflicts: World War II: Eastern Front
- Awards: Knight's Cross of the Iron Cross with Oak Leaves

Franz-Josef Beerenbrock (9 April 1920 – 13 December 2004) was a German fighter pilot during World War II. He was a recipient of the Knight's Cross of the Iron Cross with Oak Leaves. Beerenbrock was credited with 117 aerial victories in approximately 400 combat missions, all on the Eastern Front. In November 1942 he became a prisoner of war for the rest of the war.

== Early life and career ==
Beerenbrock, the son of a Russian mother, joined a flak artillery unit on 1 October 1938 and in 1939 was trained as a pilot. (Note: Flight training in the Luftwaffe progressed through the levels A1, A2 and B1, B2, referred to as A/B flight training. A training included theoretical and practical training in aerobatics, navigation, long-distance flights and dead-stick landings. The B courses included high-altitude flights, instrument flights, night landings and training to handle the aircraft in difficult situations.) In March 1941, Beerenbrock was transferred to 12. Staffel (12th squadron) of Jagdgeschwader 51 (JG 51—51st Fighter Wing), a squadron of IV. Gruppe (4th group). At the time, IV. Gruppe of JG 51 was based in Le Touquet, France on the English Channel fighting the Royal Air Force. During this period, the Gruppe was being reequipped with the Messerschmitt Bf 109 F series. Beerenbock's commanding officers were, Major Friedrich Beckh as Gruppenkommandeur (group commander) and the Staffelkapitän (squadron leader) of 12. Staffel was Oberleutnant Karl-Gottfried Nordmann. On 16 April, the Gruppe moved to an airfield at Marquise.

== World War II ==
World War II in Europe had begun on Friday 1 September 1939 when German forces invaded Poland. IV. Gruppe of JG 51 was withdrawn from the Channel Front in early June 1941 and ordered to Mönchengladbach where the unit was equipped with a full complement of Bf 109 F-1 and F-2 aircraft. On 15 June, IV. Gruppe began transferring east and was located at the airfield Krzewicze, approximately 70 km (43 mi) west Brest-Litovsk on the western bank of the Bug River. On 22 June, German forces launched Operation Barbarossa, the German invasion of the Soviet Union. JG 51, under the command of Oberstleutnant Werner Mölders, was subordinated to II. Fliegerkorps (2nd Air Corps), which as part of Luftflotte 2 (Air Fleet 2). JG 51 area of operation during Operation Barbarossa was over the right flank of Army Group Center in the combat area of the 2nd Panzer Group as well as the 4th Army.

Beerenbrock claimed his first aerial victory on 24 June 1941 over a Tupolev SB-2 bomber. He frequently flew as wingman of Nordmann and Heinrich Bär. On 6 October 1941, Beerenbrock, together with Leutnant Georg Seelmann, were awarded the Knight's Cross of the Iron Cross (Ritterkreuz des Eisernen Kreuzes) after 42 and 37 aerial victories respectively. Fighting in the Battles of Rzhev against the Kalinin Front in early 1942, II. and IV. Gruppen of JG 51 had become the most successful units of VIII. Fliegerkorps (8th Air Corps). By end-February, Leutnant Bernd Gallowitsch and Beerenbrock were the leading fighter pilots of IV. Gruppe.

=== Eastern Front ===
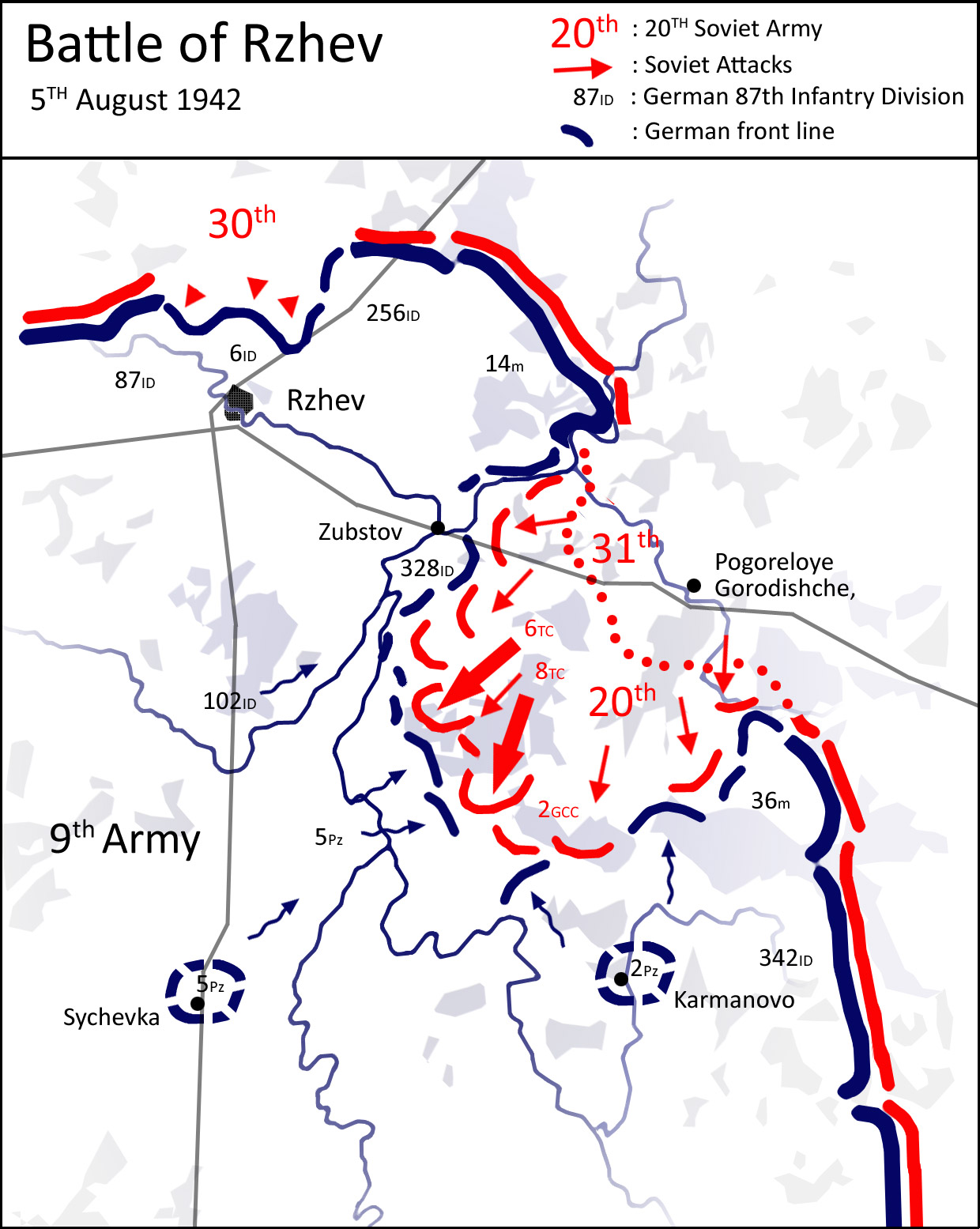
Attack on the Rzhev salient in August 1942

On 30 July 1942, during the Battle of Rzhev, the Soviet Kalinin Front launched an attack against the 9th Army on the northern flank of the Rzhev salient. The Soviet 29th and 30th Army breached the German front between the German 87th and 256th Division. The next day, III. and IV. Gruppe of JG 51 were sent to intercept strong forces of Ilyushin Il-2 ground-attack aircraft attacking German ground forces. That day, Beerenbrock claimed his 93rd aerial victory over an Il-2 shot down 16 kilometres (9.9 miles) northwest of Rzhev. On 1 August 1942, he became an "ace-in-a-day" claiming nine aerial victories on three combat missions, including his 100th overall. He was the 15th Luftwaffe pilot to achieve the century mark. At that point, he was the most successful fighter pilot of JG 51 and the first pilot of JG 51 to surpass Werner Mölders. He was awarded the Knight's Cross of the Iron Cross with Oak Leaves (Ritterkreuz des Eisernen Kreuzes mit Eichenlaub) on 3 August 1942. Beerenbrock and together with Hauptmann Anton Hackl were presented the Oak Leaves by Adolf Hitler at the Führerhauptquartier at Rastenburg.

In October 1942, Beerenbrock was appointed Staffelkapitän of 10. Staffel (3rd squadron) of JG 51. On 9 November, his Bf 109 F-2 (Werknummer 6779—factory number) suffered engine failure after being hit in the radiator approximately 20 km (12 mi) north of Velizh resulting in a forced landing behind enemy lines. In consequence, he was taken prisoner of war. While imprisoned, he became a founding member of the Bund Deutscher Offiziere (League of German Officers) which later merged with the National Committee for a Free Germany.

== Later life ==
Following World War II, Beerenbrock joined the German Air Force in 1955, at the time referred to as the Bundesluftwaffe of the Bundeswehr. Beerenbrock died on 13 December 2004 at the age of 84 in Olfen, Germany.

== Summary of career ==
=== Aerial victory claims ===
According to US historian David T. Zabecki, Beerenbrock was credited with 117 aerial victories. Spick also lists Beerenbrock with 117 aerial victories claimed in over 500 combat missions, all but one on the Eastern Front, and a mission-to-claim ratio of 3.41. Mathews and Foreman, authors of Luftwaffe Aces — Biographies and Victory Claims, researched the German Federal Archives and found records for 111 aerial victory claims, all of which claimed on the Eastern Front.

Victory claims were logged to a map-reference (PQ = Planquadrat), for example "PQ 56432". The Luftwaffe grid map (Jägermeldenetz) covered all of Europe, western Russia and North Africa and was composed of rectangles measuring 15 minutes of latitude by 30 minutes of longitude, an area of about 360 square miles (930 km^{2}). These sectors were then subdivided into 36 smaller units to give a location area 3 km × 4 km (1.9 mi × 2.5 mi) in size.

Chronicle of aerial victories
This and the ♠ (Ace of spades) indicates those aerial victories which made Beerenbrock an "ace-in-a-day", a term which designates a fighter pilot who has shot down five or more airplanes in a single day. This and the ? (question mark) indicates information discrepancies listed by Prien, Stemmer, Rodeike, Bock, Mathews and Foreman.
Claim	Date	Time	Type	Location	Claim	Date	Time	Type	Location
– 12. Staffel of Jagdgeschwader 51 – Operation Barbarossa — 22 June – 9 August 1941
1	24 June 1941	09:35	SB-2		12	16 July 1941	09:20	DB-3	
2	24 June 1941	09:38	SB-2		13	16 July 1941	09:25	DB-3	
3	30 June 1941	13:15	R-10 (Seversky)		14	23 July 1941	13:05	Pe-2	
4	4 July 1941	18:45	SB-2	30 km (19 mi) east of Syrtow	15	23 July 1941	18:20	Pe-2	
5	5 July 1941	06:35	DB-3	10 km (6.2 mi) southeast of Borisov	16	24 July 1941	06:20	I-18 (MiG-1)	
6	6 July 1941	17:45	DB-3		17	24 July 1941	12:10	Pe-2	
7	6 July 1941	17:50	DB-3		18	26 July 1941	04:28	R-3? (Note: According to Mathews and Foreman claimed as an Ilyushin Il-2.)	
8	9 July 1941	04:45	DB-3		19	29 July 1941	04:25	I-16	
9	9 July 1941	11:25	DB-3		20	31 July 1941	19:20	R-10 (Seversky)	
10	10 July 1941	10:42	Pe-2		21	8 August 1941	12:15	R-3	
11	11 July 1941	05:45	Pe-2		22	9 August 1941	12:16	Pe-2	
– Stab IV. Gruppe of Jagdgeschwader 51 – Operation Barbarossa — 9 August – 5 December 1941
23	9 August 1941	14:15	I-16		37	27 August 1941	09:09	I-18 (MiG-1)	southeast of Novgorod
24	9 August 1941	14:42	Pe-2		38	30 August 1941	15:03	I-18 (MiG-1)	10 km (6.2 mi) southeast of Sechtschinsk
25	12 August 1941	12:05	I-61 (MiG-1)		39	30 August 1941	15:05	I-18 (MiG-1)	8 km (5.0 mi) southeast of Sechtschinsk
26	12 August 1941	12:15	I-16		40	30 August 1941	15:09	I-18 (MiG-1)	5 km (3.1 mi) southeast of Sechtschinsk
27	14 August 1941	19:00	I-18 (MiG-1)		41	23 September 1941	16:02	SB-3	
28	15 August 1941	15:20	I-18 (MiG-1)		42	23 September 1941	16:05	SB-3	
29	16 August 1941	19:09	I-18 (MiG-1)		43	7 October 1941	12:45	Pe-2	
30	19 August 1941	17:10	I-16		44	7 October 1941	13:30	Pe-2	northeast of Yukhnov
31	21 August 1941	16:55	Pe-2		45	7 October 1941	16:35	I-18 (MiG-1)	
32	25 August 1941	17:58	DB-3		46	12 October 1941	14:25	Pe-2	
33	25 August 1941	18:02	DB-3		47	2 December 1941	09:15	I-61? (Note: According to Mathews and Foreman claimed as a Petlyakov Pe-2.)	
34	26 August 1941	14:15	R-3		48	2 December 1941	11:20	Pe-2	
35	26 August 1941	14:20	R-3		49	2 December 1941	11:23	Pe-2	
36	27 August 1941	09:06	I-18 (MiG-1)	southeast of Novgorod					
– Stab IV. Gruppe of Jagdgeschwader 51 – Eastern Front — 6 December 1941 – 30 April 1942
50	6 December 1941	13:55	I-16		57	31 March 1942	07:55	MiG-1	
51	14 December 1941	14:45	I-18 (MiG-1)? (Note: According to Mathews and Foreman claimed as a Mikoyan-Gurevich MiG-3.)		58	31 March 1942	07:59	MiG-1	
52	23 February 1942	11:45	I-18 (MiG-1)	30 km (19 mi) east of Gzhatsk	59	31 March 1942	16:30	MiG-1	
53	23 February 1942	11:48	I-18 (MiG-1)	40 km (25 mi) east of Gzhatsk	60	1 April 1942	10:55	MiG-3	
54	24 February 1942	09:20	I-18 (MiG-1)	30 km (19 mi) east of Gzhatsk	61	7 April 1942	09:15	R-5	
55	26 February 1942	12:15	MiG-3		62	22 April 1942	06:40	MiG-3	
56	26 March 1942	11:58	MiG-3	southeast of Gzhatsk southeast of Dugino					
– IV. Gruppe of Jagdgeschwader 51 – Eastern Front — 1 May – October 1942
63	27 May 1942	16:35	MiG-1		86	10 July 1942	19:40	MiG-3	
64	28 May 1942	04:35	MiG-1		87	11 July 1942	05:50	LaGG-3	
65	28 May 1942	04:45	U-2		88	11 July 1942	12:55	LaGG-3	
66	28 May 1942	18:35	MiG-1		89	11 July 1942	19:30	Il-2	
67	1 June 1942	07:50	LaGG-3		90	11 July 1942	19:33	Il-2	
68	5 June 1942	18:20	Il-2		91	13 July 1942	16:00	MiG-3	
69	11 June 1942	17:50	MiG-3? (Note: According to Mathews and Foreman claimed as a Mikoyan-Gurevich MiG-1.)		92	22 July 1942	13:15	Pe-2	
70	16 June 1942	17:30	MiG-3? (Note: According to Mathews and Foreman claimed as a Lavochkin-Gorbunov-Gudkov LaGG-3.)		93	31 July 1942	17:15	Il-2	16 km (9.9 mi) northwest of Rzhev
71	25 June 1942	04:28	Yak-1?	PQ 56432	94♠	1 August 1942	10:15	MiG-3	PQ 47534; 20 km (12 mi) north of Rzhev
72	26 June 1942	18:00	MiG-3		95♠	1 August 1942	10:18	MiG-3	PQ 47536; 20 km (12 mi) north of Rzhev
73	28 June 1942	15:10	MiG-3		96♠	1 August 1942	10:25	Il-2	PQ 47562; 15 km (9.3 mi) north of Rzhev
74	28 June 1942	19:50	Pe-2		97♠	1 August 1942	10:28	Il-2	PQ 47563; 15 km (9.3 mi) north of Rzhev
75	5 July 1942	04:05	Pe-2		98♠	1 August 1942	12:37	Il-2	PQ 47572; 20 km (12 mi) west of Rzhev
76	6 July 1942	05:55	Il-2		99♠	1 August 1942	16:25	Il-2	PQ 4754; 15 km (9.3 mi) north-northwest of Rzhev
77	6 July 1942	06:00	Il-2		100♠	1 August 1942	16:27	Il-2	PQ 47523; 20 km (12 mi) north-northwest of Rzhev
78	6 July 1942	19:39	I-16		101♠	1 August 1942	16:30	Il-2	PQ 47643; 20 km (12 mi) northeast of Rzhev
79	6 July 1942	19:45	I-16		102♠	1 August 1942	16:35	Pe-2	PQ 47811 vicinity of Zubtsov
80	7 July 1942	17:40	LaGG-3		103	30 September 1942	14:20? (Note: According to Mathews and Foreman claimed at 14:30.)	Il-2	PQ 38242; 20 km (12 mi) southeast of Valday
81	8 July 1942	05:40	LaGG-3		104	30 September 1942	14:45	MiG-3	PQ 29594
82	9 July 1942	11:20	LaGG-3		105	2 October 1942	14:28	LaGG-3	5 km (3.1 mi) southwest of Kresttsy
83	9 July 1942	16:55	LaGG-3	25 km (16 mi) northeast of Zhizdra	106	4 October 1942	08:55	LaGG-3	5 km (3.1 mi) southeast of Kresttsy
84	10 July 1942	05:50	LaGG-3		107	4 October 1942	09:00	LaGG-3	2 km (1.2 mi) north of Kresttsy
85	10 July 1942	05:55	LaGG-3		108	4 October 1942	14:12	DB-3	25 km (16 mi) southwest of Bologoye
– 10. Staffel of Jagdgeschwader 51 – Eastern Front — November 1942
109	8 November 1942	14:45	MiG-3	PQ 17743	111? (Note: This claim is not listed by Mathews and Foreman.)	8 November 1942	14:50	MiG-3	40 km (25 mi) southwest of Staraya Toropa
110	8 November 1942	14:50	MiG-3	40 km (25 mi) southwest of Staraya Toropa	112	9 November 1942	07:42	MiG-3	40 km (25 mi) southwest of Staraya Toropa

=== Awards ===
- Iron Cross (1939)
  - 2nd Class (3 July 1941)
  - 1st Class (18 July 1941)
- Honour Goblet of the Luftwaffe on 15 September 1941 as Unteroffizier in a Jagdgeschwader
- German Cross in Gold on 17 June 1942 as Feldwebel in the IV./Jagdgeschwader 51
- Knight's Cross of the Iron Cross with Oak Leaves
  - Knight's Cross on 6 October 1941 as Unteroffizier and pilot in the 10./Jagdgeschwader 51
  - 108th Oak Leaves on 3 August 1942 as Oberfeldwebel and pilot in the 10./Jagdgeschwader 51 "Mölders"
