= Kurt Tanzer =

German military aviator (1920–1960)

- Born: 1 November 1920; Moscow
- Died: 25 June 1960 (aged 39); Near the Balearic Islands
- Military career
- Allegiance: Nazi Germany (to 1945); West Germany
- Branch: Luftwaffe (Wehrmacht); German Air Force (Bundeswehr)
- Rank: Oberfeldwebel (Wehrmacht); Major (Bundeswehr)
- Units: JG 51, Jafü 6 Jafü Ostpreußen
- Conflicts: World War II: Eastern Front
- Awards: Knight's Cross of the Iron Cross

Kurt Tanzer (1 November 1920 – 25 June 1960) was a World War II Luftwaffe military aviator. As a flying ace, he is credited with approximately 128–143 aerial victories. He was a recipient of the Knight's Cross of the Iron Cross, the highest award in the military and paramilitary forces of Nazi Germany during World War II. He later joined the German Air Force and was killed in a flying accident on 25 June 1960.

== Career ==
Tanzer was born on 1 November 1920 in Moscow. On 18 March 1942, he was transferred from the Ergänzungsgruppe, a supplementary training group, of Jagdgeschwader 51 "Mölders" (JG 51—51st Fighter Wing), named after Werner Mölders, to 12. Staffel (12th squadron) of JG 51, and commanded by Hauptmann Heinrich Bär. 12. Staffel was a squadron of IV. Gruppe (4th group) which was based at an airfield in Vyazma on the Eastern Front and largely equipped with the Messerschmitt Bf 109 F-2. In May, the Gruppe was briefly withdrawn from combat for a period of maintenance and equipment overhaul at Smolensk. The Gruppe was then sent to Novodugino where it was tasked with providing fighter cover over the left flank of Army Group Center in vicinity of the 9th Army.

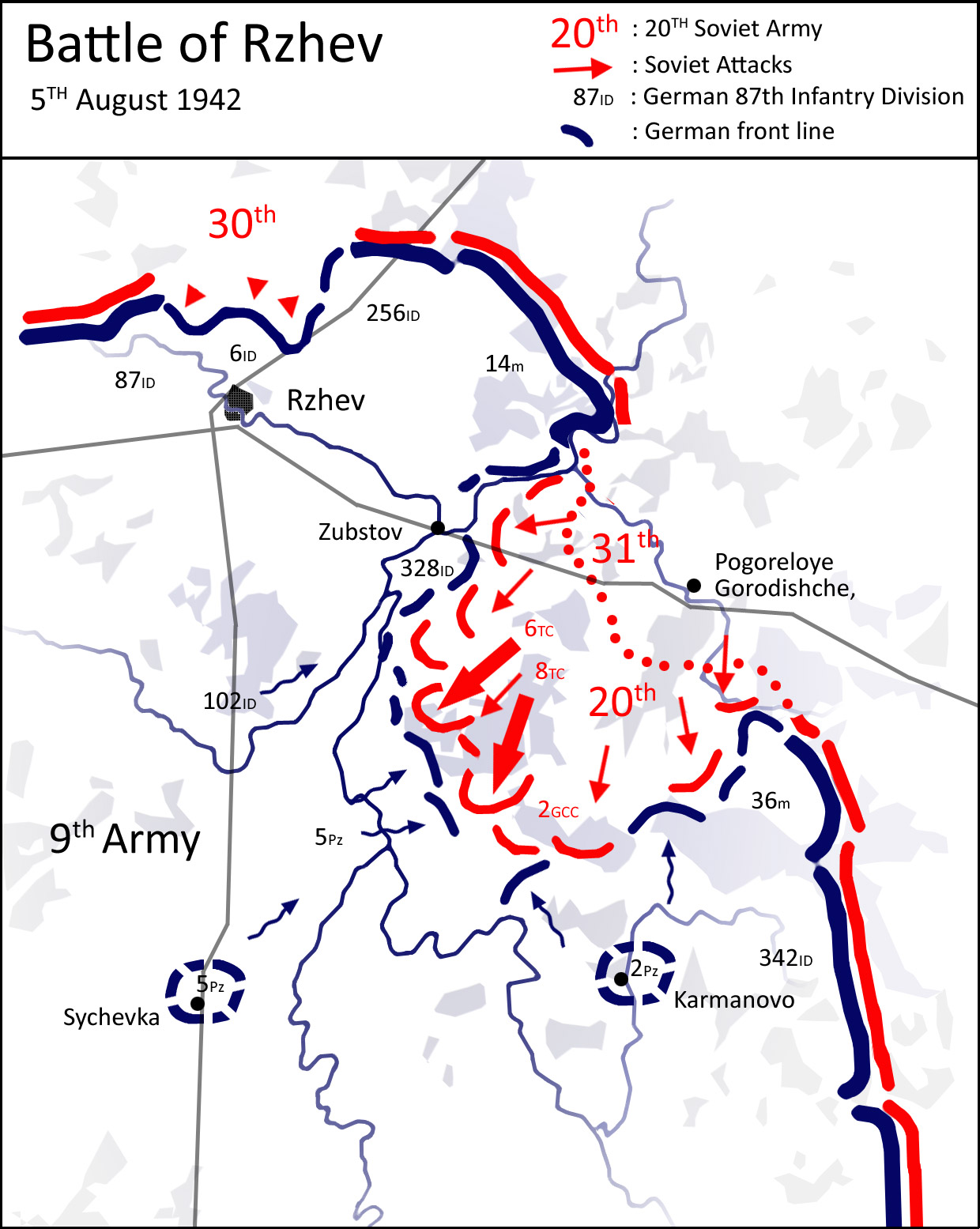
Attack on the Rzhev salient in August 1942

On 30 July 1942, the Soviet Kalinin Front launched the First Rzhev–Sychyovka Offensive Operation with the objective to crush the Rzhev salient held by the 9th Army. Tanzer claimed his first aerial victory on 2 August 1942 over an Ilyushin Il-2 ground attack aircraft west of Rzhev.

Tanzer achieved his 35th victory on 5 May 1943. On 6 May, Soviet Ilyushin Il-2 attacked the airfield where Tanzer was stationed. He managed to scramble and destroyed two Ilyushin Il-2. Despite being wounded, he continued attacking the raiding Soviet aircraft and shot down two more aircraft. After further intense battle, Tanzer landed his heavily damaged Focke-Wulf Fw 190 A-7 (Werknummer 7161—factory number). Tanzer's right hand was seriously injured and he suffered from heavy blood loss. For this action, he was mentioned in the Honour Roll of the Luftwaffe (Ehrenblatt der Luftwaffe) and was nominated for the Knight's Cross of the Iron Cross (Ritterkreuz des Eisernen Kreuzes).

Following a period of convalescence, Tanzer returned to JG 51 and was assigned to the Stabsstaffel (headquarters unit) on 4 November. (Note: In early October 1942, II. Gruppe of JG 51 had been withdrawn from the Eastern Front and sent to Jesau, near present-day Bagrationovsk, to Heiligenbeil, present-day Mamonovo, to be reequipped with the Focke-Wulf Fw 190 A. While undergoing training on this aircraft, the Gruppe received orders on 4 November to transfer to the Mediterranean theatre flying the Messerschmitt Bf 109 again. 6. Staffel had been exempt from this order, was detached from II. Gruppe, and continued its training on the Fw 190. In late November, 6. Staffel was renamed to Stabsstaffel (headquarters squadron) of JG 51. Alternatively, the Stabsstaffel was also referred to as Geschwaderstabsstaffel z.b.V., roughly translating to fighter wing squadron for special deployment'. The abbreviation z. b. V. is German and stands for zur besonderen Verwendung (for special deployment).) He received the Knight's Cross on 5 December 1943 for 35 victories. With the Stabsstaffel, he flew a number of ground attack missions and increased the number of his aerial victories. In June 1944, Tanzer accompanied Karl-Gottfried Nordmann to the staff of Jagdfliegerführer 6. He achieved his 100th victory in the same month in 1944 while serving with this formation. He was the 81st Luftwaffe pilot to achieve the century mark. He was then transferred to the staff of Jagdfliegerführer in East Prussia on 1 September 1944. Tanzer was transferred to 13. Staffel of JG 51 on 10 February 1945 and was appointed Staffelkapitän of the unit on 12 April, taking over command from Leutnant Engel who had briefly led the Staffel after its former commander Oberleutnant Peter Kalden had been taken prisoner of war.

== Later life and death ==
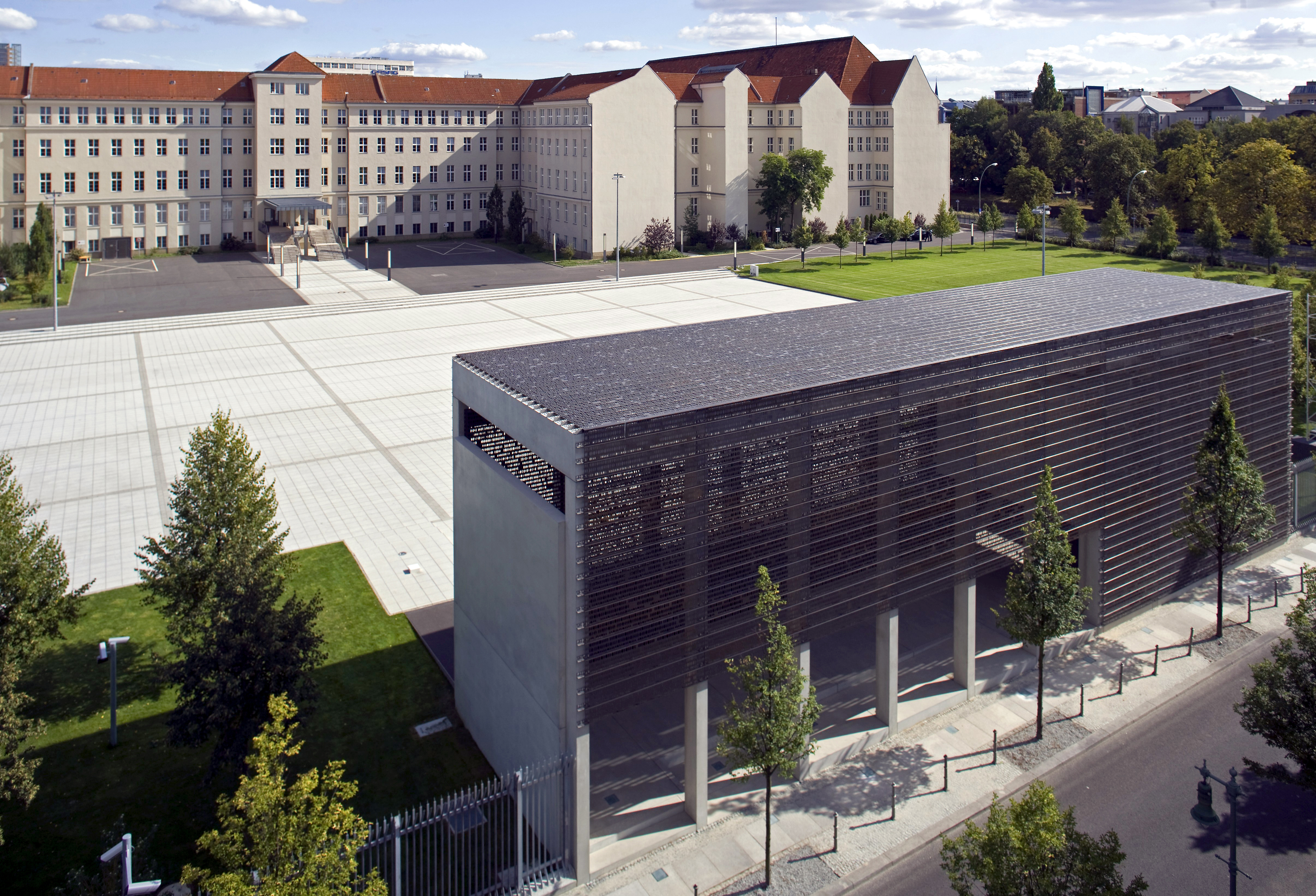
Bundeswehr Memorial, the Federal Ministry of Defence in the back

Following World War II, Tanzer joined the post-war Bundesluftwaffe. Hauptmann Tanzer and Oberleutnant Hans-Ludwig Seseke, were killed on 25 June 1960 when their Lockheed T-33A "EB+397" crashed in southwestern Mallorca. T-33 "EB+397" and T-33 "BD+843", piloted by United States Air Force Captain Charles S. Melton and Captain Roger P. Miller, both crashed into the cloud-covered mountains during an instrument flight rules (IFR) approach on Son Sant Joan Airport. All four pilots were killed in the incident. Tanzer and Seseke are listed on the Ehrenmal der Bundeswehr (Bundeswehr Memorial).

== Summary of career ==
=== Aerial victory claims ===
According to US historian David T. Zabecki, Tanzer was credited with 143 aerial victories. Spick also lists him with 143 aerial victories in 723 combat missions, 187 of which were ground attack missions. This figure includes 126 claims on the Eastern Front, and 17 on the Western Front, four of them being four-engined bombers. Mathews and Foreman, authors of Luftwaffe Aces — Biographies and Victory Claims, researched the German Federal Archives and state that he claimed at least 35 aerial victories, all of which claimed on the Eastern Front. The claim that he is attributed with 128 or even 143 aerial victories cannot be verified through the archives.

Victory claims were logged to a map-reference (PQ = Planquadrat), for example "PQ 47581". The Luftwaffe grid map (Jägermeldenetz) covered all of Europe, western Russia and North Africa and was composed of rectangles measuring 15 minutes of latitude by 30 minutes of longitude, an area of about 360 square miles (930 km^{2}). These sectors were then subdivided into 36 smaller units to give a location area 3 km × 4 km (1.9 mi × 2.5 mi) in size.

Chronicle of aerial victories
This and the ? (question mark) indicates information discrepancies listed by Prien, Stemmer, Rodeike, Bock, Mathews and Foreman.
Claim	Date	Time	Type	Location	Claim	Date	Time	Type	Location
– 12. Staffel of Jagdgeschwader 51 – Eastern Front — 1 May 1942 – 3 February 1943
1	2 August 1942	09:00	Il-2	PQ 47581; 10 km (6.2 mi) west of Rzhev	13	5 January 1943	09:18	Il-2	PQ 07792
2	5 August 1942	04:50	Pe-2	PQ 46442; 20 km (12 mi) east-southeast of Dugino	14	6 January 1943	08:30	MiG-3	PQ 07554
3	24 August 1942	07:40	Il-2	PQ 47572; 10 km (6.2 mi) west of Rzhev	15	6 January 1943	11:00	Pe-2	PQ 07813
? (Note: This claim is not listed by Prien, Stemmer, Rodeike and Bock.)	13 September 1942	17:35	Il-2	25 km (16 mi) northeast of Spas-Demensk	16	6 January 1943	11:58	Il-2	PQ 07761
4	3 December 1942	11:50	Il-2	20 km (12 mi) south-southwest of Tuleblja; 20 km (12 mi) south-southwest of Velikiye Luki	17	6 January 1943	12:20	Il-2	PQ 07732
5	8 December 1942	12:55	Il-2	10 km (6.2 mi) northwest of Velikiye Luki	18	7 January 1943	12:05	Pe-2	PQ 07584
6	8 December 1942	13:03	Il-2	PQ 07521	19	12 January 1943	13:18	MiG-3	PQ 07564
7	9 December 1942	08:15	Il-2	33 km (21 mi) southwest of Velikiye Luki	20	15 January 1943	11:25	Pe-2	PQ 07663
8	16 December 1942	08:03	MiG-3	25 km (16 mi) south of Velikiye Luki	21	16 January 1943	08:10	MiG-3	PQ 07582
9	16 December 1942	08:10	Il-2	35 km (22 mi) northwest of Velikiye Luki	22	16 January 1943	08:14	Pe-2	PQ 07553
10	16 December 1942	08:12	Il-2	35 km (22 mi) northwest of Velikiye Luki	23	16 January 1943	14:45	Il-2	PQ 07363
11	16 December 1942	11:40	Il-2	PQ 07791	24	26 January 1943	11:20	LaGG-3	PQ 07593
12	5 January 1943	09:15	Il-2	PQ 07762; 10 km (6.2 mi) northeast of Bely					
– 12. Staffel of Jagdgeschwader 51 – Eastern Front — 4 February – 6 May 1943
25	7 March 1943	14:40	MiG-3	PQ 35 Ost 36142	31	25 April 1943	11:47	Yak-1	PQ 35 Ost 63571; 20 km (12 mi) south-southeast of Trosna
26	10 April 1943	12:56	R-Z? (Note: According to Mathews and Foreman claimed as a Polikarpov R-5.)	PQ 35 Ost 46731; 15 km (9.3 mi) east of Vazma	32	6 May 1943	13:18	Il-2	PQ 35 Ost 63143; 15 km (9.3 mi) southwest of Oryol
27	10 April 1943	12:58	U-2	PQ 35 Ost 45122; 25 km (16 mi) south of Vazma	33	6 May 1943	13:19	Il-2	PQ 35 Ost 53264; 10 km (6.2 mi) south of Oryol
28	14 April 1943	09:10	Pe-2	PQ 35 Ost 42184; 10 km (6.2 mi) north of Kursk	34	6 May 1943	13:25	Il-2	PQ 35 Ost 53264; 15 km (9.3 mi) southwest of Oryol
29? (Note: This claim is not listed by Mathews and Foreman.)	14 April 1943	09:12	Yak-1	PQ 35 Ost 62182	35	6 May 1943	13:27	Il-2	PQ 35 Ost 63171; 15 km (9.3 mi) west of Zmiyovka
30	19 April 1943	08:52	R-5	PQ 35 Ost 45141; 30 km (19 mi) south-southwest of Vazma					

=== Awards ===
- Iron Cross (1939) 2nd and 1st Class
- Honor Goblet of the Luftwaffe on 15 February 1943 as Feldwebel and pilot
- German Cross in Gold on 24 June 1943 as Feldwebel in the 12./Jagdgeschwader 51
- Knight's Cross of the Iron Cross on 5 December 1943 as Oberfeldwebel and pilot of the 12./Jagdgeschwader 51 "Mölders"
