= Kalden =

Kalden is a German surname. Notable people with the surname include:

- Henry of Kalden (c. 1175 – after 1214), German ministerialis
- Peter Kalden (1923–1996), German fighter pilot
