= Orlyk (surname) =

Orlyk is a Ukrainian form of the common Slavic surname Orlik. Notable people with the surname include:

- Andriy Orlyk (born 1998), Ukrainian biathlete
- Grégoire Orlyk (1702–1759), French military commander
- Mariya Orlyk (1930–2022), Ukrainian politician
- Pylyp Orlyk (1672–1742), Zaporozhian Cossack starshyna and diplomat
