= Bernd Gallowitsch =

German World War II military aviator (1918–1983)

- Born: 23 February 1918; Vienna, Austria
- Died: 23 December 1983 (aged 65); Vienna, Austria
- Military career
- Allegiance: Federal State of Austria (to 1938); Nazi Germany
- Branch: Luftwaffe
- Service years: 1936–1945
- Rank: Major (major)
- Units: JG 51, JG 7, JG 1
- Conflicts: World War II; Eastern Front
- Awards: Knight's Cross of the Iron Cross
- Other work: airline pilot

Bernd Gallowitsch (23 February 1918 – 23 December 1983) was a German Luftwaffe ace and recipient of the Knight's Cross of the Iron Cross during World War II. The Knight's Cross of the Iron Cross, and its variants were the highest awards in the military and paramilitary forces of Nazi Germany during World War II. Gallowitsch was credited with 64 aerial victories, and the destruction of 23 tanks in 480 combat missions.

== Military career ==
Gallowitsch was born on 23 February 1918 in Vienna, the capital of Austria-Hungary. Following flight training, (Note: Flight training in the Luftwaffe progressed through the levels A1, A2 and B1, B2, referred to as A/B flight training. A training included theoretical and practical training in aerobatics, navigation, long-distance flights and dead-stick landings. The B courses included high-altitude flights, instrument flights, night landings and training to handle the aircraft in difficult situations.) Gallowitsch was posted to Kampfgruppe 100 (KGr. 100—100th Combat Group) in December 1939. He then received training as a fighter pilot and was posted to I. Gruppe (1st group) of Jagdgeschwader 77 (JG 77—77th Fighter Wing) in June 1940. On 7 September, the Luftwaffe launched Operation Loge during the Battle of Britain, a 65-day air offensive against London. That day, Gallowitsch claimed a Supermarine Spitfire fighter shot down. On 12 October, I. Gruppe of JG 77 flew three fighter-bomber missions to London. On the 10:30 to 11:40 mission, the Gruppe engaged in aerial combat with Hawker Hurricane fighters over the English coast near Hastings. During this encounter, Gallowitsch claimed one of the Hurricane fighters shot down.

On 21 November, I. Gruppe of JG 77 was redesignated and became the IV. Gruppe of Jagdgeschwader 51 (JG 51—51st Fighter Wing). Consequently, Gallowitsch became a member of 10. Staffel of JG 51. On 7 December, the Gruppe was withdrawn from the English Channel, relocating to Mannheim-Sandhofen Airfield for a period of rest and replenishment. When on 1 March 1941, Major Friedrich Beckh was appointed Gruppenkommandeur (group commander) of IV. Gruppe of JG 51, Gallowitsch was made his regular wingman. Gallowitsch had good eyesight and compensated for Beckh's inabilities. The assignment was based on a recommendation made by Prof. Dr. Paul Robert Skawran, a psychologist who had studied fighter pilot aptitudes and combat readiness with JG 51 at the time. On 9 February 1941, IV. Gruppe returned to France, then based at an airfield near Le Touquet and to Marquise on 16 April. There, Gallowitsch claimed a Spitfire fighter shot down on 6 May east of Dover and a Hurricane fighter on 21 May east of Deal. The Gruppe was withdrawn from the English Channel and relocated to Mönchengladbach on 7 June for a brief period of replenishment.

=== Operation Barbarossa ===
On 15 June, IV. Gruppe of JG 51 began transferring east and was located at an airfield named Krzewicze, located approximately 70 kilometers (43 miles) west of Brest-Litovsk. On 22 June, German forces launched Operation Barbarossa, the German invasion of the Soviet Union. JG 51 was subordinated to II. Fliegerkorps (2nd Air Corps), which as part of Luftflotte 2 (Air Fleet 2). JG 51 area of operation during Operation Barbarossa was over the right flank of Army Group Center in the combat area of the 2nd Panzer Group as well as the 4th Army. On 22 June, the first day of the invasion, Gallowitsch claimed his sixth aerial victory.

On 31 August, the commander of 12. Staffel, Hauptmann Heinrich Bär, was injured in combat. In consequence, Gallowitsch was transferred and temporarily placed in command of the Staffel. Gallowitsch commanded 12. Staffel until Bär returned in November.

Fighting in the Battles of Rzhev against the Kalinin Front in early 1942, II. and IV. Gruppen of JG 51 had become the most successful units of VIII. Fliegerkorps (8th Air Corps). By end-February, Feldwebel Franz-Josef Beerenbrock and Gallowitsch were the leading fighter pilots of IV. Gruppe. On 24 January 1942, Gallowitsch was awarded the Knight's Cross of the Iron Cross (Ritterkreuz des Eisernen Kreuzes) for 42 aerial victories claimed.

In 1945, he was assigned to Jagdgeschwader 1 "Oesau" (JG 1—1st Fighter Wing) flying the Heinkel He 162, a single-engine, jet-powered fighter aircraft. On 1 May, he was appointed Staffelkapitän (squadron leader) of 4. Staffel of JG 1, taking over command from Hauptmann Wolfgang Ludewig.

== Later life ==
Following World War II, Gallowitsch worked as a pilot for Austrian Airlines. On 3 June 1966, the front landing gear of the Vickers Viscount Franz Schubert malfunctioned during landing at Salzburg Airport, consequently the propellers touched the ground. Due to Gallowitsch action, a fatal accident was prevented. Gallowitsch died on 28 December 1983 at the age of 65 in Vienna, Austria.

== Summary of career ==
=== Aerial victory claims ===
According to US historian David T. Zabecki, Gallowitsch was credited with 64 aerial victories. Mathews and Foreman, authors of Luftwaffe Aces – Biographies and Victory Claims, researched the German Federal Archives and found records for 48 aerial victory claims plus two further unconfirmed clams. With the exception of four aerial victories claimed over the Western Allies, all other aerial victories were claimed on the Eastern Front.

Chronicle of aerial victories
This and the ? (question mark) indicates information discrepancies listed by Prien, Stemmer, Rodeike, Bock, Mathews and Foreman.
Claim	Date	Time	Type	Location	Claim	Date	Time	Type	Location
– 1. Staffel of Jagdgeschwader 77 – Over England and on the English Channel — 25 August – 20 November 1940
1	7 September 1940	—	Spitfire						
According to Prien, Stemmer, Rodeike and Bock, Gallowitsch claimed one further aerial victory in the timeframe 7 September to 12 October 1940. In this timeframe, seven claims are listed with no-name, one which was attributed to Gallowitsch. This claim is not listed by Mathews and Foreman.
3	12 October 1940	11:22	Hurricane						
– 10. Staffel of Jagdgeschwader 51 – Over England and on the English Channel — 21 November 1940 – 7 June 1941
4	6 May 1941	14:15	Spitfire	5 km (3.1 mi) east of Dover	5	21 May 1941	18:05	Hurricane	15 km (9.3 mi) east of Deal
– 10. Staffel of Jagdgeschwader 51 – Operation Barbarossa — 22 June – August 1941
6	22 June 1941	07:10	I-153	west of Kobryn	14	4 July 1941	15:08	SB-2	
7	24 June 1941	09:28	DB-3		15	26 July 1941	10:40	I-153	
8	29 June 1941	17:12	DB-3		16	31 July 1941	09:45	R-3? (Note: According to Mathews and Foreman claimed as a Ilyushin Il-2.)	
9	29 June 1941	17:23	DB-3		17	1 August 1941	14:20	SB-2	
10	30 June 1941	06:25	DB-3		18	1 August 1941	14:23	SB-2	
11	30 June 1941	12:00	SB-2		19	2 August 1941	12:04	I-16	10 km (6.2 mi) north of Yelnya
12	3 July 1941	18:20	SB-2		20	2 August 1941	12:05	I-61 (MiG-3)	10 km (6.2 mi) north of Yelnya
13	3 July 1941	18:23	SB-2		21	4 August 1941	12:20	R-3?	
– Stab of Jagdgeschwader 51 – Operation Barbarossa — August – September 1941
22	11 August 1941	09:40	I-61 (MiG-3)		26	6 September 1941	12:25	attack aircraft	
23	15 August 1941	10:45	I-61 (MiG-3)		27? (Note: According to Mathews and Foreman this claim is unconfirmed.)	10 September 1941	—	I-61 (MiG-3)	
24	1 September 1941	16:13	R-3		28?	16 September 1941	—	SB-2	
25	6 September 1941	10:00	I-153						
– 12. Staffel of Jagdgeschwader 51 – Operation Barbarossa — October – 5 December 1941
29	10 October 1941	14:28	I-15		37	4 November 1941	15:10	I-15	
30	10 October 1941	14:30	I-15		38	5 November 1941	07:20	R-3?	
31	11 October 1941	11:15	I-61 (MiG-3)		39	13 November 1941	10:45	I-61 (MiG-3)	
32	12 October 1941	12:40	PS-84		40	14 November 1941	09:50	R-3?	
33	12 October 1941	15:50	R-3	20 km (12 mi) northeast of Mogilev	41	15 November 1941	08:40	Ar-2	
34	24 October 1941	11:20	DB-3		42	15 November 1941	15:05	I-61 (MiG-3)	
35	4 November 1941	08:57	R-3?		43	18 November 1941	14:45	I-26 (Yak-1)	
36	4 November 1941	09:00	R-3?	15 km (9.3 mi) northeast of Naro-Fominsk	44	2 December 1941	11:21	I-301 (LaGG-3)	southwest of Aprelevka
– 12. Staffel of Jagdgeschwader 51 – Operation Barbarossa — 6 December 1941 – 30 April 1942
45	15 December 1941	14:38	LaGG-3						

=== Awards ===
- Iron Cross (1939) 2nd and 1st Class
- Honour Goblet of the Luftwaffe on 15 September 1941 as Leutnant in a Jagdgeschwader
- Knight's Cross of the Iron Cross on 24 January 1942 as Leutnant and pilot in the 12./Jagdgeschwader 51 "Mölders"
