= 1st Fighter Division (Germany) =

1st Fighter Division (1. Jagd-Division) was one of the primary divisions of the German Luftwaffe in World War II. It was formed on 1 May 1942 in Deelen from Stab/1. Nachtjagd-Division and redesignated 3. Jagd-Division on 15 September 1943. It was immediately reformed on 15 September 1943 in Döberitz from the 4. Jagd-Division.

The Division was subordinated to XII. Fliegerkorps (May 1942 – September 1943), I. Jagdkorps (September 1943 – January 1945) and IX (J) Fliegerkorps (January 1945 – May 1945).

== Commanding officers ==
- Generalleutnant Kurt-Bertram von Döring, 1 May 1942 – 15 September 1943
- Oberst Günther Lützow, 15 September 1943 – 23 March 1944
- Oberst Hajo Herrmann, 23 March 1944 – 1 September 1944
- Generalleutnant Kurt Kleinrath, 1 September 1944 – 8 December 1944
- Oberst Heinrich Wittmer, December 1944 – 5 April 1945
- Generalmajor Walter Grabmann, 5 April 1945 – 29 April 1945
- Oberst Karl-Gottfried Nordmann, April 1945 – May 1945

== Subordinated units ==
- From 1 May 1942 to 8 May 1945
  - LR0: Luftnachrichten-Regiment 201
  - LR1:Luftnachrichten-Regiment 211
  - LR2:Luftnachrichten-Regiment 221
  - LR3:Luftnachrichten-Regiment 231
- From 1 September 1943 to 31 January 1945
  - JFO: Jagdfliegerführer Ostpreussen
  - JDB: Jagdfliegerführer Schlesien

== See also ==
- Luftwaffe Organisation
