= 3rd Fighter Division (Germany) =

German military unit

3rd Fighter Division (3. Jagd Division) was one of the primary divisions of the German Luftwaffe in World War II. It was formed 1 May 1942 in Metz. The Division was redesignated 4. Jagd-Division on 15 September 1943 and reformed 15 September 1943 in Deelen from 1. Jagd Division.

== Commanding officers ==
- Generalleutnant Werner Junck (1 May 1942 - 15 September 1943)
- Generalleutnant Kurt-Bertram von Döring (15 September 1943 - 1 October 1943)
- Oberst Kurt Hentschel (1 October 1943 - 15 October 1943) (Acting)
- Generalleutnant Kurt-Bertram von Döring (15 October 1943 - 9 November 1943)
- Generalmajor Walter Grabmann (11 November 1943 - 4 April 1945)

== See also ==
- Luftwaffe Organisation
