= Karl-Gottfried Nordmann =

German World War II military aviator (1915–1982)

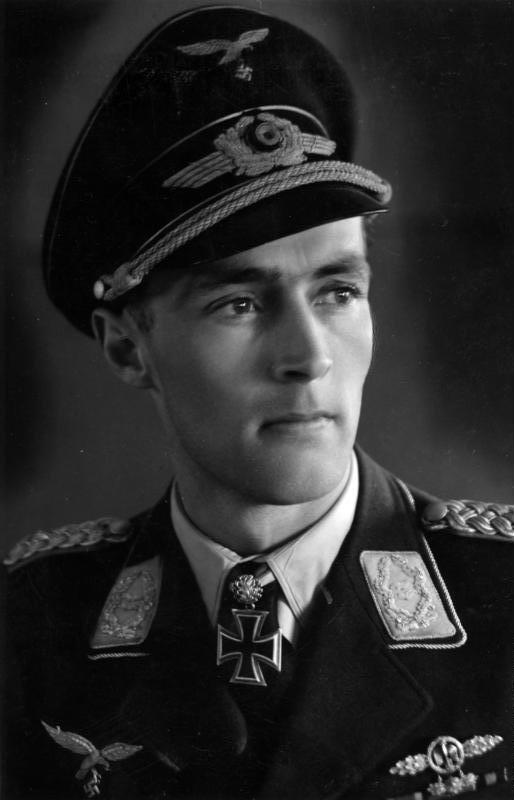
- Nordmann as a Luftwaffe officer in 1943

President of Mercedes-Benz of North America and Canada
- In office January 1971 – January 1981
- Preceded by: Heinz Hoppe
- Succeeded by: Walter Bodack

Inspector of the Day Fighters, East
- In office 9 February 1945 – 8 May 1945
- Preceded by: Hannes Trautloft
- Succeeded by: Office abolished

Personal details
- Born: 22 November 1915 Gießen, Germany
- Died: 22 July 1982 (aged 66) Greenwich, Connecticut, USA

Military service
- Allegiance: Nazi Germany
- Branch/service: Luftwaffe
- Years of service: 1936–45
- Rank: Oberst (Colonel)
- Unit: JG 51
- Commands: JG 51; 1st Fighter Division
- Battles/wars: See battles World War II: Invasion of Poland; Battle of France; Operation Barbarossa; Eastern Front
- Awards: Knight's Cross of the Iron Cross with Oak Leaves

Karl-Gottfried "Karlfried" Nordmann (22 November 1915 – 22 July 1982) was a German Luftwaffe pilot during World War II and, after the war, a president of Mercedes-Benz in North America. As a fighter ace he was credited with 78 enemy aircraft shot down in over 800 combat missions. He claimed the majority of his victories over the Eastern Front, with one during the Invasion of Poland and eight during the Battle of France and Britain.

Born in Giessen, Nordmann volunteered for military service in the Luftwaffe of the Third Reich in 1936. Following flight training, he was posted to Jagdgeschwader 132 (JG 132—132nd Fighter Wing) in October 1938. After a series of redesignations his unit was subordinated to Jagdgeschwader 51 (JG 51—51st Fighter Wing). He fought in the aerial battles over Poland, France and Britain, claiming nine victories. Following the German invasion of the Soviet Union in Operation Barbarossa, he was appointed Gruppenkommandeur (group commander) of the IV. Gruppe (4th Group) of JG 51. He was awarded the Knight's Cross of the Iron Cross on 1 August 1941 following his 31st aerial victory and received the Knight's Cross of the Iron Cross with Oak Leaves on 16 September 1941 after 59 victories. The Oak Leaves grades to the Knight's Cross was Germany's highest military decoration at the time of its presentation to Nordmann. (Note: Until late September 1941, the Knight's Cross of the Iron Cross with Oak Leaves was second only to the Grand Cross of the Iron Cross (Großkreuz des Eisernen Kreuzes), which was awarded only to senior commanders for winning a major battle or campaign, in the military order of the Third Reich. The Knight's Cross of the Iron Cross with Oak Leaves as highest military order was officially surpassed on 28 September 1941 by the Knight's Cross of the Iron Cross with Oak Leaves and Swords, however the first presentation of the Swords to Adolf Galland was made prior to this date on 21 June 1941.)

Nordmann was appointed Geschwaderkommodore (Wing Commander) of JG 51, which he led for two years, on 10 April 1942. Injuries sustained in a midair collision on 17 January 1943 grounded him from further combat flying. He surrendered command of JG 51 on 1 April 1944 and was appointed Jagdfliegerführer Ostpreussen (fighter leader Eastern Prussia). Nordmann then served further fighter command positions with Jagdabschnittsführer 6 (leader of the 6th fighter sector) and the 1st Fighter Division, a position he held until the end of World War II. Following World War II, Nordmann joined Mercedes-Benz in sales. He worked as the president of Mercedes-Benz in North America and Canada from 1971 until shortly before his death in 1982.

== Early life and career ==
Nordmann was born on 22 November 1915 in Giessen, at the time in the Grand Duchy of Hesse of the German Empire. He was the son of a doctor and joined the military service of the Luftwaffe on 6 April 1936 as a Fahnenjunker (officer cadet). Nordmann was promoted to Leutnant (Second Lieutenant) on 1 January 1938 and served with 1. Staffel of Kampfgeschwader 253 from 1 March to 30 April 1938. He was then posted to the Jagdfliegerschule (Fighter Pilot School) at Werneuchen, under the command of Oberst (Colonel) Theodor Osterkamp. (Note: Flight training in the Luftwaffe progressed through the levels A1, A2 and B1, B2, referred to as A/B flight training. A training included theoretical and practical training in aerobatics, navigation, long-distance flights and dead-stick landings. The B courses included high-altitude flights, instrument flights, night landings and training to handle the aircraft in difficult situations.) Since July 1938, he served as a Staffeloffizier (squadron officer) with the Stab of I. Gruppe (1st group) of Jagdgeschwader 77 (JG 77—77th Fighter Wing), which later became IV./Jagdgeschwader 51 (JG 51—51st Fighter Wing).

This unit underwent a series of redesignations which started with VI./Jagdgeschwader 132 (JG 132—132nd Fighter Wing), was renamed on 2 November 1938 to I./Jagdgeschwader 331 (JG 331—331st Fighter Wing). (Note: For an explanation of Luftwaffe unit designations, see Organisation of the Luftwaffe during World War II.) While based at Breslau-Schöngarten (currently called Wrocław Airport), it was redesignated again, this time to I./JG 77 on 1 May 1939, which was redesignated to IV./JG 51 on 21 November 1940.

== World War II ==
World War II in Europe began on Friday 1 September 1939 when German forces invaded Poland. Nordmann claimed his first aerial victory when he shot down a Polish PZL.43 on 3 September 1939. Nordmann achieved his next victory during the Battle of France and seven more in the Battle of Britain. He was appointed Staffelkapitän (squadron leader) of the 12. Staffel (12th squadron) of Jagdgeschwader 51 (JG 51—51st Fighter Wing) on 1 March 1940, replacing Oberleutnant (First Lieutenant) Erwin Neuerburg who became Staffelkapitän of 7. Staffel of Jagdgeschwader 3 (JG 3—3rd Fighter Wing). (Note: According to Prien, Stemmer, Rodeike and Bock, Nordmann succeeded Oberleutnant Rudolf Resch as Staffelkapitän of 3. Staffel of JG 77 (later 12. Staffel of JG 51) on 5 October 1940.) In this function, he was promoted to Oberleutnant on 1 April 1940. Nordmann was victorious over two Royal Air Force (RAF) Supermarine Spitfires on 17 October 1940 and achieved his ninth aerial victory on 6 May 1941. On 21 November 1940, I. Gruppe of JG 77 was officially redesignated and became IV. Gruppe of JG 51.

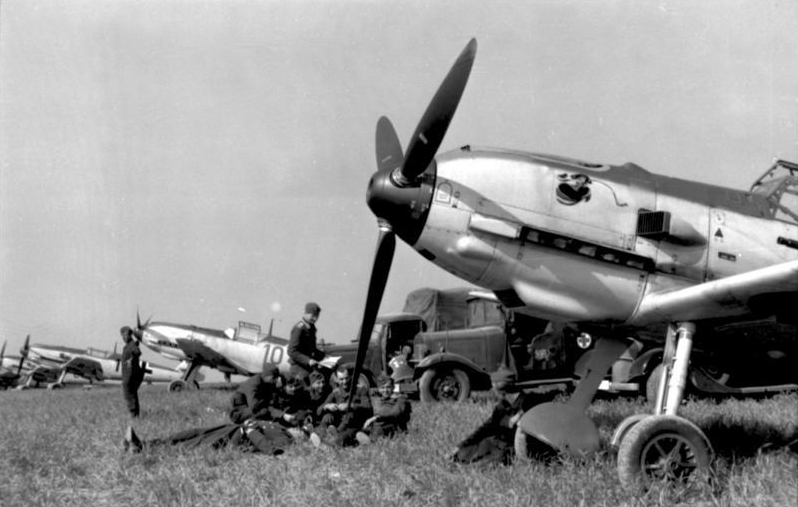
Bf 109 of IV./JG 51 in France, August 1940

=== Operation Barbarossa ===
On 15 June, IV. Gruppe of JG 51 began transferring east and was located at an airfield named Krzewicze, located approximately 70 kilometers (43 miles) west of Brest-Litovsk. On 22 June, German forces launched Operation Barbarossa, the German invasion of the Soviet Union. JG 51 was subordinated to II. Fliegerkorps (2nd Air Corps), which as part of Luftflotte 2 (Air Fleet 2). JG 51 area of operation during Operation Barbarossa was over the right flank of Army Group Center in the combat area of the 2nd Panzer Group as well as the 4th Army.

On 20 July 1941 Nordmann was appointed to command IV./JG 51, succeeding Major Friedrich Beckh who was selected to command JG 51 as Geschwaderkommodore (Wing Commander). Command of the 12. Staffel was passed on to Oberleutnant Heinrich Bär. Less than two weeks later, on 1 August 1941 Nordmann was awarded the Knight's Cross of the Iron Cross (Ritterkreuz des Eisernen Kreuzes) after a total of 31 victories which was presented to him by General der Flieger Bruno Loerzer. Unteroffizier (Sergeant) Franz-Josef Beerenbrock flew as Nordmann's Rottenflieger (wing man) around this time. Nordmann achieved his 40th victory in total on 16 August and his 50th on 28 August. Only three weeks later he was awarded the Knight's Cross of the Iron Cross with Oak Leaves (Ritterkreuz des Eisernen Kreuzes mit Eichenlaub) on 16 September 1941 after 59 victories which was presented by Adolf Hitler. Three days later, on 19 September, he was promoted to Hauptmann (captain). On 10 April 1942, Nordmann took over command of JG 51 as Geschwaderkommodore from Beckh who was transferred to the Reich Air Ministry.

Nordmann was promoted to Major (major) on 18 June 1942. On 26 June 1942 Nordmann crashed his Messerschmitt Bf 109 F-2 (Werknummer 12825—factory number). The aircraft flipped during the landing and Nordmann suffered a basilar fractured skull, an injury typical of high-speed crashes. Although he flew again shortly after the crash his injury required hospitalization in August. Nordmann, who had been assisted by Hauptmann Joachim Müncheberg as a Geschwaderkommodore in training, temporarily replaced him during his absence. On 17 January 1943 Nordmann's Focke-Wulf Fw 190 was involved in a midair collision with Hauptmann Rudolf Busch, Gruppenkommandeur of I./JG 51. Busch was killed and Nordmann, severely injured, did not fly operationally again. In total, Nordmann claimed 78 aerial victories, 69 of which on the Eastern Front, flying over 800 combat missions. Under his leadership JG 51 reported the 4,000th aerial victory on 16 December 1942, the 5,000th victory on 2 June 1943, the 6,000th victory on 27 July 1943 and the 7,000th victory on 15 September 1943.

Nordmann, who had been promoted to Oberstleutnant (lieutenant colonel) on 1 August 1943, was appointed Jagdfliegerführer Ostpreussen on 1 April 1944. This command was also later referred to as Jagdabschnittsführer 6 (leader of the 6th fighter sector), while subordinated to the Luftflotte 6 (6th Air Fleet). On 11 November, Reichsmarschall (Marshal of the Realm) Hermann Göring, in his role as commander-in-chief of the Luftwaffe, organized a meeting of high-ranking Luftwaffe officers, including Nordmann. The meeting, also referred to as the "Areopag" was held at the Luftkriegsakademie (air war academy) at Berlin-Gatow. This Luftwaffe version of the Greek Areopagus—a court of justice—aimed at finding solutions to the deteriorating air war situation over Germany. He was appointed Inspekteur der Tagjäger Ost (Inspector of Fighter Operations East) on 4 January 1945 and on 30 January 1945 promoted to Oberst (Colonel). Just prior to the end of the war, on 4 April 1945, he took over command of the 1st Fighter Division until the end of the war.

== Later life and business career ==
After World War II, Nordmann joined Mercedes-Benz in 1950, initially working in sales. He later became head of the sales department and, in 1968, head of worldwide services. In January 1971 he was appointed president of Mercedes-Benz in North America and Canada, retiring in January 1981. Despite his retirement, he continued to hold a position as company director. During his tenure with Mercedes, Nordmann was an early mentor of Jürgen Schrempp, who later became the chief executive officer of Daimler AG. Under Nordmann's leadership, Mercedes sales in the United States increased from 30,000 cars in 1970 to 43,600 cars in 1972, a 0.4% U.S. market share. To further expand the market presence in North America, Mercedes in 1976 opened a facility in Jacksonville, Florida. In 1977 Daimler bought the Euclid Company of Ohio and Freightliner Trucks in 1981.

In 1981 Nordmann attended an aviation symposium of the International Order of Characters (IOC) held in Stamford, Connecticut. The symposium panel was made up of four former World War II fighter pilots. In addition to Nordmann, the panel included the former RAF pilots, Sir Douglas Bader and Robert Stanford Tuck, and the former United States Army Air Forces pilot Robert S. Johnson.

He died at his home on 22 July 1982 in Greenwich, Connecticut, USA. Nordmann's wife was named Tina. They had a son, Eric, and a daughter, Corinne.

== Summary of career ==
=== Aerial victory claims ===
According to US historian David T. Zabecki, Nordmann was credited with 78 aerial victories. Obermaier also lists him with 78 aerial victories, 69 of which on the Eastern Front, achieved in flying over 800 combat missions. Mathews and Foreman, authors of Luftwaffe Aces — Biographies and Victory Claims, researched the German Federal Archives and found records for 75 aerial victory claims, plus two further unconfirmed claims. This number includes 1 claim over Poland, 8 on the Western Front, and 66 on the Eastern Front.

Victory claims were logged to a map-reference (PQ = Planquadrat), for example "PQ 37432". The Luftwaffe grid map covered all of Europe, western Russia and North Africa and was composed of rectangles measuring 15 minutes of latitude by 30 minutes of longitude, an area of about 360 square miles (930 km^{2}). These sectors were then subdivided into 36 smaller units to give a location area 3x4km in size.

Chronicle of aerial victories
This and the – (dash) indicates unconfirmed aerial victory claims for which Nordmann did not receive credit. This and the ! (exclamation mark) indicates those aerial victories listed by Prien, Stemmer, Rodeike and Bock. This and the # (hash mark) indicates those aerial victories listed by Mathews and Foreman.
Claim!	Claim#	Date	Time	Type	Location	Unit	Claim!	Claim#	Date	Time	Type	Location	Unit
– Claims with Jagdgeschwader 77 in Poland – September 1939
1	1	3 September 1939	17.45	PZL.43	east of Chałupy	2./JG 77							
– Claims with Jagdgeschwader 77 on the Western Front – Battle of France — 10–23 May 1940
2	2	19 May 1940	17:50	Hurricane	northeast of Cambrai	Stab I./JG 77							
– Claims with Jagdgeschwader 77 against England – June – November 1940
3	3	31 August 1940	14:25	Hurricane	south of Brentwood	3./JG 77	6	6	10 October 1940	18:45	Blenheim	south of Folkestone	3./JG 77
4	4	31 August 1940	18:15	Spitfire	northeast of Tunbridge Wells	3./JG 77	7	7	17 October 1940	17:55	Hurricane	south of Tonbridge	3./JG 77
5	5	7 September 1940	18:25	Spitfire	Cranbrook	3./JG 77	8	8	17 October 1940	17:57	Hurricane	south of Tunbridge Wells	3./JG 77
– Claims with Jagdgeschwader 51 on the Channel Front – November 1940 – March 1941
9	9	6 May 1941	13:55	Spitfire	25 km (16 mi) northwest of Calais	12./JG 51							
– Claims with Jagdgeschwader 51 on the Eastern Front – Operation Barbarossa — 22 June – 5 December 1941
10	10	22 June 1941	10:10	I-153	west of Kobryn	12./JG 51	40	40	16 August 1941	19:05	Pe-2	northwest of Yelnya	Stab IV./JG 51
11	11	22 June 1941	11:30	SB-2	Drohiczyn nad Bugiem	12./JG 51	41	41	18 August 1941	17:15	I-15	north of Baltutino	Stab IV./JG 51
12	12	22 June 1941	11:33	SB-2	Drohiczyn nad Bugiem	12./JG 51	42	42	22 August 1941	09:00	I-16	north of Shidritztroje	Stab IV./JG 51
13	13	22 June 1941	11:35	SB-2		12./JG 51	43	43	25 August 1941	17:55	DB-3	east of Ponurowka	Stab IV./JG 51
14	14	24 June 1941	08:50	SB-2	east of Pruzhany	12./JG 51	44		25 August 1941	18:00	DB-3	southeast of Ponurowka	Stab IV./JG 51
15	15	28 June 1941	16:35	DB-3	west of Solon	12./JG 51	45	44	25 August 1941	18:03	DB-3	south of Ponurowka	Stab IV./JG 51
16	16	28 June 1941	18:35	DB-3	southwest of Bobruisk	12./JG 51	46	45	26 August 1941	14:08	R-3	south of Sechtschinskaja	Stab IV./JG 51
17	17	30 June 1941	10:56	DB-3	10 km (6.2 mi) west of Bobruisk	12./JG 51	47	46	27 August 1941	09:05	I-18	southeast of Novgorod	Stab IV./JG 51
18	18	30 June 1941	13:15	I-16	Himy	12./JG 51	48	47	27 August 1941	09:07	I-18	southeast of Novgorod	Stab IV./JG 51
19	19	30 June 1941	13:30	R-10	south of Bobruisk	12./JG 51	49	48	27 August 1941	14:05	Pe-2	east of Novgorod	Stab IV./JG 51
20	20	30 June 1941	18:55	SB-2	Bobruisk	12./JG 51	50	49	28 August 1941	18:01	Pe-2	southeast of Novgorod	Stab IV./JG 51
21	21	2 July 1941	18:40	DB-3	Welgatitschij	12./JG 51	51	50	30 August 1941	11:55	DB-3	northwest of Surb	Stab IV./JG 51
22	22	3 July 1941	19:52	DB-3	southeast Borissow	12./JG 51	52	51	30 August 1941	17:05	DB-3	east of Novgorod	Stab IV./JG 51
23	23	4 July 1941	14:28	SB-2	east of Borissow	12./JG 51	53	52	3 September 1941	16:32	SB-3	south of Sobyz	Stab IV./JG 51
24	23	5 July 1941	06:35	DB-3	east of Borissow	12./JG 51	54	53	9 September 1941	11:03	Pe-2	Tinizia	Stab IV./JG 51
25	25	5 July 1941	15:01	I-16	west of Bobruisk	12./JG 51	55	54	9 September 1941	11:05	Pe-2	Mutier	Stab IV./JG 51
26	26	7 July 1941	14:45	I-153	Talachyn	12./JG 51	56	55	9 September 1941	14:45	DB-3	west of Kostobobr	Stab IV./JG 51
27	27	11 July 1941	05:42	Pe-2	north of Orscha	12./JG 51	57	56	10 September 1941	11:02	R-3	southeast of Schostka	Stab IV./JG 51
28	28	14 July 1941	11:05	DB-3	east of Kopys	12./JG 51	58	57	10 September 1941	11:15	R-3	10 km (6.2 mi) west of Schostka	Stab IV./JG 51
29	29	16 July 1941	12:03	DB-3	south of Smolensk	12./JG 51	59	58	16 September 1941	17:25	I-18	southeast of Baltutino	Stab IV./JG 51
30	30	23 July 1941	12:59	Pe-2	south of Schatalowka	Stab IV./JG 51	60	59	26 September 1941	16:00	I-18	northeast of Schatalowka	Stab IV./JG 51
31	31	28 July 1941	17:55	DB-3	north of Vyshny Volochyok	Stab IV./JG 51	61	60	7 October 1941	13:28	Pe-2	northeast of Yukhnov	Stab IV./JG 51
32	32	2 August 1941	17:14	R-5	east of Kondratowka	Stab IV./JG 51	62	61	7 October 1941	13:32	Pe-2	northeast of Yukhnov	Stab IV./JG 51
33	33	2 August 1941	19:33	R-3	north of Korbojetz	Stab IV./JG 51	63	62	18 October 1941	10:02	DB-3	east of Medyn	Stab IV./JG 51
34	34	2 August 1941	19:35	R-5	Pronius	Stab IV./JG 51	64	63	25 October 1941	10:15	DC-3	northeast of Malojaroslawetz	Stab IV./JG 51
35	35	2 August 1941	19:41	P-3	15 km (9.3 mi) northeast of Korbojetz	Stab IV./JG 51	65	64	25 October 1941	15:53	I-16	northeast of Malojaroslawetz	Stab IV./JG 51
36	36	9 August 1941	12:26	Pe-2	east of Yelnya	Stab IV./JG 51	66	65	29 October 1941	09:24	I-16	northeast of Russa	Stab IV./JG 51
37	37	9 August 1941	14:03	Pe-2	northwest of Yelnya	Stab IV./JG 51	67	66	4 November 1941	15:02	R-3	northwest of Naro-Fominsk	Stab IV./JG 51
38	38	9 August 1941	14:04	Pe-2	Yelnya	Stab IV./JG 51	68	67	5 November 1941	07:01	Pe-2	north of Schalkowka	Stab IV./JG 51
39	39	15 August 1941	15:23	I-18	northeast of Yelnya	Stab IV./JG 51	69	68	5 November 1941	11:08	Pe-2	south of Puschkino	Stab IV./JG 51
– Claims with Jagdgeschwader 51 on the Eastern Front – Winter War — 6 December 1941 – 30 April 1942
	—	14 December 1941	—	Pe-2		Stab IV./JG 51	71	70	19 January 1942	13:55	DB-3	northeast of Medyn	Stab IV./JG 51
70	69	8 January 1942	14:05	Pe-2	northeast of Medyn	Stab IV./JG 51							
– Claims with the Stab of Jagdgeschwader 51 on the Eastern Front – 1 May 1942 – 3 February 1943
—	—	24 May 1942	—	Il-2		Stab JG 51	74	73	2 August 1942	13:20	Pe-2	PQ 37432/Jeltzy	Stab JG 51
72	71	9 June 1942	19:05	Pe-2	Spas-Demensk	Stab JG 51	75	74	4 August 1942	10:55	Il-2	PQ 47853/east of Zubtsov	Stab JG 51
73	72	12 June 1942	12:10	Il-2	northeast of Karachev	Stab JG 51	76	75	16 December 1942	12:53	Il-2	PQ 26254/Ryschkowo	Stab JG 51

=== Awards ===
- Iron Cross (1939)
  - 2nd Class (8 October 1939)
  - 1st Class (5 January 1940)
- Honour Goblet of the Luftwaffe (Ehrenpokal der Luftwaffe) (28 July 1941)
- Front Flying Clasp of the Luftwaffe for fighter pilots in gold with pennant (Note: The image File:Bundesarchiv Bild 183-2008-0704-500, Smolensk, Karl Gottfried Nordmann.jpg shows Nordmann wearing the Front Flying Clasp of the Luftwaffe for fighter pilots in gold with pennant above his left uniform pocket.)
- Knight's Cross of the Iron Cross with Oak Leaves
  - Knight's Cross on 1 August 1941 as Oberleutnant and Staffelkapitän of the 12./Jagdgeschwader 51
  - 35th Oak Leaves on 16 September 1941 as Oberleutnant and Staffelkapitän of the 12./Jagdgeschwader 51

=== Dates of rank ===
6 April 1936:	Fahnenjunker (Officer Cadet)
1 January 1938:	Leutnant (Second Lieutenant)
1 April 1940:	Oberleutnant (First Lieutenant)
19 September 1941:	Hauptmann (Captain)
18 June 1942:	Major (Major)
1 August 1943:	Oberstleutnant (Lieutenant Colonel)
30 January 1945:	Oberst (Colonel)

== Notes ==
Military offices
Preceded by Oberstleutnant Friedrich Beckh	Commander of Jagdgeschwader 51 Mölders; 10 April 1942 – 30 March 1944	Succeeded by Major Fritz Losigkeit
Preceded by unknown	Commander of Jagdfliegerführer Ostpreussen; 1 April 1944 – 1 October 1944	Succeeded by Hauptmann Egbert Belau
Preceded by Generalmajor Walter Grabmann	Commander of 1st Fighter Division; April 1945 – 8 May 1945	Succeeded by none
Business positions
Preceded by Heinz Hoppe	President of Mercedes-Benz of North America; January 1971 – January 1981	Succeeded by Walter Bodack
