= Deelen Air Base =

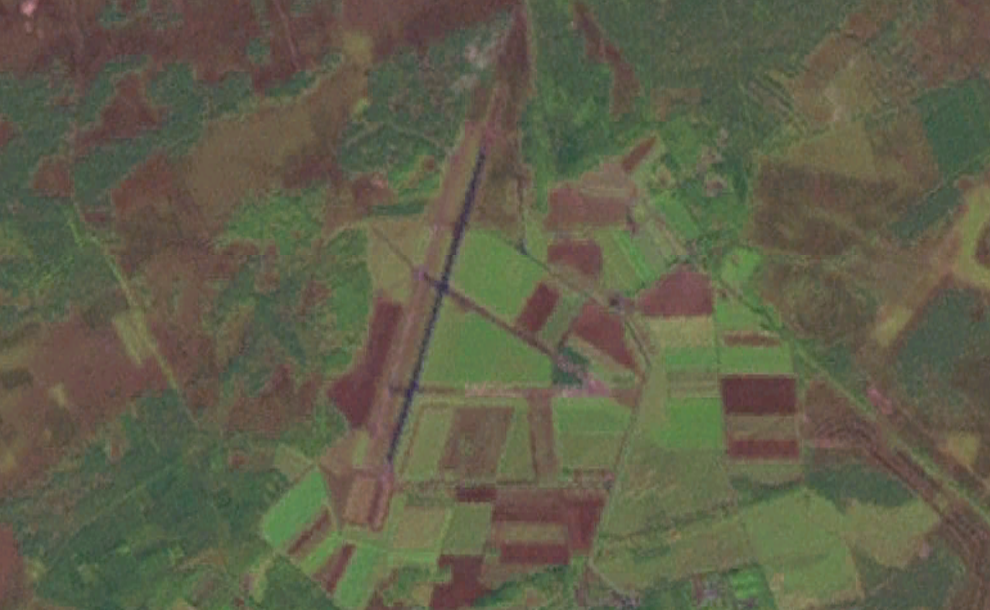
- IATA: QAR; ICAO: EHDL

Summary
- Airport type: Military
- Operator: Royal Netherlands Air and Space Force
- Location: Deelen
- Elevation AMSL: 158 ft (48 m)
- Coordinates: 52°03′33″N 005°52′38″E
- Interactive map of Deelen Air Base

Runways
Direction	Length		Surface
Direction	ft	m	Surface
02/20	3,431	1,046	Concrete/asphalt

Deelen Air Base (Dutch: Luchtmachtbasis Deelen or Vliegbasis Deelen) is a military air base in the Netherlands in the province of Gelderland. Though once an active air base, it is now mostly used as a helicopter training site. Being one of the oldest airports in the Netherlands, many buildings on the airfield are now listed as monuments.

== History ==
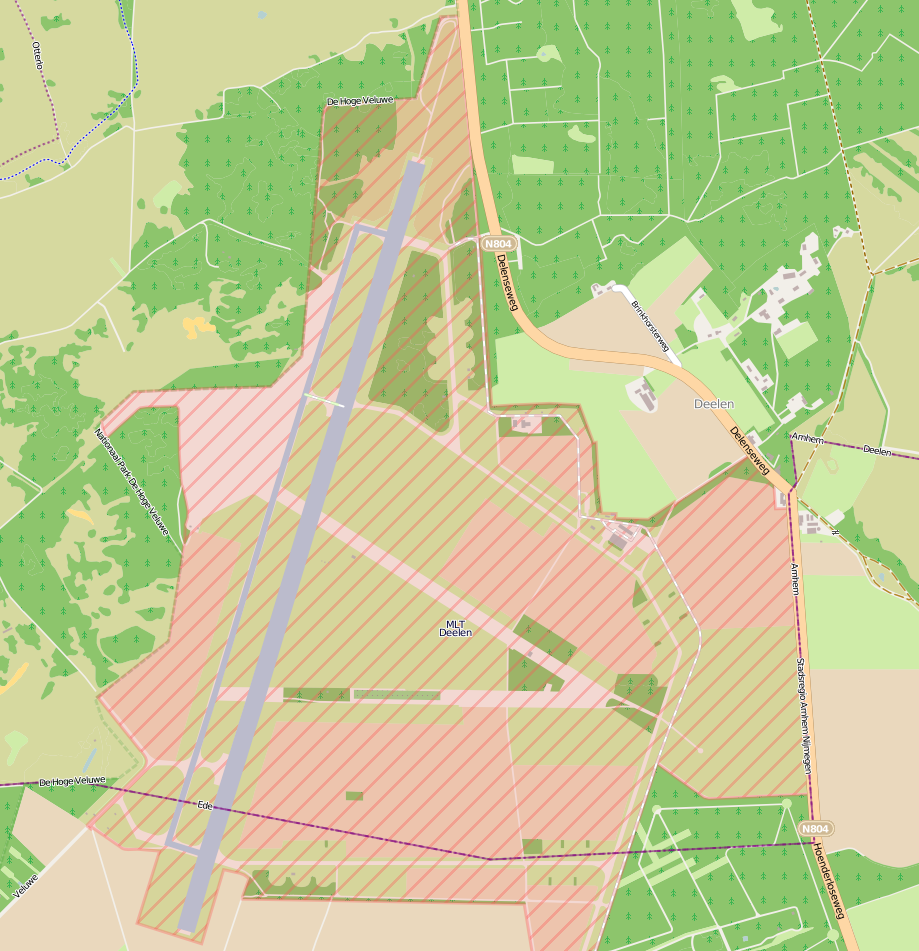
Map of Deelen; the airbase is the area under the red hatching

Deelen Air Base was founded in 1913 as a base for border patrol missions. When the Netherlands surrendered to Germany in World War II, the Luftwaffe started using the field, significantly expanding and upgrading the base. The Focke-Wulf Fw 190, Messerschmitt Bf 110 and Junkers Ju 88 were operated from the airfield, and anti-aircraft guns were installed. A railway from the nearby town of Wolfheze was constructed, initially to facilitate the transport of building materials for a Luftwaffe command bunker and later to supply the base with munitions. It was the headquarters of 1. Jagd Division from May 1942, later re-designated 3. Jagd Division.

In 1944 the airfield was extensively bombed by Allied forces in preparation for the Battle of Arnhem, and flying activity from the base was suspended by the Germans. The base was reduced to an auxiliary airfield and turned into a depot for V-1 flying bombs. After the war, the Dutch military used Deelen as a storage facility until 1950. In 1950, the decision was made to restore Deelen back to an operational air base, and from 1957 to 1963 was the base for the Royal Netherlands Air Force Republic RF-84F Thunderflash photo reconnaissance aircraft. Between 1964 and 1995 the field was used by various lighter aircraft, such as the de Havilland Canada DHC-2 Beaver, Piper J-3, Hiller OH-23 Raven, Aérospatiale Alouette II / Alouette III and Bölkow 105. In June 1995 Deelen was used for the world premiere of Karlheinz Stockhausen's Helikopter-Streichquartett.

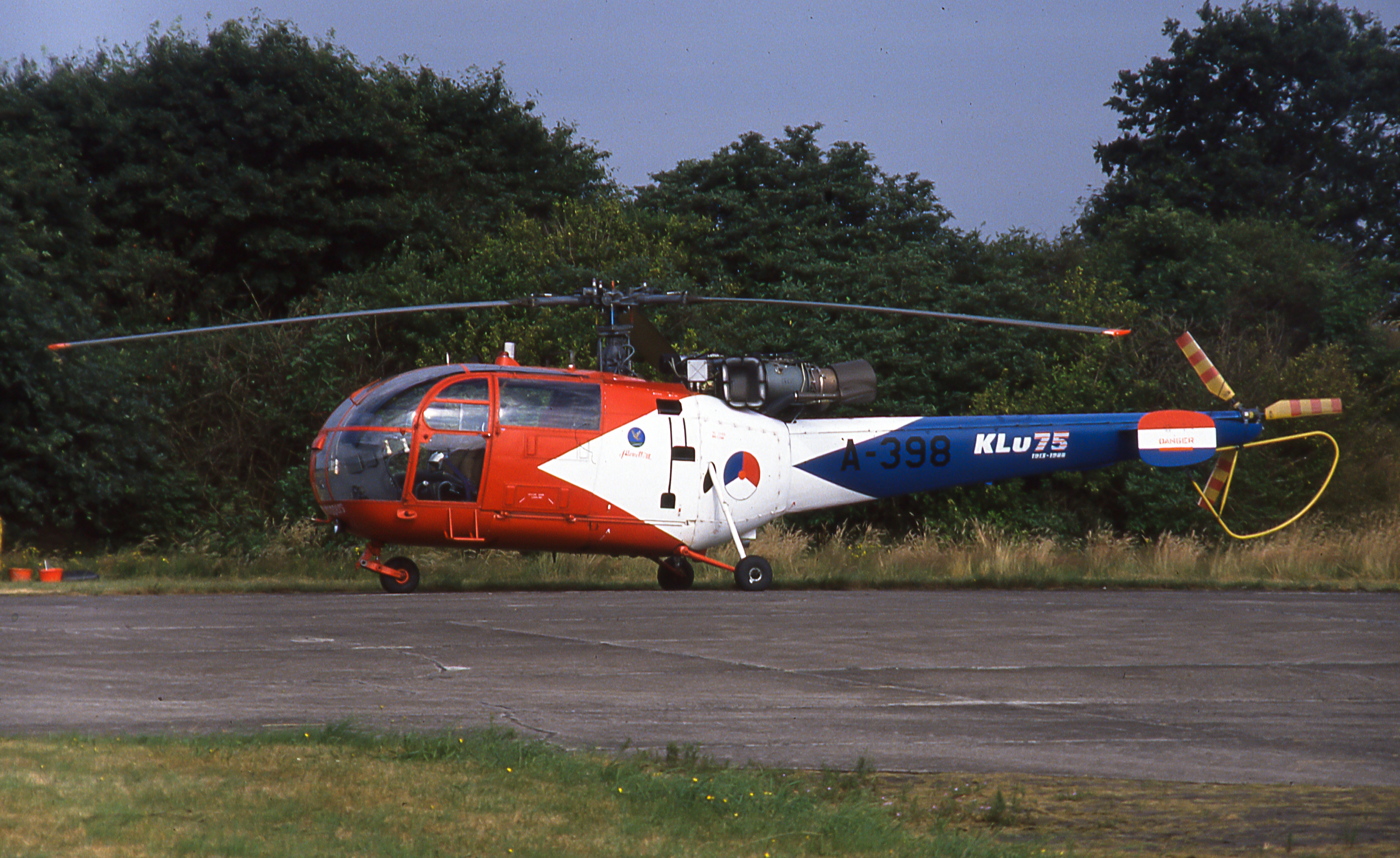
Aérospatiale Alouette III in special markings for the 75th Anniversary of the Royal Netherlands Air Force at Deelen in 1988

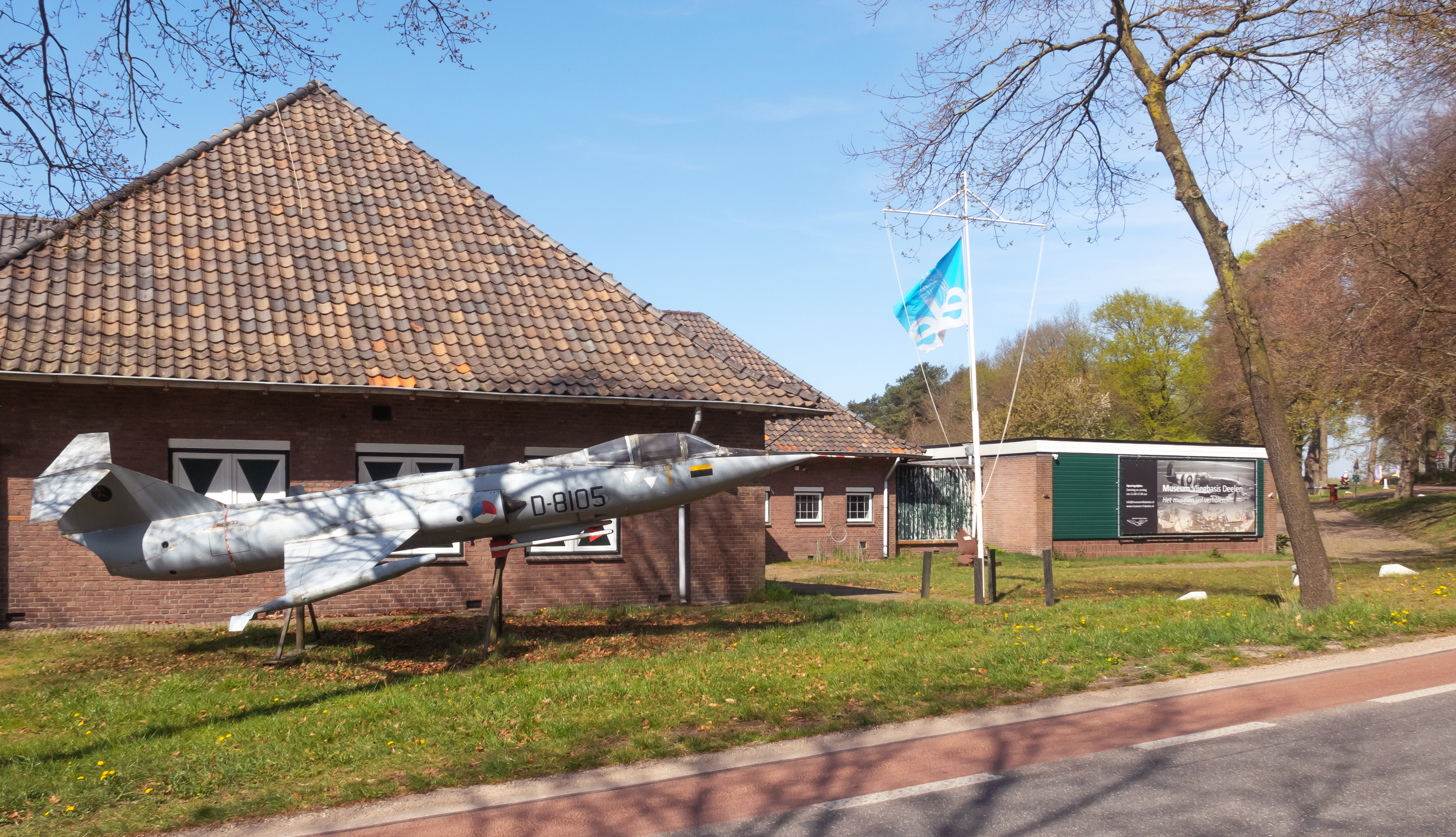
Museum Vliegbasis (air base) Deelen

There was less need for the air base after the end of the Cold War and in 1995 the base was closed. The top layer of the runway was removed making it no longer suitable for landings by heavy aircraft. Its designation was downgraded to Military Aviation Site Deelen (Dutch: Militair Luchtvaart Terrein Deelen). However, it has remained in use as a military site for helicopter training and for that reason is frequently visited by various military helicopters, such as the Boeing AH-64 Apache, Boeing CH-47 Chinook and Eurocopter AS532 Cougar. None of these helicopters are based at Deelen, the base is only fully operational when exercises take place. The closure of Soesterberg Air Base resulted in more helicopter movements at Gilze-Rijen Air Base, and in order to reduce traffic there it was decided to use Deelen more often as a training site. To facilitate this it was decided to resurface part of the runway and to create a slope for helicopters to practice sloped landings on. The increased importance of Deelen resulted in it once again receiving the designation of Air Base (Dutch: Vliegbasis).

In December 2025 the Dutch government chose Deelen Air Base as location were a dirt strip will be built. This expansion will allow the RNLASF to perform and train tactical airlift from an unpaved runway.

There is also glider activity on the field and very nearby there is a second aerodrome used almost exclusively by gliders, Terlet Airfield.
