= Walter Grabmann =

German general

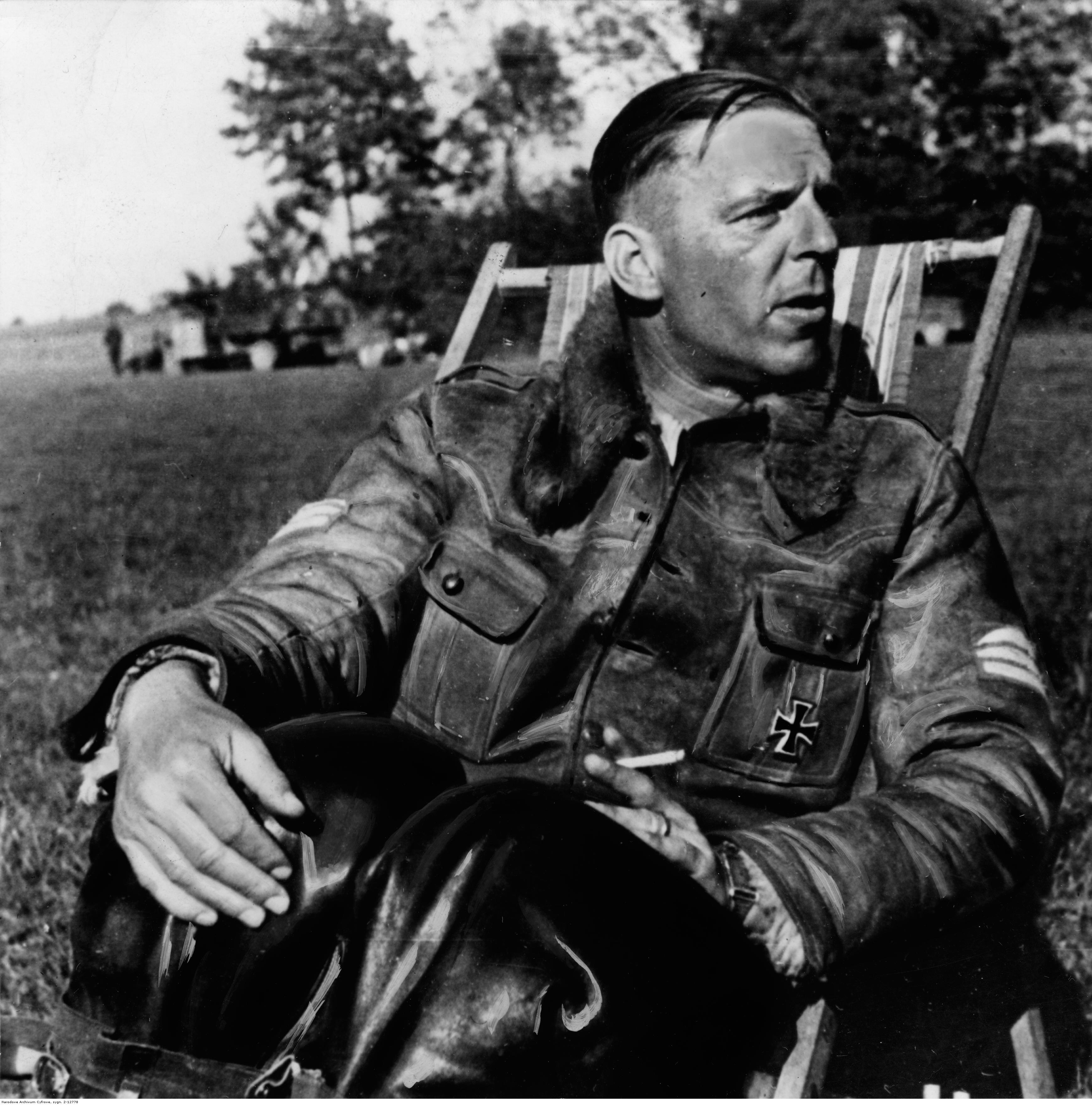
- Grabmann in 1940
- Born: 20 September 1905
- Died: 20 August 1992 (aged 86)
- Military career
- Allegiance: Weimar Republic; Nazi Germany
- Branch: Luftpolizei 1924–34; Luftwaffe 1934–45
- Rank: Generalmajor
- Commands: J/88 (Legion Condor); ZG 76; 3rd Fighter Division
- Conflicts: Spanish Civil War; World War II: Invasion of Poland; Battle of France; Battle of Britain
- Awards: Knight's Cross of the Iron Cross

Walter Grabmann (20 September 1905 – 20 August 1992) was a German general in the Luftwaffe during World War II. He was also a recipient of the Knight's Cross of the Iron Cross of Nazi Germany. Grabmann was credited with 7 aerial victories during the Spanish Civil War claimed in 137 combat missions.

== Career ==
Grabmann joined the Police force in 1924, learning to fly and serving with the Luftpolizei (Air Police), assigned to Flight Surveillance North Bavaria, Fürth. He then enlisted in the Luftwaffe in October 1934, and served as Adjutant, Jagdgeschwader 134 "Horst Wessel" from March 1936.

From September 1938 to March 1939 Major Grabmann was Commander of Jagdgruppe 88 with the German Condor Legion in Spain, equipped with Heinkel He 51 biplanes and early versions of the Messerschmitt Bf 109. He claimed a Polikarpov I-15, I-16 and an SB-2 bomber all shot down on 23 September 1938. Another SB-2 was downed on 10 October 1938, and a I-16 on 15 October. His last claim (an I-15) was on 4 January 1939.

Following his return to Germany, he was appointed Gruppenkommandeur (group commander) of I.(Zerstörer) Gruppe of Lehrgeschwader 1 (LG 1—1st Demonstration Wing) on 1 April 1939, succeeding Hauptmann Axel von Blomberg in this capacity. At the time, the unit was based at Barth and had just been equipped with the Messerschmitt Bf 110 heavy fighter, the first Luftwaffe unit to receive this aircraft.

In July 1939 he served with V.(Z)/LG 1. Whilst providing cover for the Heinkel H 111Ps of II./Kampfgeschwader 1, LG 1 encountered Polish PZL P.11s of the Brygada Pościgowa over Warsaw on the evening of 1 September 1939. Major Grabmann was wounded in this encounter when his Bf 110 was hit by fire from a Polish PZL P.11 fighter.

On 15 April 1940 Grabman became CO of Zerstörergeschwader 76. On 18 May 1940 Royal Air Force Hawker Hurricanes shot down 3 Bf 110Cs of ZG 76, including Grabmann, while flying a low-level attack on Douai airfield. He parachuted to safety (his gunner Fw. Krone was killed) and was captured by French troops. Grabmann was rescued six days later by an advancing German panzer column.

He was awarded the Knight's Cross of the Iron Cross on 14 September 1940. Oberstlt. Grabmann was credited with a further 6 victories during World War II — 1 during the Battle of France and 5 in the Battle of Britain — claimed in about 110 combat missions.

In August 1941 Grabmann commanded Zerstörerschule 2 in Memmingen, and in August 1942 was appointed Fighter Leader for the Holland area (Jafü Holland). During this time Grabmann flew a Focke-Wulf Fw 190A-5, (Werknummer 410054—factory number) "X" as his personal mount. In November 1943 Grabmann became Commander, 3. Jagddivision and then 1. Jagddivision in April 1945.

General Major Grabmann was taken prisoner at the end of the war, and repatriated to Germany in May 1948. He died in Munich on 20 August 1992.

== Summary of career ==
=== Aerial victory claims ===
According to Obermaier, Grabmann was credited with 13 aerial victories, seven in the Spanish Civil War and six on the Western Front of World War II, claimed in approximately 250 combat missions, 137 of which in Spain. Mathews and Foreman, authors of Luftwaffe Aces — Biographies and Victory Claims, researched the German Federal Archives and found documentation for 13 aerial victory claims. This number of confirmed claims includes seven claims during the Spanish Civil War and six over the Western Allies.

Chronicle of aerial victories
This and the – (dash) indicates unconfirmed aerial victory claims for which Grabmann did not receive credit. This and the ? (question mark) indicates information discrepancies listed by Forsyth, Mathews and Foreman.
Claim	Date	Time	Type	Location	Claim	Date	Time	Type	Location
– Stab of Jagdgruppe 88 – Spanish Civil War
1	23 September 1938	—	SB-2		5	15 October 1938	—	I-16	
2	23 September 1938	—	I-15		— ? (Note: According to Mathews and Foreman this claim was confirmed.)	3 November 1938	—	I-16	
3	23 September 1938	—	I-16		6	4 January 1939	—	I-15? (Note: According to Mathews and Foreman claimed as a Curtiss P-40 Warhawk.)	
4	10 October 1938	—	SB-2						

=== Awards ===
- Spanish Cross in Gold with Swords (14 April 1939)
- Spanish Medalla de la Campaña
- Spanish Medalla Militar
- Ehrenpokal der Luftwaffe (8 July 1940)
- Iron Cross 2nd and 1st Class
- Knight's Cross of the Iron Cross (14 September 1940) as Oberstleutnant and Geschwaderkommodore of Zerstörergeschwader 76

== Notes ==
Military offices
Preceded by none	Commander of Zerstörergeschwader 76; 15 April 1940 – 31 July 1941	Succeeded by Oberstleutnant Theodor Rossiwall
Preceded by none	Commander of Jagdfliegerführer Norwegen; June 1941 – 31 July 1941	Succeeded by unknown
Preceded by Generalleutnant Kurt-Bertram von Döring	Commander of 3. Jagd-Division; 11 November 1943 – 4 April 1945	Succeeded by none
Preceded by Oberst Heinrich Wittmer	Commander of 1. Jagd-Division; 5 April 1945 – 29 April 1945	Succeeded by Oberst Karl-Gottfried Nordmann
