= Orlík =

Orlík may refer to:

- Orlican VT-16 Orlík, a Czechoslovak glider
- Orlík nad Vltavou, a municipality and village in the Czech Republic
  - Orlík Reservoir
  - Orlík Castle
- 11339 Orlík, an asteroid
- Orlík (band), a Czech band
- Orlík, a mountain in the Czech Republic

== People ==
- Emil Orlík (1870–1932), Czech painter, etcher and lithographer

== See also ==
- Orlik (disambiguation) (equivalent word in Polish and other Slavic languages)
