= 4th Fighter Division =

Division of the German Luftwaffe

4th Fighter Division (4. Jagd-Division) was one of the primary divisions of the German Luftwaffe in World War II. It was formed in August 1942 in Döberitz from the sub units of the 2nd Air Corps. The Division was redesignated 1st Fighter Division on 15 September 1943 and reformed 15 September 1943 in Metz from 3rd Fighter Division of the 2nd Fighter Corps. The unit was disbanded on 8 September 1944.

== Commanding officers ==
- Generalleutnant Joachim-Friedrich Huth, 17 August 1942 – 15 September 1943
- Generalmajor Werner Junck, 15 September 1943 – 30 September 1943
- Oberst Carl Vieck, October 1943 – September 1944

== See also ==
- Luftwaffe Organisation
