= Peter Kalden =

German fighter ace and Knight's Cross recipient

- Born: 17 August 1923; Wittenberge, Germany
- Died: 11 June 1996 (aged 72); Friedrichsdorf, Germany
- Military career
- Allegiance: Nazi Germany
- Branch: Luftwaffe
- Unit: JG 51
- Conflicts: World War II
- Awards: Knight's Cross of the Iron Cross

Peter Kalden (17 August 1923 – 11 June 1996) was a German World War II fighter ace, attached to Jagdgeschwader 51. Depending on source, he was credited with 69 or 84 aerial victories.

== Career ==
Kalden was born on 17 August 1923 in Wittenberge in the Province of Brandenburg of the Weimar Republic.

On 2 May 1944, Kalden was wounded in combat when he was shot down in his Messerschmitt Bf 109 G-6 (Werknummer 140356—factory number) near Kurovichi.

On 1 August, Kalden was appointed Staffelkapitän (squadron leader) of 10. Staffel of Jagdgeschwader 51 (JG 51—51st Fighter Wing). He replaced Oberleutnant Heinz Venth who had been reported as missing in action on 16 July. On 15 August, as part of the group expansion from three Staffeln per Gruppe to four Staffeln per Gruppe, 10. Staffel was re-designated and became the 13. Staffel while 11. Staffel became the 14. Staffel of JG 51. Consequently, Kalden then commanded 13. Staffel.

Kalden was awarded the Knight's Cross of the Iron Cross (Ritterkreuz des Eisernen Kreuzes) on 6 December 1944. The presentation was 11 days later by Generalmajor Robert Fuchs. On 11 March 1945, Kalden attacked Soviet armor near Neustadt in Westpreußen, present-day Wejherowo. On this mission, he was shot down in his Bf 109 G-14 (Werknummer 511439) by Soviet anti-aircraft artillery resulting in a crash landing near Danzig, present-day Gdańsk, and was taken prisoner of war. Command of 13. Staffel then briefly went to Leutnant Engel before Leutnant Kurt Tanzer was given command on 12 April.

== Later life ==
Kalden died on 11 June 1996 at the age of 72 in Friedrichsdorf, Germany.

== Summary of career ==
=== Aerial victory claims ===
According to US historian David T. Zabecki, Kalden was credited with 69 aerial victories. Spick lists him with 84 aerial victories claimed in 538 combat missions. Mathews and Foreman, authors of Luftwaffe Aces — Biographies and Victory Claims, researched the German Federal Archives and found records for 69 aerial victory claims, plus further fifteen unconfirmed and undated claims, all of which claimed on the Eastern Front.

Victory claims were logged to a map-reference (PQ = Planquadrat), for example "PQ 35 Ost 63251". The Luftwaffe grid map (Jägermeldenetz) covered all of Europe, western Russia and North Africa and was composed of rectangles measuring 15 minutes of latitude by 30 minutes of longitude, an area of about 360 square miles (930 km^{2}). These sectors were then subdivided into 36 smaller units to give a location area 3 km × 4 km (1.9 mi × 2.5 mi) in size.

Chronicle of aerial victories
This and the ? (question mark) indicates information discrepancies listed by Prien, Stemmer, Rodeike, Balke, Bock, Mathews and Foreman.
Claim	Date	Time	Type	Location	Claim	Date	Time	Type	Location
– 11. Staffel of Jagdgeschwader 51 – Eastern Front — 4 February – 31 December 1943
1	13 July 1943	13:38	Yak-1	PQ 35 Ost 63251; 15 km (9.3 mi) southeast of Zalegoshch	7	3 October 1943	08:48	La-5	northeast of Orlik
2	14 July 1943	15:52	Il-2 m.H. (Note: The "m.H." refers to an Ilyushin Il-2 with rear gunner (mit Heckschütze).)	PQ 35 Ost 54412; 30 km (19 mi) northeast of Dudorovskiy	8	3 October 1943	08:50	La-5	north of Orlik
3	17 July 1943	04:14	LaGG-3	PQ 35 Ost 63214 vicinity of Zalegoshch	9	24 October 1943	11:28	Yak-9	southeast of Petrovo
4	31 July 1943	09:31? (Note: According to Mathews and Foreman claimed at 09:21.)	LaGG-3	PQ 35 Ost 54488; 20 km (12 mi) west-northwest of Bolkhov	10	30 November 1943	12:04	P-39	6 km (3.7 mi) north of Malaya-Wolaska
5	14 September 1943	14:32	Yak-1	north of Pologi	11	11 December 1943	11:06	Il-2 m.H.	PQ 34 Ost 39511; 35 km (22 mi) west of Borovichi
6	20 September 1943	13:30	La-5	northeast of Dnipropetrovsk	12	17 December 1943	11:22	P-39	PQ 34 Ost 29825
– 11. Staffel of Jagdgeschwader 51 – Eastern Front — 1 January – 31 July 1944
13	5 January 1944	12:09	La-5	PQ 25 Ost 90732; 65 km (40 mi) east of Vinnytsia	24	2 May 1944	05:49	Il-2 m.H.	PQ 25 Ost 50126; 25 km (16 mi) southeast of Brody
14	10 January 1944	11:18	Il-2 m.H.	PQ 25 Ost 80682; 25 km (16 mi) southeast of Vinnytsia	25	2 May 1944	05:50? (Note: According to Mathews and Foreman claimed at 05:46.)	Il-2 m.H.	PQ 25 Ost 50131; 15 km (9.3 mi) southeast of Brody
15	10 January 1944	11:22	Yak-1	PQ 25 Ost 80681; 25 km (16 mi) southeast of Vinnytsia	26	7 July 1944	10:07	Yak-9	PQ 25 Ost 55449; 25 km (16 mi) southeast of Yukhnov
16	10 January 1944	11:24	Yak-1	PQ 25 Ost 80683; 25 km (16 mi) southeast of Vinnytsia	27	7 July 1944	14:53	Yak-9	PQ 25 Ost 55476; 30 km (19 mi) south-southeast of Yukhnov
17	11 January 1944	15:03	Il-2 m.H.	PQ 25 Ost 80662; 30 km (19 mi) east-northeast of Vinnytsia	28	16 July 1944	07:53	Yak-9	PQ 25 Ost 50318; 15 km (9.3 mi) southeast of Zolochiv
18	12 January 1944	09:38	Il-2 m.H.	PQ 25 Ost 90549; 40 km (25 mi) south-southeast of Koziatyn	29	18 July 1944	19:28	Yak-9	PQ 25 Ost 50383; 25 km (16 mi) west of Tarnopol
19	24 January 1944	11:13	La-5	PQ 25 Ost 80431 vicinity of Koziatyn	30	19 July 1944	13:43	R-5	PQ 25 Ost 40135; 25 km (16 mi) northwest of Zolochiv
20	1 February 1944	09:29	Pe-2	PQ 34 Ost 09134	31	20 July 1944	13:03	Pe-2	PQ 25 Ost 40123; 20 km (12 mi) northeast of Lviv
21	7 April 1944	17:55	Il-2	PQ 25 Ost 50712; 25 km (16 mi) south-southeast of Berezhany	32	21 July 1944	16:31	Boston	PQ 25 Ost 30233; 20 km (12 mi) southwest of Zolochiv
22	16 April 1944	13:43	Yak-9	PQ 25 Ost 50389; 25 km (16 mi) west of Tarnopol	33	21 July 1944	16:38	P-39	PQ 25 Ost 40113; 15 km (9.3 mi) north of Lviv
23	2 May 1944	05:48	Yak-9	PQ 25 Ost 50122; 15 km (9.3 mi) southeast of Brody	34	23 July 1944	10:08	Pe-2	PQ 25 Ost 30225; 20 km (12 mi) southwest of Żółkiew
– 10. Staffel of Jagdgeschwader 51 – Eastern Front — 1–34 August 1944
35	2 August 1944	08:17	Yak-9	PQ 25 Ost 25433; 25 km (16 mi) east-southeast of Blumenfeld	37	8 August 1944	12:31	Yak-9	PQ 25 Ost 36548; 20 km (12 mi) east-southeast of Nemakščiai
36	4 August 1944	07:54	Yak-9	PQ 25 Ost 36599; 30 km (19 mi) west of Kėdainiai	38	13 August 1944	19:36	Yak-9	PQ 25 Ost 24613; 45 km (28 mi) northeast of Łomża
– 13. Staffel of Jagdgeschwader 51 – Eastern Front — 15 August – 31 December 1944
39	16 August 1944	17:23	Yak-9	PQ 25 Ost 26628 vicinity of Nemakščiai	53	13 October 1944	13:14	Il-2 m.H.	PQ 25 Ost 13545, Jabłonna; 15 km (9.3 mi) north of Warsaw
40	17 August 1944	15:06	Yak-1	PQ 25 Ost 25283; 15 km (9.3 mi) east of Blumenfeld	54	13 October 1944	15:57	Il-2 m.H.	PQ 25 Ost 13518, Radzymin; 20 km (12 mi) north of Warsaw
41	17 August 1944	17:23	Yak-9	PQ 25 Ost 26628 vicinity of Nemakščiai	55	14 October 1944	11:14	Boston	PQ 25 Ost 13722; 15 km (9.3 mi) east of Warsaw
42	1 September 1944	10:54? (Note: According to Mathews and Foreman claimed at 10:53.)	Il-2	PQ 25 Ost 13559; 15 km (9.3 mi) northeast of Warsaw	56	14 October 1944	16:07	Il-2 m.H.	PQ 25 Ost 13517; 20 km (12 mi) north of Warsaw
43	1 September 1944	10:58	Yak-9	PQ 25 Ost 13583; 15 km (9.3 mi) east-northeast of Warsaw	57	14 October 1944	16:08	Il-2 m.H.	PQ 25 Ost 03663; 15 km (9.3 mi) northwest of Warsaw
44	1 September 1944	13:40	Yak-9	PQ 25 Ost 13528; 25 km (16 mi) north-northeast of Warsaw	58	14 October 1944	16:09	Il-2 m.H.	PQ 25 Ost 03666; 15 km (9.3 mi) northwest of Warsaw
45	4 September 1944	17:16	Yak-9	PQ 25 Ost 13221; 20 km (12 mi) southeast of Ostrołęka	59	15 October 1944	09:29	Boston	PQ 25 Ost 13517; 20 km (12 mi) north of Warsaw
46	1 October 1944	16:11	Pe-2	PQ 25 Ost 13595; 25 km (16 mi) north-northeast of Warsaw	60	15 October 1944	13:52	Yak-9	PQ 25 Ost 03499; 10 km (6.2 mi) northwest of Warsaw
47	7 October 1944	12:57	Il-2 m.H.	PQ 25 Ost 13357; 25 km (16 mi) east of Nasielsk	61	19 October 1944	08:42	Il-2 m.H.	PQ 25 Ost 13348; 20 km (12 mi) east of Nasielsk
48	7 October 1944	13:02	Boston	PQ 25 Ost 13651; 25 km (16 mi) east of Nasielsk	62	19 October 1944	08:44	Il-2 m.H.	PQ 25 Ost 13379; 20 km (12 mi) east of Nasielsk
49	7 October 1944	13:12	Boston	PQ 25 Ost 13343; 20 km (12 mi) east of Nasielsk	63	19 October 1944	08:45	Il-2 m.H.	PQ 25 Ost 13349; 20 km (12 mi) east-southeast of Nasielsk
50	10 October 1944	13:13	Il-2 m.H.	PQ 25 Ost 13517; 20 km (12 mi) north of Warsaw	64	21 October 1944	16:11	Yak-9	PQ 25 Ost 13372; 20 km (12 mi) east-southeast of Nasielsk
51? (Note: This claim is not listed by Prien, Stemmer, Balke and Bock.)	13 October 1944	09:26	P-39	15 km (9.3 mi) east of Modlin	65	24 October 1944	08:54	Boston	PQ 25 Ost 03457; 30 km (19 mi) east-northeast of Modlin
52	13 October 1944	09:29	Boston	PQ 25 Ost 13512; 20 km (12 mi) north of Warsaw					
– 13. Staffel of Jagdgeschwader 51 – Eastern Front — 1 January – 11 March 1945
66	19 January 1945	—	unknown		68	24 January 1945	—	unknown	
67	24 January 1945	—	unknown		69	24 January 1945	—	unknown	

=== Awards ===
- Iron Cross (1939) 2nd and 1st Class
- Honor Goblet of the Luftwaffe on 8 May 1944 as Leutnant and pilot
- Knight's Cross of the Iron Cross on 6 December 1944 as Leutnant and Staffelführer of the 13./Jagdgeschwader 51 "Mölders" (Note: According to Scherzer as pilot in the 13./Jagdgeschwader 51 "Mölders".)
- German Cross in Gold on 1 January 1945 as Leutnant in the 10./Jagdgeschwader 51
