= Tupolev ANT-10 =

ANT-10 / R-7

General information
- Type: Reconnaissance/Light bomber
- National origin: Soviet Union
- Manufacturer: Tupolev
- Number built: 1

History
- First flight: 30 January 1930
- Developed from: Tupolev R-3

The Tupolev ANT-10 (also known as the R-7) was a prototype single-engined light bomber/reconnaissance aircraft of the 1930s. Only a single example was built, the Polikarpov R-5 being preferred.

== Development and design ==
In 1928, the design bureau led by Nikolai Nikolaevich Polikarpov produced the R-5 to replace the R-1, an unlicensed copy of the Airco DH.9A, which was the Soviet Union's standard light reconnaissance aircraft/bomber. As a response, the design bureau led by Andrei Tupolev produced a rival replacement for the R-1, based on Tupolev's earlier Tupolev R-3. Like the R-3, the new design, the ANT-10 was a single-engined sesquiplane with a duralumin structure, but with a much larger upper wing (based on that of the I-4 fighter). Like the R-5, it was powered by an imported BMW VI engine. It could carry 500 kg (1,100 lb) of bombs in an internal bomb-bay.

The ANT-10 (which received the Soviet Air Force designation R-7) made its first flight on 30 January 1930, but its performance was little better than the R-5, while the R-5's wooden structure was advantageous at a time of metal shortages. The type was therefore abandoned later in the year in favour of the R-5.

== Specifications ==
Data from Tupolev: The Man and His Aircraft

General characteristics

- Crew: two
- Length: 10.9 m (35 ft 9 in)
- Wingspan: 15.2 m (49 ft 10 in)
- Height: 3.6 m (11 ft 10 in)
- Wing area: 49 m^{2} (530 sq ft)
- Empty weight: 1,720 kg (3,792 lb)
- Gross weight: 2,920 kg (6,437 lb)
- Powerplant: 1 × BMW VI water-cooled V12 engine, 370 kW (500 hp)

Performance

- Maximum speed: 235 km/h (146 mph, 127 kn)
- Range: 1,100 km (680 mi, 590 nmi)
- Endurance: 5 hours
- Service ceiling: 5,500 m (18,000 ft)
- Time to altitude: 3.1 minutes to 1,000 m (3,280 ft)

Armament

- Guns: 2× PV-1 machine guns
- Bombs: 500 kg (1,100 lb)

== See also ==
Related development

- Tupolev R-3

Aircraft of comparable role, configuration, and era

- Polikarpov R-5
