= Friedrich Beckh =

German World War II military aviator (1908–1942)

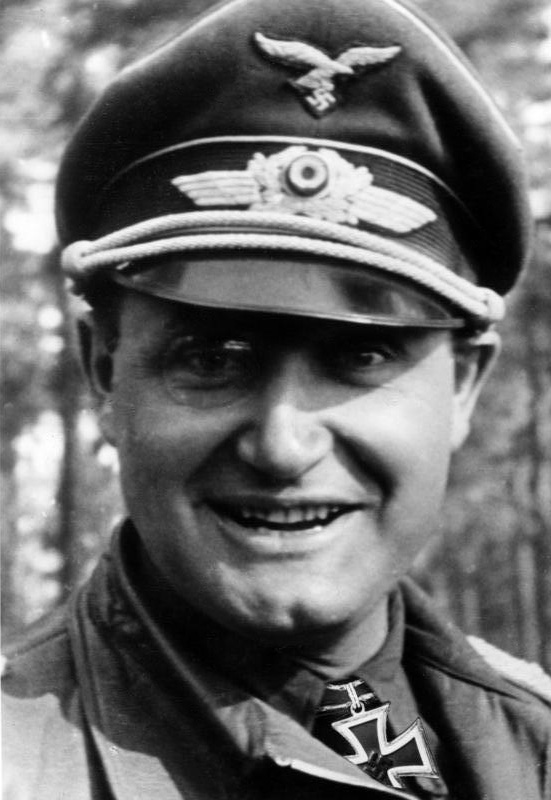
- Beckh as a Major
- Born: 17 January 1908; Nuremberg
- Died: 21 June 1942 (aged 34) near Kharkov, Soviet Union
- Military career
- Allegiance: Weimar Republic (to 1933); Nazi Germany
- Branch: Luftwaffe
- Service years: 1926–1942
- Rank: Oberstleutnant (lieutenant colonel)
- Commands: JG 51, JG 52
- Conflicts: World War II: Battle of Britain; Operation Barbarossa
- Awards: Knight's Cross of the Iron Cross

Friedrich Beckh (17 January 1908 – 21 June 1942) was a Luftwaffe wing commander and fighter ace of Nazi Germany during World War II. As a fighter ace, he claimed 48 aerial victories in an unknown number of combat missions. This figure includes 44 claims on the Eastern Front and four over the Western Allies, for which he was awarded the Knight's Cross of the Iron Cross. He held the position of Geschwaderkommodore of fighter wing Jagdgeschwader 51 and Jagdgeschwader 52.

== Early life and career ==
Beckh was born on 17 January 1908 in Nuremberg in the Kingdom of Bavaria within the German Empire. On 1 April 1926, he joined the military service of the Reichswehr, the 100,000 men strong army of the Weimar Republic, as a Funker (lit. radio operator) and officer candidate. Initially, Beckh served in the cavalry and was promoted to Leutnant (second lieutenant) on 1 April 1933. In 1935, he transferred to the newly emerging Luftwaffe. Following flight training, (Note: Flight training in the Luftwaffe progressed through the levels A1, A2 and B1, B2, referred to as A/B flight training. A training included theoretical and practical training in aerobatics, navigation, long-distance flights and dead-stick landings. The B courses included high-altitude flights, instrument flights, night landings and training to handle the aircraft in difficult situations.) Beckh was transferred to Jagdgeschwader 134 "Horst Wessel" (JG 134—134th Fighter Wing). From 1 November 1937 to 8 February 1938, Beckh attended the Luftkriegsschule 2 (2nd Air War Academy) in Berlin–Gatow.

== World War II ==
World War II in Europe began on Friday 1 September 1939 when German forces invaded Poland. By the time, he had already occupied several positions on the General Staff and because of his age did not fly any combat sorties. Instead, he was lecturing at the Air War Academy. It was during 1940 as Jägerverbindungsoffizier (fighter communications or liaison officer) in the Luftgaukommando Wiesbaden (air district commands) that he became close friends with Werner Mölders, the two men served in JG 134. When Mölders became Geschwaderkommodore (wing commander) of Jagdgeschwader 51 (JG 51—51st Fighter Wing) on 27 July 1940 he arranged for Beckh to transfer to the Geschwaderstab (headquarters unit) of JG 51.

=== Group commander ===
On 1 March 1941, Beckh was appointed Gruppenkommandeur (group commander) of IV. Gruppe of JG 51, succeeding Oberleutnant Hans-Karl Keitel who was posted as missing in action. That month, he was also promoted to Major (major). Following the appointment, Mölders had assigned Leutnant Bernd Gallowitsch as Beckh's regular wingman. Gallowitsch had good eyesight and compensated for Beckh's inabilities. The assignment was based on a recommendation made by Prof. Dr. Paul Robert Skawran, a psychologist who had studied fighter pilot aptitudes and combat readiness with JG 51 at the time. On 5 March, Beckh claimed his first aerial victory. His opponent was a Royal Air Force (RAF) Supermarine Spitfire fighter from No. 610 Squadron which was shot down near Boulogne-sur-Mer.

Beckh claimed three further aerial victories over the RAF on the English Channel. On 10 March, he claimed a Spitfire fighter 20 kilometers (12 miles) west of Le Tréport, followed by another Spitfire fighter on 6 May in an area 20 kilometers (12 miles) north of Cap Blanc-Nez, and lastly a Hawker Hurricane fighter on 21 May in vicinity of 20 kilometers (12 miles) north of Calais. The Gruppe was withdrawn from the English Channel and relocated to Mönchengladbach on 7 June for a brief period of replenishment.

=== Operation Barbarossa ===
On 15 June, IV. Gruppe of JG 51 began transferring east and was located at an airfield named Krzewicze, located approximately 70 kilometers (43 miles) west of Brest-Litovsk. On 22 June, German forces launched Operation Barbarossa, the German invasion of the Soviet Union. JG 51 was subordinated to II. Fliegerkorps (2nd Air Corps), which as part of Luftflotte 2 (Air Fleet 2). JG 51 area of operation during Operation Barbarossa was over the right flank of Army Group Center in the combat area of the 2nd Panzer Group as well as the 4th Army. On the first day of the invasion, Beckh led IV. Gruppe on an early morning fighter escort mission for Junkers Ju 87 dive bombers attacking Brest-Litovsk, and further combat air patrols east of the Bug. On one of these missions, Beckh claimed a two-seat fighter biplane Kochyerigin DI-6 shot down.

On 24 June, IV. Gruppe followed the German advance and relocated to an airfield at Pruzhany, located approximately 60 kilometers (37 miles) northeast of Brest-Litovsk. That day, Beckh claimed an Ilyushin DB-3 bomber destroyed east of Pruzhany. Three days later, he claimed a Tupolev SB shot down. On 28 June, the Gruppe moved to Slonim, to Baranavichy on 1 July, to Minsk the next day and to Barysaw on 7 July. Operating from Barysaw that day, Beckh claimed his eighth aerial victory when he shot down an I-18, an early war Luftwaffe designation for the Mikoyan-Gurevich MiG-1 fighter near Orsha.

=== Wing commander ===
On 19 July 1941, Beckh was appointed Geschwaderkommodore of JG 51. He succeeded Mölders in this capacity who transferred and appointed Inspekteur der Jagdflieger (Inspector of Fighters). Command of IV. Gruppe then passed on to Haupmann Karl-Gottfried Nordmann. At the time, the Geschwaderstab of JG 51 was based at Orsha.

JG 51 emblem

On 8 September, JG 51 supported Heinz Guderian's 2nd Panzer Army in the battles around Kiev. That day, Beckh claimed the Geschwader's 2000th aerial victory. However, on 16 September, during a fighter sweep, his Messerschmitt Bf 109 F-2 (Werknummer 8988—factory number) was hit by anti-aircraft artillery, resulting in a forced landing 30 kilometers (19 miles) east of Konotop. During his convalescence, he was temporarily replaced by Major Günther Lützow as commander of JG 51. Two days after being wounded in action, he was awarded the Knight's Cross of the Iron Cross (Ritterkreuz des Eisernen Kreuzes) for 27 aerial victories, 23 of them on the Eastern Front. Initially, he had insisted on leading the Geschwader from the ground. However, the injury caused by the incendiary round which had punctured his left foot had turned into gangrene. When Mölders visited him on 4 October, he immediately had him transferred to a Luftwaffe hospital in Munich-Oberföhring.

Beckh returned to the Geschwader on 21 December 1941. Since he had not yet fully recovered from his injuries, Beckh was unable to fly operationally. In January 1942, Beckh was tasked with the formation of Gefechtsverband Beckh (detachment Beck), a temporary unit consisting of the Geschwaderstab and IV. Gruppe of JG 51, and II. Gruppe of Sturzkampfgeschwader 1 (StG 1—1st Dive Bomber Wing). Gefechtsverband Beckh supported German ground forces fighting in the area of Yukhnov and Medyn. By March 1942, Beckh had fully recovered from his injuries and again flew operationally. He then became an "ace-in-a-day" on two separate occasions, claiming five aerial victories on 31 March and six aerial victories on 5 April, increasing his total to 41 claims. On 11 April, Beckh was transferred to the Reichsluftfahrtministerium (RLM—Ministry of Aviation). Oberst Adolf Galland, Mölders' successor as Inspekteur der Jagdflieger, was responsible for Beckh's transfer to the RLM. Galland was mindful of Beckh's organizational and managerial talents. Galland quickly realized that the changing air-war necessitated changes in his staff and thus replaced Johannes Janke with Beckh. Command of JG 51 was then passed to then Major Nordmann who had previously led IV. Gruppe of JG 51. On 11 May, Beckh was awarded the Honor Goblet of the Luftwaffe (Ehrenpokal der Luftwaffe).

=== With Jagdgeschwader 52 and death ===
Beckh was then appointed Geschwaderkommodore of Jagdgeschwader 52 (JG 52—52nd Fighter Wing) on 3 June 1942 barely two months later following the death of Major Wilhelm Lessmann. At the time, the Geschwaderstab of JG 52 was based at Barvinkove.

On 21 June 1942, Beckh was airborne in his Bf 109 F-4 "weiße 4" (Werknummer 13362) with his wingman for a low-level sortie in the area of Izium-Kupiansk-Valuyki, east of Kharkov. East of Valuyki, the duo observed a Soviet air base with fighters on the ground. Beckh dived, claiming two fighters, but his wingman observed Beckh's F-4 taking a number of flak hits before it too nosed down and appeared to plunge to the ground. The Bf 109 came down in a marsh near Valuyki. His body was found inside his fighter when the site was excavated in 2004. At the time of his death he claimed over 40 aircraft in aerial combat and a dozen on the ground. Beckh was succeeded by Major Herbert Ihlefeld as commander of JG 52. Posthumously, Beckh was promoted to Oberstleutnant (lieutenant colonel).

== Summary of career ==
=== Aerial victory claims ===
According to Obermaier, Beckh was credited with 48 aerial victories claimed in an unknown number of combat missions. This figure includes 44 claims on the Eastern Front and four over the Western Allies. Mathews and Foreman, authors of Luftwaffe Aces — Biographies and Victory Claims, researched the German Federal Archives and found records for 40 aerial victory claims, plus two further unconfirmed claims. This figure of confirmed claims includes four aerial victories on the Western Front and 36 on the Eastern Front.

Chronicle of aerial victories
This and the ♠ (Ace of spades) indicates those aerial victories which made Beckh an "ace-in-a-day", a term which designates a fighter pilot who has shot down five or more airplanes in a single day. This and the ? (question mark) indicates information discrepancies listed by Prien, Stemmer, Rodeike, Bock, Mathews and Foreman.
Claim	Date	Time	Type	Location	Claim	Date	Time	Type	Location
– Stab VI. Gruppe of Jagdgeschwader 51 – Over England and on the English Channel — 1 March – 9 June 1941
1	5 March 1941	14:50	Spitfire	west of Boulogne	3	6 May 1941	13:55	Spitfire	20 km (12 mi) north of Cap Blanc-Nez
2	10 March 1941	17:25	Spitfire	20 km (12 mi) west of Le Tréport	4	21 May 1941	18:00	Hurricane	20 km (12 mi) north of Calais
– Stab VI. Gruppe of Jagdgeschwader 51 – Operation Barbarossa — 22 June – 19 July 1941
5	22 June 1941	06:25	DI-6		7	27 June 1941	10:03	SB-2	
6	24 June 1941	09:25	DB-3	10 km (6.2 mi) east of Pruzhany	8	7 July 1941	16:30	I-18 (MiG-1)	Orsha
– Stab of Jagdgeschwader 51 – Operation Barbarossa — 19 July – 5 December 1941
9	23 July 1941	08:16	unknown		18	27 August 1941	15:00	Pe-2	
10	2 August 1941	17:12	R-5	5 km (3.1 mi) south of Kondratowa	19	27 August 1941	15:00	Pe-2	
11	2 August 1941	17:15	I-15	5 km (3.1 mi) east of Aleksino	20	27 August 1941	15:05	Pe-2	15 km (9.3 mi) east of Novgorod
12	10 August 1941	10:43	I-61 (MiG-3)	10 km (6.2 mi) east of Vyshny Volochyok	21	6 September 1941	09:30	I-153	15 km (9.3 mi) south-southeast of Yelnya
13	10 August 1941	11:00	I-15	12 km (7.5 mi) northeast of Yelnya	22	6 September 1941	12:25	ground-attack aircraft	
14? (Note: According to Mathews and Foreman this claim is unconfirmed.)	12 August 1941	10:43	I-61 (MiG-3)		23	8 September 1941	09:35	I-61 (MiG-3)	
15	15 August 1941	16:45	I-61		24?	8 September 1941	—	I-61 (MiG-3)	
16	16 August 1941	08:45	R-5		25	10 September 1941	08:06	DB-3	
17	25 August 1941	15:10	R-3	25 km (16 mi) north of Novgorod	26	16 September 1941	15:05	SB-2	
– Stab of Jagdgeschwader 51 – Winter War — 6 December 1941 – 30 April 1942
27	11 March 1942	17:23	unknown		35♠	31 March 1942	15:25	unknown	
28	29 March 1942	10:25	unknown		36♠	5 April 1942	09:01	unknown	
29	30 March 1942	10:45	unknown		37♠	5 April 1942	09:03	unknown	
30	30 March 1942	17:25	unknown		38♠	5 April 1942	09:05	unknown	
31♠	31 March 1942	08:42	unknown		39♠	5 April 1942	10:01	unknown	
32♠	31 March 1942	08:43	unknown		40♠	5 April 1942	10:35	unknown	
33♠	31 March 1942	12:08	unknown		41♠	5 April 1942	17:15	unknown	
34♠	31 March 1942	12:12	unknown						

=== Awards ===
- Iron Cross (1939) 2nd and 1st Class
- Knight's Cross of the Iron Cross on 18 September 1941 as Major and Geschwaderkommodore of Jagdgeschwader 51
- Honor Goblet of the Luftwaffe on 11 May 1942 as Major and Geschwaderkommodore

== Notes ==
Military offices
Preceded by Oberstleutnant Werner Mölders	Commander of Jagdgeschwader 51 "Mölders"; 19 July 1941 – 11 April 1942	Succeeded by Major Karl-Gottfried Nordmann
Preceded by Major Wilhelm Lessmann	Commander of Jagdgeschwader 52; 3 June 1942 – 21 June 1942	Succeeded by Major Herbert Ihlefeld
