= Jagdfliegerführer Ostpreussen =

Jagdfliegerführer Ostpreußen was initially part of 1st Fighter Division of the German Luftwaffe in World War II. It was formed 15 September 1943 in Neuhausen. On 8 September 1944 the Stab relocated to Königsberg-Seewiesen and subordinated to the Luftflotte 6 (Air Fleet 6) in January 1945. The Stab relocated again on 27 February 1945, this time to Treuenbrietzen. The unit was disbanded on 27 February 1945.

== Commanding officers ==
=== Fliegerführer ===
- Oberstleutnant Karl-Gottfried Nordmann, 1 April 1944
- Hauptmann Egbert Belau, 1 October 1944
