= Orlik, Pomeranian Voivodeship =

Village in Poland

Orlik Òrlik
- Village
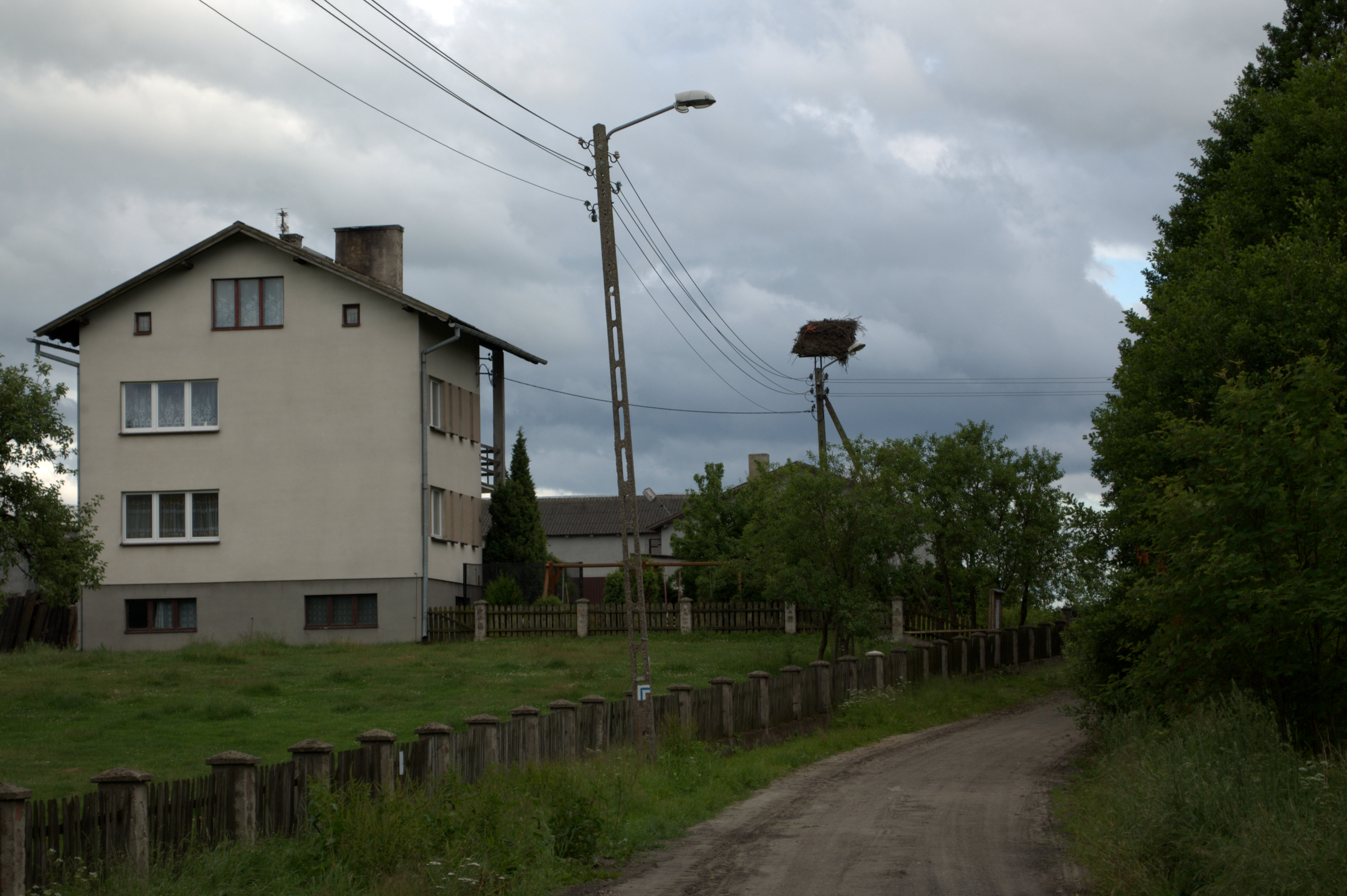

- Location within Poland
- Coordinates: 53°57′13″N 17°44′6″E
- Country: Poland
- Voivodeship: Pomeranian
- County: Chojnice
- Gmina: Brusy
- Population: 263

Orlik [ˈɔrlik] (Kashubian: Òrlik) is a village in the administrative district of Gmina Brusy, within Chojnice County, Pomeranian Voivodeship, in northern Poland.

For details of the history of the region, see History of Pomerania.
