= Orlik (surname) =

Orlik (Czech version: Orlík) is a Slavic surname literally meaning 'little eagle'. Notable people with the surname include:

- Anna Orlik (born 1993), Belarusian tennis player
- Curdin Orlik (born 1993), Swiss wrestler
- Edmund Roman Orlik (1918–1982), Polish tank ace
- Peter Orlik (born 1938), American mathematician
- Kazimierz Orlik-Łukoski (1890–1940), Polish military commander
- Wilhelm Orlik-Rueckemann (1894–1986), Polish military commander
