= Orlik, Russia =

Orlik (Russian: Орлик) is the name of several rural localities in Russia:

- Orlik, Belgorod Oblast, a selo in Chernyansky District of Belgorod Oblast
- Orlik, Republic of Buryatia, a selo in Orliksky somon of Okinsky District of the Republic of Buryatia
- Orlik, Oryol Oblast, a settlement in Obraztsovsky Selsoviet of Orlovsky District of Oryol Oblast
- Orlik, Solovyevskaya Rural Administration, Chernsky District, Tula Oblast, a settlement in Solovyevskaya Rural Administration of Chernsky District of Tula Oblast
- Orlik, Velyenikolskaya Rural Administration, Chernsky District, Tula Oblast, a village in Velyenikolskaya Rural Administration of Chernsky District of Tula Oblast
