= Tupolev ANT-3 =

USSR Reconnaissance plane

ANT-3
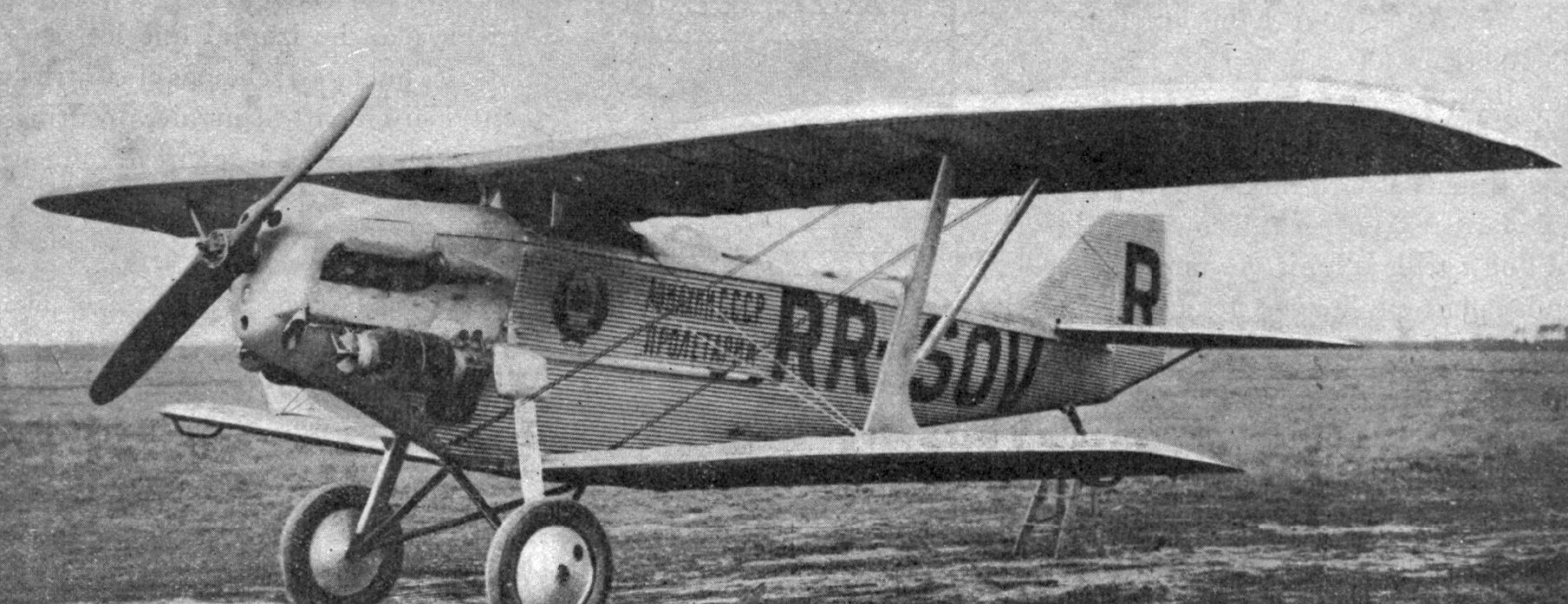

General information
- Type: Reconnaissance aircraft
- National origin: Soviet Union
- Manufacturer: Tupolev
- Number built: 103

History
- Manufactured: 1926–1929
- First flight: 6 August 1925
- Variants: Tupolev ANT-10

The ANT-3 was a Soviet all-metal aircraft designed by the Tupolev Design Bureau. Tupolev acquired much experience in building his first two aircraft, later using his experience to construct the ANT-3. By this time, Soviet Air Force leaders were convinced that metal was a highly usable substance in the building of airplanes. Tupolev therefore guided AGOS- TsAGI in creating the first Soviet all-metal aircraft. The ANT-3 was Tupolev's first practical aircraft.

== Construction and Development ==
On 1 August 1924, design work started for the ANT-3, by the following July the prototype was completed at the AGOS factory. The sesquiplane ANT-3 first flew on 6 August 1925, piloted by V. N. Fillipov, a TsAGI test-pilot. The VVS (Voenno-Vozdushnye Sily - military air forces) ordered several ANT-3s, designated R-3 (R - Razvedchik - reconnaissance), after successful flight tests led by Mikhail Gromov. However, production was limited by the shortage of raw materials, but those that were produced proved useful for propaganda purposes.

== Production ==
The ANT-3 was produced between 1926 and 1928 at GAZ-5 (GAZ - Gosudarstvenny Aviatsionnyy Zavod – state aviation plant/factory) in Moscow and, from late 1928, at GAZ-22. 102 units were probably produced in total.

== Design ==
The ANT-3 was a sesquiplane seating two in tandem cockpits, with the pilot in front and gunner behind. The structure was predominantly built from light alloys with corrugated kol'choogaluminly skin. Lower main-planes were attached to the lower fuselage, whilst the upper mainplane was supported on short cabane struts. Wire bracing and streamlined 'V' interplane struts provided structural integrity.

The single-engined ANT-3 could be powered by a range of engines from 300–500 kW (400–670 hp); the prototype used a 298 kW (400 hp) Liberty, the second aircraft was powered by a 336 kW (451 hp) Napier Lion; the first 79 production aircraft used the 336 kW (451 hp) Lorraine-Dietrich 12E; 21 aircraft used the 336 kW (451 hp) Mikulin M-5 and one used a 373 kW (500 hp) BMW VI.

Tupolev proposed an upgraded version, to be powered by a 373 kW (500 hp) Mikulin engine, with a range of about 966 km (600 mi; 522 nmi). One was built with a Lorraine-Dietrich engine, delivered to Aeroflot's Yakutsk division, designated PS-3 and used as a mail-plane until about 1930.

== Operational history ==
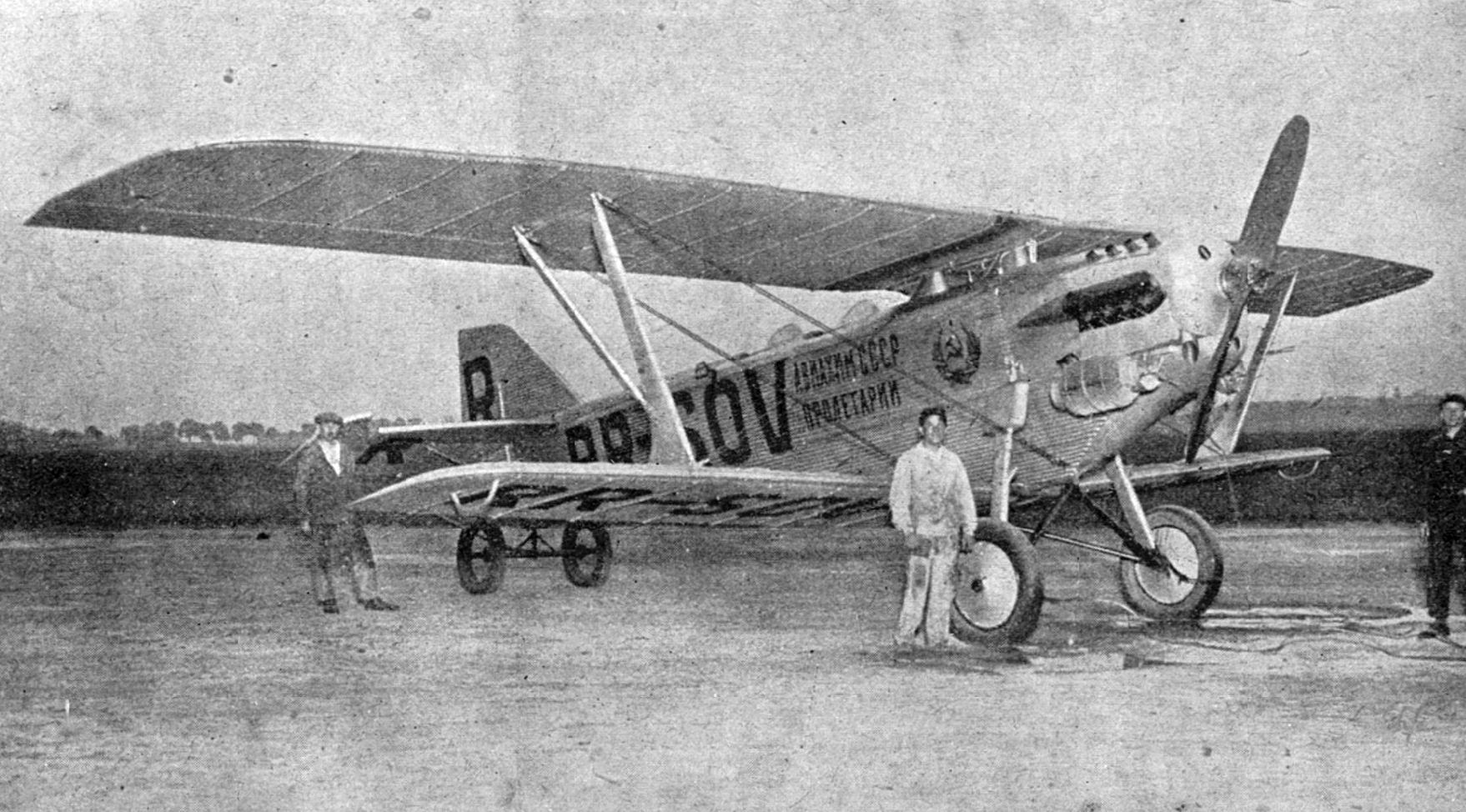
Tupolev R-3NL RR-SOV photo from L'Aérophile September,1926

The R-3, used by the military for reconnaissance, was also used for propaganda purposes with long-distance flights.

In the summer of 1926 the prototype R-3NL, named Proletariy (En:proletarian) and registered RR-SOV, piloted by Mikhail Gromov, assisted by mechanic Yevgeny Radzevich, flew a round Europe flight: Moscow - Königsberg - Berlin - Paris - Rome - Vienna - Prague - Warsaw - Moscow; After flying for about 120 km (75 mi; 65 nmi), a coolant expansion tank suffered fatigue failures, spraying water around the cockpit. Gromov returned to Moscow and newspapers stated that he and Radzevich turned back due to poor weather. The incident caused Tupolev to recommend that the tank have a convex base, which was adopted. Gromov resumed his expedition landing at Königsberg, by which point the radiator was leaking. Gromov proceeded to Berlin where mechanics were unable to repair the radiator. Moving on, they flew on to Paris, where a mechanic found that some putty sealant had separated. To solve the problem, he took another aircraft's radiator, adapting it to fit in the ANT-3, after which Gromov and Radzevich flew off to Rome. Later Gromov and Radzevich flew north to Vienna, but the sun started to set and it was dark when they were just 19 km (12 mi; 10 nmi) from Vienna. Gromov decided to risk landing in Vienna, where campfires were lit around the airport to illuminate the landing strip. The remainder of the flight was largely uneventful other than overflying Prague to continue to Warsaw. By their return to Moscow they had flown a distance of 7,150 km (4,440 mi; 3,860 nmi) in 34 hours 15 minutes flying time at an average speed of 210 km/h (130 mph; 110 kn), for a new national long-distance speed record.

The second production ANT-3M-5, registered RR-INT and named Nash Otvet (En:Our Answer), was flown by S.A. Shestakov and D.F Fufayev from Moscow to Tokyo and return, via Sarapul, Omsk, Novosibirsk, Krasnoyarsk, Irkutsk, Verkhneudinsk, Chita, Nerchinsk, Blagoveshchensk, Spassk, Nanyuan and Yokohama, taking 12 days, covering 22,000 km (14,000 mi) in 153 hours flying time. The flight was titled "The Great Eastern Overflight"

== Variants ==
ANT-3
Prototype, powered by a 298 kW (400 hp) Liberty L-8 engine.
R-3
Original production military reconnaissance aircraft powered by Mikulin M-5 engines; 21 built.
R-3LD
79 production aircraft fitted with 336 kW (451 hp) Lorraine-Dietrich 12Eb engines.
R-3NL
Second prototype, powered by a 336 kW (451 hp) Napier Lion engine; RR-SOV Proletariy (Proletarian).
R-7
Improved derivative of the R-3, powered by a 373 kW (500 hp) BMW VI engine. A single prototype was built, also known as the ANT-10.
PS-3
Designation for 30 R-3s that were modified into mailplanes for service with Aeroflot.

== Operators ==
Soviet Union

- Soviet Air Force

== Specifications (R-3LD) ==
Data from The Osprey Encyclopedia of Russian Aircraft 1875–1995

General characteristics

- Crew: 2
- Length: 9.885 m (32 ft 5 in)
- Wingspan: 13.02 m (42 ft 9 in)
- Height: 3.05 m (10 ft 0 in)
- Wing area: 37 m^{2} (400 sq ft)
- Empty weight: 1,340 kg (2,954 lb)
- Gross weight: 2,090 kg (4,608 lb)
- Powerplant: 1 × Lorraine-Dietrich 12Eb W-12 water-cooled piston engine, 340 kW (450 hp)
- Propellers: 2-bladed wooden fixed pitch propeller

Performance

- Maximum speed: 204 km/h (127 mph, 110 kn)
- Range: 880 km (550 mi, 480 nmi)
- Service ceiling: 4,920 m (16,140 ft)

Armament

== See also ==
Related lists

- List of Interwar military aircraft

== Bibliography ==
- Lawrence, Joseph (1945). The Observer's Book Of Airplanes. London and New York: Frederick Warne & Co.
