= Diethelm von Eichel-Streiber =

German World War II fighter pilot

- Born: 10 August 1914; Oppershausen, Kingdom of Prussia
- Died: 13 May 1996 (aged 81); Bonn, Germany
- Military career
- Allegiance: Nazi Germany
- Branch: Luftwaffe
- Service years: 1935–1945
- Rank: Major (Wehrmacht); Oberst (Bundeswehr)
- Units: Condor Legion, JG 52, JG 77, JG 1, JG 5, JG 51, JG 27, JV 44
- Conflicts: See battles: Spanish Civil War; World War II Battle of France Balkans Campaign Invasion of Crete Eastern Front Operation Barbarossa Battles of Rzhev Operation Donnerkeil Defense of the Reich
- Awards: Spanish Cross in Gold with Swords; Knight's Cross of the Iron Cross
- Other work: Volkswagen dealer

Diethelm von Eichel-Streiber (10 August 1914 – 13 May 1996) was a German Luftwaffe officer in the Spanish Civil War and World War II. During the Spanish Civil War, he flew with Kampfgruppe 88 of the Condor Legion as an air observer. During World War II, he became a fighter ace credited with 96 aerial victories. With the exception of two aerial victories claimed over the Western Allies, the majority of his aerial victories were achieved on the Eastern Front. After World War II, he joined the German Air Force and later worked as an automobile dealer in the United States. Eichel-Streiber died on 13 May 1996 in Bonn, Germany.

== Early life and career ==
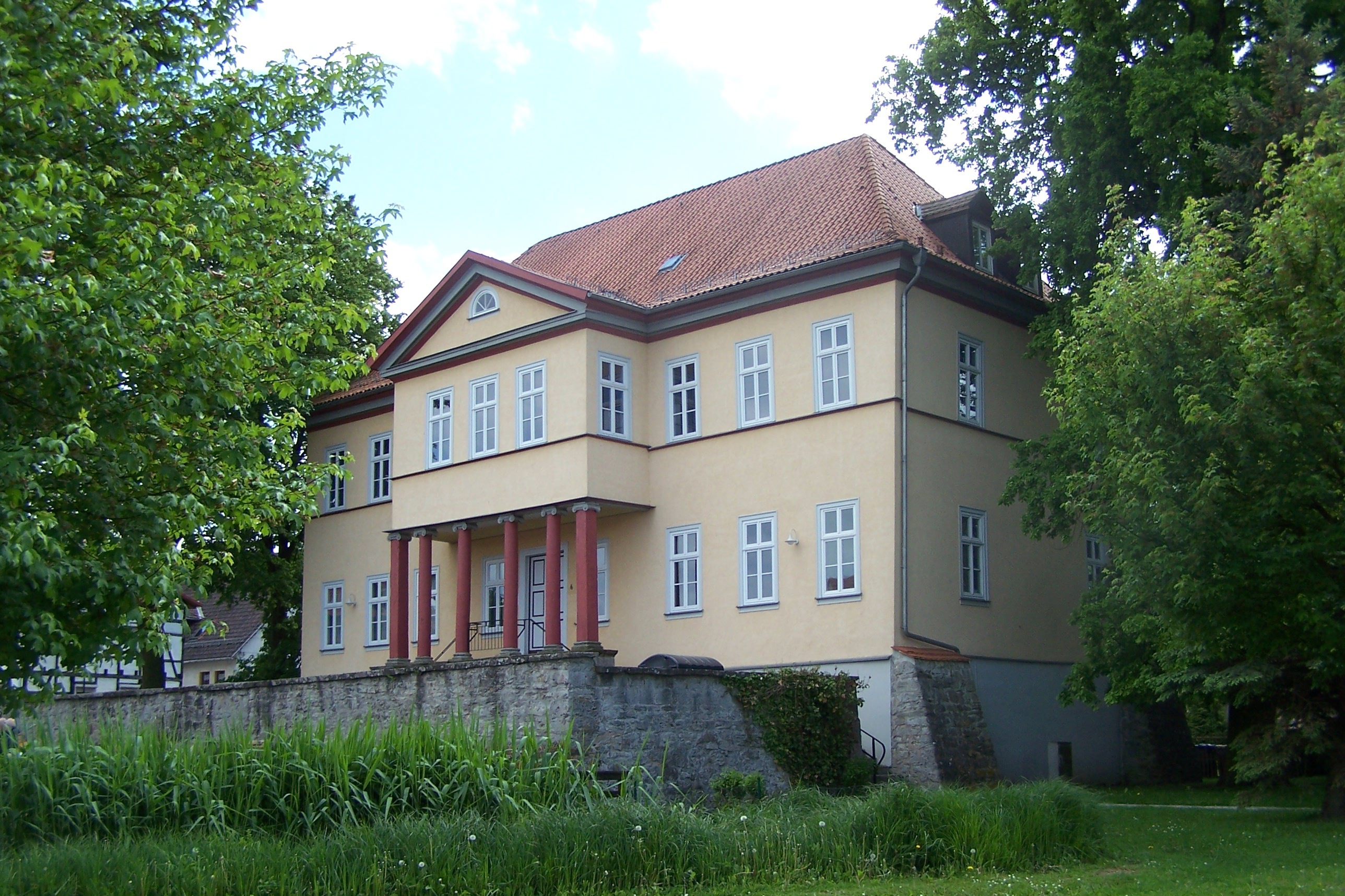
Family estate

Eichel-Streiber was born on 10 August 1914 in Oppershausen, at the time in the Province of Saxony within the German Empire, present-day Thuringia. He was one of eight children of Heinrich von Eichel-Streiber, a German politician and owner of the family estate in Berka vor dem Hainich, and his mother Hildegard von der Leyen zu Bloemersheim.

In 1935, Eichel-Streiber joined the military service of the Luftwaffe. In November 1937, he volunteered for service in the Condor Legion and was posted to Kampfgruppe 88 as an air observer on a Heinkel He 111. On 14 April 1939, he was awarded the Spanish Cross in Gold with Swords (Spanienkreuz in Gold mit Schwertern), for his service in the Spanish Civil War.

== World War II ==
In November 1940, Eichel-Streiber was posted to III. Gruppe of Jagdgeschwader 77 (JG 77th—77th Fighter Wing) where he served as an adjutant to his commanding officer and uncle Major Alexander von Winterfeldt. JG 77 had just been ordered to relocate from Norway to airfields near the English Channel. The Gruppenstab (headquarters unit) of III. Gruppe arrived in Dinan in northwestern France on 11 December. In preparation for Operation Marita, the Geschwaderstab, II. and III. Gruppe of JG 77 transferred to Deta in western Romania on 1 April 1941, completing the relocation by 4 April. German forces invaded Greece and Yugoslavia on 6 April. That day, III. Gruppe flew fighter escort missions for Junkers Ju 87 dive bombers from Sturzkampfgeschwader 77 (StG 77—77th Dive Bomber Wing) attacking Belgrade. The next day, the Gruppe was ordered to an airfield named Sofia-Vrba located approximately halfway between Radomir and Sofia to augment the VIII. Fliegerkorps (8th Air Corps) commanded by Generaloberst Wolfram Freiherr von Richthofen. The Gruppe then followed the German advance to Skopje on 10 April. On 14 April, III. Gruppe moved to Prilep and then to Axioupoli followed by another relocation to Korinos on 16 April. On 19 April, operating from Korinos, III. Gruppe flew close air support missions. During an attack on the Dadion airfield at Amfikleia, Eichel-Streiber strafed and destroyed two Gloster Gladiator biplane fighters. The Gruppe then moved to Larissa on 20 April, from Larissa to Almyros on 22 April, and from Almyros to Tanagra on 27 April. The fighting in Greece ceased on 30 April and JG 77 was given a period of rest.

In preparation for the Battle of Crete, III. Gruppe was ordered to Molaoi on 11 May. The Gruppe flew its first combat missions to Crete on 14 May, attacking the airfield at Maleme. During this early morning attack, Eichel-Streiber claimed his first aerial victory when he shot down a Hawker Hurricane fighter. Later that day, the Gruppe flew a second mission to Crete. During this mission, Eichel-Streiber's Messerschmitt Bf 109 E-7 (Werknummer 6435—factory number) was hit by anti-aircraft artillery, tearing off his left horizontal stabiliser and damaging his vertical stabilizer, resulting in a forced landing at Maloi.

=== Operation Barbarossa and squadron leader ===
In preparation for Operation Barbarossa, the German invasion of the Soviet Union, III. Gruppe was moved to Bucharest and was located in the sector of Heeresgruppe Süd (Army Group South). III. Gruppe arrived in Bucharest on 16 June. Four days later, III. Gruppe moved to Roman. That evening, the pilots and ground crews were briefed of the upcoming invasion of the Soviet Union, which opened the Eastern Front on 22 June. On 26 June, III. Gruppe flew seven combat missions. On the fifth mission of the day, a fighter escort mission for He 111 bombers from Kampfgeschwader 27 (KG 27—27th Bomber Wing), the flight encountered 25 Soviet Tupolev SB and 10 Ilyushin DB-3 bombers. During this engagement, Eichel-Streiber claimed four bombers shot down, taking his total to five aerial victories.

On 29 December 1941, Eichel-Streiber was appointed Staffelkapitän (squadron leader) of 1. Staffel of the Ergänzungsgruppe of Jagdgeschwader 2 "Richthofen" (JG 2—2nd Fighter Wing), a supplementary training group. At the time, the Staffel was based in Döberitz before moving to Bergen aan Zee on 7 January 1942. In January 1942, the Staffel became part of the newly formed IV. Gruppe of Jagdgeschwader 1 (JG 1—1st Fighter Wing) where it thus became 10. Staffel of JG 1. IV. Gruppe first major task was Operation Donnerkeil, an air superiority operation to support the Kriegsmarine's (German Navy) Operation Cerberus. The objective of this assignment was to give the German battleships Scharnhorst and Gneisenau and the heavy cruiser Prinz Eugen fighter protection in the breakout from Brest to Germany. End-February to early March 1942, IV. Gruppe began relocating north to Trondheim. On 21 March, IV./JG 1 was renamed to III. Gruppe of Jagdgeschwader 5 (JG 5—5th Fighter Wing) and placed under the command of Hauptmann Günther Scholz. During this reassignment, Eichel-Streiber's Staffel became a newly formed 1. Staffel of JG 5 subordinated to I. Gruppe. On 4 May, Eichel-Streiber was posted to the Gruppenstab of II. Gruppe of Jagdgeschwader 26 "Schlageter" (JG 26—26th Fighter Wing). He was replaced by Oberleutnant Wolfgang Kosse who had been transferred from JG 26.

=== With Jagdgeschwader 51 ===
In early October 1942, II. Gruppe of Jagdgeschwader 51 (JG 51—51st Fighter Wing) was withdrawn from the Eastern Front and sent to Jesau, near present-day Bagrationovsk, to Heiligenbeil, present-day Mamonovo, to be reequipped with the Focke-Wulf Fw 190 A. While undergoing training on this aircraft, the Gruppe received orders on 4 November to transfer to the Mediterranean theatre flying the Bf 109 again. 6. Staffel was exempt from this order, was detached from II. Gruppe, and continued its training on the Fw 190. In late November, 6. Staffel was renamed to Stabsstaffel (headquarters squadron) of JG 51 and placed under the command of von Eichel-Streiber on 30 November. Alternatively, the Stabsstaffel was also referred to as Geschwaderstabsstaffel z.b.V., roughly translating to fighter wing squadron for special deployment'. The abbreviation z. b. V. is German and stands for zur besonderen Verwendung (for special deployment).

The Stabsstaffel transferred to the Eastern Front again on 5 February 1943 where it was based at an airfield at Smolensk. On 4 March, the Stabsstaffel flew missions in support of elements of the 9th Army fighting east and northeast of Bely during the Battles of Rzhev. That day, the Stabsstaffel claimed seven aerial victories including an Ilyushin Il-2 ground-attack aircraft claimed shot down by Eichel-Streiber. The Stabsstaffel was tasked with providing fighter protection of the Smolensk airfield on 15 March. Shortly after sundown, Eichel-Streiber led a flight of Fw 190 fighters against six Il-2 ground-attack aircraft and their fighter escort. In the encounter east of Demidov, Eichel-Streiber claimed one of the attacking Il-2 aircraft shot down.

On the first day of the Battle of Kursk, 5 July 1943, the Stabsstaffel relocated from Smolensk to Oryol where it fought over the northern face of the salient.

On 11 September, Eichel-Streiber made a forced landing in his Fw 190 A-6 (Werknummer 530333) due to engine failure of the aircraft. Injured in the landing, he went on home-leave for a period of rest and convalescence. During his absence, he was replaced by Hauptmann Wolfram Philipps.

=== Group commander ===
Eichel-Streiber was appointed Gruppenkommandeur (group commander) of III. Gruppe of JG 51 on 1 April 1944. He succeeded Hauptmann Fritz Losigkeit in this capacity who was made Geschwaderkommodore (wing commander) of JG 51 the day before. Command of the Stabsstaffel was then temporarily passed to Leutnant Herbert Friebel before Hauptmann Edwin Thiel took command in May 1944. At the time. III. Gruppe was converting back from the Fw 190 to the Bf 109 at Dęblin–Irena. On 5 April, Eichel-Streiber was awarded the Knight's Cross of the Iron Cross (Ritterkreuz des Eisernen Kreuzes).

On 24 April, elements of III. Gruppe began relocating to Terespol where the Geschwaderstab (headquarters unit) and I. Gruppe of JG 51 were based, fighting predominantly in the combat area of Kovel. The relocation was completed by 15 May. The Gruppe moved to Babruysk on 21 June and the following day, Soviet Forces launched Operation Bagration (22 June – 19 August) which nearly annihilated Army Group Centre. On 21 June, bombers of the Eighth Air Force on a shuttle bombing mission of Operation Frantic, attacked oil refineries south of Berlin before heading for the Poltava Air Base. The bombers were intercepted by elements of JG 51 led by Losigkeit. In this encounter, two of the escorting North American P-51 Mustang fighters were shot down. One of the P-51 fighters crashed near the Luftwaffe airfield at Babruysk where III. Gruppe was based. In its cockpit, a map of the Poltava Air Base was found. Eichel-Streiber sent the map to the headquarters of Luftflotte 6 (6th Air Fleet). This intelligence led to an attack by Luftwaffe bombers which destroyed 44 parked Boeing B-17 Flying Fortress bombers and damaged further 26.

On 24 June, the Soviet Air Forces fielded 4,500 combat missions over the combat area of Army Group Centre while Luftflotte 6 flew 111 ground attack and 150 fighter missions, creating a 1:15 discrepancy. That day, III. Gruppe flew several missions in the combat area south and southeast of Babruysk. During these missions, Eichel-Streiber claimed an Il-2 ground-attack aircraft on a morning mission south of Parichi and another Il-2 later in the afternoon east of Babruysk.

On 25 August 1944, Eichel-Streiber was transferred and appointed Gruppenkommandeur of I. Gruppe of Jagdgeschwader 27 (JG 27—27th Fighter Wing). Command of his former III. Gruppe of JG 51 was passed on to Hauptmann Joachim Brendel. At the time, I. Gruppe of JG 27 had just been withdrawn from combat operation in France and was based at Hoya for a brief period of rest and replenishment. Following training, the Gruppe moved to an airfield at Riesa-Leutewitz and flew its first combat mission against the Eighth Air Force on 2 November. On 28 November, Eichel-Streiber claimed his 96th and last aerial victory, a Republic P-47 Thunderbolt fighter near Aachen. On 1 December, Eichel-Streiber was transferred to IX. Fliegerkorps (9th Air Corps) where he was tasked with leading the conversion training of bomber pilots to fighter pilots.

Promoted to Major (major) in April 1945, Eichel-Streiber joined Adolf Galland's Jagdverband 44 (JV 44—44th Fighter Detachment) at Munich-Riem. JV 44 was equipped with the Messerschmitt Me 262 jet fighter, an aircraft which was heavily armed and faster than any Allied fighter. Galland hoped that the Me 262 would compensate for the numerical superiority of the Allies. Eichel-Streiber was not credited with any aerial victories flying the Me 262.

== Later life ==
Following World War II, Eichel-Streiber joined the military service in the German Air Force, at the time referred to as the Bundesluftwaffe of the Bundeswehr. Before retiring in 1960, he attained the rank of Oberst (colonel). Eichel-Streiber then moved to Modesto, California in the United States where he ran a Volkswagen dealership. He died on 13 May 1996 at the age of 81 in Bonn, Germany.

== Summary of career ==
=== Aerial victory claims ===
According to US historian David T. Zabecki, von Eichel-Streiber was credited with 96 aerial victories. Spick also lists von Eichel-Streiber with 96 aerial victories claimed in an unknown number combat missions. This figure includes 94 aerial victories on the Eastern Front, and further two victories over the Western Allies. Mathews and Foreman, authors of Luftwaffe Aces — Biographies and Victory Claims, researched the German Federal Archives and found records for 91 aerial victory claims, plus three further unconfirmed claims. This figure includes 90 claims on the Eastern Front and one over the Western Allies.

Victory claims were logged to a map-reference (PQ = Planquadrat), for example "PQ 35 Ost 36121". The Luftwaffe grid map (Jägermeldenetz) covered all of Europe, western Russia and North Africa and was composed of rectangles measuring 15 minutes of latitude by 30 minutes of longitude, an area of about 360 square miles (930 km^{2}). These sectors were then subdivided into 36 smaller units to give a location area 3 km × 4 km (1.9 mi × 2.5 mi) in size.

Chronicle of aerial victories
This and the ♠ (Ace of spades) indicates those aerial victories which made von Eichel-Streiber an "ace-in-a-day", a term which designates a fighter pilot who has shot down five or more airplanes in a single day. This and the – (dash) indicates unconfirmed aerial victory claims for which von Eichel-Streiber did not receive credit. This and the ? (question mark) indicates information discrepancies listed by Prien, Stemmer, Rodeike, Balke, Bock, Mathews and Foreman.
Claim	Date	Time	Type	Location	Claim	Date	Time	Type	Location
– Stab III. Gruppe of Jagdgeschwader 77 – Balkans and Crete — 1 April – 1 June 1941
1	14 May 1941	06:31	Hurricane	Maleme					
– Stab III. Gruppe of Jagdgeschwader 77 – Operation Barbarossa — 22 June – 5 December 1941
2	26 June 1941	10:53	DB-3	vicinity of Iași	4	26 June 1941	10:55	DB-3	vicinity of Iași
3	26 June 1941	10:54	DB-3	vicinity of Iași	5	26 June 1941	10:56	DB-3	vicinity of Iași
– Stabsstaffel of Jagdgeschwader 51 – Eastern Front — 1 January – 31 December 1943
6	4 March 1943	16:05	Il-2	PQ 35 Ost 36121, southwest of Olenino; 20 km (12 mi) northeast of Bely	37	18 August 1943	18:36	Il-2 m.H. (Note: The "m.H." refers to an Ilyushin Il-2 with rear gunner (mit Heckschütze).)	25 km (16 mi) southwest of Spas-Demensk
7	15 March 1943	17:10	Il-2	PQ 35 Ost 16851, east of Demidov; 20 km (12 mi) southeast of Demidov	38	18 August 1943	18:37	Il-2 m.H.	25 km (16 mi) southwest of Spas-Demensk
8	16 March 1943	16:08	La-5	PQ 35 Ost 16461, northeast of Demidov; 30 km (19 mi) east-southeast of Maklok	39	18 August 1943	18:40	Il-2 m.H.	PQ 35 Ost 35681; 20 km (12 mi) west-southwest of Utrikowo
9	28 May 1943	11:18? (Note: According to Mathews and Foreman claimed at 11:08.)	La-5	PQ 35 Ost 63154, southeast of Oryol; 15 km (9.3 mi) southeast of Oryol	40	19 August 1943	09:33	Il-2 m.H.	PQ 35 Ost 35645, southwest of Spas-Demensk; 25 km (16 mi) west of Spas-Demensk
10	30 May 1943	07:10	MiG-3	PQ 35 Ost 63554, Ponyri; 15 km (9.3 mi) west of Maloarkhangelsk	41	19 August 1943	09:34	Il-2 m.H.	PQ 35 Ost 35654, southwest of Spas-Demensk; 25 km (16 mi) west of Spas-Demensk
11	30 May 1943	07:24	P-39	PQ 35 Ost 63551, Ponyri; 20 km (12 mi) southwest of Maloarkhangelsk	42	19 August 1943	17:49	Il-2 m.H.	42 km (26 mi) southwest of Spas-Demensk; 25 km (16 mi) west of Spas-Demensk
12	8 June 1943	12:33	LaGG-3	PQ 35 Ost 6359, southeast of Oryol; 25 km (16 mi) northeast of Gorodok	43	20 August 1943	15:22	Il-2 m.H.	7 km (4.3 mi) southwest of Spas-Demensk
13	8 June 1943	19:07	LaGG-3	PQ 35 Ost 63172, southeast of Oryol; 10 km (6.2 mi) west of Zmiyovka	44	20 August 1943	15:28	Il-2	17 km (11 mi) west-northwest of Spas-Demensk
14	8 June 1943	19:15	Yak-1	PQ 35 Ost 63122, northeast of Oryol; 10 km (6.2 mi) east of Oryol	45	20 August 1943	15:33	Il-2 m.H.	PQ 35 Ost 35653, southwest of Spas-Demensk; 25 km (16 mi) west of Spas-Demensk
15	8 June 1943	19:27	La-5	PQ 35 Ost 64821, southeast of Oryol; 15 km (9.3 mi) southeast of Mtsensk	46	28 August 1943	11:50	Pe-2	PQ 35 Ost 43821, northeast of Sevsk; 15 km (9.3 mi) east of Sevsk
16	28 June 1943	07:05	Il-2	PQ 35 Ost 63511, south of Oryol; 10 km (6.2 mi) east of Trosna	47	1 September 1943	11:17	MiG-3	PQ 35 Ost 35362, northeast of Yelnya; 20 km (12 mi) east-northeast of Yelnya
17	6 July 1943	09:40	La-5	PQ 35 Ost 54882, west of Oryol; 15 km (9.3 mi) northeast of Naryshkino	48	1 September 1943	18:13	Il-2 m.H.	PQ 35 Ost 25492, west of Yelnya; 20 km (12 mi) west of Yelnya
18	8 July 1943	09:34	Il-2 m.H.	PQ 35 Ost 63698, north of Fatesh; 20 km (12 mi) south-southwest of Trosna	49	2 September 1943	11:10	Il-2 m.H.	PQ 35 Ost 25495, west-southwest of Yelnya; 20 km (12 mi) west of Yelnya
19	9 July 1943	12:13	Il-2 m.H.	PQ 35 Ost 63585, northeast of Ponyri; 20 km (12 mi) southwest of Maloarkhangelsk	50	2 September 1943	11:12	Il-2	PQ 35 Ost 25492, west of Yelnya; 20 km (12 mi) west of Yelnya
20	10 July 1943	13:00? (Note: According to Mathews and Foreman claimed at 13:01.)	MiG-3	PQ 35 Ost 63556, northeast of Ponyri; 15 km (9.3 mi) west of Maloarkhangelsk	51	5 September 1943	18:02	Yak-9	south-southwest of Dukhovshchina
21	12 July 1943	08:56	MiG-3	PQ 35 Ost 63233, northwest of Novosil; 20 km (12 mi) east of Zalegoshch	52	11 September 1943	09:58	MiG-3	northwest of Bryansk
22	13 July 1943	09:44	P-39	PQ 35 Ost 63254, east of Oryol; 15 km (9.3 mi) southeast of Zalegoshch	53	20 October 1943	15:09	Il-2 m.H.	north-northwest of Radul
23	13 July 1943	09:48	P-39	southeast of Novossil	54	28 October 1943	12:50	Boston	southeast of Rechytsa
24	14 July 1943	18:30	MiG-3	PQ 35 Ost 64859, east of Oryol; 20 km (12 mi) southeast of Mtsensk	55	6 November 1943	09:42	Yak-7	Nevel
25	19 July 1943	11:35	Il-2 m.H.	PQ 35 Ost 63136, southeast of Oryol; 10 km (6.2 mi) west of Zalegoshch	56	10 November 1943	12:21	Il-2 m.H.	south of Nevel
26	20 July 1943	14:37	MiG-3	PQ 35 Ost 64799, east of Oryol; 15 km (9.3 mi) northwest of Zalegoshch	57	11 November 1943	13:44	Il-2 m.H.	east of Vitebsk
27	20 July 1943	14:45	MiG-3	PQ 35 Ost 63133, vicinity of Oryol; 10 km (6.2 mi) west of Zalegoshch	58	8 December 1943	13:40	R-10 (Seversky)	south of Zhlobin
28	3 August 1943	18:41	Il-2 m.H.	PQ 35 Ost 54753, east of Karachev; 25 km (16 mi) northwest of Bolkhov	59	12 December 1943	12:15	Yak-9	PQ 25 Ost 93426, southwest of Zhlobin; 20 km (12 mi) east-southeast of Parichi
29	3 August 1943	18:43	Il-2 m.H.	PQ 35 Ost 54565, northeast of Karachev; 20 km (12 mi) southeast of Dudorovskiy	60♠	15 December 1943	08:20	Il-2 m.H.	PQ 35 Ost 03179, southeast of Zhlobin; 10 km (6.2 mi) south of Zhlobin
30	4 August 1943	11:43	LaGG-3	PQ 35 Ost 53264, southwest of Oryol; 15 km (9.3 mi) southwest of Oryol	61♠	15 December 1943	10:06	Yak-9	PQ 25 Ost 93294; 15 km (9.3 mi) southwest of Zhlobin
31	4 August 1943	15:20	Yak-1	PQ 35 Ost 54753, east of Karachev; 15 km (9.3 mi) southwest of Znamenskoye	62♠	15 December 1943	10:10	Il-2 m.H.	PQ 25 Ost 93434, southwest of Zhlobin; 20 km (12 mi) south-southwest of Zhlobin
32	4 August 1943	18:27	LaGG-3	PQ 35 Ost 54573, north of Karachev; 20 km (12 mi) west-northwest of Znamenskoye	63♠	15 December 1943	10:10	Il-2	PQ 25 Ost 93431, southwest of Zhlobin; 20 km (12 mi) south-southwest of Zhlobin
33	11 August 1943	11:21	Il-2	30 km (19 mi) northwest of Spas-Demensk	64♠	15 December 1943	10:14	Il-2 m.H.	PQ 25 Ost 93423, southwest of Zhlobin; 20 km (12 mi) east-southeast of Parichi
34	11 August 1943	14:38	Il-2 m.H.	PQ 35 Ost 45512, north of Spas-Demensk; 20 km (12 mi) north of Spas-Demensk	65♠	15 December 1943	10:14	Il-2 m.H.	PQ 25 Ost 93423, southwest of Zhlobin; 20 km (12 mi) east-southeast of Parichi
35	11 August 1943	16:04	Il-2 m.H.	22 km (14 mi) northwest of Spas-Demensk	— ? (Note: This claim is not listed by Prien, Stemmer, Rodeike and Bock.)	15 December 1943	—	Il-2	
36	11 August 1943	17:09? (Note: According to Mathews and Foreman claimed at 17:29.)	Il-2	PQ 35 Ost 45526, northeast of Spas-Demensk; 10 km (6.2 mi) northeast of Utrikowo	— ?	15 December 1943	—	Il-2	
– Stabsstaffel of Jagdgeschwader 51 – Eastern Front — 1 January – 30 April 1944
66	10 January 1944	11:14	Il-2	PQ 25 Ost 93644, northeast of Kalinkavichy; 40 km (25 mi) north-northeast of Mazyr	69	12 January 1944	12:04	Pe-2	PQ 25 Ost 93644, northeast of Kalinkavichy; 40 km (25 mi) north-northeast of Mazyr
67	10 January 1944	11:16	Il-2	PQ 25 Ost 93641, northeast of Kalinkavichy; 20 km (12 mi) north-northeast of Pyetrykaw	70	3 April 1944	09:11	Yak-9	PQ 25 Ost 42814, west of Kovel; 40 km (25 mi) east-southeast of Kovel
68	10 January 1944	11:18	Yak-9	PQ 25 Ost 93564, northeast of Kalinkavichy; 40 km (25 mi) north-northeast of Mazyr	71	3 April 1944	09:12	Yak-9	PQ 25 Ost 42739, west-southwest of Kovel vicinity of Liuboml
– Stab III. Gruppe of Jagdgeschwader 51 – Eastern Front — 1 May – 24 August 1944
72	24 June 1944	10:28	Il-2 m.H.	PQ 25 Ost 93339, south of Parichi; 10 km (6.2 mi) south of Parichi	82	30 July 1944	15:45	Il-2 m.H.	PQ 25 Ost 35448; 15–20 km (9.3–12.4 mi) northeast of Marijampolė
73	24 June 1944	15:22? (Note: According to Mathews and Foreman claimed as a Bell P-39 Airacobra at 15:32.)	Il-2 m.H.?	PQ 25 Ost 94859, east of Babruysk; 20 km (12 mi) west of Rahachow	83	1 August 1944	18:00	Yak-9	PQ 25 Ost 35396 vicinity of Marijampolė
74	25 June 1944	08:27? (Note: According to Mathews and Foreman claimed at 08:22.)	Yak-7	PQ 25 Ost 93178, east of Babruysk; 20 km (12 mi) west of Parichi	84	2 August 1944	15:00	Il-2 m.H.	PQ 25 Ost 24296; 5 km (3.1 mi) southwest of Augustow
75	4 July 1944	10:51	Yak-7	PQ 25 Ost 62118, south of Pinsk; 25 km (16 mi) north-northwest of Kursk	85	4 August 1944	09:01	Il-2 m.H.	PQ 25 Ost 24293; 5 km (3.1 mi) southwest of Augustów
76	9 July 1944	17:57	Yak-9	PQ 25 Ost 55319, west-northwest of Vilnius; 25 km (16 mi) east-northeast of Mosalsk	86	11 August 1944	18:13	Il-2 m.H.	PQ 25 Ost 34511; 25 km (16 mi) west-northwest of Scholka
77	17 July 1944	18:57	Yak-9	PQ 25 Ost 50175, west-northwest of Brody; 15 km (9.3 mi) east of Zolochiv	87	13 August 1944	19:23	La-5	PQ 25 Ost 24536; 15 km (9.3 mi) northeast of Łomża
78	18 July 1944	18:23	P-39	PQ 25 Ost 41737, northwest of Lviv; 30 km (19 mi) northeast of Zhovkva	88	14 August 1944	09:27	Il-2 m.H.	PQ 25 Ost 24566; 25 km (16 mi) northeast of Łomża
79	29 July 1944	17:23	Il-2 m.H.	PQ 25 Ost 35686; 20 km (12 mi) southwest of Olyka	89	17 August 1944	09:34	La-5	PQ 25 Ost 36371; 20 km (12 mi) northeast of Nemakščiai
80	30 July 1944	12:22	Yak-9	PQ 25 Ost 35756; 15 km (9.3 mi) west-northwest of Berżniki	90	17 August 1944	16:30	Yak-9	PQ 25 Ost 36179; 20 km (12 mi) southwest of Schaulen
81	30 July 1944	12:27	Yak-9	PQ 25 Ost 35848 to 25847; 10 km (6.2 mi) northeast of Berżniki	91	24 August 1944	16:17	Il-2 m.H.	PQ 25 Ost 27636; 60 km (37 mi) south-southwest of Tukums
– Stab I. Gruppe of Jagdgeschwader 27 – Defense of the Reich — November 1944 – May 1945
96? (Note: According to Mathews and Foreman his claim is unconfirmed. Prien, Rodeike and Stemmer list this claim as his 96th aerial victory.)	28 November 1944	14:13	P-47	PQ NN 3–6, vicinity of Aachen					

=== Awards ===
- Spanish Cross in Gold with Swords (14 April 1939)
- German Cross in Gold on 17 October 1943 as Hauptmann in the Stabsstaffel/Jagdgeschwader 51 (Note: According to Obermaier on 10 January 1944.)
- Honour Goblet of the Luftwaffe on 13 September 1943 as Hauptmann and Staffelkapitän
- Knight's Cross of the Iron Cross on 5 April 1944 as Hauptmann and Staffelkapitän of the Stab/Jagdgeschwader 51 "Mölders" (Note: According to Scherzer as Staffelkapitän of the Stabsstaffel/Jagdgeschwader 51 "Mölders".)
