= Fritz Losigkeit =

German fighter ace and Knight's Cross recipient

- Fritz Losigkeit
- Born: 17 November 1913; Berlin-Tegel, German Empire
- Died: 14 January 1994 (aged 80); Hünxe, Germany
- Military career
- Allegiance: Nazi Germany
- Branch: Luftwaffe
- Rank: Major (major)
- Unit: Condor Legion
- Commands: I./JG 1, JG 51, JG 77
- Conflicts: See battles Spanish Civil War World War II: Battle of France; Battle of Britain; Battle of Kursk
- Awards: Spanish Cross in Silver with Swords; Knight's Cross of the Iron Cross
- Other work: Politician

Fritz Losigkeit (17 November 1913 – 14 January 1994) was a German Luftwaffe military aviator during the Spanish Civil War and wing commander during World War II. As a fighter ace, he is credited with 68 aerial victories in approximately 750 combat missions. This figure includes 13 aerial victories over the Western Allies, the remaining victories were claimed over the Eastern Front.

In June 1943, he was given command of III. Gruppe, Jagdgeschwader 51 (JG 51—51st Fighter Wing) which was fighting on the Eastern Front. In April 1944, Losigkeit was appointed Geschwaderkommodore (wing commander) of JG 51. A year later, he was appointed the last Geschwaderkommodore of Jagdgeschwader 77 (JG 77—77th Fighter Wing) and received the Knight's Cross of the Iron Cross, the highest award in the military and paramilitary forces of Nazi Germany during World War II.

== Early life and career ==
Losigkeit was born on 17 November 1913 in Berlin-Tegel and joined the Prussian State Police (preußischen Landespolizei) in 1934. A year later, he transferred to the Reichswehr as a Fahnenjunker (officer candidate) and was eventually selected for flight training. (Note: Flight training in the Luftwaffe progressed through the levels A1, A2 and B1, B2, referred to as A/B flight training. A training included theoretical and practical training in aerobatics, navigation, long-distance flights and dead-stick landings. The B courses included high-altitude flights, instrument flights, night landings and training to handle the aircraft in difficult situations.) After graduation, he was assigned to Jagdgeschwader 132 "Richthofen" (JG 132—132nd Fighter Wing) on 1 October 1936. In late January 1938, Losigkeit was invited to an international winter sports event in Garmisch-Partenkirchen. The event was hosted by the Reichssportführer Hans von Tschammer und Osten and bobsledder Werner Zahn who was also a pilot. Other Luftwaffe officers attending this event included Günther Lützow, Walter Oesau, Karl-Heinz Greisert, Günter Schultze-Blank and Urban Schlaffer.

During the Spanish Civil War, Losigkeit volunteered for service in the Condor Legion. On 25 March 1938, he was assigned to 3. Staffel (3rd squadron) of Jagdgruppe 88, at the time headed by Oberleutnant Horst Lehrmann and based at Zaragoza Airfield. On 31 May 1938, during the second mission of the day, Oberleutnant Werner Mölders led a Schwarm on a ground attack mission. Attacking a truck, Losigkeit was shot down by 20 mm anti-aircraft guns and taken prisoner of war. He spent eight months in captivity in Valencia and Barcelona before returning to Germany in February 1939. For his actions in Spain, he was awarded the Spanish Cross in Silver with Swords (Spanienkreuz in Silber mit Schwertern) on 14 April 1939. Lossigkeit was assigned to 2. Staffel, a squadron of I. Gruppe (1st Group), of Jagdgeschwader 26 (JG 26—26th Fighter Wing) on 1 April. At the time, 2. Staffel was commanded by Hauptmann Walter Kienitz while I. Gruppe was headed by Major Gotthard Handrick.

== World War II ==
World War II in Europe began on Friday 1 September 1939 when German forces invaded Poland. On 23 September 1939, Losigkeit was appointed Staffelkapitän (squadron leader) of 2. Staffel of JG 26, replacing Kienitz who was transferred. He claimed his first victory on 28 May 1940 during the Battle of Dunkirk, as part of the Battle of France, over a Royal Air Force (RAF) Supermarine Spitfire between Dover and Ostend. On 1 June, the fighting over the beachhead at Dunkirk continued. In combat with RAF fighters from No. 19 Squadron, No. 222 Squadron and No. 616 Squadron, Losigkeit shot down a Spitfire near Dunkirk, his last during the Battle of France. The Armistice of 22 June 1940 ended the Battle of France and JG 26 began its relocation back to Germany for a period of rest and replenishment. Two days later, Handrick was appointed Geschwaderkommodore (wing commander) of JG 26 while command of I. Gruppe was handed to Hauptmann Kurt Fischer. On 26 June, the Gruppe arrived at Bönninghardt.

As the air war turned to England, I. Gruppe was moved to France again on 15 July and subordinated to Luftflotte 2 (Air Fleet 2). Losigkeit claimed his first aerial victory during the Battle of Britain on 28 August. On a bomber escort mission, he shot down a Hawker Hurricane from No. 79 Squadron north of Folkestone. Two days later, on a mission attacking 11 Group airfields, he claimed a Spitfire shot down southeast of Littlestone. On 15 September, on a mission to London, Losigkeit claimed his fifth aerial victory of the war and last during the Battle of Britain. Southeast of London, he claimed a No. 92 Squadron Spitfire destroyed.

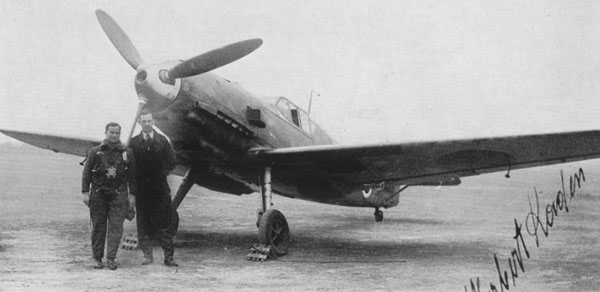
An Imperial Japanese Army Air Service Bf 109 E-7 used in the trials.

On 17 June 1941, Losigkeit was replaced by Oberleutnant Martin Rysavy as Staffelkapitän of 2. Staffel of JG 26. Losigkeit had been transferred to take a position with the staff of the military attaché in Japan. Until January 1942 he advised on German air combat tactics with Imperial Japanese Army Air Service pilots flying the Nakajima Ki-44 against several examples of the Messerschmitt Bf 109 fighter shipped to Japan for evaluation. Wanting to rejoin the European war, he made the 23,300 nautical miles (26,800 miles) voyage back to Germany via the German blockade runner MSS Elsa Essberger. In January 1942, Elsa Essberger and the escorting German submarine U-373 came under attack by British aircraft flying from Gibraltar, forcing Elsa Essberger to make for repairs at Ferrol in Spain.

=== Jagdgruppe Losigkeit ===
Following his return from Japan, Losigkeit joined the staff with the General der Jagdflieger (Inspector of Fighters), an office held by Oberst Adolf Galland. Fearing a British invasion of Norway, Adolf Hitler had ordered the Oberkommando der Marine (OKM—German Navy high command) to return the German battleships Scharnhorst and Gneisenau and the heavy cruiser Prinz Eugen from Brest in Brittany to German bases. The Kriegsmarine transferred the ships on 11–13 February 1942 in Operation Cerberus, also known as the Channel Dash. Further Kriegsmarine vessels were ordered to Norway to combat the convoys heading to the Soviet Union. To protect these naval units from aerial attacks, Galland instructed Losigkeit with the creation of a fighter unit on 14 February. This unit, dubbed Jagdgruppe Losigkeit (Fighter Group Losigkeit), was made up of three Staffeln. 1. Staffel was created from 8. Staffel of Jagdgeschwader 1 (JG 1–1st Fighter Wing) and commanded by Hauptmann Rolf Strössner. 2. Staffel was based on 2. Staffel of JG 1 and led by Hauptmann Werner Dolenga. The Einsatzstaffel of Jagdfliegerschule 1 under Oberleutnant Friedrich Eberle formed 3. Staffel of Jagdgruppe Losigkeit. Losigkeit chose Leutnant Heinz Knoke from 2. Staffel of JG 1 as his adjutant.

On 15 February, the unit began relocating north, at first to Esbjerg in Denmark. The following day, 3. Staffel reached Aalborg. Weather conditions initially affected the transfer. Jagdgruppe Losigkeit reached the Gardemoen Airfield, approximately 40 kilometers (25 miles) north of Oslo, on 20 February and further to Trondheim on 24 February, one day after the Kriegsmarine vessels. At Trondheim, the unit was subordinated to the Jagdfliegerführer Norwegen, an office held by Oberst Carl-Alfred Schumacher. On 25 February, Jagdgruppe Losigkeit provided fighter protection for Prinz Eugen, which had been damaged in the Channel Dash. In March, the unit was ordered back to Germany, arriving in Jever on 20 March where it was disbanded. During its existence, Jagdgruppe Losigkeit claimed one aerial victory, a Spitfire flown by Flight Lieutenant Sandy Gunn shot down by Leutnant Dieter Gerhard on 5 March.

=== With Jagdgeschwader 1 ===
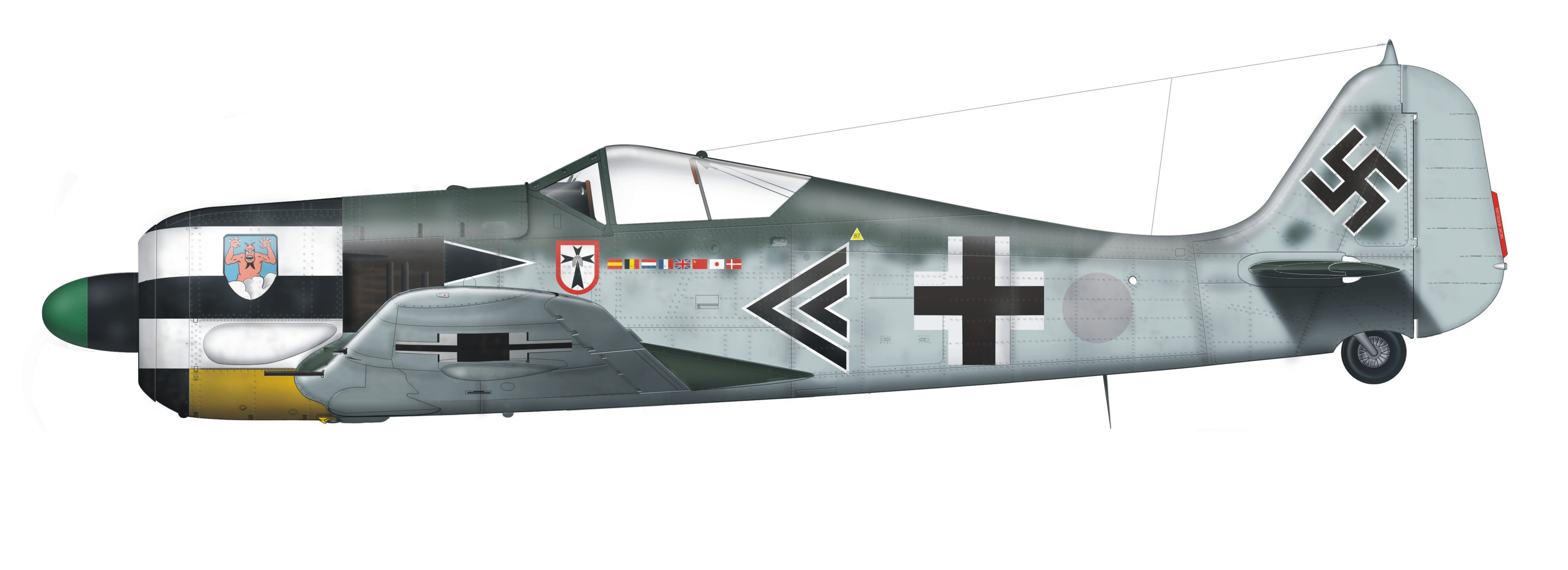
Focke-Wulf Fw 190 A-4, I./JG 1, flown by Losigkeit

In March 1942, IV. Gruppe of JG 1 was re-named III. Gruppe of Jagdgeschwader 5 (JG 5—5th Fighter Wing). In consequence, Losigkeit was charged with the creation of a new IV. Gruppe which was initially based at Werneuchen near Berlin. Oberleutnant Friedrich Eberle headed 10. Staffel which had already served as 3. Staffel of Jagdgruppe Losigkeit. The Einsatzstaffel of Jagdfliegerschule 4 under Oberleutnant Wilhelm Moritz formed 11. Staffel. Oberleutnant Franz Eisenach initially led 12. Staffel created from some pilots of the former IV. Gruppe. Command of 12. Staffel then passed on to Oberleutnant Heinz Stöcker. In late April, Losigkeit reported the combat readiness of IV. Gruppe which then moved to airfields at Leeuwarden and Düsseldorf on 27 April. IV. Gruppe was withdrawn from combat operations in July 1942 and re-equipped with the Focke-Wulf Fw 190 fighter aircraft.

On 1 April 1943, I. Gruppe of JG 1 became the II. Gruppe of Jagdgeschwader 11 (JG 11—11th Fighter Wing). In consequence, IV. Gruppe of JG 1 became the new I. Gruppe of JG 1. On 17 April, the United States Army Air Forces (USAAF) VIII Bomber Command attacked the Focke-Wulf factories at Bremen, causing significant damage. During the attack, Losigkeit shot down a Boeing B-17 Flying Fortress bomber. On 2 May, 25 RAF Spitfires escorted 18 Lockheed Ventura bombers which were intercepted by fighters from I. and II. Gruppe of JG 1 east of Vlissingen. For the loss of two Fw 190s, pilots of JG 1 claimed nine aerial victories, including a Ventura claimed by Losigkeit.

=== Eastern Front ===
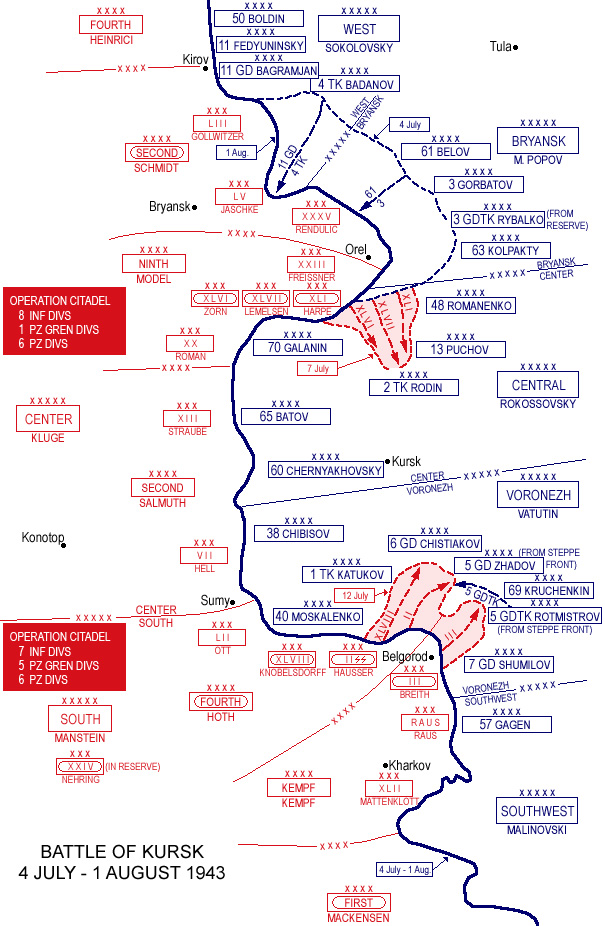
German penetration during the Battle of Kursk

On 20 May, Losigkeit was transferred upon his own request. He was given command of I. Gruppe of JG 26 on the Eastern Front. The former commander of I. Gruppe of JG 26, Major Johannes Seifert, had been taken off combat duty after his brother was killed in action. Losigkeit had made his request for transfer because of substantial differences with the Jafü (Jagdfliegerführer—the commander of the fighter forces) of the 3. Jagd-Division. Apparently the commanding officer of the 3. Jagd-Division, Generalleutnant Werner Junck, had accused the fighter pilots of cowardice in combating the B-17 bombers. On 4 June, he flew his first mission on the Eastern Front, flying a fighter sweep 60 kilometers (37 miles) into Soviet airspace from Shatalovka. On 6 June, I. Gruppe began its return to Germany while Losigkeit remained on the Eastern Front. On 26 June, he took over command of III. Gruppe of Jagdgeschwader 51 "Mölders" (JG 51—51st Fighter Wing) from Hauptmann Herbert Wehnelt who had briefly led the Gruppe after Hauptmann Karl-Heinz Schnell was transferred.

III. Gruppe was also based Shatalovka, flying combat missions in the vicinity of Mtsensk and Oryol. On 5 July, III. Gruppe began flying missions in support of Operation Citadel, as part of the Battle of Kursk. The Gruppe supported the 9th Army, attacking the salient from the north. That day, Losigkeit claimed two Lavochkin La-5 fighters shot down. The following day, in aerial combat near Maloarkhangelsk, he claimed another La-5 destroyed. Later that day, he was credited with shooting down a Lavochkin-Gorbunov-Gudkov LaGG-3 fighter. On 7 July, III. Gruppe again fought in the vicinity of Maloarkhangelsk where they claimed 17 aerial victories, including a Mikoyan-Gurevich MiG-3 by Losigkeit, for the loss of one severely shot up Fw 190 from 8. Staffel. Losigkeit was awarded the German Cross in Gold (Deutsches Kreuz in Gold) on 17 October 1943.

=== Wing commander ===
On 1 April 1944, Losigkeit was appointed Geschwaderkommodore of JG 51. He succeeded Oberstleutnant Karl-Gottfried Nordmann who was transferred. Command of III. Gruppe of JG 51 was handed to Hauptmann Diethelm von Eichel-Streiber. The Stab of JG 51 was based at Terespol in the combat area of Army Group Centre. On 21 June, bombers of the Eighth Air Force, formerly VIII Bomber Command, on a shuttle bombing mission of Operation Frantic, attacked oil refineries south of Berlin before heading for the Poltava Air Base. The bombers were intercepted by elements of JG 51 led by Losigkeit. In this encounter, two of the escorting North American P-51 Mustang fighters were shot down. One of the P-51 fighters crashed near the Luftwaffe airfield at Babruysk where III. Gruppe of JG 51 was based. In its cockpit, a map of the Poltava Air Base was found. The commander of III. Gruppe, Eichel-Streiber, sent the map to the headquarters of Luftflotte 6 (6th Air Fleet). This intelligence led to an attack by Luftwaffe bombers which destroyed 44 parked B-17 bombers and damaged further 26.

Losigkeit flew to Danzig-Langfuhr, present-day Wrzeszcz, in a Messerschmitt Bf 108 Taifun in late March 1945 to assist the retreat west. There, he was handed a teleprinter message by Oberst Herbert Ihlefeld that he was ordered to Ostrau, present-day Ostrava, to take command of Jagdgeschwader 77 (JG 77—77th Fighter Wing) on 1 April 1945. He succeeded Major Siegfried Freytag in this capacity who had temporarily assumed this office after Oberstleutnant Erich Leie was killed in action on 7 March. That day, he took command of JG 77 at Beneschau, present-day Benešov, in the Czech Republic. With the arrival of Losigkeit, Freytag resumed command of II. Gruppe of JG 77. Command of JG 51 was passed on to Major Heinz Lange. Losigkeit was awarded the Knight's Cross of the Iron Cross (Ritterkreuz des Eisernen Kreuzes) on 28 April 1945.

The Geschwaderstab and II. Gruppe were based at Skutsch (Skuteč) on 8 May. Losigkeit ordered the destruction of all remaining aircraft before boarding a Junkers Ju 52 transport aircraft, filled up with fuel from salvaged aircraft, heading west to avoid capture by the Red Army.

== Later life ==
After the war, Losigkeit was a member of the Gehlen Organization codename "Lohmann". In 1953, Günter Hofé, an old friend of Losigkeit and member of the Service de Documentation Extérieure et de Contre-Espionnage) (French Secret Service), contacted Losigkeit which led to Hofé being recruited by the Gehlen Organization. Hofé was involved in a counterespionage activity involving Heinz Felfe. Losigkeit died on 14 January 1994 in Hünxe.

== Summary of career ==
=== Aerial victory claims ===
According to US historian David T. Zabecki, Losigkeit was credited with 68 aerial victories. Obermaier and Spick also list him with 68 aerial victories, including 13 on the Western Front, claimed in approximately 750 combat missions, and a mission-to-claim ratio of 11.03. Mathews and Foreman, authors of Luftwaffe Aces — Biographies and Victory Claims, researched the German Federal Archives and found records for 51 aerial victory claims. This figure includes 44 aerial victories on the Eastern Front and seven over the Western Allies, including one four-engined bomber.

Victory claims were logged to a map-reference (PQ = Planquadrat), for example "PQ 05 Ost S/83/1/5". The Luftwaffe grid map (Jägermeldenetz) covered all of Europe, western Russia and North Africa and was composed of rectangles measuring 15 minutes of latitude by 30 minutes of longitude, an area of about 930 square kilometers (360 square miles). These sectors were then subdivided into 36 smaller units to give a location area 3 by 4 kilometers (1.9 by 2.5 miles) in size.

Chronicle of aerial victories
Claim	Date	Time	Type	Location	Claim	Date	Time	Type	Location
– 2. Staffel of Jagdgeschwader 26 – Battle of France — 10 May – 25 June 1940
1	28 May 1940	10:35	Spitfire	Calais; Dover-Ostend	2	1 June 1940	06:40	Spitfire	Dunkirk
– 2. Staffel of Jagdgeschwader 26 – Action at the Channel and over England — 26–17 June 1941
3	28 August 1940	10:05	Hurricane	north of Folkestone	5	15 September 1940	15:40	Spitfire	southeast of London
4	30 August 1940	19:30	Spitfire	southeast of Littlestone-on-Sea					
– I. Gruppe of Jagdgeschwader 1 – Western Front — 1 April – 20 May 1943
6	17 April 1943	13:18	B-17	PQ 05 Ost S/83/1/5	7	2 May 1943	19:40	Ventura	120 kilometres (75 mi) west of Haarlem
– III. Gruppe of Jagdgeschwader 51 – Eastern Front — 26 June – 31 December 1943
8	5 July 1943	07:20	La-5	PQ 35 Ost 63693; 20 kilometres (12 mi) south-southwest of Trosna	24	9 August 1943	16:24	Il-2 m.H. (Note: The "m.H." refers to an Ilyushin Il-2 with rear gunner (mit Heckschütze).)	PQ 35 Ost 35458; 30 kilometres (19 mi) northwest of Spas-Demensk
9	5 July 1943	13:32	La-5	PQ 35 Ost 63544; 10 kilometres (6.2 mi) south-southeast of Trosna	25	12 August 1943	10:30	LaGG-3	PQ 35 Ost 45393; 25 kilometres (16 mi) east-northeast of Yelnya
10	6 July 1943	08:43	La-5	PQ 35 Ost 63582; 20 kilometres (12 mi) southwest of Maloarkhangelsk	26	12 August 1943	10:55	La-5	PQ 35 Ost 35443; 25 kilometres (16 mi) north-northwest of Spas-Demensk
11	6 July 1943	17:05	LaGG-3	PQ 35 Ost 63723; 20 kilometres (12 mi) west of Zolotukhino	27	12 August 1943	16:25	LaGG-3	PQ 35 Ost 35466; 25 kilometres (16 mi) northeast of Spas-Demensk
12	7 July 1943	14:56	MiG-3	PQ 35 Ost 63578; 20 kilometres (12 mi) south-southeast of Trosna	28	14 August 1943	18:55	MiG-3	PQ 35 Ost 26641; 10 kilometres (6.2 mi) north of Bohodukhiv
13	9 July 1943	10:45	P-39	PQ 35 Ost 63724; 20 kilometres (12 mi) west of Zolotukhino	29	16 August 1943	16:15	La-5	PQ 35 Ost 26534; 40 kilometres (25 mi) north-northeast of Moschna
14	11 July 1943	13:56	MiG-3	PQ 35 Ost 63721; 20 kilometres (12 mi) west of Zolotukhino	30	18 August 1943	18:15	LaGG-3	PQ 35 Ost 26824; 20 kilometres (12 mi) north of Yartsevo
15	12 July 1943	19:50	LaGG-3	PQ 35 Ost 54273; 25 kilometres (16 mi) southwest of Kozelsk	31	21 August 1943	09:40	MiG-3	PQ 35 Ost 35661; 25 km (16 mi) southwest of Kaluga
16	13 July 1943	13:55	Il-2 m.H.	PQ 35 Ost 63253; 10 kilometres (6.2 mi) west of Oryol	32	22 August 1943	10:13	La-5	PQ 35 Ost 35479, 30 km (19 mi) east of Yelnya; 25 kilometres (16 mi) northeast of Moschna
17	13 July 1943	14:25	Il-2 m.H.	PQ 35 Ost 53231; 15 kilometres (9.3 mi) southeast of Zalegoshch	33	22 August 1943	18:20	La-5	PQ 35 Ost 26672; 25 kilometres (16 mi) east of Yelnya
18	17 July 1943	07:17	La-5	PQ 35 Ost 63398; 15 kilometres (9.3 mi) north-northwest of Maloarkhangelsk	34	27 August 1943	10:00	LaGG-3	PQ 35 Ost 43848; 10 kilometres (6.2 mi) southeast of Sevsk
19	29 July 1943	15:36	LaGG-3	PQ 35 Ost 54654; 20 kilometres (12 mi) east-northeast of Belyov	35	3 September 1943	11:13	Boston	PQ 35 Ost 32458; 10 kilometres (6.2 mi) southwest of Hlukhiv
20	1 August 1943	10:35	LaGG-3	PQ 35 Ost 54638; 15 kilometres (9.3 mi) south-southeast of Kromy	36	3 September 1943	16:31	Boston	PQ 35 Ost 32675; 25 kilometres (16 mi) east-northeast of Konotop
21	1 August 1943	18:25	LaGG-3	PQ 35 Ost 53498; 10 kilometres (6.2 mi) west of Bolkhov	37	15 September 1943	17:05	Yak-9	PQ 35 Ost 25376; 10 kilometres (6.2 mi) west of Yelnya
22	2 August 1943	09:15	P-39	PQ 35 Ost 53498; 15 kilometres (9.3 mi) south-southeast of Kromy	38	22 November 1943	14:20	P-51	Gomel; 10 kilometres (6.2 mi) west of Yelnya
23	9 August 1943	16:11	Yak-9	PQ 35 Ost 45511; 10 kilometres (6.2 mi) north of Spas-Demensk	39	28 December 1943	12:15	Yak-7	PQ 25 Ost 93419; 15 kilometres (9.3 mi) southeast of Parichi
– III. Gruppe of Jagdgeschwader 51 – Eastern Front — 1 January – 31 March 1944
40	8 January 1944	12:06	La-5	PQ 35 Ost 06583; 10 kilometres (6.2 mi) north of Vitebsk	43	5 February 1944	10:16	La-5	PQ 25 Ost 93337; 10 kilometres (6.2 mi) south of Parichi
41	16 January 1944	11:26	Yak-7	PQ 25 Ost 93474; 25 kilometres (16 mi) south of Parichi	44	5 February 1944	10:20	Yak-7	PQ 25 Ost 93353; 20 kilometres (12 mi) southwest of Parichi
42	16 January 1944	14:26	Yak-9	PQ 25 Ost 93398; 30 kilometres (19 mi) south-southeast of Parichi	45	28 March 1944	16:15	Yak-9	PQ 35 Ost 05658; 30 kilometres (19 mi) southeast of Stara Bychow
– Stab of Jagdgeschwader 51 – Eastern Front — 1 April – 31 December 1944
46	30 June 1944	15:28	Yak-7	PQ 25 Ost N/85672; 15 kilometres (9.3 mi) west of Barysaw	49	10 July 1944	16:27	Yak-9	PQ 25 Ost N/53182; 50 kilometres (31 mi) south of Slonim
47	30 June 1944	18:07	La-5	PQ 25 Ost N/85583; 5 kilometres (3.1 mi) east of Barysaw	50	16 July 1944	16:01	Pe-2	PQ 25 Ost N/40293 vicinity of Zolochiv
48	1 July 1944	11:35	Yak-9	PQ 25 Ost N/85734 vicinity of Barysaw	51	24 July 1944	15:44	Pe-2	PQ 25 Ost N/41763; 30 kilometres (19 mi) east-northeast of Zhovkva

=== Awards ===
- Spanish Cross in Silver with Swords (14 April 1939)
- Iron Cross (1939) 2nd and 1st Class
- Honour Goblet of the Luftwaffe on 11 October 1943 as Major and Gruppenkommandeur
- German Cross in Gold on 17 October 1943 as Major in III./Jagdgeschwader 51
- Knight's Cross of the Iron Cross on 28 April 1945 as Major and Geschwaderkommodore of Jagdgeschwader 51 "Mölders"

== Notes ==
Military offices
Preceded by Oberstleutnant Karl-Gottfried Nordmann	Commander of Jagdgeschwader 51 Mölders; 1 April 1944 – 31 March 1945	Succeeded by Major Heinz Lange
Preceded by Major Siegfried Freytag	Commander of Jagdgeschwader 77 Herz AS; 1 April 1945 – May 1945	Succeeded by none
