= Maloarkhangelsk =

Maloarkhangelsk (Russian: Малоархангельск) is the name of several inhabited localities in Russia.

Urban localities

- Maloarkhangelsk, Oryol Oblast, a town in Maloarkhangelsky District of Oryol Oblast

Rural localities

- Maloarkhangelsk, Zabaykalsky Krai, a selo in Krasnochikoysky District of Zabaykalsky Krai

== See also ==
- stantsii Maloarkhangelsk, a rural locality (a settlement) in Maloarkhangelsky District of Oryol Oblast
- Arkhangelsk, a city in Arkhangelsk Oblast
