= Maklok =

Name of several rural localities in Russia

Maklok (Russian: Маклок) is the name of several rural localities in Russia:

- Maklok, Smolensk Oblast, a village in Sitkovskoye Rural Settlement of Velizhsky District of Smolensk Oblast
- Maklok, Voronezh Oblast, a settlement in Shuberskoye Rural Settlement of Novousmansky District of Voronezh Oblast
