= Maloarkhangelsky =

Maloarkhangelsky (masculine), Maloarkhangelskaya (feminine), or Maloarkhangelskoye (neuter) may refer to:

- Maloarkhangelsky District, a district of Oryol Oblast, Russia
- Maloarkhangelskoye, a rural locality (a selo) in Samara Oblast, Russia
