= Edwin Thiel =

German fighter ace and Knight's Cross recipient (1913–1944)

- Born: 19 June 1913; Oberbexbach, German Empire
- Died: 14 July 1944 (aged 31); Vawkavysk, Reichskommissariat Ostland
- Military career
- Allegiance: Nazi Germany
- Branch: Luftwaffe
- Service years: 1941–1944
- Rank: Hauptmann (captain)
- Units: JG 51, EJGr Ost
- Commands: 2./JG 51
- Conflicts: World War II: Operation Barbarossa; Battle of Kursk
- Awards: Knight's Cross of the Iron Cross
- Other work: Deutsche Luft Hansa pilot

Edwin Ludwig Thiel (19 June 1913 – 14 July 1944) was a Luftwaffe ace and recipient of the Knight's Cross of the Iron Cross during World War II. The Knight's Cross of the Iron Cross, and its variants were the highest awards in the military and paramilitary forces of Nazi Germany during World War II. Edwin Thiel was killed on 14 July 1944 after bailing out of his plane after it was hit by Soviet flak. During his career he was credited with 76 victories in 300 missions.

== Career ==
Thiel was born on 19 June 1913 in Oberbexbach in the Saarland, which at the time was politically part of the Kingdom of Bavaria of the German Empire. Prior to World War II, he qualified as a civil pilot and flew with Deutsche Luft Hansa and served a flight instructor. In late 1941, Thiel was posted to I. Gruppe (1st group) of Jagdgeschwader 51 "Mölders" (JG 51—51st Fighter Wing).

On 29 May 1942, Thiel was appointed Staffelkapitän (squadron leader) of 2. Staffel of JG 51. He succeeded Leutnant Erwin Fleig who had been shot down behind enemy lines and became a prisoner of war. On 16 April 1943, Thiel was awarded the Knight's Cross of the Iron Cross (Ritterkreuz des Eisernen Kreuzes) for 51 aerial victories claimed.

In July 1943, Thiel was transferred to Ergänzungs-Jagdgruppe Ost, specialized training unit for new fighter pilots destined for the Eastern Front, as an instructor. There, he commanded the 1. Staffel. Thiel was replaced by Oberleutnant Horst Haase as commander of 2. Staffel of JG 51.

In May 1944, Thiel transferred back to JG 51. There, he was given command of the Stabsstaffel which had temporarily been led by Leutnant Herbert Friebel after Oberleutnant Diethelm von Eichel-Streiber was transferred in April 1944. (Note: In early October 1942, II. Gruppe of JG 51 had been withdrawn from the Eastern Front and sent to Jesau, near present-day Bagrationovsk, to Heiligenbeil, present-day Mamonovo, to be reequipped with the Focke-Wulf Fw 190 A. While undergoing training on this aircraft, the Gruppe received orders on 4 November to transfer to the Mediterranean theatre flying the Messerschmitt Bf 109 again. 6. Staffel had been exempt from this order, was detached from II. Gruppe, and continued its training on the Fw 190. In late November, 6. Staffel was renamed to Stabsstaffel (headquarters squadron) of JG 51. Alternatively, the Stabsstaffel was also referred to as Geschwaderstabsstaffel z.b.V., roughly translating to fighter wing squadron for special deployment'. The abbreviation z. b. V. is German and stands for zur besonderen Verwendung (for special deployment).) Thiel was killed in action on 14 July 1944 when his Focke-Wulf Fw 190 A-8 (Werknummer 170943—factory number) was shot down by Soviet anti-aircraft artillery 2 kilometers (1.2 miles) east of Vawkavysk. Command of the Stabsstaffel was then given to Oberleutnant Heinz Busse.

== Summary of career ==
=== Aerial victory claims ===
According to US historian David T. Zabecki, Thiel was credited with 76 aerial victories. Spick also lists him with 76 aerial victories claimed in an unknown number of combat missions, all of which claimed on the Eastern Front. Mathews and Foreman, authors of Luftwaffe Aces — Biographies and Victory Claims, researched the German Federal Archives and found records for 71 aerial victory claims, all of which claimed on the Eastern Front in over 300 combat missions.

Victory claims were logged to a map-reference (PQ = Planquadrat), for example "PQ 37651". The Luftwaffe grid map (Jägermeldenetz) covered all of Europe, western Russia and North Africa and was composed of rectangles measuring 15 minutes of latitude by 30 minutes of longitude, an area of about 360 square miles (930 km^{2}). These sectors were then subdivided into 36 smaller units to give a location area 3 km × 4 km (1.9 mi × 2.5 mi) in size.

Chronicle of aerial victories
This and the ♠ (Ace of spades) indicates those aerial victories which made Thiel an "ace-in-a-day", a term which designates a fighter pilot who has shot down five or more airplanes in a single day. This and the ? (question mark) indicates information discrepancies listed by Prien, Stemmer, Rodeike, Bock, Mathews and Foreman.
Claim	Date	Time	Type	Location	Claim	Date	Time	Type	Location
– 1. Staffel of Jagdgeschwader 51 – Operation Barbarossa — October – 5 December 1941
1	2 October 1941	14:16? (Note: According to Mathews and Foreman claimed at 14:15.)	I-61 (MiG-3)	45 km (28 mi) northwest of Roslavl	2	3 October 1941	09:55	I-18 (MiG-1)	
– 2. Staffel of Jagdgeschwader 51 – Eastern Front — 1 May 1942 – 3 February 1943
According to Prien, Stemmer, Rodeike and Bock, Thiel claimed 23 undocumented aerial victories between 30 May and 15 September 1942. These claims are not documented by Mathews and Foreman.
28	27 June 1942	09:42	MiG-3		36	29 October 1942	13:42	P-40	Volokolamsk
29	6 July 1942	14:20	Pe-2		37	29 October 1942	13:44	P-40	Volokolamsk
30	6 July 1942	14:22	Pe-2		38♠	4 December 1942	11:47	P-40	vicinity of Schojtzowa
31	6 July 1942	14:24	Pe-2	1 km (0.62 mi) west of Bobrowo	39♠	4 December 1942	11:53	Il-2	5 km (3.1 mi) north of Ljatiwina
32	7 July 1942	19:05	MiG-3		40♠	4 December 1942	11:56	Il-2	PQ 37651
33	8 July 1942	07:50	MiG-3		41♠	4 December 1942	11:58	Il-2	2 km (1.2 mi) north of Pegorjelka
34	8 July 1942	07:52	MiG-3		42♠	4 December 1942	12:05	Il-2	3 km (1.9 mi) southwest of Katowa
35	11 July 1942	06:05	MiG-3						
– 2. Staffel of Jagdgeschwader 51 – Eastern Front — 4 February – July 1943
43	23 February 1943	10:39	Pe-2	PQ 35 Ost 44294; 20 km (12 mi) northeast of Zhizdra	54	10 June 1943	19:23	Il-2	PQ 35 Ost 44473; 15 km (9.3 mi) north of Bryansk
44	23 February 1943	10:41	Pe-2	PQ 35 Ost 44264; 15 km (9.3 mi) northeast of Zhizdra	55	6 July 1943	19:47	LaGG-3	PQ 35 Ost 63584; 20 km (12 mi) southwest of Maloarkhangelsk
45	23 February 1943	10:45	Pe-2	PQ 35 Ost 44264; 20 km (12 mi) southwest of Dudovskiy	56	11 July 1943	16:32	Yak-1	PQ 35 Ost 64882; 20 km (12 mi) southeast of Mtsensk
46	23 February 1943	10:46	Pe-2	PQ 35 Ost 54142; 25 km (16 mi) northeast of Zhizdra	57	11 July 1943	16:33	Il-2	PQ 35 Ost 64896; 15 km (9.3 mi) north of Maloarkhangelsk
47♠	24 February 1943	10:40	Il-2	PQ 35 Ost 44223; 25 km (16 mi) north of Zhizdra	58	11 July 1943	16:35	Il-2	PQ 35 Ost 64853; 25 km (16 mi) east-northeast of Zalegoshch
48♠	24 February 1943	10:48	Pe-2	PQ 35 Ost 44233; 25 km (16 mi) north-northeast of Zhizdra	59	11 July 1943	17:24	La-5	PQ 35 Ost 63471; 15 km (9.3 mi) northeast of Zalegoshch
49♠	24 February 1943	13:41	La-5	PQ 35 Ost 64612; 25 km (16 mi) south of Arsenjewo	60	12 July 1943	08:45	La-5	PQ 35 Ost 64591; 20 km (12 mi) east of Zalegoshch
50♠	24 February 1943	13:46	Il-2	PQ 35 Ost 64671; 20 km (12 mi) north of Mtsensk	61	12 July 1943	08:54	Yak-1	PQ 35 Ost 63231, west of Novosil; 25 km (16 mi) east-northeast of Zalegoshch
51♠	24 February 1943	13:50	Il-2	PQ 35 Ost 64621; 20 km (12 mi) north-northeast of Mtsensk	62	13 July 1943	13:42	Yak-1	PQ 35 Ost 63225; 10 km (6.2 mi) east of Zalegoshch
52	8 June 1943	08:53	Yak-7	PQ 35 Ost 63394; 15 km (9.3 mi) north-northwest of Maloarkhangelsk	63	13 July 1943	13:43	Il-2	PQ 35 Ost 63254; 10 km (6.2 mi) east of Zalegoshch
53	10 June 1943	19:20	Il-2	PQ 35 Ost 44562; 15 km (9.3 mi) southeast of Dyatkovo	64	13 July 1943	13:45	Il-2	PQ 35 Ost 63221; 15 km (9.3 mi) southeast of Zalegoshch
– Stabsstaffel of Jagdgeschwader 51 – Eastern Front — May – 14 July 1944
65♠	23 June 1944	10:48	Il-2	PQ 25 Ost 96658; 15 km (9.3 mi) southwest of Haradok	69♠	23 June 1944	14:18? (Note: According to Mathews and Foreman claimed at 14:58.)	Il-2	PQ 25 Ost 96813; 20 km (12 mi) east of Ulla
66♠	23 June 1944	10:50	Il-2	PQ 25 Ost 96655; 15 km (9.3 mi) southwest of Haradok	70	25 June 1944	09:35	Pe-2? (Note: According to Mathews and Foreman claimed as an Ilyushin Il-2.)	PQ 35 Ost 05559; 15 km (9.3 mi) south of Orsha
67♠	23 June 1944	10:53	Il-2	PQ 25 Ost 96652; 15 km (9.3 mi) southwest of Haradok	71	25 June 1944	09:38	Pe-2?	PQ 35 Ost 05565; 25 km (16 mi) south-southwest of Orsha
68♠	23 June 1944	14:12? (Note: According to Mathews and Foreman claimed at 14:54.)	Il-2	PQ 25 Ost 96776; 20 km (12 mi) east-northeast of Ulla					

=== Awards ===
- Flugzeugführerabzeichen
- Front Flying Clasp of the Luftwaffe
- Iron Cross (1939) 2nd and 1st Class
- Honour Goblet of the Luftwaffe (Ehrenpokal der Luftwaffe) on 15 June 1942 as Leutnant and pilot
- German Cross in Gold on 9 September 1942 as Leutnant in the I./Jagdgeschwader 51
- Knight's Cross of the Iron Cross on 16 April 1943 as Oberleutnant and Staffelführer of the 2./Jagdgeschwader 51 "Mölders" (Note: According to Scherzer as Staffelkapitän of the 2./Jagdgeschwader 51 "Mölders".)
