= Ludwig Holtmeier =

German music theorist and piano (born 1964)

Ludwig Holtmeier (born 1964) is a German music theorist and pianist.

== Life ==
Holtmeier studied piano at the Hochschule für Musik Detmold and at the Conservatoire de musique de Genève and Conservatoire de musique de Neuchâtel and passed the concert exam in 1992. In addition to piano he also studied music theory, musicology, school music, history and German studies in Freiburg and Berlin. In 2010 he collected his doctorate at Technische Universität Berlin with a thesis on the reception of Jean-Philippe Rameau's music theory writings.

He taught as a music theorist at the Hochschule für Musik Freiburg and as a musicologist at the Hochschule für Musik "Hanns Eisler" in Berlin. From 2000 to 2003 he was professor of music theory at the Hochschule für Musik Carl Maria von Weber in Dresden, and since 2003 he has held a professorship at the Freiburg University of Music, where he also held the office of prorector from 2012 to 2017. Since 1 October 2017 he has been rector of the Freiburg University of Music. From 2007 to 2009 he was also a lecturer for historical composition at the Schola Cantorum Basiliensis, Basel.

Until 2017 Holtmeier was co-editor of the journal Musik & Ästhetik. He was president of the Society for Music and Aesthetics as well as founding member and vice-president of the Gesellschaft für Musiktheorie (2000–2004). As a song accompanist (piano forte) he recorded several CDs. His main learning interests include the history of music theory, analysis and the Second Viennese School.

== Publications ==
- Nicht Kunst? Nicht Wissenschaft? Zur Lage der Musiktheorie. In Musik & Ästhetik 1, 1997, p. 119–136.
- with Eckehard Kiem (ed.): Richard Wagner und seine Zeit. Laaber, Laaber 2003 ISBN 978-3-921518-95-3.
- Arnold Schönbergs "Berliner Schule".
- Heinichen, Rameau, and the Italian thoroughbass tradition: Concepts of tonality and chord in the rule of the octave. In Journal of music theory 51, 2007, pp. 5–49.
- Implizite Theorie: Zum Akkordbegriff der italienischen Generalbass-Theorie. In Basler Jahrbuch für Historische Musikpraxis 31, 2007, pp. 149–170.
- Funktionale Mehrdeutigkeit, Tonalität und arabische Stufen. Überlegungen zu einer Reform der harmonischen Analyse. In Zeitschrift der Gesellschaft für Musiktheorie (ZGMTH). vol. 8, Nr. 3, 2011, ISSN 1862-6742, pp. 465–487 (online).
- with Johannes Menke and Felix Diergarten: Solfeggi, Bassi e Fughe. Georg Friedrich Händels Übungen zur Satzlehre. Florian Noetzel Verlag, Wilhelmshaven 2013, ISBN 978-3-7959-0906-2.
- Rameaus langer Schatten. Studien zur deutschen Musiktheorie des 18. Jahrhunderts. Dissertation TU Berlin 2010. Druckfassung: Georg Olms Verlag, Hildesheim 2017, ISBN 978-3-487-15547-0.
