= Hainich National Park =

National Park in Thuringia, Germany

- Nationalpark Hainich
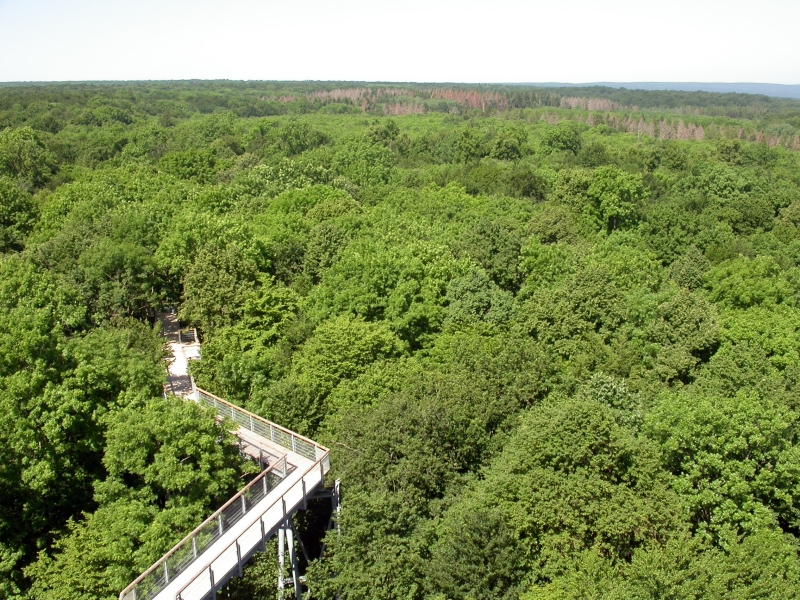
- Canopy walkway through the forest
- Interactive map of Hainich National Park
- Location: Thuringia, Germany
- Nearest city: Bad Langensalza
- Coordinates: 51.096667°N 10.390833°E
- Area: 75 km^{2} (29 sq mi)
- Established: 31 December 1997
- Governing body: Nationalpark Hainich; Bei der Marktkirche 9; 99947 Bad Langensalza

Hainich National Park (German: Nationalpark Hainich), founded on December 31, 1997, is the 13th national park in Germany and the only one in Thuringia. One of the main objectives of the park is the protection of an ancient native beech forest. In 2011, the park was added to the Ancient and Primeval Beech Forests of the Carpathians and Other Regions of Europe World Heritage Site because of its testimony to the ecological history of the beech tree and the dynamics of forests in Europe since the Last Glacial Period.

== Geography ==
The 75 km^{2} (29 sq mi) park lies in the western part of the German state of Thuringia, east of the Werra River, and is part of the greater Eichsfeld-Hainich-Werratal Nature Park. It occupies much of the triangular area between the cities of Eisenach, Mühlhausen, and Bad Langensalza. The national park the southern part of the roughly 160 km^{2} (62 sq mi) Hainich, the largest contiguous deciduous forest in Germany.

== Biodiversity ==
=== Animals ===
Animals in the park include wildcats, 15 species of bats, 7 species of woodpeckers, and over 500 types of wood beetles.

=== Fungi ===
To date, over 1,600 species of fungi have been recorded in the National Park, and the eventual total, including lichen-forming species, is expected to exceed 3,000. Around 300 of the already recorded fungi are endangered or even threatened by extinction. Some are found nowhere else in Thuringia or are extremely rare in Germany as a whole, and their protection is a responsibility recognized by the National Park.

=== Plants ===
About 900 plant species have been recorded in the National Park. European beech dominates the forest communities, with additional populations of ash trees, hornbeams, limes, and maples. Particularly striking are spring snowflake and corydalis, liverleaf, early dog-violet, anemone, buttercup anemone, wild garlic and Turk's cap lily.

== Protection of the ecosystem ==
The goal of Hainich National Park is to restore a large section of central European forest to its primordial state. The park covers an area formerly used for military training, with about 50 km^{2} (19 sq mi) of deciduous forest. In the future, the beech forest should grow to cover most of the park's area.

== Photo gallery ==
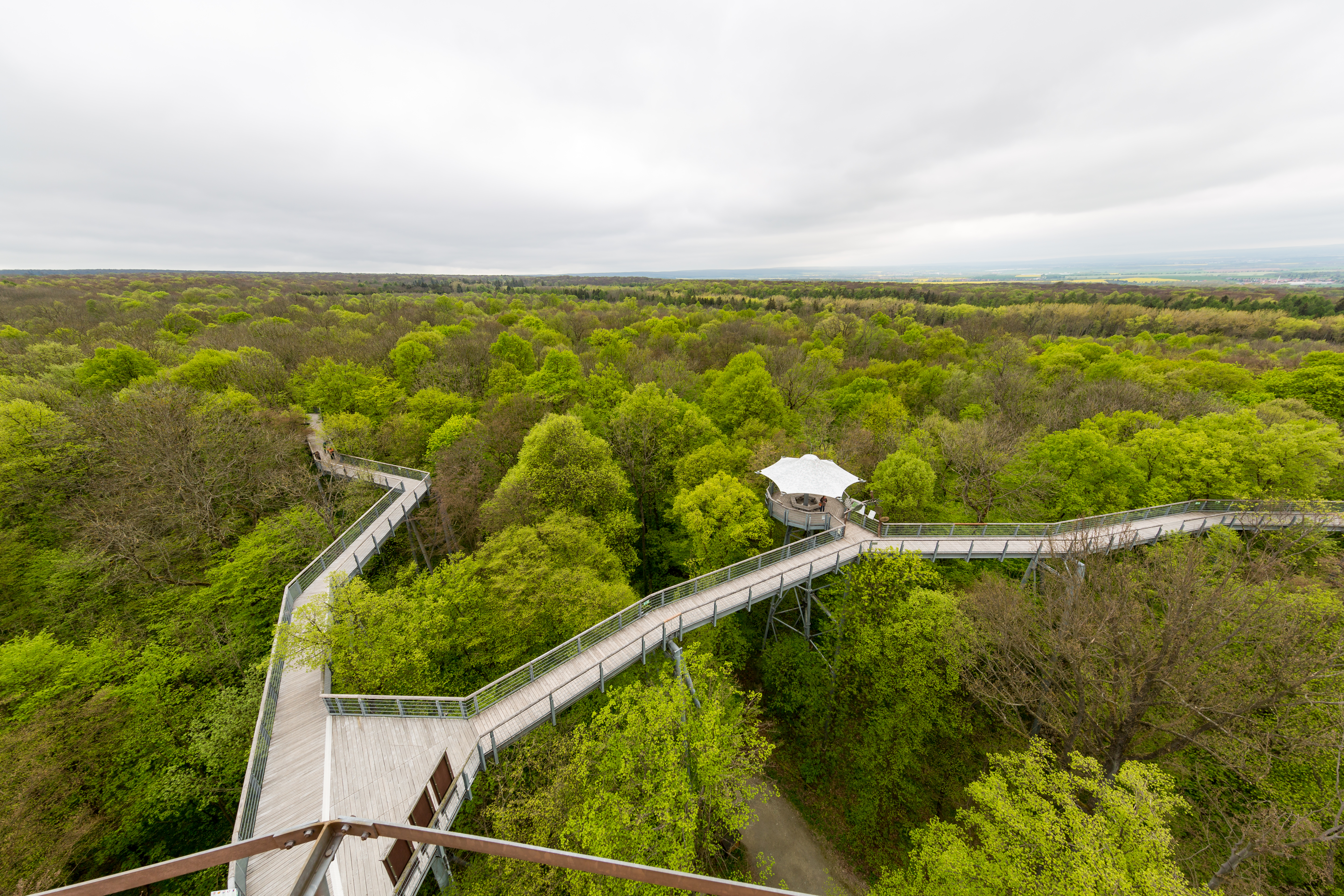
Canopy walkway

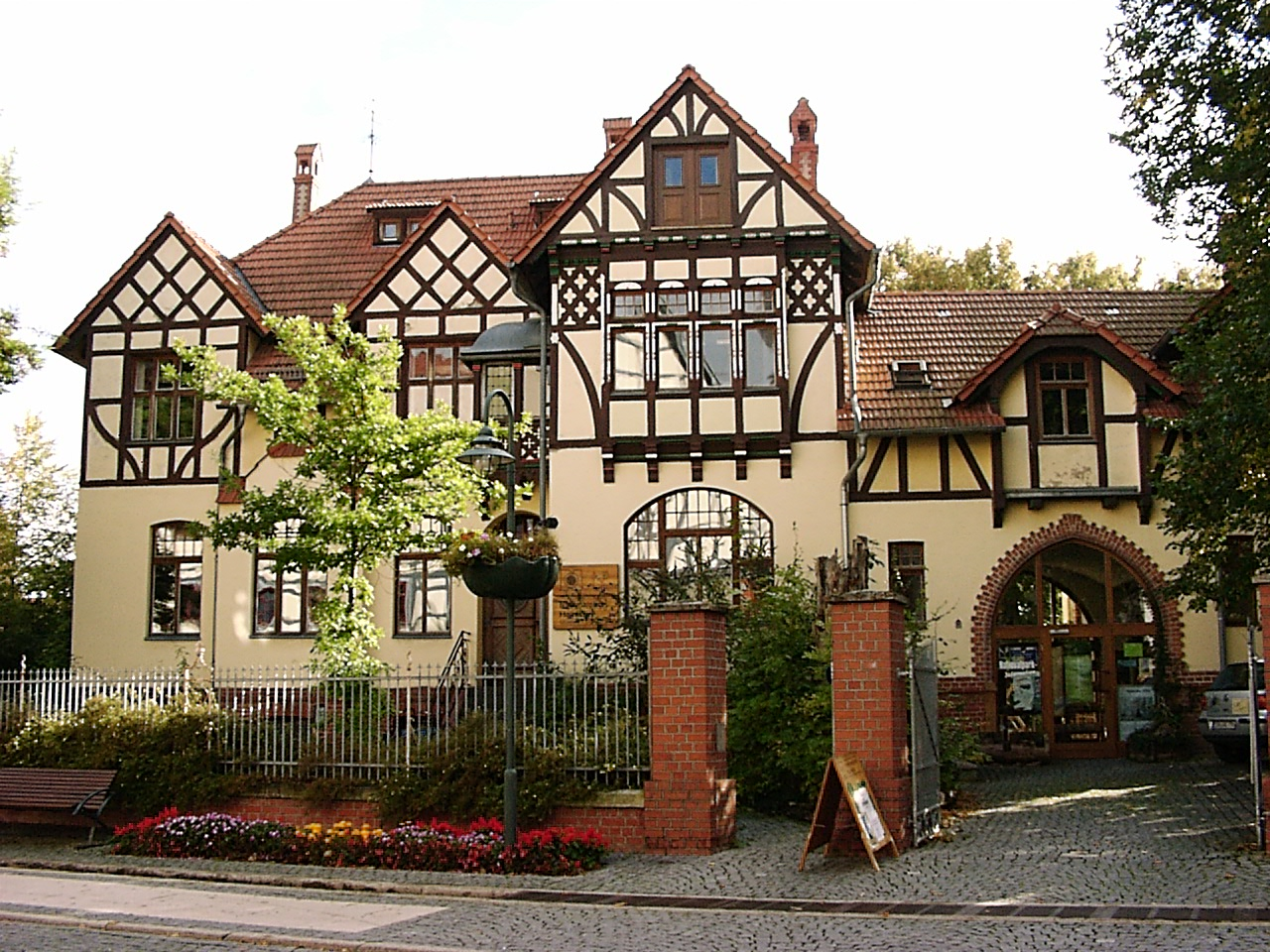
Visitor center in Bad Langensalza

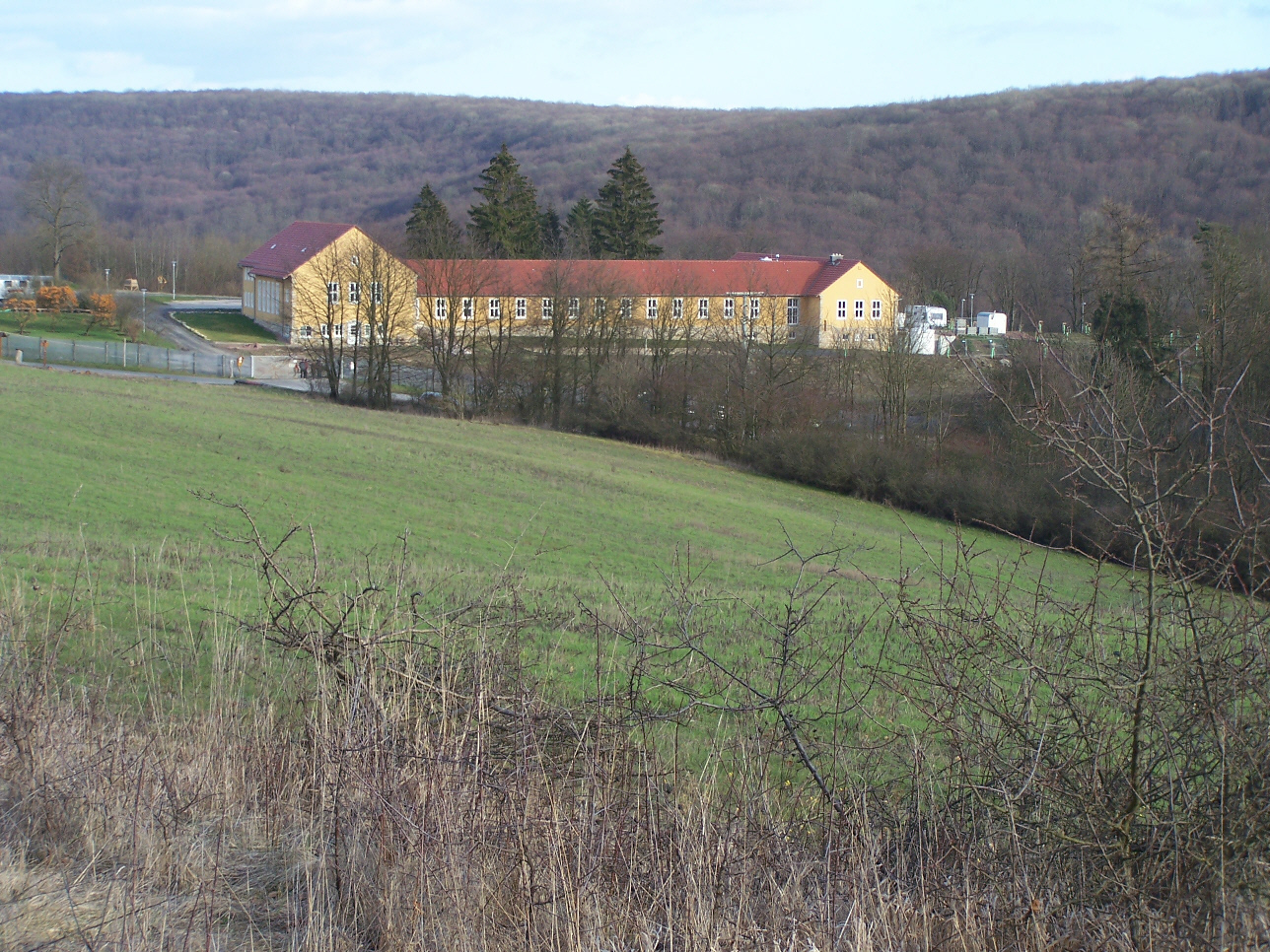
Youth hostel on the Harsberg

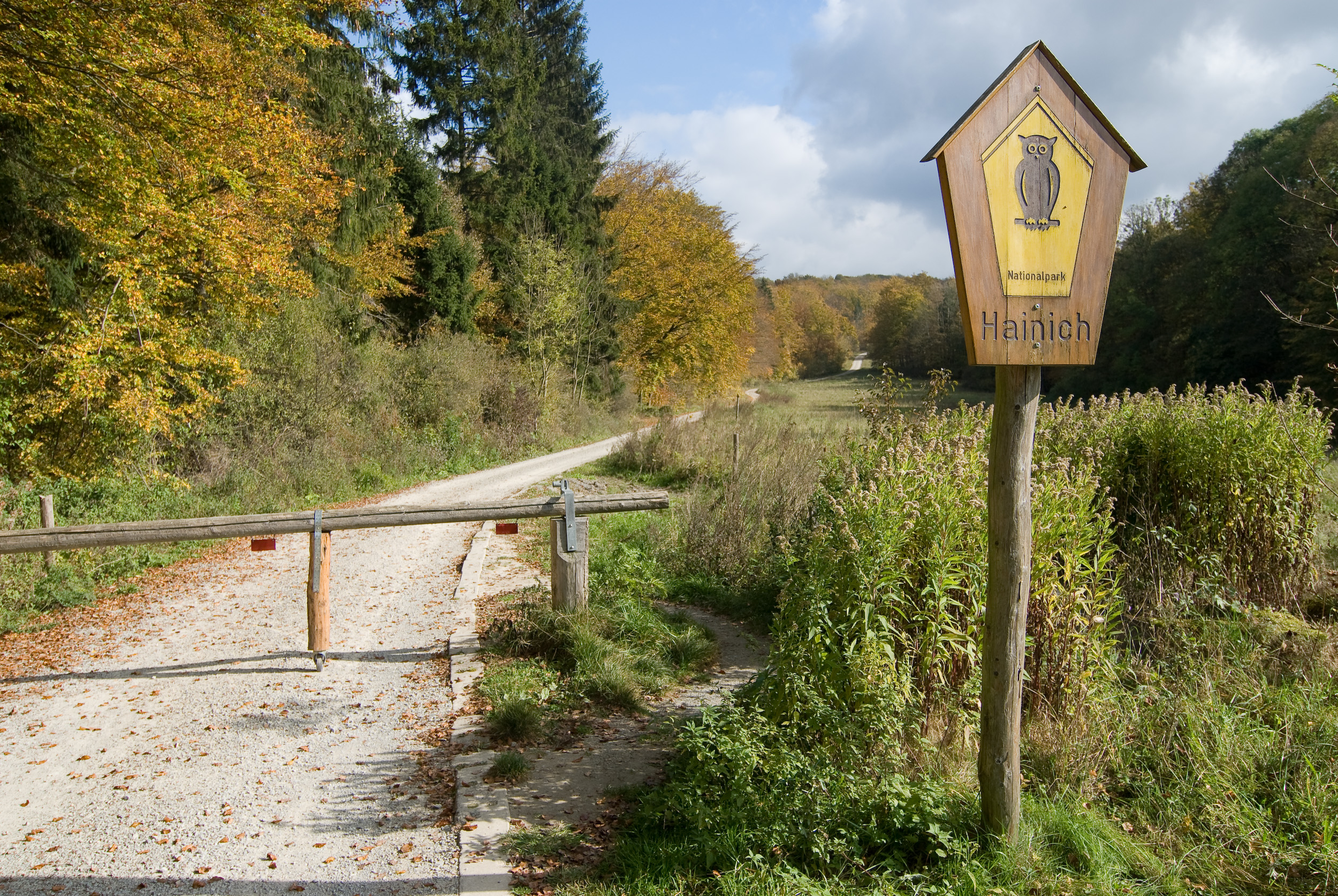
Entrance to the national park in Lauterbach

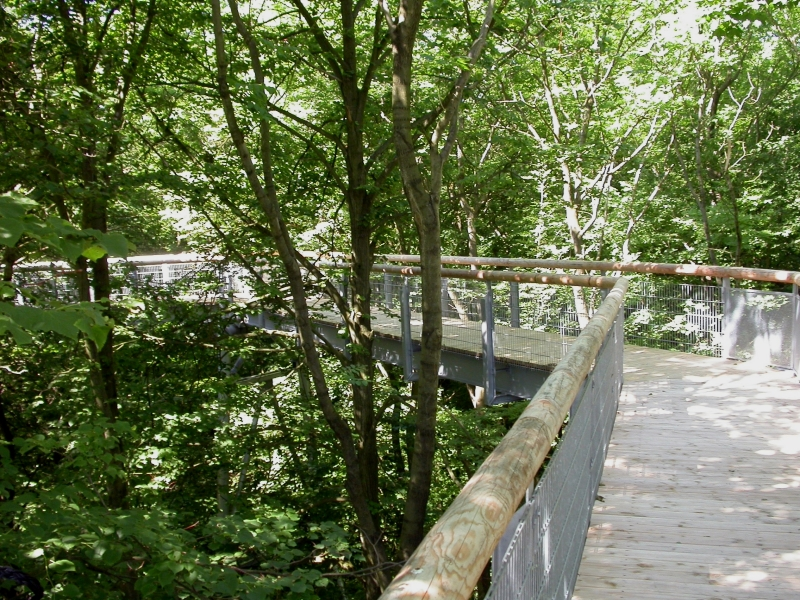
Canopy walkway through the forest (elevation 10–24 m / 33–79 ft)

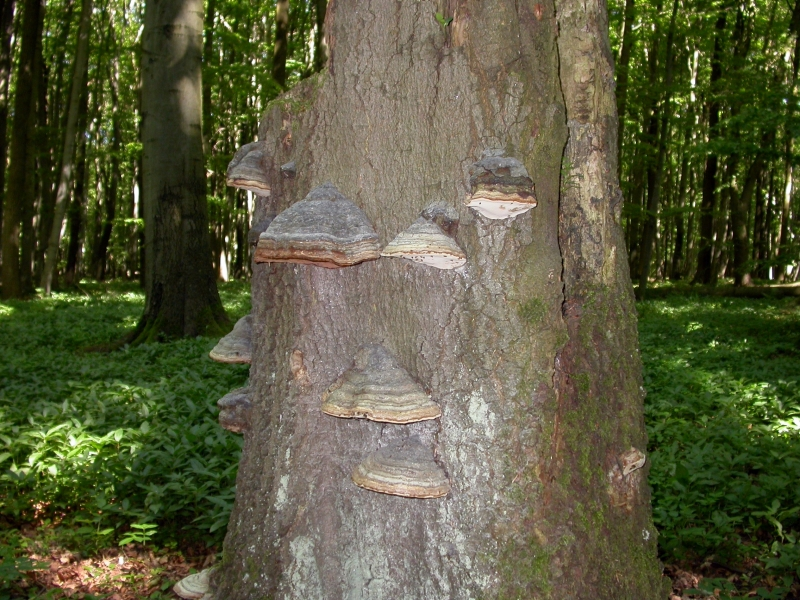
Tree fungus

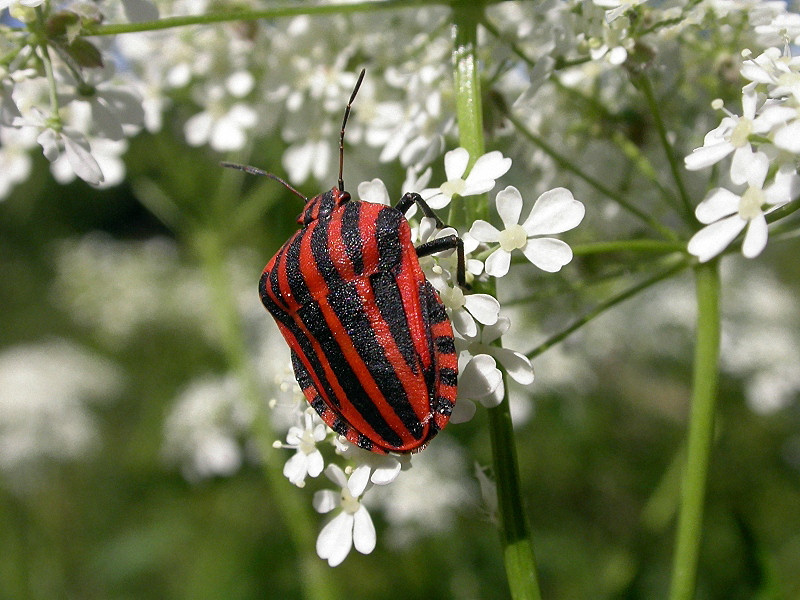
Graphosoma italicum

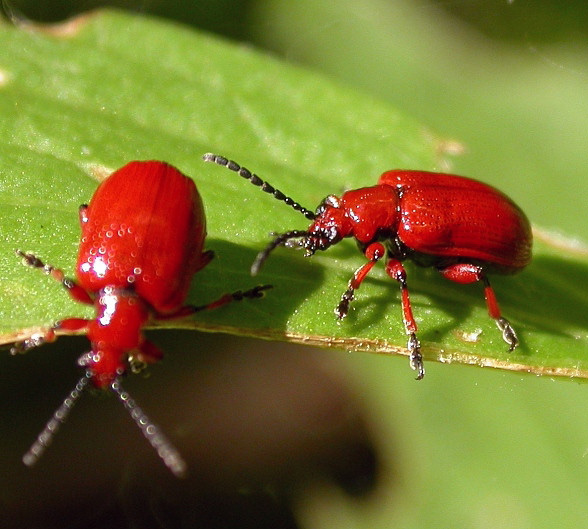
Lilioceris merdigera

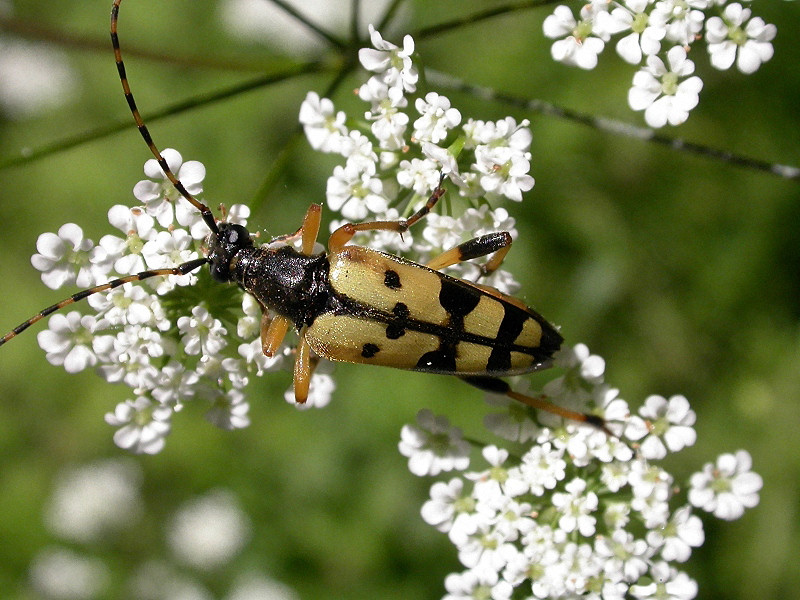
Rutpela maculata

== See also ==
- Alte Burg, an ancient castle site within the park.

== Literature ==
- Hainich Artenbuch – Tiere, Pflanzen und Pilze im Nationalpark Hainich, Verlag Rockstuhl, Bad Langensalza, 2005, ISBN 978-3-937135-37-3

== Films ==
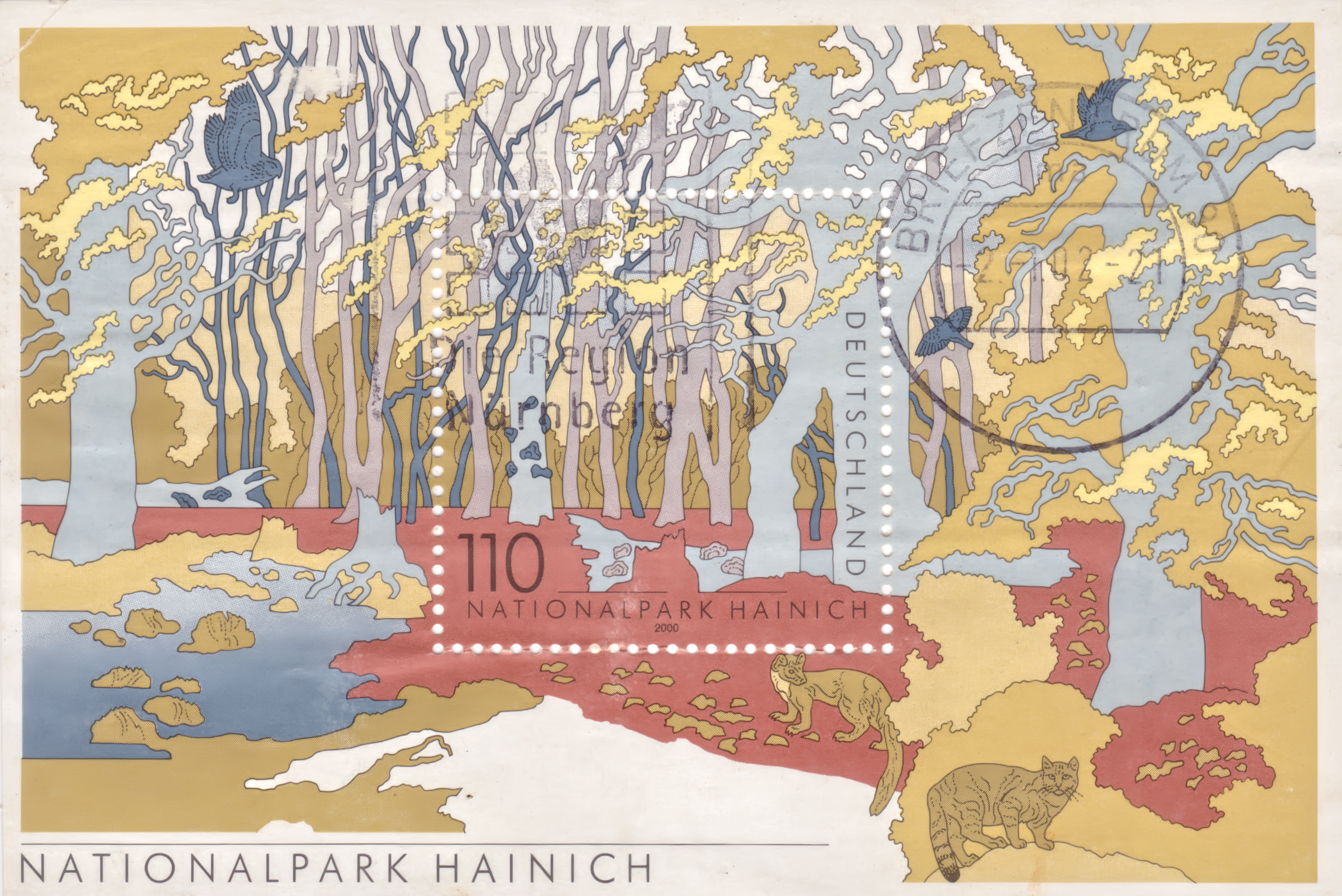
Deutsche Post's 2000 stamp for Hainich National Park

- Nationalpark Hainich: ein Urwald in der Mitte Deutschlands. Documentary, 30 Min., Germany, 1999, by Peter and Stefan Simank, Production: Simank-Filmproduktion, Dresden. Summary by Mitteldeutscher Rundfunk
