= Alte Burg (Berka vor dem Hainich) =

- Berka vor dem Hainich

Site information
- Type: hill castle, spur castle
- Code: DE-TH
- Condition: site, rampart and ditch

Location
- Coordinates: 51°03′30″N 10°24′41″E
- Height: 400 m above sea level (NN)

The Alte Burg is a levelled early historical fortification in the western part of the Hainich National Park in Germany.

== Location ==
The castle site is located about 3 kilometres (as the crow flies) northeast of the centre of the village of Berka vor dem Hainich up the "Long Valley" (Langes Tal), through which a medieval road ran to Craula. It lies immediately above the abandoned village of Sülzrieden.

== Literature ==
- Herrmann Gutbier (1894), Der Hainich. (Reprint) (in German), Bad Langensalza: Verlag Rockstuhl
- Hermann Nebe (1932), "Wallburgen in Westthüringen", Das Thüringer Fähnlein (in German), vol. 2, Jena, pp. 70–77
- Kurt Langlotz (1939), "Götterberge um Eisenach", Das Thüringer Fähnlein (in German), vol. 8, Jena, pp. 459f
- Gemeindeverwaltung Berka v.d.H., ed. (2002), Berka vor dem Hainich. Ein geschichtlicher Überblick (in German), Eisenach: Frisch, p. 40
- Dr. Karcher, "Große Ausgrabungen bei Berka v.d. Hainich", Eisenacher Tagespost Vom 17. Oktober 1936 (in German)
- Heinrich Rempel (1966), Universität Jena (ed.), "Reihengräberfriedhöfe des 8.-11. Jahrhundert (Katalog, Nummer 111)", Schriften der Sektion für Vor- und Frühgeschichte (in German), vol. 20, Jena
- Heinrich Rempel (1958), "Die slawische Zeit im Süden der DDR", Ausgrabungen und Funde (in German), vol. 3, Heft4/5, Berlin, p. 287
- Harald Rockstuhl / Frank Störzner: Hainich-Geschichtsbuch - Wanderung durch die Geschichte eines Naturerbes, Verlag Rockstuhl, Bad Langensalza, 3rd revised edition 31 July 2003, ISBN 978-3-932554-15-5
