= Johannes Menke =

German musicologist (born 1972)

Johannes Menke (born in 1972) is a German music theorist, University lecturer and composer.

== Life ==
Born in Nuremberg, Menke studied oboe, school music and German language and literature in Freiburg im Breisgau, then music theory with Eckehard Kiem and musical composition with Mathias Spahlinger. He received his doctorate in 2004 with a thesis on Giacinto Scelsi at the TU Berlin supervised by Janina Klassen.

From 1999 to 2009, Menke has taught music theory at the Hochschule für Musik Freiburg. Since 2007, he has been professor for historical composition at the Schola Cantorum Basiliensis. From 2008 to 2012 he was president of the Gesellschaft für Musiktheorie.

Menke is editor of the series sinefonia (Wolke-Verlag), the series Praxis und Theorie des Partimentospiels (Florian Noetzel Verlag) and the magazine Musik & Ästhetik. He has published numerous publications on the analysis as well as the history and didactics of music theory, including two textbooks on counterpoint of the Renaissance and Baroque periods (Laaber-Verlag). Up to now he has composed mainly vocal and chamber music.

== Publications ==
- PAX : Analyse bei Giacinto Scelsi: "Tre canti sacri" und "Konx-Om-Pax".
- Kontrapunkt I: Die Musik der Renaissance.
- Kontrapunkt II: die Musik des Barock.
- Schlüsselwerke der Musik.
- François Couperin und seine Zeit.
