= Maloarkhangelsk, Zabaykalsky Krai =

Maloarkhangelsk Малоархангельск
- Selo
- Location within Zabaykalsky Krai Location within Russia
- Coordinates: 50°24′N 108°51′E
- Country: Russia
- Region: Zabaykalsky Krai
- District: Krasnochikoysky District
- Time zone: UTC+9:00

Maloarkhangelsk (Russian: Малоархангельск) is a rural locality (a selo) in Krasnochikoysky District, Zabaykalsky Krai, Russia. Population: 1,001 (2021 census); 947 (2010 census); 992 (2002 census); There are 9 streets in this selo.

== Geography ==
This rural locality is located 7 km from Krasny Chikoy (the district's administrative centre), 377 km from Chita (capital of Zabaykalsky Krai) and 5,083 km from Moscow. Alexandrovka is the nearest rural locality.
