= Shatalovka =

Shatalovka Шаталовка
- Selo
- Location within Belgorod Oblast Location within Russia
- Coordinates: 51°08′N 38°16′E
- Country: Russia
- Region: Belgorod Oblast
- District: Starooskolsky District
- Time zone: UTC+3:00

Shatalovka (Russian: Шатáловка) is a rural locality (a selo) in Starooskolsky District, Belgorod Oblast, Russia. The population was 1,452 as of 2010. There are 32 streets.

== Geography ==
Shatalovka is located 46 km southeast of Stary Oskol (the district's administrative centre) by road. Grinyovka is the nearest rural locality.
