= Oppershausen =

- Municipality
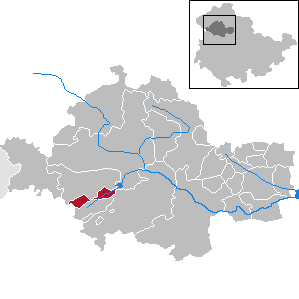
- Location of Oppershausen within Unstrut-Hainich-Kreis district
- Interactive map of Oppershausen
- Location within Germany Location within Thuringia
- Coordinates: 51°8′N 10°27′E
- Country: Germany
- State: Thuringia
- District: Unstrut-Hainich-Kreis

Government
  - Mayor (2018–24): Florian Bäumlein

Area
  - Total: 8.58 km^{2} (3.31 sq mi)
- Elevation: 220 m (720 ft)

Population (2025-12-31)
  - Total: 273
  - Density: 31.8/km^{2} (82.4/sq mi)
- Time zone: UTC+01:00 (CET)
  - Summer (DST): UTC+02:00 (CEST)
- Postal codes: 99986
- Dialling codes: 036028
- Vehicle registration: UH
- Website: www.oppershausen.de

Oppershausen is a municipality in the Unstrut-Hainich-Kreis district of Thuringia, Germany.
