= Eckehard Kiem =

German musician and musicologist

Eckehard Kiem (12 September 1950 – 29 December 2012) was a German music theorist, university professor and composer.

In his major fields of study he concentrated - in addition to a practical and analytical examination of vocal polyphony in Renaissance music, above all on the work and life of Richard Wagner.

== Life ==
Kiem was born in Berka vor dem Hainich. He studied school music, music theory with Peter Förtig and musical composition with Brian Ferneyhough and Klaus Huber as well as German studies and musicology in Mannheim and Freiburg.

Already in 1980 he became professor for music theory at the Hochschule für Musik Freiburg. In the early 1990s he founded the Dufay Ensemble Freiburg, a vocal ensemble specializing in undiscovered or rarely performed music of the late Middle Ages and the Renaissance, and was its member until his death at the age of 62.

From 1998 to 2000 he was on the advisory board of the Staatstheater Stuttgart. He was co-editor of the journal Musik & Ästhetik and author of numerous publications. Together with Ludwig Holtmeier (also Professor of Music Theory and current Rector of the Freiburg University of Music), Kiem published Richard Wagner und seine Zeit.

== Publications ==
- Musik in der Zeit, Zeit in der Musik.
- Présent crénelé : für 6 Frauenstimmen [und Percussion]. (1993)
- Aspekte des Historischen in der Musiktheorie.
- Der Blick in den Abgrund : Zeitstruktur beim späten Beethoven.
- Beziehungszauber und Zeitverhängnis : zur Leitmotivtechnik in "Rheingold", "Walküre" und "Götterdämmerung".
- Angstmusik : Mime und Wozzeck : eine Lanze für "Siegfried I".
- List of 14 publications in the German National Library.
