= Berka vor dem Hainich =

- Municipality
- Coat of arms

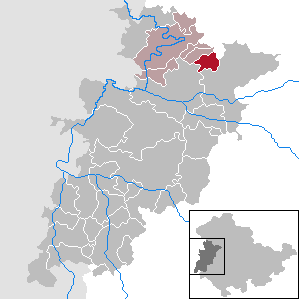
- Location of Berka vor dem Hainich within Wartburgkreis district
- Interactive map of Berka vor dem Hainich
- Location within Germany Location within Thuringia
- Coordinates: 51°2′38″N 10°23′7″E
- Country: Germany
- State: Thuringia
- District: Wartburgkreis
- Municipal assoc.: Hainich-Werratal

Government
  - Mayor (2018–24): Christian Grimm

Area
  - Total: 14.91 km^{2} (5.76 sq mi)
- Elevation: 266 m (873 ft)

Population (2025-12-31)
  - Total: 703
  - Density: 47.1/km^{2} (122/sq mi)
- Time zone: UTC+01:00 (CET)
  - Summer (DST): UTC+02:00 (CEST)
- Postal codes: 99826
- Dialling codes: 036924
- Vehicle registration: WAK

Berka vor dem Hainich (German pronunciation: [ˈbɛʁka foːɐ̯ deːm ˈhaɪnɪç], lit. 'Berka in front of the Hainich') is a municipality in the Wartburgkreis district of Thuringia, Germany.

Nearby is the site of an early historical fortification known as the Alte Burg.

The music theorist Eckehard Kiem (1950–2012) was born in Berka.
