= Maloarkhangelsky District =

Maloarkhangelsky District Малоархангельский район (Russian)
- District
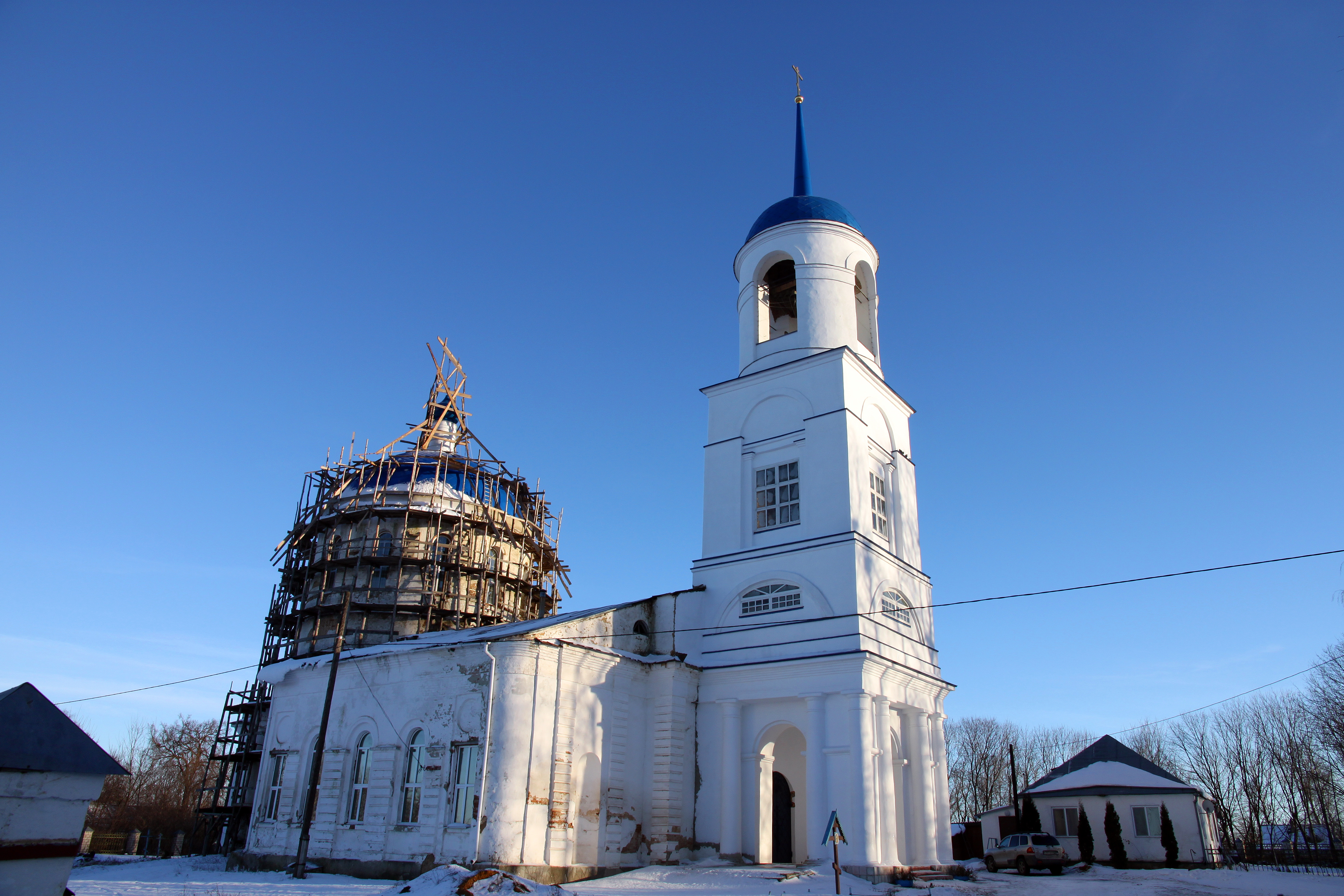
- Intercession church, village Arkharova, Maloarkangelsky District

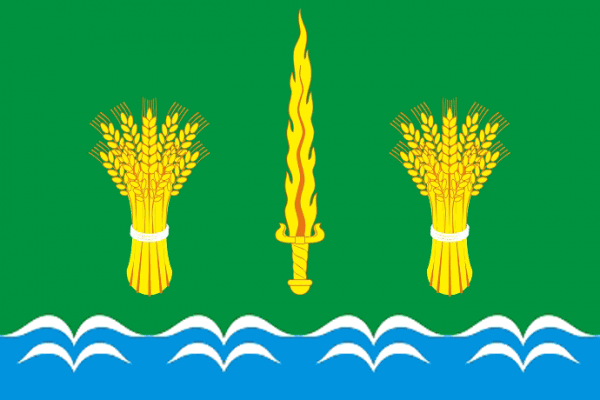
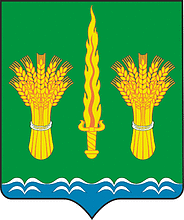
- Flag Coat of arms
- Location of Maloarkhangelsky District in Oryol Oblast
- Coordinates: 52°24′N 36°30′E
- Country: Russia
- Federal subject: Oryol Oblast
- Established: 30 July 1928
- Administrative center: Maloarkhangelsk

Area
  - Total: 754.3 km^{2} (291.2 sq mi)

Population (2010 Census)
  - Total: 11,520
  - Density: 15.27/km^{2} (39.56/sq mi)
  - Urban: 31.4%
  - Rural: 68.6%

Administrative structure
  - Administrative divisions: 1 Towns of district significance, 7 Selsoviets
  - Inhabited localities: 1 cities/towns, 91 rural localities

Municipal structure
  - Municipally incorporated as: Maloarkhangelsky Municipal District
  - Municipal divisions: 1 urban settlements, 7 rural settlements
- Time zone: UTC+3 (MSK)
- OKTMO ID: 54632000
- Website: http://maloarhr.ru/

Maloarkhangelsky District (Russian: Малоарха́нгельский райо́н) is an administrative and municipal district (raion), one of the twenty-four in Oryol Oblast, Russia. It is located in the south of the oblast. The area of the district is 754.3 square kilometers (291.2 sq mi). Its administrative center is the town of Maloarkhangelsk. Population: 11,520 (2010 Census); 13,798 (2002 census); 15,558 (1989 Soviet census). The population of Maloarkhangelsk accounts for 31.4% of the district's total population.
