= Maklok, Voronezh Oblast =

Maklok Маклок
- Settlement
- Interactive map of Maklok
- Location of Maklok Maklok (Voronezh Oblast)
- Coordinates: 51°48′38″N 39°24′53″E
- Country: Russia
- Federal subject: Voronezh Oblast
- Administrative district: Novousmansky District
- Rural settlementSelsoviet: Shuberskoye Rural Settlement

Population
  - Estimate (October 2005): 38 )

Municipal status
  - Municipal district: Novousmansky Municipal District
  - Rural settlement: Shuberskoye Rural Settlement
- Time zone: UTC+3 (MSK)
- Postal code: 396320
- OKTMO ID: 20625499111

Maklok (Russian: Маклок) is a rural locality in Shuberskoye Rural Settlement of Novousmansky District of Voronezh Oblast, Russia, located in a forest 20 kilometers (12 mi) north from the district's administrative center of Novaya Usman. A 2005 district recording estimates the population at 39.
