= Maloarkhangelsk, Oryol Oblast =

Town in Oryol Oblast, Russia

Maloarkhangelsk Малоархангельск
- Town
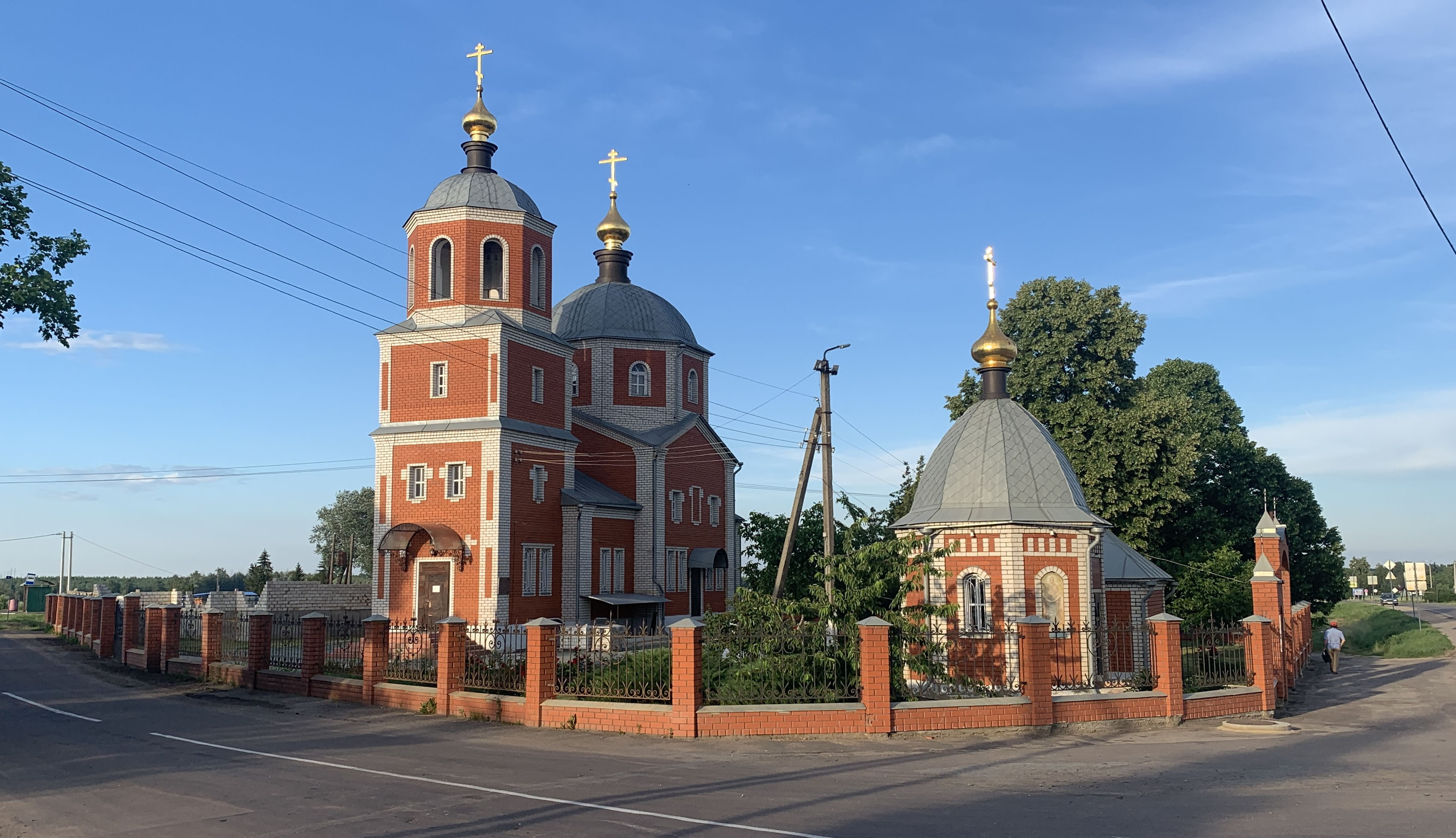

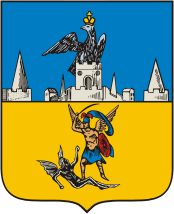
- Coat of arms
- Interactive map of Maloarkhangelsk
- Location of Maloarkhangelsk Maloarkhangelsk (Oryol Oblast)
- Coordinates: 52°24′N 36°30′E
- Country: Russia
- Federal subject: Oryol Oblast
- Administrative district: Maloarkhangelsky District
- Town of district significanceSelsoviet: Maloarkhangelsk
- Founded: 17th century
- Town status since: 1778
- Elevation: 220 m (720 ft)

Population (2010 Census)
  - Total: 3,620
  - Estimate (2023): 3,512 (−3%)

Administrative status
  - Capital of: Maloarkhangelsky District, town of district significance of Maloarkhangelsk

Municipal status
  - Municipal district: Maloarkhangelsky Municipal District
  - Urban settlement: Maloarkhangelsk Urban Settlement
  - Capital of: Maloarkhangelsky Municipal District, Maloarkhangelsk Urban Settlement
- Time zone: UTC+3 (MSK)
- Postal codes: 303369, 303370
- OKTMO ID: 54632101001

Maloarkhangelsk (Russian: Малоарха́нгельск) is a town and the administrative center of Maloarkhangelsky District in Oryol Oblast, Russia, located 82 kilometers (51 mi) south of Oryol, the administrative center of the oblast. Population: 3,620 (2010 census); 3,962 (2002 census); 4,294 (1989 Soviet census).

== History ==
The village of Arkhangelskoye (Арх́ангельское), which was established in the 17th century, was granted town status in 1778 and renamed Maly Arkhangelsky (Ма́лый Арха́нгельский). Later, the name transformed into "Maloarkhangelsk". During World War II, the town was under German occupation from 11 November 1941 until 23 February 1943.

== Administrative and municipal status ==
Within the framework of administrative divisions, Maloarkhangelsk serves as the administrative center of Maloarkhangelsky District. As an administrative division, it is incorporated within Maloarkhangelsky District as the town of district significance of Maloarkhangelsk. As a municipal division, the town of district significance of Maloarkhangelsk is incorporated within Maloarkhangelsky Municipal District as Maloarkhangelsk Urban Settlement.
