= Edmund Wagner =

German fighter pilot during World War II (1914–1941)

- Born: 5 December 1914; Neuhäusel
- Died: 13 November 1941 (aged 26); Pawmutowka, Russia
- Cause of death: Killed in action
- Military career
- Allegiance: Nazi Germany
- Branch: Luftwaffe
- Rank: Oberfeldwebel (staff sergeant)
- Unit: JG 51
- Conflicts: World War II: Battle of Britain; Operation Barbarossa
- Awards: Knight's Cross of the Iron Cross

Edmund Wagner (5 December 1914 – 13 November 1941) was a Luftwaffe ace and recipient of the Knight's Cross of the Iron Cross during World War II. The Knight's Cross of the Iron Cross, and its variants were the highest awards in the military and paramilitary forces of Nazi Germany during World War II. Wagner was killed in action on 13 November 1941 near Pawmutowka, Russia, and was posthumously awarded the Knight's Cross on 17 November 1941. During his career he was credited with 58 Aerial victories, including 57 on the Eastern Front and one on the Western Front.

== Early life and career ==
Wagner was born on 5 December 1914 in Neuhäusel, present-day part of Kirkel, at the time in the Rhine Province within the German Empire. He joined the military of service of the Luftwaffe and following flight and fighter pilot training in the summer of 1940, (Note: Flight training in the Luftwaffe progressed through the levels A1, A2 and B1, B2, referred to as A/B flight training. A training included theoretical and practical training in aerobatics, navigation, long-distance flights and dead-stick landings. The B courses included high-altitude flights, instrument flights, night landings and training to handle the aircraft in difficult situations.) Wagner was posted to 9. Staffel (9th squadron) of Jagdgeschwader 51 (JG 51—51st Fighter Wing), a squadron of III. Gruppe (3rd group) of JG 51. In July 1940, 9. Staffel was commanded by Oberleutnant Arnold Lignitz while III. Gruppe was headed by Hauptmann Hannes Trautloft. The Gruppe had just been formed on 4 July by renaming I. Gruppe of Jagdgeschwader 20 (JG 20—20th Fighter Wing) and integrating it into JG 51 and was based at Saint-Omer, France.

== World War II ==
World War II in Europe had begun on Friday 1 September 1939 when German forces invaded Poland. The Gruppe received new aircraft during the second half of July, bringing its strength nearly to its allotment and flew missions during the Kanalkampf (Channel Battle) during the early phase of the Battle of Britain. On 24 August, Trautloft was transferred and replaced by Hauptmann Walter Oesau as commander of III. Gruppe. On 14 September, Wagner claimed his first aerial victory, a Supermarine Spitfire fighter, during a fighter escort mission to London. On 30 September, Wagner's Staffel was placed under command of Oberleutnant Karl-Heinz Schnell. Command of III. Gruppe changed again on 10 November when Oesau was transferred and command of the Gruppe went to Hauptmann Richard Leppla.

On 26 May 1941, III. Gruppe was withdrawn from the English Channel and relocated to Düsseldorf Airfield for a brief period of rest and replenishment. On 15 June, the Gruppe was ordered to Halászi, at the time in the General Government.

=== Operation Barbarossa ===
On 22 June, German forces launched Operation Barbarossa, the German invasion of the Soviet Union. JG 51 was subordinated to II. Fliegerkorps (2nd Air Corps), which as part of Luftflotte 2 (Air Fleet 2). JG 51 area of operation during Operation Barbarossa was over the right flank of Army Group Center in the combat area of the 2nd Panzer Group as well as the 4th Army. Two days later, III. Gruppe intercepted a large formation of Soviet bombers, claiming 36 of the two-engine bombers shot down. That day Wagner became an "ace-in-a-day" achieved in three combat missions, claiming a single Ilyushin DB-3 and four Tupolev SB bombers shot down. For this he was awarded the Iron Cross 2nd Class (Eisernes Kreuz zweiter Klasse). On 25 June, Wagner claimed three further Soviet bombers shot down. Two days later, following the German advance into the Soviet Union, III. Gruppe moved to Kobryn where they stayed one day before moving to an airfield at Nowo-Hutkowo near Slutsk.

The Gruppe was moved to an airfield at Schatalowka, present-day Shatalovo air base, 40 kilometers (25 miles) southeast of Smolensk, on 28 July during the Battle of Smolensk. That day, Wagner claimed two DB-3 bombers shot down northeast of Yelnya. Flying from Stabna, Wagner claimed four further aerial victories, one on 4 August, one on 10 August and two on 11 August. On 16 August, III. Gruppe was moved to Stabna, located 20 kilometers (12 miles) north of Smolensk. Here Wagner claimed seven aerial victories, including four Mikoyan-Gurevich MiG-3 fighters on 10 September, before moving to Konotop on 13 September.

=== Battle of Moscow and death ===
In early October German forces launched Operation Typhoon, the failed strategic offensive to capture Moscow. On 8 October, III. Gruppe relocated to Yukhnov. During this operation in October and November, Wagner claimed 26 aerial victories, including three on 10 October, two on 17 October, two on 23 October, three on 25 October and two on 6 November.

On 22 October 1941, III. Gruppe moved to an airfield at Maloyaroslavets, located approximately 50 kilometers (31 miles) north of Kaluga and 100 kilometers (62 miles) southwest of Moscow. Here on 13 November, Wagner was killed in action during aerial combat with Petlyakov Pe-2 bombers and a Polikarpov I-153 fighter. His Messerschmitt Bf 109 F-2 (Werknummer 9693—factory number) crashed near Pawmutowka. Posthumously, Wagner was awarded the Knight's Cross of the Iron Cross (Ritterkreuz des Eisernen Kreuzes) on 17 November 1941 for 57 aerial victories claimed. He was the second Luftwaffe pilot credited with more than 50 aerial victories killed.

== Summary of career ==
=== Aerial victory claims ===
According to Aders and Held, Wagner was credited with 58 aerial victories claimed. Weal however lists him with 55 aerial victories claimed. Mathews and Foreman, authors of Luftwaffe Aces – Biographies and Victory Claims, researched the German Federal Archives and found documentation for 57 aerial victory claims on the Eastern Front, plus one further unconfirmed claim on the Western Front.

Chronicle of aerial victories
This and the ♠ (Ace of spades) indicates those aerial victories which made Wagner an "ace-in-a-day", a term which designates a fighter pilot who has shot down five or more airplanes in a single day. This and the ? (question mark) indicates information discrepancies listed by Prien, Stemmer, Rodeike, Bock, Mathews and Foreman.
| Claim | Date | Time | Type | Location | Claim | Date | Time | Type | Location |
– 9. Staffel of Jagdgeschwader 51 – Over England and on the English Channel — 26 June 1940 – 26 May 1941
| 1? (Note: According to Mathews and Foreman this claim is unconfirmed.) | 14 September 1940 | — | Spitfire | | | | | | |
– 9. Staffel of Jagdgeschwader 51 – Operation Barbarossa — 22 June – 13 November 1941
| 2♠ | 24 June 1941 | 10:58 | DB-3 | | 29 | 22 September 1941 | 12:25 | I-61 (MiG-3) | |
| 3♠ | 24 June 1941 | 14:00 | SB-2 | | 30 | 22 September 1941 | 12:25 | I-61 (MiG-3) | |
| 4♠ | 24 June 1941 | 17:50 | SB-2 | | 31 | 1 October 1941 | 06:00 | I-61 (MiG-3) | |
| 5♠ | 24 June 1941 | 17:51 | SB-2 | | 32 | 2 October 1941 | 13:05 | I-61 (MiG-3) | |
| 6♠ | 24 June 1941 | 17:54 | SB-2 | | 33 | 4 October 1941 | 15:15 | I-16 | |
| 7 | 25 June 1941 | 11:25 | SB-2? (Note: According to Mathews and Foreman claimed as a Ilyushin DB-3.) | | 34 | 5 October 1941 | 10:17 | DB-3 | |
| 8 | 25 June 1941 | 11:26 | SB-2? | | 35 | 5 October 1941 | 14:25 | DB-3 | |
| 9 | 25 June 1941 | 11:27 | SB-2? | | 36 | 10 October 1941 | 08:00 | Pe-2 | |
| ? (Note: This claim is not listed by Prien, Stemmer, Rodeike and Bock.) | 26 June 1941 | 15:50 | DB-3 | | 37 | 10 October 1941 | 08:00 | Pe-2 | |
| ? | 26 June 1941 | 15:50 | DB-3 | | 38 | 10 October 1941 | 08:15 | I-61 (MiG-3) | |
| 10 | 26 June 1941 | 15:50 | SB-2? | southeast of Vyhanaščanskaje Lake | 39 | 13 October 1941 | 13:07 | DB-3 | |
| 11 | 26 June 1941 | 15:50 | SB-2? | southeast of Vyhanaščanskaje Lake | 40 | 14 October 1941 | 15:35 | DB-3 | |
| 12 | 11 July 1941 | 15:15 | DB-3 | | 41 | 17 October 1941 | 14:03 | DB-3 | |
| 13 | 14 July 1941 | 19:05 | V-11 (Il-2) | 20 km (12 mi) east of Stara Bychow | 42 | 17 October 1941 | 14:03 | DB-3 | |
| 14 | 15 July 1941 | 10:41 | I-18 (MiG-1) | | 43 | 22 October 1941 | 12:20 | DB-3 | |
| 15 | 28 July 1941 | 17:25 | DB-3 | 30 km (19 mi) northeast of Yelnya | 44 | 23 October 1941 | 13:40 | DB-3 | |
| 16 | 28 July 1941 | 17:30 | DB-3 | 10 km (6.2 mi) northeast of Yelnya | 45 | 23 October 1941 | 15:40 | Pe-2 | |
| 17 | 4 August 1941 | 11:50 | I-153 | | 46 | 24 October 1941 | 13:05 | I-61 (MiG-3) | |
| 18 | 10 August 1941 | 19:15 | DB-3 | | 47 | 25 October 1941 | 11:41 | I-61 (MiG-3) | |
| 19 | 11 August 1941 | 11:00 | I-16 | | 48 | 25 October 1941 | 11:43 | I-61 (MiG-3) | |
| 20 | 11 August 1941 | 11:20 | I-15 | | 49 | 25 October 1941 | 11:45? (Note: According to Mathews and Foreman claimed at 11:43.) | DB-3 | |
| 21 | 17 August 1941 | 09:20 | R-3? (Note: According to Mathews and Foreman claimed as a Ilyushin Il-2.) | | 50 | 27 October 1941 | 08:55 | I-61 (MiG-3) | |
| 22 | 27 August 1941 | 06:00? (Note: According to Mathews and Foreman claimed at 08:00.) | Pe-2 | 15 km (9.3 mi) east of Dukhovshchina | 51 | 28 October 1941 | 15:30 | I-61 (MiG-3) | |
| 23 | 27 August 1941 | 17:57 | I-61 (MiG-3) | | 52 | 29 October 1941 | 12:24 | I-61 (MiG-3) | |
| 24 | 10 September 1941 | 11:40 | I-61 (MiG-3) | | 53 | 5 November 1941 | 15:15 | Pe-2 | |
| 25 | 10 September 1941 | 11:41? (Note: According to Mathews and Foreman claimed at 11:40.) | I-61 (MiG-3) | | 54 | 6 November 1941 | 07:25 | DB-3 | |
| 26 | 10 September 1941 | 11:42? | I-61 (MiG-3) | | 55 | 6 November 1941 | 13:30 | Pe-2 | |
| 27 | 10 September 1941 | 11:43? | I-61 (MiG-3) | | 56 | 12 November 1941 | 09:08 | I-61 (MiG-3) | |
| 28 | 15 September 1941 | 15:50 | DB-3 | | | | | | |

=== Awards ===
- Iron Cross (1939) 2nd and 1st Class
- Honor Goblet of the Luftwaffe (1 September 1941)
- Knight's Cross of the Iron Cross on 17 November 1941 as Oberfeldwebel and pilot in the 9./Jagdgeschwader 51
