= Hans Strelow =

German World War II flying ace

- Strelow as a Leutnant
- Born: 26 March 1922; Berlin, Germany
- Died: 22 May 1942 (aged 20) east of Mtsensk, Soviet Union
- Military career
- Allegiance: Nazi Germany
- Branch: Luftwaffe
- Rank: Leutnant (second lieutenant)
- Unit: JG 51 "Mölders"
- Commands: 5./JG 51
- Conflicts: See battles: World War II Eastern Front Operation Barbarossa Battle of Moscow
- Awards: Knight's Cross of the Iron Cross with Oak Leaves

Hans Strelow (26 March 1922 – 22 May 1942) was a Luftwaffe military aviator during World War II, a fighter ace credited with 68 enemy aircraft shot down in over 200 combat missions, all of which claimed over the Eastern Front.

Born in Berlin, Strelow volunteered for military service in the Luftwaffe of Nazi Germany in 1939. Following flight training, he was posted to Jagdgeschwader 51 (JG 51—51st Fighter Wing) in 1941 and participated in Operation Barbarossa, the German invasion of the Soviet Union. He claimed his first aerial victory on 25 June 1941. In February 1942, Strelow was appointed Staffelkapitän (squadron leader) of the 5. Staffel (5th squadron) of JG 51. Following his 52nd aerial victory, he was awarded the Knight's Cross of the Iron Cross on 18 March 1942. Six days and 14 aerial victories later, he was awarded the Knight's Cross of the Iron Cross with Oak Leaves making him the youngest recipient of the Oak Leaves. Following a forced landing behind enemy lines, Strelow committed suicide on 22 May 1942 to avoid capture by Soviet forces.

== Early life and career ==
Strelow was born on 26 March 1922 in Berlin of the Weimar Republic, the son of a teacher at a Volksschule. Following graduation from school, he joined the military service of the Luftwaffe in 1939. Following flight training as a fighter pilot, (Note: Flight training in the Luftwaffe progressed through the levels A1, A2 and B1, B2, referred to as A/B flight training. A training included theoretical and practical training in aerobatics, navigation, long-distance flights and dead-stick landings. The B courses included high-altitude flights, instrument flights, night landings and training to handle the aircraft in difficult situations.) he was posted to the 5. Staffel (5th squadron) of Jagdgeschwader 51 "Mölders" (JG 51—51st Fighter Wing), a squadron of II. Gruppe (2nd group) of JG 51, in 1941 holding the rank of Leutnant (second lieutenant). At the time, II. Gruppe was commanded by Hauptmann Josef Fözö, and 5. Staffel was headed by Oberleutnant Hans Kolbow.

== World War II ==
World War II in Europe had begun on Friday, 1 September 1939, when German forces invaded Poland. In early June 1941, II. Gruppe of JG 51 was withdrawn from the English Channel and ordered to Dortmund where the unit was reequipped with the Messerschmitt Bf 109 F series. On 10 June, II. Gruppe began transferring east and was located at Siedlce. On 22 June, German forces launched Operation Barbarossa, the German invasion of the Soviet Union. JG 51, under the command of Oberstleutnant Werner Mölders, was subordinated to II. Fliegerkorps (2nd Air Corps), which as part of Luftflotte 2 (Air Fleet 2). JG 51 area of operation during Operation Barbarossa was over the right flank of Army Group Center in the combat area of the 2nd Panzer Group as well as the 4th Army.

=== Operation Barbarossa ===
On 23 June, II. Gruppe followed the German advance and relocated 100 kilometers (62 miles) east to an airfield at Terespol on the Bug. Two days later, the Gruppe claimed 28 Tupolev SB-2 bombers shot down, including Strelow's first aerial victory claimed northeast of Vyhanaščanskaje Lake. The German advance required the Gruppe to relocate approximately 220 kilometers (140 miles) east to an airfield at Nowo-Hutkowo near Slutsk on 28 June. Two days later, II. Gruppe engaged in aerial combat near Babruysk where Strelow claimed his second aerial victory when he shot down a Ilyushin DB-3 bomber. For these victories, Strelow received the Iron Cross 2nd Class (Eisernes Kreuz 2. Klasse) on 5 July. The German advance reached the Dnieper on 9 July.

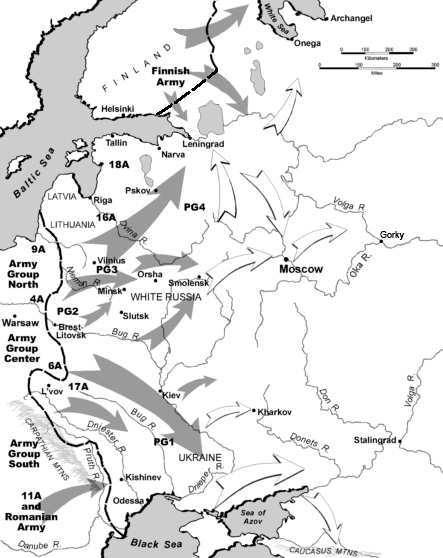
Map indicating Operation Barbarossa's attack plan

German forces breached the Stalin Line and II. Gruppe was moved to an airfield at Stara Bychow, approximately 50 kilometres (31 miles) south of Mogilev on the Dnieper on 12 July. Operating from this airfield on 16 July, Strelow claimed a Vultee V-11 attack aircraft which was an Ilyushin Il-2 attack aircraft. That day, 5. Staffel commanding officer Kolbow was killed in action and was replaced by Leutnant Hans-Joachim Steffens. Steffens was killed in action on 30 July and command of 5. Staffel was then given to Oberleutnant Hartmann Grasser. Following further relocations, II. Gruppe reached an airfield at Schatalowka, present-day Shatalovo air base, 40 kilometers (25 miles) southeast of Smolensk, on 17 August. The Gruppe claimed eleven aerial victories on 30 August, including three by Strelow who shot down two Petlyakov Pe-2 bombers an I-18 fighter, an early German designation for a Mikoyan-Gurevich MiG-1 fighter. On 23 August, elements of II. Gruppe also operated from an airfield near Gomel. On 6 September, Strelow claimed another I-18 fighter followed by an I-61 fighter, an early German designation for a Mikoyan-Gurevich MiG-3 fighter, the following day near Konotop. On 10 September, the Gruppe relocated again and moved to Novhorod-Siverskyi situated on the bank of the Desna River. On 13 September, Strelow claimed DB-3 bomber followed by a Pe-2 bomber east of Konotop the next day, taking his total to eleven aerial victories claimed. For this, Strelow received the Iron Cross 1st Class (Eisernes Kreuz 1. Klasse) on 14 September.

The Gruppe relocated to Sechtschinskaja, approximately 40 km (25 mi) southeast of Roslavl, on 23 September from where the unit flew missions in the combat area east of Konotop. That day, Strelow claimed an I-18 fighter shot down. On 4 October during the Battle of Moscow, II. Gruppe moved to Sevsk for four days. Here Strelow claimed three aerial victories over DB-3 bombers on 5 October. On 11 October, the Gruppe was briefly detached from the Geschwaderstab (headquarters unit) of JG 51 and ordered east to Oryol. There, the Gruppe was subordinated to Gefechtsverband Schönborn (Detachment Schönborn), named after the commander of Sturzkampfgeschwader 77 (StG 77—77th Diver Bomber Wing), Major Clemens Graf von Schönborn-Wiesentheid. Strelow was awarded the Honour Goblet of the Luftwaffe (Ehrenpokal der Luftwaffe) on 24 November. Two days later, II. Gruppe relocated to an airfield at Kaluga, ending the assignment to Gefechtsverband Schönborn. Operating from Kaluga, Strelow claimed a Pe-2 bomber shot down on 5 December northwest of Kashira.

On 30 December, II. Gruppe moved to the Bryansk Airfield where the aircraft were serviced in hangars and the pilots had shelters. From Bryansk, II. Gruppe supported the 2nd Panzer Group as well as the 4th Army in the combat area southwest of Moscow. Here, Strelow claimed his first aerial victories in 1942 on 4 January when he shot down two I-61 fighters. On 13 January, II. Gruppe claimed thirteen aerial victories including two Polikarpov R-Z reconnaissance bomber aircraft by Strelow. On 27 January, Strelow was credited with the destruction of an I-26 fighter, an early German designation for a Yakovlev Yak-1 fighter. Fighting in the Battles of Rzhev against the Kalinin Front in early 1942, II. and IV. Gruppen of JG 51 had become the most successful units of VIII. Fliegerkorps (8th Air Corps). By end-February, three pilots of II. Gruppe had claimed 40 aerial victories, these were Oberfeldwebel Otto Tange, Oberfeldwebel Wilhelm Mink and Strelow.

=== Squadron leader and death ===
On 1 February 1942, Strelow was appointed Staffelführer, a newly-appointed Staffelkapitän (squadron leader), of 5. Staffel of JG 51. He succeeded Oberleutnant Horst Geyer who had temporarily led the Staffel after its former commander, Grasser had taken command of II. Gruppe of JG 51. Strelow was credited with his first aerial victories as Staffelkapitän on 4 February when he claimed four aerial victories on two separate combat missions, the first in the area of Yukhnov, and the second near Kaluga. Strelow claimed his 40th aerial victory on 28 February, a Pe-2 bomber shot down east of Bryansk.

On 18 March, Strelow and fellow JG 51 pilot Oberleutnant Heinrich Krafft were awarded the Knight's Cross of the Iron Cross (Ritterkreuz des Eisernen Kreuzes) for 52 and 46 aerial victories claimed respectively. That day, he became an "ace-in-a-day", claiming seven aerial victories. Six days and 14 aerial victories later, he was awarded the Knight's Cross of the Iron Cross with Oak Leaves (Ritterkreuz des Eisernen Kreuzes mit Eichenlaub) on 24 March for 66 aerial victories. He was the 84th and youngest member of the German armed forces to be so honored. The award was presented by Adolf Hitler at the Führerhauptquartier (Führer Headquarters) at Rastenburg on 26 March 1942. On 30 March, the Luftwaffenpersonalamt (staff department) of the Reichsluftfahrtministerium (Ministry of Aviation) deferred a preferential promotion to Oberleutnant (first lieutenant) on account of his young age. Following the award presentation, Strelow went on home leave.

Following his return to his unit, II. Gruppe was still based at Bryansk but periodically also operated from airfields at Oryol and Dugino. On 18 May, Strelow claimed his 67th aerial victory when he shot down a MiG-3 fighter. Four days later, Strelow died by suicide after he was shot down by a Pe-2 twin-engine bomber in his Bf 109 F-2 "Black 10" (Werknummer 8239—factory number). He had made a forced landing 9 kilometres (5.6 mi) behind Soviet lines near Mtsensk and killed himself to avoid capture by the Red Army. He was succeeded by Oberleutnant Karl-Heinz Schnell as commander of 5. Staffel.

== Summary of career ==
=== Aerial victory claims ===
According to US historian David T. Zabecki, Strelow was credited with 68 aerial victories. Obermaier and Spick list him with 68 aerial victories claimed in over 200 combat missions, and a mission-to-claim ratio of 2.94. Mathews and Foreman, authors of Luftwaffe Aces – Biographies and Victory Claims, researched the German Federal Archives and found documentation for 68 aerial victory claims, all of which claimed on the Eastern Front.

Chronicle of aerial victories
This and the ♠ (Ace of spades) indicates those aerial victories which made Strelow an "ace-in-a-day", a term which designates a fighter pilot who has shot down five or more airplanes in a single day. This and the ? (question mark) indicates information discrepancies listed by Prien, Stemmer, Rodeike, Bock, Mathews and Foreman.
Claim	Date	Time	Type	Location	Claim	Date	Time	Type	Location
– 5. Staffel of Jagdgeschwader 51 – Operation Barbarossa — 22 June – 5 December 1941
1	25 June 1941	10:55	SB-2	northeast of Vyhanaščanskaje Lake	13	5 October 1941	14:26	DB-3	northeast of Sevsk
2	30 June 1941	14:55	DB-3	Babruysk	14	5 October 1941	14:28	DB-3	northeast of Sevsk
3	16 July 1941	16:16	V-11 (Il-2)	east of Stara Bychow	15	5 October 1941	14:29	DB-3	northeast of Sevsk
4	30 August 1941	14:51	Pe-2		16	13 October 1941	11:20	R-3? (Note: According to Mathews and Foreman claimed as a Ilyushin Il-2 ground attack aircraft.)	
5	30 August 1941	14:53	Pe-2		17	14 October 1941	11:15	Il-2	
6	30 August 1941	15:03	I-18 (MiG-1)		18	29 October 1941	07:22	Pe-2	
7	6 September 1941	16:22	I-18 (MiG-1)		19	1 November 1941	14:23	I-15? (Note: According to Mathews and Foreman claimed as a Polikarpov I-153 fighter.)	east of Oryol
8	7 September 1941	17:17	I-61? (Note: According to Mathews and Foreman claimed as a Tupolev SB-2 bomber.)	west of Konotop	20	1 November 1941	15:30	I-16?	east of Oryol
9	9 September 1941	15:05	R-3?		21	5 November 1941	09:57	Douglas (Boston)	
10	13 September 1941	13:08	DB-3		22	6 November 1941	10:13	DB-3	
11	14 September 1941	06:23	Pe-2	east of Konotop	23	15 November 1941	10:25	DB-3	
12	23 September 1941	16:23	I-18 (MiG-1)		24	5 December 1941	10:55	Pe-2	northwest of Kashira
– 5. Staffel of Jagdgeschwader 51 – Eastern Front — 6 December 1941 – 30 April 1942
25	14 December 1941	12:04	DB-3	northeast of Aleksin	46	9 March 1942	11:32	I-61 (MiG-3)	
26	14 December 1941	12:20	Pe-2	northeast of Kaluga	47	9 March 1942	13:35	Pe-2	
27	15 December 1941	12:35? (Note: According to Mathews and Foreman claimed at 12:45.)	I-16		48	11 March 1942	13:37	I-61 (MiG-3)	
28	4 January 1942	12:35	I-61 (MiG-3)		49	16 March 1942	08:35	I-26 (Yak-1)	
29	4 January 1942	12:39	I-61 (MiG-3)		50	16 March 1942	09:25	I-18 (MiG-1)	
30	13 January 1942	11:15	R-Z? (Note: According to Mathews and Foreman claimed as a Polikarpov R-5 aircraft.)		51	16 March 1942	13:52	Pe-2	
31	13 January 1942	11:18	R-Z?		52	16 March 1942	16:35	I-61 (MiG-3)	
32	27 January 1942	12:40	I-26 (Yak-1)		53♠	18 March 1942	12:16	I-61 (MiG-3)	
33	4 February 1942	10:35	R-Z?		54♠	18 March 1942	12:18	I-61 (MiG-3)	
34	4 February 1942	10:40	I-18 (MiG-1)? (Note: According to Mathews and Foreman claimed as a Seversky aircraft.)	south of Yukhnov	55♠	18 March 1942	12:26? (Note: According to Mathews and Foreman claimed at 12:20.)	I-61 (MiG-3)	
35	4 February 1942	15:30	I-61 (MiG-3)		56♠	18 March 1942	12:48	Pe-2	
36	4 February 1942	15:35	I-61 (MiG-3)	east of Kaluga	57♠	18 March 1942	16:12	I-61 (MiG-3)	
37	15 February 1942	15:40	I-18 (MiG-1)		58♠	18 March 1942	16:15	I-61 (MiG-3)	
38	16 February 1942	07:20	Pe-2	east of Bryansk	59♠	18 March 1942	16:18	I-61 (MiG-3)	
39	18 February 1942	11:11	SB-2		60	19 March 1942	07:40	I-18 (MiG-1)	
40	28 February 1942	09:56	Pe-2	east of Bryansk	61	19 March 1942	07:50	I-18 (MiG-1)	
41	6 March 1942	13:55	I-61 (MiG-3)		62	19 March 1942	07:55	Pe-2	
42	6 March 1942	14:00	I-61 (MiG-3)		63	19 March 1942	13:53? (Note: According to Mathews and Foreman claimed at 13:35.)	I-61 (MiG-3)	
43	6 March 1942	17:00	U-2		64	21 March 1942	12:35	I-26 (Yak-1)	
44	6 March 1942	17:10	I-18 (MiG-1)		65	21 March 1942	12:52	I-26 (Yak-1)	
45	8 March 1942	10:53	U-2		66	21 March 1942	14:55	Pe-2	
– 5. Staffel of Jagdgeschwader 51 – Eastern Front — 1 – 22 May 1942
67	18 May 1942	08:18	MiG-3		68	22 May 1942	17:15	Pe-2	east of Mtsensk

=== Awards ===
- Iron Cross (1939)
  - 2nd Class (5 July 1941)
  - 1st Class (14 September 1941)
- Honour Goblet of the Luftwaffe on 24 November 1941 as Leutnant and pilot (Note: According to Obermaier in October 1941.)
- Knight's Cross of the Iron Cross with Oak Leaves
  - Knight's Cross on 18 March 1942 as Leutnant and Staffelführer of the 5./Jagdgeschwader 51 "Mölders"
  - 84th Oak Leaves on 24 March 1942 as Leutnant and Staffelführer in the 5./Jagdgeschwader 51 "Mölders"
