= Karl-Heinz Schnell =

German World War II flying ace

- Born: 10 January 1915; Germany
- Died: 13 March 2013 (aged 98); Costa Rica
- Military career
- Allegiance: Nazi Germany (to 1945)
- Branch: Luftwaffe
- Service years: 1936–1945
- Rank: Major (major)
- Units: Jagdgeschwader 20; Jagdgeschwader 51; Jagdverband 44
- Conflicts: World War II: Battle of Britain; Eastern Front
- Awards: Knight's Cross of the Iron Cross

Karl-Heinz Schnell (10 January 1915 – 13 March 2013) was a German Luftwaffe ace and recipient of the Knight's Cross of the Iron Cross during World War II. For the fighter pilots, it was a quantifiable measure of skill and success. Schnell was widely credited with 72 aerial victories in over 500 combat missions.

== Military career ==
At the start of the war, Lieutenant Karl-Heinz 'Bubi' Schnell was assigned to I. Gruppe of Jagdgeschwader 71 (JG 71—71st Fighter Wing), an independent fighter-group. When this unit was flagged for absorption into Jagdgeschwader 51 (JG 51—51st Fighter Wing) on 1 November 1939 he was transferred to the newly formed 3./JG 20 – itself part of an independent fighter-group but also seconded to JG 51.

Through the opening of the campaign in the west, in May 1940, I./JG 20 met very little aerial opposition covering the advance into Holland and then Belgium. Instead, all attention was focused on the dramatic breakthrough to the south. Indeed, it was only on the day the unit transferred to airfields at Ghent, on 29 September, against the Allied evacuation at Dunkirk, that Schnell got his first victory – an RAF Spitfire. The rest of the French campaign was very quiet – a second victory on 11 June – as JG 51 pushed west down the French coast. But as most other fighter units were sent home to rest before the expected battles with the RAF, JG 51 (and I./JG 20) was left on overwatch on the English Channel. Far from being a quiet respite, it yielded three further victories for Schnell over the next weeks.

A period of leave followed over July and August. On 4 July, I. Gruppe of JG 20 was renamed and became III. Gruppe of JG 51. In consequence, 3. Staffel of JG 20 became the 9. Staffel of JG 51. Upon his return, as the battle neared its climax, he quickly set about making up for lost time, doubling his score to eight in the next busy fortnight as well as earning a promotion to Oberleutnant.

=== Squadron leader ===
On 30 September 1940, Schnell was appointed Staffelkapitän (squadron leader) of 9. Staffel of JG 51. He thus replaced Oberleutnant Arnold Lignitz who was given command III. Gruppe of Jagdgeschwader 54 (JG 54—54th Fighter Wing). On 14 November, his Messerschmitt Bf 109 E-4 (Werknummer 4096—factory number) suffered engine failure and he crashed into the sea. He was later rescued by Seenotdienst, the Luftwaffe air-sea rescue service.

After that, it was obvious that the battle could not be won, and operations therefore wound down. Schnell only scored a solitary victory (on 25 October) in the next nine months on the Channel front, until his unit was finally withdrawn to the Reich in May 1941.

=== Operation Barbarossa ===
It was only a short lay-over though, until transferred to airbases east of Warsaw for the upcoming Operation Barbarossa – the invasion of the Soviet Union. Schnell claimed his first aerial victories on 24 June, downing seven bombers in three missions, making him an "ace-in-a-day" for the first time, when JG 51 in total claimed 82 victories. By the time JG 51 became the first Geschwader to claim 1000 victories in the war, on 30 June, Schnell's own tally had risen to 22.

Schnell soon became one of the leading scorers in III./JG 51, reaching 31 by the end of July. In recognition of this, he was awarded the Knight's Cross of the Iron Cross (Ritterkreuz des Eisernen Kreuzes) on 1 August, becoming the fourth in his Gruppe to be so honoured. When JG 51's collective total reached 2000 victories on 7 September with the Battle of Smolensk raging (doubling in less than ten weeks), Schnell's personal score had risen to 38. Over the rest of the year, as the weather worsened, his unit fought in the major encirclement of Kiev and then in the abortive attack on Moscow.

On 20 August, he was shot down in his Bf 109 F-2 (Werknummer 12973). Wounded in the encounter, following his convalescence, he was transferred to the Ergänzungsgruppe of JG 51, a supplementary training unit which was based in France. Command of 9. Staffel was passed on to Oberleutnant Gottfried Schlitzer. In May 1942, Schnell was transferred from the Ergänzungsgruppe of JG 51 to the Stab of III. Gruppe of JG 51 before he was transferred to II. Gruppe. When Oberleutnant Hans Strelow, the commander of 5. Staffel, was shot down behind enemy lines on 22 May, Schnell was given command of the Staffel on 1 June.

=== Eastern Front ===
Although II./JG 51 covered a very stable part of the front (it stayed based in Bryansk from January to August 1942), there were still sporadic periods of intense air activity, as the Soviets staged offensives to distract and draw off support from their collapsing southern front. Schnell continued to score; he claimed seven in one day (5 July) to take him to 52 victories. A further six (or five) victories on 2 August took his score to 58 victories.

Soon after on 8 August, now as a Hauptmann (captain), he was promoted to command his former unit, III./JG 51, succeeding the long-serving Richard Leppla, his commander since November 1940, who had been severely injured. Based at Novodugino, directly west of Moscow, he was straight away into the frantic battles for air superiority over the Rzhev salient. Forced to bail out twice in the month, he later noted:

"As I was swinging down in my parachute in a wonderful stillness, I thought of those at home. Back home, my parents calmly had their Sunday morning coffee by that time."

Now also burdened with the administrative duties of command, combat opportunities were more limited after his 65th victory in late September. During his tenure, he was awarded the German Cross in Gold (Deutsches Kreuz in Gold) on 10 October 1942 and also oversaw the unit's transition onto the new Fw 190A fighter in November.

On 17 January 1943, in a take-off accident, JG 51's Geschwaderkommodore Karl-Gottfried Nordmann's plane collided with that of I./JG 51 Kommandeur Rudolf Busch, killing the latter. So traumatized was Nordmann by the incident that he refused to fly combat missions again, and Schnell unofficially took over leading the Geschwader in the air. This gave him the opportunity to pick up another half-dozen victories over the next few months, as the German Army finally withdrew from in front of Moscow to straighten the front line.

A lull finally fell over the central front in June 1943. Because of either niggling wounds or his increasingly outspoken criticism of the High Command's running of the campaign he was recalled to Germany.

=== Training commands ===
On 5 June, Schnell was transferred to take command of I. Gruppe of Jagdgeschwader 106, a pilot-training unit. He was temporarily replaced by Hauptmann Herbert Wehnelt until Major Fritz Losigkeit took command of the III. Gruppe on 26 June. But barely a fortnight later, he was again transferred, this time to the Mediterranean theatre to take temporary command of II./JG 53 in the absence of regular Kommandeur Gerhard Michalski, and which had just been pulled out from the invasion of Sicily. In his two-month stay he scored no victories, but supervised the unit's retreat from the toe of Italy, past Naples and Rome, onto Lucca in Tuscany, as the Western Allies prepared to storm ashore onto mainland Europe.

On 24 September 1943, with Michalski's return, Schnell was recalled to I./JG 106. Although promoted to Major on 1 October, he remained "in exile" for the next year. This probably saved his life, unlike so many of his contemporaries left in the meat-grinder that was the last year of the war. He was given command of the JG 102 training unit in August 1944 until it was nominally disbanded on 15 March 1945. By then he was already in hospital nursing his ongoing injuries. On 30 November 1944, Schnell attended a meeting held by the Inspector of Day Fighters, Oberst Günther Lützow at the Altemburg Airfield. Lützow had invited the commanding officers of various Luftwaffe training units to discuss the status of fighter pilot training. Among others, the meeting was attended by Hans von Hahn, Gerhard Koall, Reinhard Seiler, Rolf Hermichen and Josef Fözö.

Schnell was finally drawn back to a front-line unit, answering Johannes Steinhoff's call to join Adolf Galland's band of elite 'malcontents' in JV 44. There he served as Platzausbau officer (in charge of airfield infrastructure) until the end of the war. One of his last duties, on 4 May 1945, was being dispatched by his CO, Heinz Bär, from their final airbase in Salzburg, Austria, to the nearby American forces to get their surrender instructions.

== Later life ==
Released as a prisoner of war in 1947, Schnell moved to Costa Rica. There he died on 13 March 2013 at the age of 98.

== Summary of career ==
=== Aerial victory claims ===
According to US historian David T. Zabecki, Schnell was credited with 72 aerial victories. Spick also lists Schnell with 72 aerial victories claimed in over 500 combat missions. Of these, 11 were claimed over the Western Allies and the remaining 61 on the Eastern Front. Mathews and Foreman, authors of Luftwaffe Aces: Biographies and Victory Claims, researched the German Federal Archives and found records for 68 aerial victory claims, plus three further unconfirmed claims. This figure includes 68 aerial victories on the Eastern Front and seven over the Western Allies.

Victory claims were logged to a map-reference (PQ = Planquadrat), for example "PQ 47554". The Luftwaffe grid map (Jägermeldenetz) covered all of Europe, western Russia and North Africa and was composed of rectangles measuring 15 minutes of latitude by 30 minutes of longitude, an area of about 360 square miles (930 km^{2}). These sectors were then subdivided into 36 smaller units to give a location area 3 km × 4 km (1.9 mi × 2.5 mi) in size.

Chronicle of aerial victories
This and the ♠ (Ace of spades) indicates those aerial victories which made Schnell an "ace-in-a-day", a term which designates a fighter pilot who has shot down five or more airplanes in a single day. This and the – (dash) indicates unconfirmed aerial victory claims for which Schnell did not receive credit. This and the ? (question mark) indicates information discrepancies listed by Prien, Stemmer, Rodeike, Bock, Mathews and Foreman.
| Claim | Date | Time | Type | Location | Claim | Date | Time | Type | Location |
– 3. Staffel of Jagdgeschwader 20 – Battle of France – 10 May – 25 June 1940
| 1 | 29 May 1940 | 19:15 | Spitfire | northeast of Calais | 2? (Note: According to Mathews and Foreman, this claim is unconfirmed.) | 11 June 1940 | 19:35 | Beaufort | Estrées-lès-Crécy |
– 3. Staffel of Jagdgeschwader 20 – At the Channel and over England – 26 June – 3 July 1940
| 3 | 28 June 1940 | 19:20 | Hurricane | 10 km (6.2 mi) west of Calais | 4 | 30 June 1940 | 12:50 | Blenheim | south of Saint-Omer |
– 9. Staffel of Jagdgeschwader 51 – At the Channel and over England – 4 July 1940 – 26 May 1941
| 5 | 24 August 1940 | 09:40 | Curtiss P-36 | | 8 | 4 September 1940 | 14:25 | Spitfire | south of London |
| 6 | 28 August 1940 | 18:10 | Hurricane | Canterbury | 9 | 25 October 1940 | 13:15 | Hurricane | |
| 7? | 4 September 1940 | 14:24 | Spitfire | south of London | | | | | |
– 9. Staffel of Jagdgeschwader 51 – Operation Barbarossa – 22 June – September 1941
| 10♠ | 24 June 1941 | 10:58 | DB-3 | | 25 | 5 July 1941 | 15:23 | DB-3 | |
| 11♠ | 24 June 1941 | 14:00 | SB-2 | | 26 | 11 July 1941 | 06:25 | Pe-2 | |
| 12♠ | 24 June 1941 | 14:00 | SB-2? (Note: According to Mathews and Foreman, claimed as a Ilyushin DB-3.) | | 27 | 11 July 1941 | 14:07 | Pe-2 | |
| 13♠ | 24 June 1941 | 17:51 | SB-2? | | 28 | 11 July 1941 | 19:20 | Pe-2 | |
| 14♠ | 24 June 1941 | 17:52 | SB-2? | | 29 | 13 July 1941 | 16:45 | I-16 | |
| 15♠ | 24 June 1941 | 17:53 | SB-2? | | 30? (Note: This claim is not listed by Mathews and Foreman.) | 13 July 1941 | 16:55 | I-16 | |
| 16♠ | 24 June 1941 | 17:53 | SB-2? | | — | 28 July 1941 | — | DB-3 | |
| 17 | 26 June 1941 | 10:55 | SB-2? | | 31 | 29 July 1941 | 18:10 | DB-3 | |
| 18 | 26 June 1941 | 15:50 | SB-2? | southeast of Vyhanaščanskaje Lake | 32 | 9 August 1941 | 13:05 | Pe-2 | |
| 19 | 29 June 1941 | 17:50 | SB-2? | | 33 | 9 August 1941 | 13:05 | Pe-2 | |
| 20 | 30 June 1941 | 14:28 | DB-3 | | 34 | 9 August 1941 | 13:07 | Pe-2 | |
| 21 | 30 June 1941 | 18:55 | DB-3 | | 35 | 9 August 1941 | 13:09 | Pe-2 | |
| 22 | 30 June 1941 | 19:00 | DB-3 | 5 km (3.1 mi) northeast of Babruysk | 36 | 11 August 1941 | 07:45 | Pe-2 | 30 km (19 mi) northeast of Yelnya |
| 23 | 2 July 1941 | 14:50 | DB-3 | | 37 | 7 September 1941 | 12:25 | Pe-2 | |
| 24 | 5 July 1941 | 15:22 | DB-3 | | 38 | 7 September 1941 | 17:40? (Note: According to Mathews and Foreman, claimed at 12:40 as a Mikoyan-Gurevich MiG-3.) | I-16? | |
– Stab III. Gruppe of Jagdgeschwader 51 – Eastern Front – May 1942
| 39 | 28 May 1942 | 09:35 | Il-2 | Yukhnov/Roslavl | | | | | |
– 5. Staffel of Jagdgeschwader 51 – Eastern Front – 1 June – 15 September 1942
| 40 | 14 June 1942 | 07:30 | Pe-2 | | 52♠ | 2 August 1942 | 13:15 | Il-2 | PQ 47554; 20 km (12 mi) north of Vozma |
| 41 | 15 June 1942 | 04:28 | Pe-2? (Note: According to Mathews and Foreman, claimed as a Ilyushin Il-2.) | Oryol | 53♠ | 2 August 1942 | 13:20 | Il-2 | PQ 47552; 15 km (9.3 mi) north-northwest of Rzhev |
| 42 | 24 June 1942 | 09:52 | Yak-4 | Oryol | 54♠ | 2 August 1942 | 13:25 | Il-2 | PQ 47542; 10 km (6.2 mi) west of Rzhev |
| 43 | 26 June 1942 | 08:40 | Il-2? (Note: According to Mathews and Foreman, claimed as a Petlyakov Pe-2.) | Oryol | 55♠ | 2 August 1942 | 15:12? (Note: According to Mathews and Foreman, claimed at 15:10.) | Il-2 | PQ 47553; 15 km (9.3 mi) north-northwest of Rzhev |
| 44 | 2 July 1942 | 17:50 | DB-3? | Rzhev | 56♠ | 2 August 1942 | 16:37? (Note: According to Mathews and Foreman, claimed at 18:37.) | Il-2 | PQ 47581, Dugino; 10 km (6.2 mi) west of Rzhev |
| 45 | 4 July 1942 | 17:20 | Il-2 | Rzhev | 57 | 3 August 1942 | 12:35 | Il-2 | PQ 47554; 15 km (9.3 mi) north-northwest of Rzhev |
| 46♠ | 5 July 1942 | 10:30 | Il-2 | | 58 | 8 August 1942 | 18:24 | Pe-2 | PQ 47524; 20 km (12 mi) north-northwest of Rzhev |
| 47♠ | 5 July 1942 | 11:50 | Pe-2 | | 59 | 13 August 1942 | 17:00? (Note: According to Mathews and Foreman, claimed at 17:08.) | Il-2 | PQ 54414; 30 km (19 mi) northeast of Dudorovskiy |
| 48♠ | 5 July 1942 | 17:35 | Il-2 | | 60 | 22 August 1942 | 16:01 | Pe-2 | PQ 54434; 20 km (12 mi) southwest of Belyov |
| 49♠ | 5 July 1942 | 17:36 | Il-2 | | 61 | 22 August 1942 | 18:35 | Il-2 | PQ 54421; 25 km (16 mi) west-southwest of Belyov |
| 50♠ | 5 July 1942 | 18:05 | Il-2 | | 62 | 23 August 1942 | 17:31 | Il-2 | PQ 54414; 30 km (19 mi) northeast of Dudorovskiy |
| — ? | 5 July 1942 | 18:06 | Il-2 | | 63 | 5 September 1942 | 17:03 | Il-2 | southeast of Sychyovka |
| 51♠ | 5 July 1942 | 19:22 | Il-2 | northeast of Bolkhov | | | | | |
– Stab III. Gruppe of Jagdgeschwader 51 – Eastern Front – 24 September 1942 – 3 February 1943
| 64 | 26 September 1942 | 12:25 | LaGG-3 | PQ 47521; 20 km (12 mi) north-northwest of Rzhev | 66 | 29 January 1943 | 10:22 | Il-2 | PQ 63451; 20 km (12 mi) north-northeast of Maloarkhangelsk |
| 65 | 29 January 1943 | 10:20 | Il-2 | PQ 63451; 20 km (12 mi) north-northeast of Maloarkhangelsk | 67 | 29 January 1943 | 10:25 | Il-2 | PQ 63451; 20 km (12 mi) north-northeast of Maloarkhangelsk |
– Stab III. Gruppe of Jagdgeschwader 51 – Eastern Front – 4 February – 5 June 1943
| 68 | 6 February 1943 | 13:25 | Il-2 | PQ 35 Ost 63624; 25 km (16 mi) east-northeast of Maloarkhangelsk | 70 | 9 March 1943 | 08:12 | LaGG-3 | PQ 35 Ost 63294, southwest of Novosil; 25 km (16 mi) southeast of Zalegoshch |
| 69 | 24 February 1943 | 10:25 | Il-2 | PQ 35 Ost 44434; 10 km (6.2 mi) east of Zhizdra | 71 | 13 May 1943 | 05:10 | LaGG-3 | PQ 35 Ost 63223; 10 km (6.2 mi) east of Zalegoshch |

=== Awards ===
- Iron Cross (1939) 2nd and 1st Class
- Knight's Cross of the Iron Cross on 1 August 1941 as Oberleutnant and Staffelkapitän of the 9./Jagdgeschwader 51 (Note: According to Scherzer as Staffelkapitän of the 8./Jagdgeschwader 51.)
- German Cross in Gold on 10 October 1942 as Hauptmann in the 5./Jagdgeschwader 51

== Notes ==
Military offices
| Preceded by Oblt Arnold Lignitz | Squadron Leader of 9./JG 51; 30 September 1940 – 2 November 1941 | Succeeded by Oblt Gottfried Schlitzer |
| Unknown | Squadron Leader of 5./JFS 5; 3 November 1941 – 26 April 1942 | Unknown |
| Preceded by Ltn Hans Strelow | Squadron Leader of 5./JG 51; 1 June 1942 – 8 August 1942 | Succeeded by Ltn Ralph Furch |
| Preceded by Hptm Richard Leppla | Group Commander of III./JG 51; 25 September 1942 – 5 June 1943 | Succeeded by Hptm Fritz Losigkeit |
| Preceded by Maj Hans Mihlan | Group Commander of I./JG 106; 23 June 1943 – 9 July 1943 | Succeeded by Hptm Friedrich Kerkmann |
| Preceded by Hptm Gerhard Michalski | Group Commander of II./JG 53; 10 July 1943 – 28 September 1943 | Succeeded by Hptm Gerhard Michalski |
| Preceded by Hptm Friedrich Kerkmann | Group Commander of I./JG 106; 29 September 1943 – 31 July 1944 | Succeeded by Hptm Max Buchholz |
| Preceded by Obstlt Jürgen Roth | Group Commander of I./JG 102; 1 August 1944 – 15 March 1945 | Succeeded by none: unit disbanded |
