= Otto Tange =

German flying ace (1915–1943)

- Born: 22 September 1915; Hochdonn
- Died: 30 July 1943 (aged 27); Bolkhov
- Cause of death: Killed in action
- Military career
- Allegiance: Nazi Germany
- Branch: Luftwaffe
- Service years: ?–1943
- Rank: Oberleutnant (first lieutenant)
- Unit: JG 51
- Conflicts: World War II: Battle of France; Battle of Britain; Operation Barbarossa; Battle of Kursk
- Awards: Knight's Cross of the Iron Cross

Otto Tange (22 September 1915 – 30 July 1943) was a Luftwaffe ace and recipient of the Knight's Cross of the Iron Cross during World War II. Tange claimed 68 aerial victories, 3 over the Western Front and 65 over the Eastern Front. The Knight's Cross of the Iron Cross, and its variants were the highest awards in the military and paramilitary forces of Nazi Germany during World War II.

== Career ==
Tange was born on 22 September 1915 in Hochdonn in the Province of Schleswig-Holstein within the German Empire.

He was a member of the Luftwaffe at the beginning of the war and participated in the Battle of France and the Battle of Britain. During the Battle of Britain he claimed his first three victories. Tange then participated in Operation Barbarossa, by the end of 1941 he claimed 33 more victories.

Fighting in the Battles of Rzhev against the Kalinin Front in early 1942, II. and IV. Gruppen of JG 51 had become the most successful units of VIII. Fliegerkorps (8th Air Corps). By end-February, three pilots of II. Gruppe had claimed 40 aerial victories, these were Leutnant Hans Strelow, Oberfeldwebel Wilhelm Mink and Tange. On 19 March 1942, Tange was awarded the Knight's Cross of the Iron Cross (Ritterkreuz des Eisernen Kreuzes) for 40 aerial victories claimed.

On 11 July 1943, Tange was posted to the Stabsstaffel of Jagdgeschwader 51 (JG 51—51st Fighter Wing). (Note: In early October 1942, II. Gruppe of JG 51 had been withdrawn from the Eastern Front and sent to Jesau, near present-day Bagrationovsk, to Heiligenbeil, present-day Mamonovo, to be reequipped with the Focke-Wulf Fw 190 A. While undergoing training on this aircraft, the Gruppe received orders on 4 November to transfer to the Mediterranean theatre flying the Messerschmitt Bf 109 again. 6. Staffel had been exempt from this order, was detached from II. Gruppe, and continued its training on the Fw 190. In late November, 6. Staffel was renamed to Stabsstaffel (headquarters squadron) of JG 51. Alternatively, the Stabsstaffel was also referred to as Geschwaderstabsstaffel z.b.V., roughly translating to fighter wing squadron for special deployment'. The abbreviation z. b. V. is German and stands for zur besonderen Verwendung (for special deployment).) On 30 July, his third mission with the Stabsstaffel, Tange was killed in action when his Focke-Wulf Fw 190 A-6 was hit by Soviet anti-aircraft artiller 35 kilometers (22 miles) southwest of Bolkhov. Posthumously, Tange was promoted to Oberleutnant (first lieutenant).

== Summary of career ==
=== Aerial victory claims ===
According to US historian David T. Zabecki, Tange was credited with 68 aerial victories. Spick also lists him with 68 aerial victories claimed in 426 combat missions and a mission-to-claim ratio of 6.26. Mathews and Foreman, authors of Luftwaffe Aces — Biographies and Victory Claims, researched the German Federal Archives and found records for 63 aerial victory claims, plus two further unconfirmed claims. This number includes one claim on the Western Front with others claimed on the Eastern Front.

Chronicle of aerial victories
This and the ? (question mark) indicates information discrepancies listed by Prien, Stemmer, Rodeike, Bock, Mathews and Foreman.
Claim	Date	Time	Type	Location	Claim	Date	Time	Type	Location
– 5. Staffel of Jagdgeschwader 51 – At the Channel and over England — 26 June 1940 – 7 June 1941
1? (Note: According to Mathews and Foreman, this claim was unconfirmed.)	10 July 1940	12:10	Spitfire	northwest of Dover	3	5 March 1941	15:14	Spitfire	Le Touquet
2?	15 August 1940	20:05	Hurricane	south of Clacton-on-Sea					
– 5. Staffel of Jagdgeschwader 51 – Operation Barbarossa — 22 June – 5 December 1941
4	25 June 1941	10:55	SB-2	northeast of Vyhanaščanskaje Lake	20	6 September 1941	09:48	I-16	10 km (6.2 mi) north of Bryansk
5	25 June 1941	10:55	SB-2	northeast of Vyhanaščanskaje Lake	21	9 September 1941	13:42	Pe-2	10 km (6.2 mi) northeast of Konotop
6	25 June 1941	11:00	SB-2	northeast of Vyhanaščanskaje Lake	22	9 September 1941	16:13	Pe-2	10 km (6.2 mi) northeast of Novgorod
7	30 June 1941	08:05	SB-3	50 km (31 mi) east of Sevsk	23	13 September 1941	10:03	DB-3	15 km (9.3 mi) east of Konotop
8	1 July 1941	14:17	I-16	3 km (1.9 mi) northeast of Horodok	24	13 September 1941	10:07	DB-3	20 km (12 mi) east of Konotop
9	12 July 1941	17:51	DB-3	10 km (6.2 mi) east of Shklow	25	13 September 1941	10:12	DB-3	27 km (17 mi) east of Konotop
10	12 July 1941	17:55	DB-3	24 km (15 mi) east of Shklow	26	14 September 1941	16:28	V-11 (Il-2)	35 km (22 mi) southwest of Konotop
11	13 July 1941	12:20	Pe-2	10 km (6.2 mi) southeast of Gorki	27	14 September 1941	16:33	V-11 (Il-2)	35 km (22 mi) southwest of Konotop
12	15 July 1941	18:33	DB-3	20 km (12 mi) west of Mstislawl	28	27 September 1941	11:10	I-18 (MiG-1)	40 km (25 mi) east of Schatalowka
13	16 July 1941	12:45	DB-3	3 km (1.9 mi) south of Smolensk	29	4 October 1941	12:16 (MiG-1)	I-18	20 km (12 mi) east of Dmitrovsk
14	28 July 1941	16:59	V-11 (Il-2)	8 km (5.0 mi) north of Propojsk	30	4 October 1941	12:43	DB-3	25 km (16 mi) east of Kromy
15	23 August 1941	18:00	DB-3	Wysokaja	31	29 October 1941	12:50	DB-3	30 km (19 mi) east of Mtsensk
16	30 August 1941	17:19	I-61 (MiG-3)	5 km (3.1 mi) east of Stajnja	32	28 November 1941	13:05	I-18 (MiG-1)	10 km (6.2 mi) east of Venyov
17	1 September 1941	16:18	R-3	7 km (4.3 mi) east of Sechtschinskaja	33	2 December 1941	12:38	I-18 (MiG-1)	15 km (9.3 mi) west of Moscow
18	2 September 1941	09:31	R-3	8 km (5.0 mi) east of Sechtschinskaja	34	2 December 1941	15:02	I-18	25 km (16 mi) northwest of Moscow
19	2 September 1941	09:34	R-3	20 km (12 mi) southeast of Sechtschinskaja	35	4 December 1941	12:53	I-61 (MiG-3)	10 km (6.2 mi) south of Kaschira
– 5. Staffel of Jagdgeschwader 51 "Mölders" – Eastern Front — 6 December 1941 – 30 April 1942
36	14 December 1941	13:28	Pe-2	35 km (22 mi) south of Serpukhov	43	5 April 1942	12:18	MiG-3	30 km (19 mi) northeast of Scharkowka airfield
37	13 January 1942	15:03	DB-3	40 km (25 mi) west of Kaluga	44	6 April 1942	11:25	Yak-1	5 km (3.1 mi) west of Mosalsk airfield
38	21 January 1942	12:23	Pe-2	5 km (3.1 mi) south of Terenowka	45	6 April 1942	11:28	Yak-1	5 km (3.1 mi) west of Mosalsk airfield
39	27 January 1942	13:09	R-Z	Mozhaysk airfield	46	6 April 1942	11:32	Yak-1	5 km (3.1 mi) west of Mosalsk airfield
40	27 January 1942	13:21	R-Z	5 km (3.1 mi) south of Mozhaysk airfield	47	6 April 1942	11:34	Yak-1	5 km (3.1 mi) west of Mosalsk airfield
41	31 March 1942	14:55	I-16	5 km (3.1 mi) west of Klimowo airfield	48	27 April 1942	18:03	I-16	10 km (6.2 mi) northeast of Mtsensk
42	5 April 1942	09:47	Yak-1	5 km (3.1 mi) west of Mosalsk airfield					
– 5. Staffel of Jagdgeschwader 51 "Mölders" – Eastern Front — 1 May – 7 October 1942
49	16 May 1942	18:45	Boston	5 km (3.1 mi) east of Shulie	58	27 August 1942	17:57	Il-2	15 km (9.3 mi) northeast of Oryol
50	16 May 1942	18:47	Yak-1	7 km (4.3 mi) northeast of Shulie	59	29 August 1942	11:42	Il-2	18 km (11 mi) southwest of Kosalsk
51	16 May 1942	18:50	Yak-1	5 km (3.1 mi) northeast of Kudinowo	60	29 August 1942	11:47	Il-2	15 km (9.3 mi) southwest of Kosalsk
52	12 August 1942	12:15	MiG-3	4 km (2.5 mi) west of Belyov	61	5 September 1942	17:04	Il-2	11 km (6.8 mi) southeast of Sychyovka
53	22 August 1942	12:05	MiG-3	6 km (3.7 mi) west of Kosalsk	62	14 September 1942	09:53	Il-2	PQ 47641
54	22 August 1942	18:10	MiG-3	4 km (2.5 mi) west of Belyov	63	14 September 1942	10:02	MiG-3	PQ 47563
55	23 August 1942	06:43	Pe-2	18 km (11 mi) east of Uljanowo	64	14 September 1942	10:09	Il-2	PQ 47524
56	23 August 1942	06:48	Il-2	18 km (11 mi) east of Uljanowo	65	30 September 1942	12:08	R-5	PQ 47484
57	27 August 1942	17:49	MiG-3	13 km (8.1 mi) northeast of Oryol					

=== Awards ===
- Iron Cross (1939) 2nd and 1st Class
- Honor Goblet of the Luftwaffe on 1 September 1941 as Feldwebel in a Jagdgeschwader
- German Cross in Gold on 24 November 1941 as Feldwebel in the 5./Jagdgeschwader 51
- Knight's Cross of the Iron Cross on 19 March 1942 as Oberfeldwebel and pilot in the 4./Jagdgeschwader 51 "Mölders"
