= Josef Fözö =

Austrian Luftwaffe pilot (1912–1979)

- Born: 7 November 1912; Vienna
- Died: 4 March 1979 (aged 66); Vienna
- Burial place: Vienna Central Cemetery
- Military career
- Allegiance: First Austrian Republic; Federal State of Austria; Nazi Germany
- Branch: Österreichische Luftstreitkräfte (1935–38); Luftwaffe (1938–45)
- Service years: 1935–1945
- Rank: Major (major)
- Nickname: "Joschko"
- Units: Condor Legion; JG 72, JG 71, JG 51, JG 108
- Commands: II./JG 51, I./JG 51
- Conflicts: Spanish Civil War; World War II: Battle of France; Battle of Britain; Eastern Front
- Awards: Knight's Cross of the Iron Cross

Josef "Joschko" Fözö (7 November 1912 – 4 March 1979) was a Luftwaffe ace and recipient of the Knight's Cross of the Iron Cross during World War II. The Knight's Cross of the Iron Cross, and its variants were the highest awards in the military and paramilitary forces of Nazi Germany during World War II.

== Early life and career ==
Fözö was born on 7 November 1912 in Vienna, the capital of Austria. He joined the Austrian Luftstreitkräfte before transferring to the Luftwaffe in 1938. From the summer of 1938 until March 1939, Fözö flew with 3. Staffel (3rd squadron) of Jagdgruppe 88 during the Spanish Civil War in support of Nationalist forces, claiming three aerial victories. During his service in Spain, 3.Staffel was first commanded by Oberleutnant Werner Mölders, and then by Oberleutnant Hubertus von Bonin. Fözö, who flew 147 combat missions in Spain, was awarded the Spanish Cross in Gold with Swords(Spanienkreuz in Gold mit Schwertern).

On 24 June 1939, the Oberkommando der Luftwaffe (Luftwaffe High Command) ordered the formation Jagdgeschwader 71 (JG 71—71st Fighter Wing). On 15 July, two Staffeln were created at Schleißheim Airfield from elelements of I. Gruppe of Jagdgeschwader 51 (JG 51—51st Fighter Wing). Fözö was appointed Staffelkapitän (squadron leader) of 2. Staffel which was equipped with the Messerschmitt Bf 109 D-1. In preparation for war on 26 August, JG 71 was ordered to Fürstenfeldbruck Airfield to provide fighter protection for Munich and then to Böblingen Airfield on 29 August.

== World War II ==
World War II in Europe began on Friday 1 September 1939 when German forces invaded Poland. On 3 October, the creation of II. Gruppe (2nd group) of Jagdgeschwader 51 (JG 51—51st Fighter Wing) from JG 71 was ordered. Formation began on 16 October and was completed on 1 November at Fürstenfeldbruck Airfield. In consequence, Fözö's 2. Staffel of JG 71 became the 4. Staffel of JG 51.

Fözö claimed his first aerial victory on 16 April 1940 when he shot down a tethered balloon during the "Phoney War" period preceding the Battle of France. On 8 July 1940, he claimed the Supermarine Spitfire of Squadron Leader Desmond Cooke shot down. Cooke was the commanding officer of Royal Air Force (RAF) No. 65 Squadron who was killed in action that day. On 13 July during the Kanalkampf phase of the Battle of Britain, the Luftwaffe attacked convoy CW 5 which had left the Port of Dover. On this mission, Fözö and his wingman, Unteroffizier Ernst Buder engaged a formation of B Flight of No. 56 Squadron led by Flight Lieutenant John Coghlan. In this encounter, Fözö was credited with two Hawker Hurricane fighters shot down. On 31 July a Spitfire of No. 74 Squadron flown by Pilot Officer Harold Gunn, who was killed. Three kills were claimed on 16 August, a Hurricane of No. 501 Squadron (F/L Stoney killed) on 18 August.

On 24 August, Fözö may have damaged and claimed shot down Pilot Officer James Lockhart from No. 85 Squadron northwest of Dover. Lockhart managed to crash land his Hurricane at Hawkinge and was hospitalized.

Another Spitfire was claimed on 26 August (of No. 616 Squadron; F/O Moberly killed).

On 20 February 1941, Fözö was appointed Gruppenkommandeur (group commander) of II. Gruppe of JG 51. He replaced Hauptmann Günther Matthes who was transferred. Command of 4. Staffel was thus passed on to Oberleutnant Erich Hohagen.

=== War against the Soviet Union ===
On 2 July 1941, Fözö was awarded the Knight's Cross of the Iron Cross (Ritterkreuz des Eisernen Kreuzes) for 22 aerial victories claimed. On 11 July, Fözö was badly injured in a take-off accident at Stary Bykhaw in Bf 109 F-2 (Werknummer 12836—factory number). In consequence, command of II. Gruppe was temporarily passed on to Hauptmann Hubertus von Bonin.

Following his convalescence, Fözö was given command of I. Gruppe of JG 51, replacing Hauptmann Wilhelm Hachfeld who was transferred. The Gruppe was based at Rjelbitzi airfield, located 26 kilometers (16 miles) north of Dno and 15 kilometers (9.3 miles) west-southwest of Soltsy on the northern bank of the Shelon. On 24 May, the Gruppe moved to an airfield at Tuleblya, located southwest of Lake Ilmen between Staraya Russa and Dno. Here on 31 May, Fözö was severely injured in a landing accident when his Bf 109 F-2 (factory number 8086) flipped over on the muddy landing strip. In consequence, Fözö had to be replaced by Hauptmann Heinrich Krafft as commander of I. Gruppe.

On recovery Fözö was appointed Gruppenkommandeur of I. Gruppe of Jagdgeschwader 108, a training unit, in June 1944. He led the unit until 29 January 1945. On 30 November 1944, Fözö attended a meeting held by the Inspector of Day Fighters, Oberst Günther Lützow at the Altemburg Airfield. Lützow had invited the commanding officers of various Luftwaffe training units to discuss the status of fighter pilot training. Among others, the meeting was attended by Karl-Heinz Schnell, Gerhard Koall, Reinhard Seiler, Rolf Hermichen and Hans von Hahn.

== Later life ==
Fözo committed suicide on 4 March 1979 at the age of 66 in Vienna, Austria.

== Summary of career ==
=== Aerial victory claims ===
According to Obermaier, Fözö was credited with 27 aerial victories, three of which during the Spanish Civil War and 15 over the Western Allies and nine on the Eastern Front. He flew 517 combat missions, including 147 in Spain. Mathews and Foreman, authors of Luftwaffe Aces — Biographies and Victory Claims, researched the German Federal Archives and found documentation for 23 aerial victory claims, plus three further unconfirmed claims. This number includes three claims during the Spanish Civil War, 11 on the Western Front, and nine on the Eastern Front.

Chronicle of aerial victories
This and the ? (question mark) indicates information discrepancies listed by Prien, Stemmer, Rodeike, Bock, Forsyth, Mathews and Foreman.
Claim	Date	Time	Type	Location	Claim	Date	Time	Type	Location
Spanish Civil War
– 3. Staffel of Jagdgruppe 88 – Spanish Civil War — September 1938 – January 1939
1	18 September 1938	—	I-16		3	17 January 1939	—	I-16	
2	31 October 1938	—	I-16						
World War II
– 4. Staffel of Jagdgeschwader 51 – "Phoney War" — 1 November 1939 – 9 May 1940
1? (Note: This claim is not listed by Mathews and Foreman.)	16 April 1940	15:55	tethered balloon	west of Breisach					
– 4. Staffel of Jagdgeschwader 51 – At the Channel and over England — 26 June 1940 – 20 February 1941
2	8 July 1940	16:45	Spitfire	north of Dover	9? (Note: According to Mathews and Foreman, this claim is unconfirmed.)	16 August 1940	—	Hurricane	east of Dover
3	13 July 1940	19:26	Hurricane	10 km (6.2 mi) west of Cap Gris-Nez	10	16 August 1940	18:05	Spitfire	east of Dover
4	13 July 1940	19:30	Hurricane	10 km (6.2 mi) west of Cap Gris-Nez	11?	18 August 1940	—	Hurricane	east of Ramsgate
5	31 July 1940	16:55	Spitfire	northwest of Dover	12	24 August 1940	09:35	Hurricane	northwest of Dover
6	8 August 1940	12:35	Spitfire	southeast of Folkestone	13	26 August 1940	13:15	Spitfire	Canterbury
7	15 August 1940	16:17	Hurricane	east of Burnham-on-Crouch	14	15 October 1940	09:32	Hurricane	London
8?	16 August 1940	—	Hurricane	east of Dover					
– Stab II. Gruppe of Jagdgeschwader 51 – At the Channel and over England — 20 February – 7 June 1941
15	9 April 1941	12:00	Spitfire	3 km (1.9 mi) north of Mardyck					
– Stab II. Gruppe of Jagdgeschwader 51 – Operation Barbarossa — 22 June – 11 July 1941
16	29 June 1941	19:25	I-16		21	1 July 1941	14:30	I-16	
17	30 June 1941	10:35	R-10 (Seversky)		22	2 July 1941	14:32	SB-2	
18	30 June 1941	10:40	DB-3		23	9 July 1941	15:15	I-16	airfield Subowa
19	30 June 1941	16:45	DB-3		24	11 July 1941	17:05	DB-3	
20	30 June 1941	17:30	TB-6						

=== Awards ===
- Spanish Cross in Gold with Swords (14 April 1939)
- Iron Cross (1939) 2nd and 1st Class
- Knight's Cross of the Iron Cross on 2 July 1941 as Hauptmann and Gruppenkommandeur of the II./Jagdgeschwader 51

== Publications ==
- Freie Jagd von Madrid bis Moskau - Ein Fliegerleben mit Mölders [Free Hunting from Madrid to Moscow - A Pilot's Life with Mölders] (in German). Berlin, Germany: Alfred Becker. 1943. OCLC 9361944.

== Notes ==
Military offices
Preceded by Hauptmann Günther Matthes	Commander of II. Jagdgeschwader 51; 21 February 1941 – September 1941	Succeeded by Hauptmann Hartmann Grasser
Preceded by Hauptmann Wilhelm Hachfeld	Commander of I. Jagdgeschwader 51; 3 May 1942 – 1 June 1942	Succeeded by Hauptmann Heinrich Krafft
