= Jagdgeschwader 71 =

Jagdgeschwader 71 may refer to:

- Taktisches Luftwaffengeschwader 71 "Richthofen" of the German Air Force or
- Jagdgeschwader 71 (World War II) of Nazi Germany's Luftwaffe
