= Richard Leppla =

German World War II flying ace

- Leppla as a Hauptmann
- Born: 9 June 1914; Matzenbach, district of Kusel in Rhineland-Palatinate
- Died: 4 August 1988 (aged 74); Matzenbach, West Germany
- Military career
- Allegiance: Nazi Germany; West Germany
- Branch: Luftwaffe; German Air Force
- Rank: Oberst (Colonel)
- Unit: JG 51, JG 105, JG 6
- Commands: III./JG 51, JG 6
- Conflicts: World War II
- Awards: Knight's Cross of the Iron Cross

Richard Leppla (9 June 1914 – 4 August 1988) was a German fighter ace in the Luftwaffe during World War II. He was a recipient of the Knight's Cross of the Iron Cross. Leppla claimed 68 aerial victories claimed in over 500 combat missions. The Knight's Cross of the Iron Cross, and its variants were the highest awards in the military and paramilitary forces of Nazi Germany during World War II.

== Career ==
Leppla was born on 9 June 1914 in Matzenbach, joining the army as a cadet in 1934, he transferred to the Luftwaffe in 1935 and was an Oberleutnant with 3 Staffel, Jagdgeschwader 51 (JG 51—51st fighter wing) when the war started.

On 15 March 1940, Leppla was appointed Staffelkapitän (squadron leader) of 3. Staffel of JG 51, replacing Hauptmann Erich Gerlitz who was transferred. He claimed his first aerial victory on 10 May, a Dutch Fokker D.XXI. By July he had claimed five victories, and during the Battle of Britain.

On 10 November 1940, Leppla was appointed Gruppenkommandeur (group commander) of III. Gruppe of JG 51. He succeeded Hauptmann Walter Oesau who was transferred. In consequence, command of 3. Staffel was past on to Oberleutnant Heinrich Krafft.

On 26 May 1941, III. Gruppe was withdrawn from the English Channel and relocated to Düsseldorf Airfield for a brief period of rest and replenishment. On 15 June, the Gruppe was ordered to Halászi, at the time in the General Government.

=== Operation Barbarossa ===
On 22 June, German forces launched Operation Barbarossa, the German invasion of the Soviet Union. JG 51 was subordinated to II. Fliegerkorps (2nd Air Corps), which as part of Luftflotte 2 (Air Fleet 2). JG 51 area of operation during Operation Barbarossa was over the right flank of Army Group Center in the combat area of the 2nd Panzer Group as well as the 4th Army. That day, III. Gruppe intercepted a large formation of Soviet bombers, claiming 19 aerial victories and further destroying 23 aircraft on the ground, including three aerial victories by Leppla.

On 12 July, he was credited with claiming JG 51s 1,200 aerial victory. On 27 July 1941, Leppla was awarded the Knight's Cross of the Iron Cross (Ritterkreuz des Eisernen Kreuzes) for 27 aerial victories claimed. He received this distinction the same day and fellow JG 51 pilot Oberleutnant Hans Kolbow was awarded a posthumous Knight's Cross.

His 40th victim fell 10 October 1941 and his 50th came on 9 February 1942. On 4 January 1942, Leppla was wounded in a takeoff accident at Yukhnov when his Messerschmitt Bf 109 F-2 (Werknummer 8185—factory number) collided with a Junkers Ju 52 transport aircraft. On 2 August, Leppla was wounded in aerial combat resulting in a forced landing of his Bf 109 F-2 (Werknummer 8144) in a location 10 kilometers (6.2 miles) west of Teschertolino. His injuries were so severe that he was temporarily replaced by Oberleutnant Herbert Wehnelt before Hauptmann Karl-Heinz Schnell officially took command of the Gruppe on 24 September.

After a period of hospitalization in December 1942 Leppla was assigned to command Jagdfliegerschule 5 (later renamed JG 105), a position he held until August 1943.

In April 1945 Leppla was then appointed Geschwaderkommodore of Jagdgeschwader 6. When the war ended, Leppla was interned by Soviet forces, remaining in captivity until 1950.

He then served in the West German Air Force, reaching the rank of Oberst before retiring from active service in 1972.

Leppla flew over 500 combat missions and claimed 68 victories (13 on the western front and the 55 on the Russian front).

== Later life ==
Following World War II, Leppla reentered military service in the West German Air Force, at the time referred to as the Bundesluftwaffe. He retired in September 1972 holding the rank of Oberst (colonel) and died on 4 August 1988 at the age of 74 in Matzenbach, West Germany.

== Summary of career ==
=== Aerial victory claims ===
According to US historian David T. Zabecki, Leppla was credited with 68 aerial victories. Spick also lists him with 68 aerial victories claimed in over 500 combat missions, and a mission-to-claim ratio of 7.35. Mathews and Foreman, authors of Luftwaffe Aces — Biographies and Victory Claims, researched the German Federal Archives and found records for 59 aerial victory claims, plus five further unconfirmed claims. This figure of confirmed claims includes seven aerial victories on the Western Front and 52 on the Eastern Front.

Victory claims were logged to a map-reference (PQ = Planquadrat), for example "PQ 47581". The Luftwaffe grid map (Jägermeldenetz) covered all of Europe, western Russia and North Africa and was composed of rectangles measuring 15 minutes of latitude by 30 minutes of longitude, an area of about 360 square miles (930 km^{2}). These sectors were then subdivided into 36 smaller units to give a location area 3 km × 4 km (1.9 mi × 2.5 mi) in size.

Chronicle of aerial victories
This and the ? (question mark) indicates information discrepancies listed by Prien, Stemmer, Rodeike, Balke, Bock, Mathews and Foreman.
Claim	Date	Time	Type	Location	Claim	Date	Time	Type	Location
– 3. Staffel of Jagdgeschwader 51 – Battle of France — 10 May – 25 June 1940
1	10 May 1940	06:30	Fokker D.XXI	Zevenbergen	3? (Note: According to Mathews and Foreman this claim is unconfirmed.)	21 May 1940	—	M.S.406	Abbeville
2	21 May 1940	08:05	M.S.406	Abbeville	4?	22 May 1940	—	Hurricane	Abbeville
– 3. Staffel of Jagdgeschwader 51 – At the Channel and over England — 26 June – 9 November 1940
5?	28 July 1940	15:30	Spitfire	Dover	8	31 August 1940	14:08	Hurricane	
6?	24 August 1940	—	Spitfire		9	4 September 1940	10:30	Spitfire	
7	26 August 1940	12:57	Spitfire		10	4 September 1940	13:20	Spitfire	
According to Prien, Stemmer, Rodeike and Bock, Leplpa claimed his eleventh and undocumented aerial victory in September 1940.
12?	4 October 1940	—	Hurricane	west of Dover					
– Stab III. Gruppe of Jagdgeschwader 51 – At the Channel and over England — 10 November 1940 – 26 May 1941
13	1 December 1940	11:45	Hurricane						
– Stab III. Gruppe of Jagdgeschwader 51 – Operation Barbarossa — 22 June – 5 December 1941
14	22 June 1941	07:20	I-153		31	6 August 1941	09:50	Pe-2	
15	22 June 1941	12:20	SB-2		32	8 August 1941	15:25	DB-3	3 km (1.9 mi) west of Yelnya
16	22 June 1941	12:25	SB-2		33	8 August 1941	15:26	DB-3	
17	29 June 1941	18:30	SB-2		34	18 August 1941	08:35	DB-3	
18	30 June 1941	11:50	V-11		35	18 August 1941	08:38	DB-3	
19	30 June 1941	16:25	DB-3	3 km (1.9 mi) west of Bobruysk	36	9 September 1941	16:13	Pe-2	
20	30 June 1941	16:32	DB-3	15 km (9.3 mi) northeast of Bobruysk	37	25 September 1941	06:55	I-18	
21	8 July 1941	19:25	DB-3		38	4 October 1941	—	Pe-2	
22	11 July 1941	16:10	DB-3		39	6 October 1941	—	Pe-2	
23	12 July 1941	16:10	Pe-2		40	10 October 1941	08:00	Pe-2	
24	12 July 1941	19:25	V-11		41	23 October 1941	16:55	I-61	
25	12 July 1941	19:30	V-11		42	25 October 1941	08:35	DB-3	
26	16 July 1941	18:25	V-11		43	25 October 1941	12:12	I-61	
27	26 July 1941	11:35	DB-3		44	29 October 1941	15:50	DB-3	20 km (12 mi) west of Podolsk
28	26 July 1941	18:05	DB-3		45	6 November 1941	—	unknown	
29	2 August 1941	16:24	I-18		46	28 November 1941	11:00	R-10	
30	2 August 1941	16:25	Pe-2						
– Stab III. Gruppe of Jagdgeschwader 51 "Mölders" – Eastern Front — 5 December 1941 – 30 April 1942
47	15 December 1941	10:10	I-61	5 km (3.1 mi) northwest of Kubinka	54	5 March 1942	14:40	unknown	
48	4 February 1942	13:15	U-2	Ssawaje	55	8 March 1942	10:00	unknown	
49	10 February 1942	13:15	I-61	Mosskressenskaja	56	12 March 1942	09:48	unknown	
50	18 February 1942	12:10	unknown		57	8 March 1942	17:45	unknown	
51	18 February 1942	15:35	unknown		58	1 April 1942	12:50	unknown	
52	18 February 1942	16:10	unknown		59	5 April 1942	13:55	unknown	
53	3 March 1942	09:40	I-26	northwest of Rzhev					
– Stab III. Gruppe of Jagdgeschwader 51 "Mölders" – Eastern Front — 1 May – 2 August 1943
60	10 May 1942	10:40	unknown		65	13 July 1942	15:50	unknown	
61	10 May 1942	12:30	Il-2		66	13 July 1942	16:05	unknown	
62	2 July 1942	19:30	unknown		67	1 August 1942	11:45	Il-2	PQ 47581
63	9 July 1942	11:25	unknown		68	1 August 1942	17:30	Il-2	PQ 47813
64	10 July 1942	10:32	unknown						

=== Awards ===
- Iron Cross (1939) 2nd and 1st Class
- German Cross in Gold on 9 December 1941 as Hauptmann in the III./Jagdgeschwader 51
- Knight's Cross of the Iron Cross on 27 July 1941 as Hauptmann and Gruppenkommandeur of the III./Jagdgeschwader 51

== Notes ==
Military offices
Preceded by Major Gerhard Schöpfel	Commander of Jagdgeschwader 6 Horst Wessel; 17 April 1945 – 8 May 1945	Succeeded by disbanded
