= Heinrich Krafft =

German fighter pilot (1914–1942)

- Krafft as a Hauptmann
- Born: 13 August 1914; Bilin, Bohemia
- Died: 14 December 1942 (aged 28); Belyi, Russia
- Military career
- Allegiance: Nazi Germany
- Branch: Army (1935–36); Luftwaffe (1936–42)
- Service years: 1935–1942
- Rank: Hauptmann (captain)
- Nickname: "Gaudi"
- Unit: JG 51
- Commands: I./JG 51
- Conflicts: World War II: Battle of the Netherlands; Battle of France; Operation Barbarossa
- Awards: Knight's Cross of the Iron Cross

Heinrich "Gaudi" Krafft (13 August 1914 – 14 December 1942) was a Luftwaffe ace and recipient of the Knight's Cross of the Iron Cross during World War II. The Knight's Cross of the Iron Cross, and its variants were the highest awards in the military and paramilitary forces of Nazi Germany during World War II. During his career he was credited with 78 aerial victories, 4 over the Western Front and 74 over the Eastern Front.

== Career ==
On 10 November 1940, Krafft was appointed Staffelkapitän (squadron leader) of 3. Staffel of JG 51, replacing Oberleutnant Richard Leppla who was transferred.

On 18 March, Krafft and fellow JG 51 pilot Leutnant Hans Strelow were awarded the Knight's Cross of the Iron Cross (Ritterkreuz des Eisernen Kreuzes) for 46 and 52 aerial victories claimed respectively.

On 1 June 1942, Krafft succeeded Hauptmann Josef Fözö as Gruppenkommandeur (group commander) of I. Gruppe of JG 51. On 10 August, I. Gruppe of JG 51 was withdrawn from the Eastern Front and sent to Jesau, near present-day Bagrationovsk, to Heiligenbeil, present-day Mamonovo, to be reequipped with the Focke-Wulf Fw 190 A. The pilots were sent to Ergänzungs-Jagdgruppe West based at Cazaux, France for conversion training. Conversion completed, the Gruppe then relocated to Lyuban on 10 September. Here they came under control of Army Group North and fought in the area south of Lake Ladoga.

On 14 December 1942, Krafft's Fw 190 A-3 (Werknummer 0539—factory number) was hit by anti-aircraft artillery resulting in a forced landing near Torbin, located approximately 10 kilometers (6.2 miles) south of Bely behind enemy lines. Krafft was captured by Soviet forces and beaten to death. His body was later recovered by German forces, indicating severe blows to the head. Command of I. Gruppe of JG 51 was temporarily passed to Oberleutnant Rudolf Busch before Hauptmann Erich Leie was given command on 6 January 1943.

== Summary of career ==
=== Aerial victory claims ===
According to US historian David T. Zabecki, Krafft was credited with 78 aerial victories.

Victory claims were logged to a map-reference (PQ = Planquadrat), for example "PQ 46131". The Luftwaffe grid map (Jägermeldenetz) covered all of Europe, western Russia and North Africa and was composed of rectangles measuring 15 minutes of latitude by 30 minutes of longitude, an area of about 360 square miles (930 km^{2}). These sectors were then subdivided into 36 smaller units to give a location area 3 km × 4 km (1.9 mi × 2.5 mi) in size.

Chronicle of aerial victories
This and the ♠ (Ace of spades) indicates those aerial victories which made Krafft an "ace-in-a-day", a term which designates a fighter pilot who has shot down five or more airplanes in a single day. This and the # (hash mark) indicates those aerial victories listed by Prien, Stemmer, Rodeike and Bock without an explicit sequence number.
| Claim | Date | Time | Type | Location | Claim | Date | Time | Type | Location |
– 3. Staffel of Jagdgeschwader 51 – Battle of France — 10 May – 25 June 1940
| 1 | 11 May 1940 | 18:08 | Hurricane | Rotterdam | 3 | 21 May 1940 | 08:10 | M.S.406 | Abbeville |
| 2 | 11 May 1940 | 18:16 | Hurricane | Rotterdam | 4 | 22 May 1940 | — | Curtiss | Abbeville |
– 3. Staffel of Jagdgeschwader 51 – Operation Barbarossa — 22 June – 5 December 1941
| 5 | 22 June 1941 | 07:02 | I-153 | | 18 | 31 August 1941 | 10:31 | SB-3 | |
| 6 | 22 June 1941 | 09:55 | SB-2 | | 19 | 31 August 1941 | 10:36 | SB-3 | |
| 7 | 22 June 1941 | 10:02 | SB-2 | | 20 | 8 September 1941 | 09:30 | Pe-2 | |
| 8 | 22 June 1941 | 17:45 | DB-3 | | 21 | 4 October 1941 | 08:20 | I-16 | |
| 9 | 25 June 1941 | 14:00 | SB-2 | | 22 | 5 October 1941 | 06:50 | I-61 | 20 km (12 mi) southwest of Dubrowka |
| 10 | 29 June 1941 | 12:40 | I-16 | | 23 | 8 October 1941 | 14:15 | DB-3 | |
| 11 | 30 June 1941 | 13:05 | SB-3 | | 24 | 10 October 1941 | 11:00 | I-61 | |
| 12 | 30 June 1941 | 18:50 | DB-3 | | 25 | 11 October 1941 | 14:35 | I-61 | |
| 13 | 13 July 1941 | 14:55 | SB-3 | | 26 | 22 October 1941 | 11:35 | I-61 | |
| 14 | 24 July 1941 | 11:30 | Seversky | | 27 | 24 October 1941 | 15:45 | I-61 | |
| 15 | 26 August 1941 | 17:14 | V-11 | | 28 | 25 October 1941 | 08:50 | I-61 | |
| 16 | 26 August 1941 | 17:19 | V-11 | 20 km (12 mi) southeast of Dobruschij | 29 | 1 December 1941 | 13:13 | I-61 | |
| 17 | 31 August 1941 | 10:25 | SB-3 | | 30 | 5 December 1941 | 14:30 | I-61 | |
– 3. Staffel of Jagdgeschwader 51 "Mölders" – Eastern Front — 6 December 1941 – 30 April 1942
| 31 | 6 December 1941 | 11:32 | I-61 | | # | 10 February 1942 | 15:14 | I-61 | |
| 32 | 6 December 1941 | 14:38 | BSch (Il-2) (Note: The aircraft type "BSchl" refers to an unspecified ground-attack aircraft, most likely an Ilyushin Il-2.) | | # | 10 February 1942 | 15:17 | I-61 | |
| 33 | 6 December 1941 | 14:40 | BSch (Il-2) | | # | 16 February 1942 | 15:25 | I-61 | |
| 34 | 12 December 1941 | 12:19 | I-61 | | # | 17 February 1942 | 16:20 | I-61 | |
| 35 | 18 December 1941 | 11:00 | I-61 | | # | 18 February 1942 | 15:30 | I-61 | |
| 36 | 18 December 1941 | 11:07 | BSch (Il-2) | | # | 20 February 1942 | 10:10 | U-2 | |
| # | 25 January 1942 | 15:03 | I-61 | | # | 30 April 1942 | 16:33 | Il-2 | |
| # | 26 January 1942 | 15:20 | I-61 | | | | | | |
– Stab I. Gruppe of Jagdgeschwader 51 "Mölders" – Eastern Front — May – 14 December 1942
| # | 22 May 1942 | 16:13 | unknown | | # | 6 July 1942 | 10:51 | unknown | |
| # | 3 June 1942 | 19:20 | unknown | | # | 6 July 1942 | 15:20 | unknown | |
| # | 11 June 1942 | 07:56 | unknown | | # | 6 July 1942 | 15:20 | unknown | |
| # | 11 June 1942 | 07:58 | unknown | | # | 7 July 1942 | 09:55 | unknown | |
| # | 26 June 1942 | 14:58 | unknown | | # | 7 July 1942 | 19:42 | unknown | |
| # | 26 June 1942 | 14:59 | unknown | | # | 8 July 1942 | 15:43 | unknown | |
| # | 27 June 1942 | 09:41 | unknown | | | | | | |
According to Prien, Stemmer, Rodeike and Bock, Krafft claimed two undocumented aerial victories before August 1942.
| 61 | 7 August 1942 | 09:55 | Il-2 | | 70 | 30 November 1942 | 12:07 | Il-2 | PQ 46131 |
| 62 | 29 September 1942 | — | I-16 | | 71♠ | 4 December 1942 | 09:25 | Il-2 | vicinity of Ssolowino |
| 63 | 30 September 1942 | — | I-16 | | 72♠ | 4 December 1942 | 09:30 | Il-2 | vicinity of Bortniki |
| 64 | 1 October 1942 | — | Hurricane | | 73♠ | 4 December 1942 | 12:15 | Il-2 | south of Dubawo |
| 65 | 23 October 1942 | 15:22 | LaGG-3 | Sapadnaja Dwina | 74♠ | 4 December 1942 | 12:17 | Il-2 | Dubawo |
| 66 | 11 November 1942 | 14:16 | LaGG-3 | PQ 27814 | 75♠ | 4 December 1942 | 14:57 | Il-2 | vicinity of Swrtuiki |
| 67 | 26 November 1942 | 12:24 | Il-2 | PQ 26422, west of Ramuschewo | 76 | 8 December 1942 | 13:35 | La-5 | PQ 26281 |
| 68 | 26 November 1942 | 12:26 | Il-2 | PQ 26384, west of Ramuschewo | 77 | 10 December 1942 | 09:35 | LaGG-3 | vicinity of Ssawoschny |
| 69 | 26 November 1942 | 12:28 | Il-2 | PQ 26284, west of Ramuschewo | 78 | 10 December 1942 | 12:28 | Pe-2 | vicinity of Meinzorow |

=== Awards ===
- Iron Cross (1939) 2nd and 1st Class
- German Cross in Gold on 25 January 1942 as Oberleutnant in the I./Jagdgeschwader 51 (Note: According to Obermaier on 25 January 1942.)
- Knight's Cross of the Iron Cross on 18 March 1942 as Oberleutnant of the Reserves and Staffelkapitän of the 3./Jagdgeschwader 51 "Mölders" (Note: According to Scherzer as Oberleutnant.)

== Notes ==
Military offices
| Preceded by Hauptmann Josef Fözö | Gruppenkommandeur of I./JG 51; 1 June 1942 – 14 December 1942 | Succeeded by Hauptmann Rudolf Busch |
