= Jagdgeschwader 72 =

Former Luftwaffe fighter wing

- Active: 1 March 1961 – 31 January 2002
- Country: Germany
- Branch: German Air Force
- Type: Fighter Wing
- Garrison/HQ: Rheine-Hopsten Air Base
- Nickname: Westfalen
- Equipment: McDonnell Douglas F-4 Phantom II

Jagdgeschwader 72 "Westfalen" (Fighter Wing 72 "Westphalia") is a former fighter wing of the Luftwaffe and was stationed at Hopsten Air Base. The unit was originally established as Jagdbombergeschwader 36 (Fighter-Bomber Wing 36) and converted into a wing squadron in 1991. After being decommissioned on January 31, 2002, the wing's 2nd Squadron was maintained as the F-4F Flight Training Center until mid-2006.

== History ==
During the Second World War, there was a unit of the Nazi German Luftwaffe Jagdgeschwader 72.

=== Jagdbombergeschwader 36 ===
The West German wing was established on 1 March 1961 by Major Wilhelm Meyn at Nörvenich Air Base, the location of Jagdbombergeschwder 31 (Fighter Bomber Wing 31). For this purpose, about 50 Republic F-84F Thunderstreak aircraft were spun off from the 31st Wing. Just three days later, on 4 March 1961, an advance cadre moved to the new air base in Hopsten to make preparations for the relocation of the aircraft. During these preparations, the first flights of the still unofficial "Westphalia Wing" took place from Nörvenich, before it moved to the NATO training area in Decimomannu, Sardinia from April to 31 August. On their return, the aircraft landed at their new base in Hopsten and were placed under NATO control on 1 September 1961. The official commissioning of the wing's first squadron took place on 12 December 1961 by the then Inspector of the Air Force, Lieutenant General Josef Kammhuber.

On January 19, 1962, the Federal Ministry of Defense gave the order to set up a second squadron. Its primary task was to prepare pilots who had trained in the United States for European conditions. In addition to its Thunderstreaks, the squadron was also assigned six Lockheed T-33 T-Birds as training aircraft and two Piaggio P.149s as transport aircraft. On 13 March, the squadron's coat of arms was approved: the leaping Westphalian horse on a blue and red background, with the blue symbolizing the sky and the red the earth of Westphalia.

Starting on 2 February 1965, the wing gradually converted to the Lockheed F-104 Starfighter. The first aircraft was transferred from Manching by the then commander, Lieutenant Colonel Lothar Kmitta. It took almost two years until all 52 aircraft were stationed in Hopsten. The old F-84F Thunderstreaks, on which the squadron had completed around 50,000 flight hours and which cost the lives of eight pilots, were sold to Turkey. After the conversion was complete, the wing was again under NATO command from December 1967. The Starfighters and NATO's new Flexible Response doctrine led to a change in mission. In the event of an attack by the Warsaw Pact, the Starfighters were to be equipped with nuclear weapons. Accordingly, a nuclear alert squadron(Quick Reaction Alert) was set up, with two aircraft waiting ready for takeoff at all times. They were stationed in a secure area of the air base, access to which was strictly controlled due to the nuclear weapons stored there and only a few people were allowed to enter. From 1972 onwards, NATO's threat assessment changed. As a result, not every squadron equipped with Starfighters was required to be capable of using nuclear weapons. As a result, only Jagdbombergeschwader 36 was equipped with conventional weapons.

Due to repair work at the air base, the squadron had to relocate to Beja Airbase, Portugal for three months in 1971. A total of 23 aircraft and some ground equipment made this journey. It arrived back in Hopsten in time for its tenth anniversary. The following year, the Piaggio P149s were replaced by Dornier Do 28 Skyservants, which remained in use until 1992. After over 100,000 flight hours and eleven crashed Starfighters, the conversion to the McDonnell F-4 Phantom II began on February 4, 1975, when the wing commander, Colonel Winfried Schwenke, later head of the Military Counterintelligence Service, flew the first aircraft to Hopsten. The conversion was to take until the end of July 1976. Although the Phantom was actually intended for air defense and was not capable of carrying nuclear weapons, the Ministry of Defense decided to equip the fighter-bomber wing in Hopsten with them. This was due on the one hand to its former role in the Flexible Response doctrine and on the other hand to delays in the development and production of the Panavia Tornado. This choice of the multi-role Phantom fighter aircraft also led to an expansion of the squadron's range of tasks, after which air defense became a secondary mission. The Quick Reaction Alert Interceptor required for this was kept on standby in the former alert area of the Starfighters at the air base. The wing was responsible for this task in particular when Jagdgeschwader 71 "Richthofen" was not ready for action.

From July 21 to September 26, 1980, the wing was the first German wing to deploy to the CFB Goose Bay, Labrador for low-level flight training. Due to its pioneering work and the positive experiences gained from it, every unit was moved there for training once a year until 2006.

In order to better standardize the training of the crews, plans for centralization were made. For this purpose, the F-4F Central Training Facility was set up at the wing on 1 February 1981. Its task was the Europeanization of the Phantom crews trained in the United States, the training of flight instructors and, in individual cases, the retraining of pilots who switched from other weapon systems to the Phantom. The commissioning of the wing's 3rd squadron took place on 1 January 1984. (Note: A short time later, in May 1984, the Ministry of Defense officially awarded the squadron the traditional name "Westfalen".)

=== Jagdgeschwader 72 ===
Due to the fall of the Berlin Wall and German reunification, the Air Force was faced with new tasks. Air defense over the former East Germany had to be ensured and a wing had to be stationed in eastern Germany. Following a decision by the Air Force leadership, Jagdbombergeschwader 36 was converted to become Jagdgeschwader 72. Together with Jagdgeschwader 73, which had also been converted, two aircraft were assigned alternately as an alert squadron to Faßberg Air Base. Due to the unfavorable infrastructure, these alert missions were flown from Hopsten again after December 1990. After the complete conversion, the wing was officially renamed Jagdgeschwader 72 "Westfalia" on January 1, 1991.

On 24 May 1991, it was initially decided to relocate the fighter squadron to Laage in Mecklenburg-Western Pomerania and to combine it with the MiG-29s taken over from the East German Army to form a new wing. In April 1993, the planned relocation was stopped due to political and military changes and the wing remained in Hopsten. On 22 April 1993, a flight accident occurred at Goose Bay airfield in Canada in which a crew of the wing was killed. In February 1995, the third squadron of the wing and the F-4F Central Training Facility were disbanded and merged with the second squadron.

In the following years, the wing took part in several maneuvers. It was given a special mission in January 1997, when it transferred 24 F-4F Phantoms to Holloman Air Force Base in the United States, replacing the ten F-4E models stationed there that had reached the end of their service life. The remaining aircraft of this model were then brought together in Hopsten so that the pilots returning from the USA would find identical machines when they moved to Europe.

The announcement of the new Air Force Structure 5 in 2001 sealed the end of the 72nd. The Phantoms that had not been upgraded were to be scrapped, and most of those were at Hopsten. The last alert mission of the wing took place on January 7, 2002. The first squadron was decommissioned on January 18, 2002. The second squadron followed on January 31, 2002.

=== F-4F Flight Training Center ===
At the same time the it was decommissioned, the former 2nd Squadron was put into service on February 1, 2002 as the F-4F Flight Training Center (Fliegerlehrzentrum-F-4F). At the same time, the decommissioning of the non-combat upgraded F-4models began. 21 aircraft were phased out by the end of 2004. Still usable parts were removed and the rest of the aircraft were scrapped. 18 aircraft remained, which were still used for Europeanization. With the introduction of the Eurofighter, the need for training crews for the Phantom ended. The training capacity in the USA was reduced to zero in line with the planning of the influx of Eurofighters. After the end of the last course at Holloman, the American training squadron was disbanded on December 20, 2004. [ 2 ] After the Europeanization of the last students from Holloman, there was no longer any need for the flight training center.

On December 15, 2005, the last Phantom in regular flight operations landed in Hopsten. The transfer of the remaining aircraft to Jagdgeschwader 71 "Richthofen" at Wittmundhafen Air Base then began. To see the squadron off, guest aircraft from other Luftwaffe wings arrived. The last to take off for Wittmund on December 20, 2005 was a completely black Phantom with the serial 37+11, with an angular, painted Westphalian horse on both sides of the fuselage and the splintered coat of arms of the Westphalian Squadron on the underside . The aircraft stood in front of the building of the First Fighter Squadron of Jagdgeschwader 71 at Wittmund Air Base until the beginning of 2012, but has since been scrapped.
