= Wilhelm Mink (pilot) =

German fighter ace and Knight's Cross recipient

- Born: 29 April 1912; Cologne
- Died: 12 March 1945 (aged 32); Hadersleben, Denmark
- Military career
- Allegiance: Nazi Germany
- Branch: Luftwaffe
- Service years: 1940–1945
- Rank: Oberfeldwebel
- Units: JG 51; EJG 1
- Conflicts: World War II: Battle of France; Battle of Britain; Operation Barbarossa; Italian Campaign; Defense of the Reich
- Awards: Knight's Cross of the Iron Cross

Wilhelm Mink (29 April 1912 – 12 March 1945) was a Luftwaffe ace and recipient of the Knight's Cross of the Iron Cross during World War II. The Knight's Cross of the Iron Cross, and its variants were the highest awards in the military and paramilitary forces of Nazi Germany during World War II.

== Career ==
Born in Köln, Wilhelm Mink joined 5 Staffel, Jagdgeschwader 51 (JG 51) in early 1940, and participated in the French campaign of May and June 1940.

During the Battle of Britain Mink claimed no victories but was shot down by Royal Air Force (RAF) fighters over the English Channel, and was rescued by German air sea rescue (Seenotdienst). His first victory, a Blenheim, was confirmed on 29 April 1941, followed by a Hurricane on 21 May 1941.

In June 1941, JG 51 was transferred to the east for the invasion of the USSR. Mink significantly increased his tally, totalling 31 confirmed victories by the end of 1941.

Fighting in the Battles of Rzhev against the Kalinin Front in early 1942, II. and IV. Gruppen of JG 51 had become the most successful units of VIII. Fliegerkorps (8th Air Corps). By end-February, three pilots of II. Gruppe had claimed 40 aerial victories, these were Leutnant Hans Strelow, Oberfeldwebel Otto Tange and Mink. On 19 March 1942, Mink was awarded the Knight's Cross of the Iron Cross (Ritterkreuz des Eisernen Kreuzes) for 40 aerial victories claimed. He reached his 50th claim in July 1942. In September 1942 Mink was transferred to the Ergänzungsgruppe Ost as an instructor.

Injured in a bombing raid, Mink returned to action in November 1943, with Ergänzungsgruppe Staffel Süd fighting in Italy. After a few victories on this front, he was wounded in combat with a B-26 Marauder near Rome on 3 February 1944, baling out of his Bf 109 G-6.

Mink remained with Erg. Gr. Süd during early 1944, and transferred to Erg. Gr. Nord in September 1944. This unit was later redesignated I./EJG 1 (Ergänzungsjagdgeschwader 1).

On 12 March 1945, Mink was killed in action when his Bf 109 G-14 was shot down by Allied fighters near Hadersleben, Denmark.

During his career he was credited with 72 aerial victories, 8 on the Western Front and 64 on the Eastern Front.

Minks headless body and remains of his fighter was discovered near Haderslev in 1985 during expansion of the highway through southern Denmark. It's suspected that the head was removed by the Germans and buried near Flensburg with military honours. The headless remains was buried at Assistent kirkegården Haderslev, Denmark, in a dedicated area for fallen German soldiers.

== Summary of career ==
=== Aerial victory claims ===
According to US historian David T. Zabecki, Mink was credited with 72 aerial victories. Heaton, Lewis, Olds and Schulze also list him with 72 aerial victories. Spick states that of his 72 aerial victories, 70 aerial victories were claimed on the Eastern Front and further two victories were claimed over the Western Allies. Mathews and Foreman, authors of Luftwaffe Aces — Biographies and Victory Claims, researched the German Federal Archives and found records for 68 aerial victory claims. This figure includes 64 aerial victories on the Eastern Front and four over the Western Allies, including two four-engined heavy bombers.

=== Awards ===
- Flugzeugführerabzeichen
- Front Flying Clasp of the Luftwaffe
- Wound Badge (1939) in Black or Silver
- Iron Cross (1939) 2nd and 1st Class
- Honor Goblet of the Luftwaffe on 30 September 1941 as Feldwebel in a Jagdgeschwader
- German Cross in Gold on 4 February 1942 as Feldwebel in the 5./Jagdgeschwader 51
- Knight's Cross of the Iron Cross on 19 March 1942 as Oberfeldwebel and pilot in the 5./Jagdgeschwader 51 "Mölders"
