= Rheine-Hopsten Air Base =

Former German Air Force military airfield

Rheine-Hopsten Air Base Advanced Landing Ground (ALG) B-112

Site information
- Type: Military Airfield
- Controlled by: Bundeswehr (Air Force)

Location
- Coordinates: 52°20′19″N 007°32′29″E

Site history
- In use: 1940-2005
- Battles/wars: World War II

Garrison information
- Occupants: Luftwaffe (National Socialist), 1940-1945; Royal Air Force, 1945; German Air Force (FRG), 1959-2005

Airfield information
- IATA: ZPQ; ICAO: ETNP

Summary
- Elevation AMSL: 128 ft (39 m)
- Coordinates: 52°20′19″N 007°32′29″E

Map
- Location of Rheine-Hopsten Air Base

Runways
Direction	Length		Surface
Direction	ft	m	Surface
01/19	9,842	3,000	Concrete

Rheine-Hopsten Air Base is a former German Air Force military airfield, located 9.3 km north east of Rheine in Westphalia, Germany. The runway was closed in 2005 with the retirement of the F-4F Phantom II aircraft.

== History ==
In 1939 works to build an airfield for the Luftwaffe began. These works were completed in 1940.

=== World War II ===
Hopsten airfield played only a secondary role as an operational base for the Luftwaffe in the opening stages of World War II. In the years between 1939 and 1944, the airfield was used only for short periods by different day and night fighter units as well as various bomber wings.

As part of the "Defense of the Reich Campaign" begun in 1944 as Allied air attacks became more intense against Nazi Germany, Hopsten airfield became a hub for a multitude of Luftwaffe activity. Daily operations were conducted with the Messerschmitt Bf 109, Bf 110, Heinkel He 111, He 219 and Focke-Wulf Fw 190 aircraft. Starting in September 1944, the Messerschmitt Me 262 equipped Kampfgeschwader 51 (KG 51) "Edelweiß" was stationed at Hopsten. Known Luftwaffe units assigned to the airfield were:

- II./Jagdgeschwader 1 Oesau from Drope near Lingen.
- III./Jagdgeschwader 1 from Rheine-Bentlage AB.
- Stab and I./Jagdgeschwader 26 Schlageter from Drope and Fürstenau,
- II./Jagdgeschwader 26 from Nordhorn,
- III./Jagdgeschwader 26 from Plantlünne,
- Stab and l./Jagdgeschwader 27 Afrika from Rheine-Bentlage,
- II./ Jagdgeschwader 27 based locally at Hopsten,
- III./Jagdgeschwader 27 from Hesepe,
- IV./ Jagdgeschwader 27 from Achmer and
- III./Jagdgeschwader 54 Grünherz with its JG 190D-9 from Varrelbusch, Vörden and Fürstenau.

Towards the end of the war, Hopsten Airfield was a frequent target for allied air raids. But due to the extremely heavy air defence - with up to 500 AAA guns based in the vicinity of the airfield- and the fast repairs done to the runways, it remained relatively intact. Good camouflage and widely dispersed aircraft parking kept the airfield operational until the occupation by British troops. During the last days of the war, German units destroyed the infrastructure and made the airfield useless.

=== RAF Advanced Landing Ground B-112 ===
British forces moved through the area in early April 1945 after their crossing of the Rhine river (Operation Varsity) at Wesel. The Royal Air Force established a temporary presence at the airfield and it was designated as Advanced Landing Ground B-112 Hopsten on 6 April 1945.

After the war ended in May, the British decided it was not worth the effort to rehabilitate the airfield and it was abandoned.

=== Return to German military control ===
In 1956, only a few months after the establishment of the Bundeswehr, the new German Air Force began to set up new units and therefore needed airfields. In 1959, three years later, the German Defence Ministry decided to use the area of the former Hopsten airfield to build a new airfield from the ruins of the former World War II airfield .

Paid with NATO funds, specialized companies from the region were tasked to build a completely new airfield to modern NATO Standards, the north to south runway was 3,000 meters long and 30 meters wide, was constructed between the villages of Dreierwalde and Hopsten in the North and Hörstel in the South.

Ramp space, airfield infrastructure and roads, as well as a housing and administration complex in the city of Rheine eight kilometers away, were completed to new NATO standards for Western Europe. The old name of Hopsten was kept. It was the first new German airfield built to NATO standards.

In 1961 the new Jagdbombergeschwader 36 (JG 36) was equipped with United States Republic F-84F Thunderstreak jet fighter-bomber aircraft. The Wing held its first Open House on 16 June 1962. A crowd of 150,000 visitors attended from the Münster region, acknowledging the achievements of the wing personnel during the build-up phase.

In 1965 JG 36 received Lockheed F-104G Starfighters. On 4 February 1975, the Wing Commander Oberst Winfried Schwenke would bring the first assigned F-4F Phantom II with the serial 37+97 to Hopsten. As the F-4F Phantom II was a multirole aircraft, JG 36, would gain the secondary task of air defence.
