= Halászi =

- Coat of arms

- Location of Győr-Moson-Sopron county in Hungary

- Location of Halászi
- Coordinates: 47.88975°N 17.32498°E
- Country: Hungary
- County: Győr-Moson-Sopron

Government
  - Mayor: Majthényi Tamás (Fidesz-KDNP)

Area
  - Total: 36.45 km^{2} (14.07 sq mi)

Population (2022)
  - Total: 3,279
  - Density: 89.96/km^{2} (233.0/sq mi)
- Time zone: UTC+1 (CET)
  - Summer (DST): UTC+2 (CEST)
- Postal code: 9228
- Area code: 96

Halászi (German: Fischerdorf) is a village in Győr-Moson-Sopron county, Hungary.
