= Jagdgeschwader 71 (World War II) =

Fighter Wing 71
- Jagdgeschwader 71
- Active: 1939
- Country: Nazi Germany
- Branch: Luftwaffe
- Garrison/HQ: Schleißheim

Jagdgeschwader 71 was a fighter wing of Nazi Germany's Luftwaffe in World War II.

== Bibliography ==
- Tessin, Georg (1980). Die Landstreitkräfte: Namensverbände / Die Luftstreitkräfte: (Fliegende Verbände) / Flakeinsatz im Reich 1943–1945. Vol. 14. Osnabrück: Biblio. ISBN 3764811110.
