= Vyhanaščanskaje Lake =

Lake in Belarus

Vygonoshchanskoye
- Выгонощанское (Russian), Выганаўскае (Belarusian), Выганашчанскае (Belarusian)
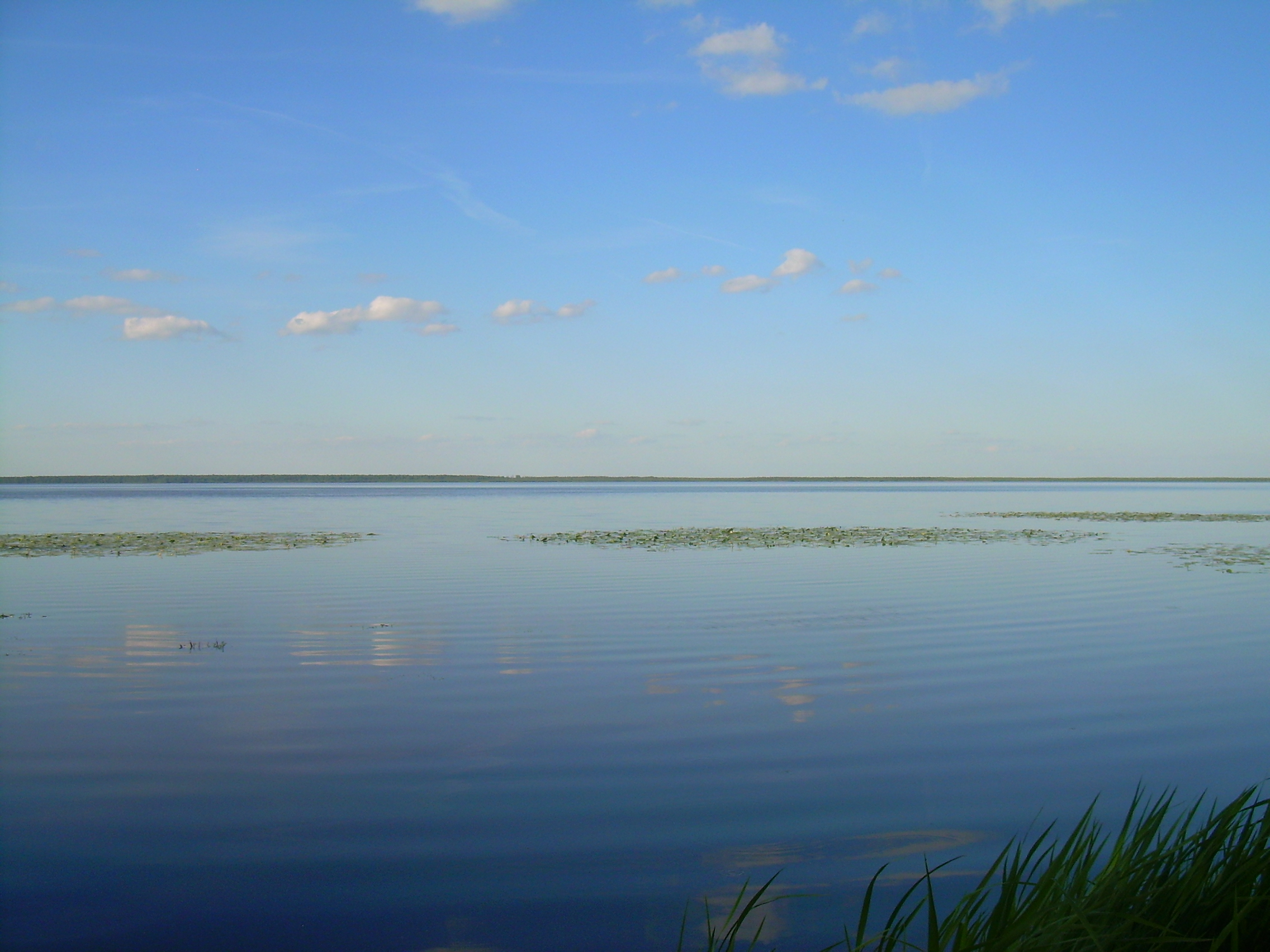

- Location within Belarus
- Coordinates: 52°41′3″N 25°56′50″E
- Surface area: 26 km^{2} (10 sq mi)
- Average depth: 1.2 m (3.9 ft)
- Max. depth: 2.3 m (7.5 ft)

Vygonoschanskoye Lake (Belarusian: Выганашчанскае) is located in the Ivatsevichy Raion, Brest Voblast, of Belarus. It is the sixth largest lake in Belarus. Its area is 26 km^{2} (10 sq mi). Its maximum depth is 2.3 m (8 ft) and its average depth is 1.2 m (4 ft).
