= Adolf Galland =

German World War II flying ace and general

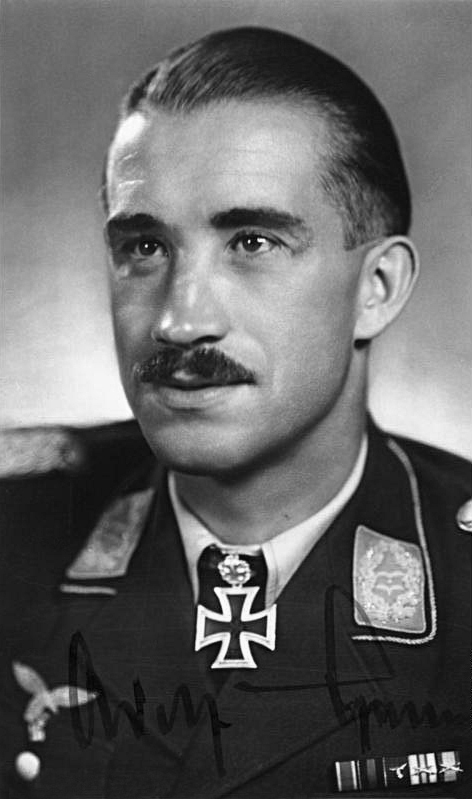
- Galland as Oberstleutnant
- Born: 19 March 1912; Westerholt, Province of Westphalia, Kingdom of Prussia, German Empire
- Died: 9 February 1996 (aged 83); Oberwinter, Rhineland-Palatinate, Germany
- Burial place: Cementerio, Oberwinter, Rhineland-Palatinate, Germany
- Relatives: Wilhelm-Ferdinand Galland; Paul Galland
- Military career
- Allegiance: Weimar Republic; Nazi Germany; Argentina
- Branch: Reichsheer; Luftwaffe; Argentine Air Force
- Service years: 1932–1955
- Rank: Generalleutnant (lieutenant general)
- Nicknames: Keffer, Dolfo
- Units: Condor Legion; LG 2, JG 27, JG 26, JV 44
- Commands: JG 26, JV 44
- Conflicts: See battles Spanish Civil War World War II: Invasion of Poland; Battle of Belgium; Battle of France; Battle of Britain; Channel Front (WIA); Defence of the Reich (WIA)
- Awards: Spanish Cross In Gold with Swords and Diamonds; Knight's Cross of the Iron Cross with Oak Leaves, Swords and Diamonds
- Other work: Aircraft consultant

Signature
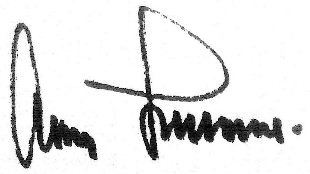

Adolf Josef Ferdinand Galland (19 March 1912 – 9 February 1996) was a German Luftwaffe general and flying ace who served throughout the Second World War in Europe. He flew 705 combat missions and fought on the Western Front and in the Defence of the Reich. On four occasions, he survived being shot down, and he was credited with 104 aerial victories, all of them against the Western Allies.

Galland, who was born in Westerholt, Recklinghausen, Province of Westphalia, Kingdom of Prussia, in the German Empire, became a glider pilot in 1929 before he joined the Luft Hansa. In 1932, he graduated as a pilot at the Deutsche Verkehrsfliegerschule (German Commercial Flyers' School) in Braunschweig before applying to join the Reichswehr of the Weimar Republic later in the year. Galland's application was accepted, but he never took up the offer. In February 1934, he was transferred to the Luftwaffe. In 1937, during the Spanish Civil War, he volunteered for the Condor Legion and flew ground attack missions in support of the Nationalists under Francisco Franco. After finishing his tour in 1938 Galland was employed in the Air Ministry writing doctrinal and technical manuals about his experiences as a ground-attack pilot. During this period Galland served as an instructor for ground-attack units. During the German invasion of Poland in September 1939, he again flew ground attack missions. In early 1940, Galland managed to persuade his superiors to allow him to become a fighter pilot.

Galland flew Messerschmitt Bf 109s during the Battle of France and the Battle of Britain. By the end of 1940, his tally of victories had reached 57. In 1941, Galland stayed in France and fought the Royal Air Force (RAF) over the English Channel and Northern France. By November 1941, his tally had increased to 96, by which time he had earned the Knight's Cross of the Iron Cross with Oak Leaves and Swords. In November 1941, Werner Mölders, who commanded the German Fighter Force as the General der Jagdflieger, was killed while a passenger in a flying accident and Galland succeeded him, staying in the position until January 1945. As General der Jagdflieger, Galland was forbidden to fly combat missions.

In late January and early February 1942, Galland first planned and then commanded the Luftwaffe's air cover for the Kriegsmarine Operation Cerberus, which was a major success. It earned him the Knight's Cross of the Iron Cross with Oak Leaves, Swords and Diamonds. Over the ensuing years, Galland's disagreements with Reichsmarschall Hermann Göring about how best to combat the Allied Air Forces bombing of Germany caused their relationship to deteriorate. The Luftwaffe fighter force was under severe pressure by 1944, and Galland was blamed by Göring for the failure to prevent the Allied strategic bombing of Germany in daylight. The relationship collapsed altogether in early January 1945, when Galland was relieved of his command because of his constant criticism of the Luftwaffe leadership. Galland was then put under house arrest following the so-called Fighter Pilots' Revolt, in which senior fighter pilots confronted Göring about the conduct of the air war.

In March 1945, Galland returned to operational flying and was permitted to form a jet fighter unit which he called Jagdverband 44. He flew missions over Germany until the end of the war in May. After the war, Galland was employed by Argentina's Government and acted as a consultant to the Argentine Air Force. Later, he returned to Germany and managed his own business. Galland also became friends with many former enemies, such as RAF aces Robert Stanford Tuck and Douglas Bader.

== Early life ==
Galland was born in Westerholt (now Herten), Westphalia on 19 March 1912 to a family with French Huguenot ancestry. The first Galland in Westerholt arrived from Veynes in 1792, becoming a bailiff to the count von Westerholt, and beginning a family tradition. Adolf Galland (junior) was the second of four sons of Adolf Galland (senior) and his French wife Anna, née Schipper. Galland (senior) worked as the land manager or bailiff to the Count von Westerholt. Galland's older brother was Fritz and his two younger brothers were Wilhelm-Ferdinand and Paul. Their father had pet names for all his family members. His wife Anna was called "Anita". Fritz, his older brother, was "Toby", Adolf was "Keffer", Wilhelm-Ferdinand was "Wutz" and Paul was "Paulinchen", or since they were expecting a girl, occasionally "Paula".

His two younger brothers also became fighter pilots and aces. Paul claimed 17 victories, before being shot down and killed on 31 October 1942. Wilhelm-Ferdinand, credited with 55 victories, was shot down and killed on 17 August 1943.

In 1927, Galland's lifelong interest in flying started when a group of aviation enthusiasts brought a glider club to Borkenberge, a heath east of the Haltern-Münster railway and part of the Westerholt estate. It was here that the Gelsenkirchen Luftsportverein (Air Sports Club of Gelsenkirchen) created an interest in flying among young Germans. Galland travelled by foot or horse-drawn wagon 30 kilometres (19 mi) to help prepare the gliders for flight until his father bought him a motorcycle. By 19 Galland was a glider pilot. In 1932 he completed pilot training at the Gelsenkirchen Luftsportverein.

Under the Treaty of Versailles, Germany was denied an air force. They were however allowed gliders, which became the way for aspiring pilots to begin their flight training. The sport became so popular that the Reichswehr set up ten schools, at least one in each of the seven military districts of Germany. The military also published a magazine, Flugsport (Flight Sport), to encourage an interest in aviation and began a series of glider competitions around the country. Galland had learned the basic laws of flight and flying technique on paper, but found they did not always work in reality; his inexperience caused a few accidents. One of his tutors, Georg Ismer, taught him various techniques and in 1929 the 17-year-old Galland passed his A certificate. This was one of three certificates he needed for his professional license. When he eventually attained his B and C certificates, his father promised to buy him his own glider if he also passed his matriculations examinations, which he succeeded in doing. Galland became an outstanding glider pilot; he became an instructor before he had passed his Abitur.

== Early military career ==
In February 1932, Galland graduated from Hindenburg Gymnasium (high school) in Buer and was among 20 personnel who were accepted to the aviation school of Germany's national airline, Luft Hansa. During the final years of the Weimar Republic, jobs were scarce, and life was hard for the Galland family economically. Adolf had some experience of flying gliders, so he applied to the Deutsche Verkehrsfliegerschule or DVS (German Commercial Flying School) which was heavily subsidised by Luft Hansa. He was one of 100 successful applicants out of 4,000. After ten days of evaluations, he was among just 18 selected for flight training. Adolf was then assessed on performance. Those that did not reach the standard were sent home.

Galland's first flight was in an Albatros L 101. Galland had two notable accidents; a heavy landing damaged the undercarriage of his aircraft and a collision. Galland was judged to have employed poor formation tactics in the latter incident. Galland applied to join the German Army in the belief he had failed to pass. In the meantime, he carried on with his flight training. Flights in an Albatros L 75 and the award of a B1 certificate allowed him to fly large aircraft over 2,500 kilograms (5,500 lb) in weight. He discovered the Army accepted his application, but the flying school refused to release him. By Christmas 1932, he had logged 150 hours flying and had obtained a B2 certificate.

Early in 1933, Galland was sent to the Baltic Sea training base at Warnemünde to train on flying boats. Galland disliked learning what he perceived to be "seamanship" but logged 25 hours in these aircraft. Soon afterward, along with several other pilots, he was ordered to attend an interview at the Zentrale der Verkehrsflieger Schule (ZVS – Central Airline Pilot School). The group were interviewed by military personnel in civilian clothing. After being informed of a secret military training program being built that involved piloting high performance aircraft, all the pilots accepted an invitation to join the organisation.

=== Into the Luftwaffe ===
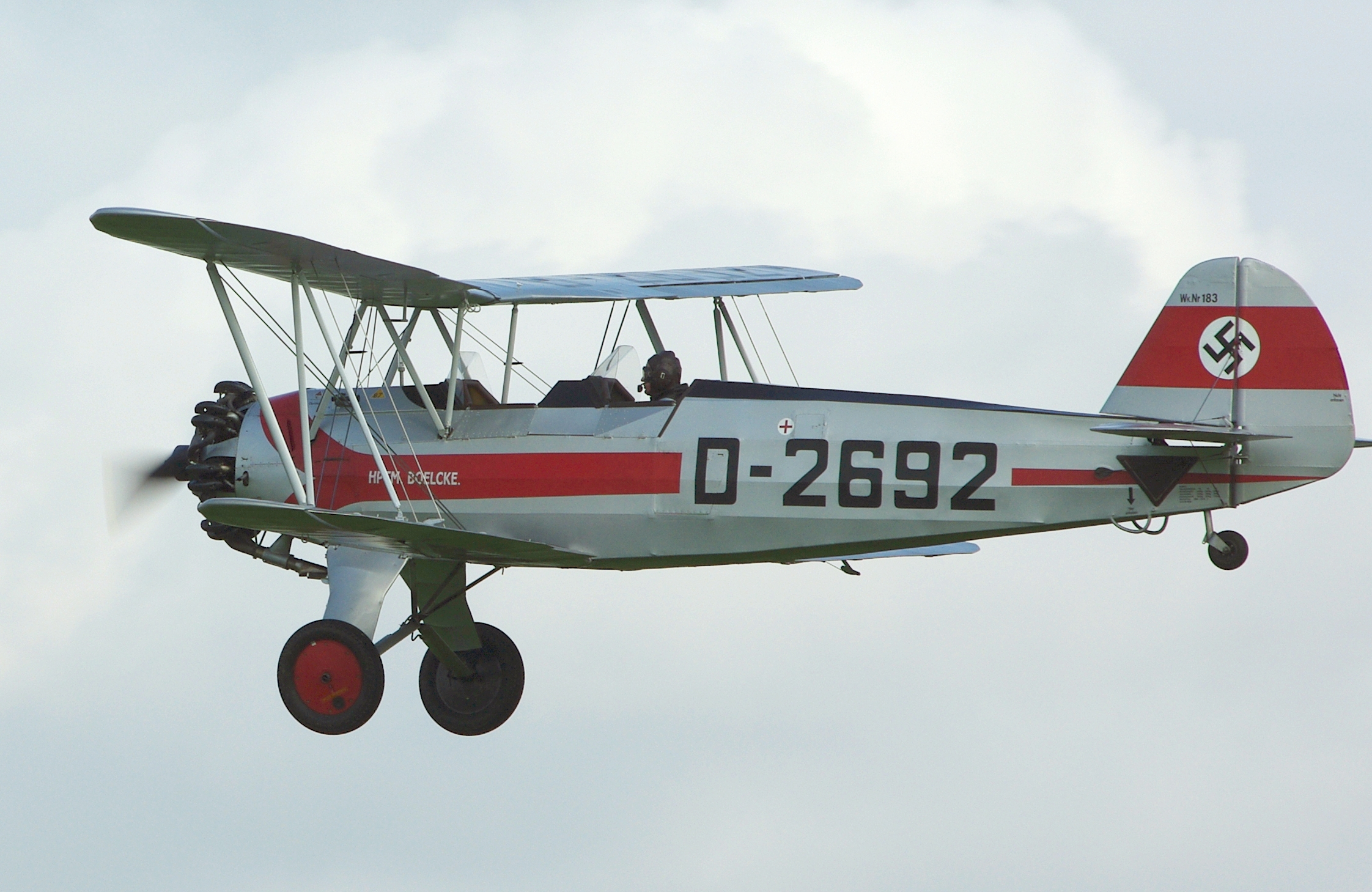
Galland trained on a Focke-Wulf Fw 44J

In May 1933, Galland was ordered to a meeting in Berlin as one of 12 civilian pilots among 70 airmen who came from clandestine programmes, meeting Hermann Göring for the first time. Galland was impressed by Göring and believed him to be a competent leader. In July 1933, Galland travelled to Italy to train with the Regia Aeronautica (Italian Air Force).

In September 1933, Galland returned to Germany and flew in some minor competitions as a glider pilot, winning some prizes. Soon afterwards he returned to the ZVS to learn instrument flying and receive training in piloting heavy transport aircraft logging another 50 hours. As a part of his training, beginning in October 1933, Galland flew Luft Hansa airliners, piloting the Junkers G24 from Stuttgart to Barcelona in Spain, via Geneva and Marseille. In December 1933, Galland was recalled to the ZVS headquarters and offered the chance to join the new Luftwaffe. Galland found the choice hard. He wanted the adventure of a military flying career, but as an airline pilot, Galland had enjoyed the lifestyle of flying and visiting exotic places and was reluctant to give it up. Nevertheless, he decided to officially join the Luftwaffe.

After basic training in the Army, he was discharged from his barracks in Dresden in October 1934. In February 1935 Galland was now part of 900 airmen waiting to be inducted to the new ReichsLuftwaffe. In March Galland was ordered to report to Jagdgeschwader 2 (Fighter Wing 2), arriving at its headquarters in Jüterbog-Damm Airfield in Jüterbog on 1 April 1935. Galland's performance had not yet been impressive enough for a position as an instructor, so he was evaluated and deemed good enough for an operational posting.

In October 1935, during aerobatic manoeuvre training, he crashed a Focke-Wulf Fw 44 biplane and was in a coma for three days, other injuries were a damaged eye, fractured skull and broken nose. When Galland recovered, he was declared unfit for flying by the doctors. A friend, Major Rheital, kept the doctor's report secret to allow Adolf to continue flying. The expansion of the Luftwaffe and his own Geschwader (wing) flooded the administration officers and Galland's medical report was overlooked. Within a year, Galland showed no signs of injury from his crash. In October 1936 he crashed an Arado Ar 68 and was hospitalised again, aggravating his injured eye. It was at this point his previous medical report came to light again and Galland's unfit certificate was discovered. Major Rheital was rumoured to have undergone a court-martial, but the investigators dropped the charges. Galland, however, was grounded. He admitted having fragments of glass in his eye, but convinced the doctors he was fit for flying duty. Galland was ordered to undergo eye tests to validate his claims. Before the testing could begin, one of his brothers managed to acquire the charts. Adolf memorised the charts passing the test and was permitted to fly again.

=== Condor Legion ===
During the Spanish Civil War, Galland was appointed Staffelkapitän of a Condor Legion unit, 3. Staffel of Jagdgruppe 88 (J/88 – 88th Fighter Group), (Note: Jagdgruppe 88, a four Staffel Gruppe.) which was sent to support the Nationalist side under Franco at Ferrol from mid-1937. Galland flew ground attack missions in Heinkel He 51s. In Spain, Galland first displayed his unique style: flying in swimming trunks with a cigar between his teeth in an aircraft decorated with a Mickey Mouse figure. When asked why he developed this style, he gave a simple answer:

I like Mickey Mouse. I always have. And I like cigars, but I had to give them up after the war.

Galland flew his first of 300 combat missions in Spain with the J/88 commander Gotthard Handrick, on 24 July 1937, near Brunete. During his time in Spain, Galland analysed the engagements, evaluated techniques and devised new ground-attack tactics which were passed on to the Luftwaffe. His experiences in pin-point ground assaults were used by Ernst Udet, a proponent of the dive bomber and leading supporter of the Junkers Ju 87 to push for Stuka wings. Wolfram von Richthofen, an opponent of Udet's, used them to push for the opposite: Schlachtflieger dual combination fighter-bombers. After trials with Henschel Hs 123s, Bf 109s and Ju 87s, the Junkers was selected to undergo trials for the dive bomber role.

During his time in Spain, he developed early gasoline and oil bombs, suggested the quartering of personnel on trains to aid in relocation, and following the Nationalist victory was awarded the ‘Spanish Cross in Gold with Swords and Diamonds' for his contributions. On 24 May 1938 Galland left Spain and was replaced by Werner Mölders. Before leaving he made ten flights in the Bf 109; deeply impressed with the performance of the aircraft, it persuaded him to change from a strike pilot to a fighter pilot. Galland's fellow student and friend at the Kriegsschule in Dresden, Johannes Janke, later said of him "a very good pilot and excellent shot, but ambitious and he wanted to get noticed. A parvenu. He was crazy about hunting anything, from a sparrow to a man."

=== Staff post in the RLM ===
From May to August 1938, Galland took leave and visited Spanish Morocco. On his return to Germany, he was ordered to the headquarters of the Reichsluftfahrtministerium (RLM – Ministry of Aviation) where he was tasked with preparing recommendations on the subject of close air support. Galland favoured the virtually simultaneous attack of the air force before the Army advance, leaving their opponents no time to recover. While this reasserted the lessons of World War I, some of the Officer Corps were still pessimistic as to whether that kind of coordination was possible. Galland also adopted the Italian suggestion of heavy armament and criticised the light machine guns in early German fighter aircraft and pointed to the advantages of multi-gun configurations (combining machine guns with cannon). These proved successful in the Bf 109 and Focke-Wulf Fw 190. He also recognised the innovation of drop tanks to extend the range of aircraft as well as the need for specialised tactics for escorting bomber fleets; Galland did not subscribe to the prevailing idea in the Luftwaffe (and RAF) that "the bomber would always get through" (alone). All of Galland's suggestions were adopted and proved successful in the early campaigns, 1939–41. During his time in the RLM, he instructed, trained and equipped ground-support wings for Fall Grün (Case Green), the invasion of Czechoslovakia in 1938. However, the invasion did not take place.

Unluckily for Galland, his excellence at evaluation earned him a place at Tutow training facility where he was asked to test fly prototype reconnaissance and strike aircraft. This was not what he wanted, and he hoped to be returned to a fighter unit to fly the Messerschmitt Bf 109. During his time there, he gave positive evaluations on types such as the Focke-Wulf Fw 189 and Henschel Hs 129. During his test piloting career at Tutow, Galland received unwelcome news; he was to become Gruppenkommandeur (group commander) of II.(Schlacht)/Lehrgeschwader 2 (II.(S)/LG 2 – 2nd battle group of the 2nd Demonstration Wing). It was not a fighter unit, but a special mixed Geschwader of ground attack aircraft. On 1 November 1938, I. Gruppe (1st group) of Jagdgeschwader 433 (JG 433—433rd Fighter Wing) was formed at the Ingolstadt-Manching Airfield, 60 kilometers (37 miles) north of Munich. Initially the Gruppe was placed under the command of Hauptmann Dietrich Graf von Pfeil und Klein-Ellguth and equipped with the Bf 109 D-1 fighter aircraft. That day, Galland was appointed Staffelkapitän of the Gruppe's 1. Staffel (2nd squadron). On 1 May 1939, the Gruppe was renamed and became I. Gruppe of Jagdgeschwader 52 (JG 52—52nd Fighter Wing). Galland served in this capacity until 31 July 1939 when he was transferred to take command of 5.(S)/LG 2.

== Combat career (1939–1941) ==
=== Invasion of Poland ===
Just before the outbreak of war, Galland was promoted to Hauptmann. During the invasion of Poland from 1 September 1939 onward, he flew with 4. Staffel of II./Lehrgeschwader 2. Equipped with the Henschel Hs 123, nicknamed the "biplane Stuka," supporting the German Tenth Army. On 1 September, Galland flew alone in a Fieseler Fi 156 'Storch' on a reconnaissance mission and was nearly shot down. The next day he flew ground attack missions in support of the 1st Panzer Division advancing to the Warta River. Galland's Geschwader flew intensive sorties in support of the division and XVI Army Corps at Kraków, Radom, Dęblin and L'vov. The German Army had reached the Vistula river near Warsaw by 7 September and the Luftwaffe had been executing the kind of close air support operations Galland had been advocating. Galland participated in the maximum effort by the Luftwaffe during the Battle of Bzura. On 11 September, during one of his visits to the front, Adolf Hitler arrived at LG 2 headquarters for lunch with the staff. Such was the state of the Polish Air Force and Polish Army, that by 19 September 1939 some German air units were withdrawn from the campaign. Galland ceased combat operations on this date, having flown 87 missions. After flying nearly 360 missions in two wars and averaging two missions per day, on 13 September 1939, Galland was awarded the Iron Cross Second Class (Eisernes Kreuz zweiter Klasse).

After the end of the campaign, Galland claimed to be suffering from rheumatism and therefore unfit for flying in open-cockpit aircraft, such as the Hs 123. He tactfully suggested a transfer to a single-engine aircraft type with a closed cockpit would improve his condition. His request was accepted on medical grounds. Galland was removed from his post as a direct ground support pilot. Galland never explained whether open cockpits had caused the complaint or some other cause; given his performance with eye specialists, a certain amount of suspicion is reasonable. He was transferred to Jagdgeschwader 27 (JG 27—Fighter Wing 27) on 10 February 1940 as the adjutant, restricting him from flying.

=== Western Europe ===
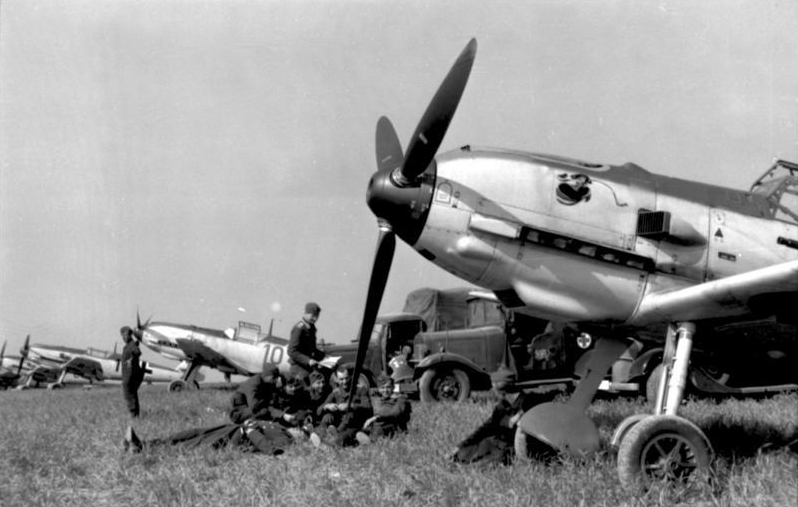
Messerschmitt Bf 109Es, 1940. Galland flew the Bf 109 in air-to-air combat for the first time over France and Belgium.

After his transfer to JG 27, Galland met Mölders again. Due to his injuries, Galland could never match Mölders' sharp eyesight; the shards of glass in his eyes denied him that capacity. However, Mölders, by that time a recognised ace shared what experiences he could with Galland; leadership in the air, tactics and organisation. Mölders was Geschwaderkommodore of Jagdgeschwader 53 at the time of their meeting. For Galland to gain experience on the Bf 109E, which he lacked, Mölders offered him the chance to join his unit. Galland learned Mölders' tactics, such as using spotter aircraft to indicate the position of enemy formation. Galland learned to allow a Staffel to operate freely in order to seize the initiative. Taking his experiences back to JG 27, its commander Max Ibel, agreed to their implementation. Galland gained further experience as a combat leader acting as Gruppenkommandeur, when the officer commanding went on leave.

On 10 May 1940, the Wehrmacht invaded the Low Countries and France under the codename Fall Gelb. JG 27 supported German forces in the Battle for Belgium. On the third day of the offensive, 12 May 1940, 7 kilometres (4.3 mi) west of Liège, Belgium, at a height of about 4,000 metres (13,000 ft), flying a Bf 109, Galland, with Gustav Rödel as his wingman, claimed his first aerial victories, over two Royal Air Force (RAF) Hawker Hurricanes. Both aircraft were from No. 87 Squadron. The Hurricanes had been escorting Bristol Blenheim bombers to bomb bridges in the Netherlands. Galland remembered; "My first kill was child's play. An excellent weapon and luck had been on my side. To be successful, the best fighter pilot needs both"— Galland pursued one of the "scattering" Hurricanes and shot down another at low level. The pilot, a Canadian, Flying Officer Jack Campbell was killed.

Galland claimed his third Hurricane later that same day over Tienen. He had long believed that his opponents had been Belgian, not knowing that all of the Belgian Air Force's Hurricanes had been destroyed on the ground in the first two days, without seeing combat. On 19 May, Galland shot down a French Potez aircraft. During this flight he ran out of fuel short of the runway and landed nearby, at the base of a hill. With the help of soldiers from a German Flak battery, he pushed the Bf 109 up the hill and then glided down to the Charleville-Mézières airfield in the valley below. He sent back a can of fuel for his wingman, who had also landed short of the runway. He continued flying and the next day, claimed another three more aircraft, making a total of seven. For this he was awarded the Iron Cross First Class (Eisernes Kreuz erster Klasse) from Erhard Milch on 22 May.

With the effective defeat of Belgium JG 27 was moved into forward airfields to support the invasion of France. During the Battle of Dunkirk, after encountering the Supermarine Spitfire for the first time, Galland was impressed with these aircraft and their pilots. On 29 May, Galland claimed he had shot down a Bristol Blenheim over the sea. (Note: This might have been a Blenheim from RAF No. 21 Squadron that managed to return to base that day, heavily damaged, and made a belly landing.) Over Dunkirk, the Luftwaffe suffered its first serious rebuff of the war. As Galland has noted, the nature and style of the air battles over the beaches should have provided a warning as to the inherent weaknesses of the Luftwaffe's force structure. On 3 June during Operation Paula, he claimed another French aircraft, a Morane-Saulnier M.S.406 for his 12th victory.

On 6 June 1940, Galland took over the command of III./Jagdgeschwader 26 "Schlageter" (III./JG 26–3rd group of the 26th Fighter Wing) with the position of Gruppenkommandeur. Under his command were the 7., 8. and 9. Staffels with an establishment of 39 Bf 109Es. His Staffelkapitäns included Joachim Müncheberg, Wilhelm Balthasar and Gerhard Schöpfel. Balthasar, Staffelkapitän of 7. Staffel had mistakenly attacked Galland during Fall Rot (Case Red). Being on the same radio frequency, Galland was able to warn Balthasar before he opened fire. The remainder of the campaign passed without incident and on 26 June, Major Gotthard Handrick took over command of JG 26. Galland was pleased, having served under him during his Condor Legion days.

=== Battle of Britain ===
From June 1940 on, Galland flew as the Gruppenkommandeur of III./JG 26 (JG 26), fighting in the Battle of Britain. On 19 July 1940, he was promoted to major and JG 26 moved to the Pas de Calais, where they were to remain for the next 18 months with III./JG 26 based at Caffiers.

On 24 July 1940, almost 40 Bf 109s of III./JG 26 took off for operations over the English Channel—a phase of the battle known as the Kanalkampf. They were met by 12 54 Squadron Spitfires. The Spitfires forced the larger number of Bf 109s into a turning battle that ran down the Germans' fuel. Galland recalled being impressed by the Spitfire's ability to outmanoeuvre Bf 109s at low speed and to turn into the Bf 109s within little airspace. Only by executing a "Split S" (a half-roll onto his back, followed by pulling into a long, curving dive) that the Spitfire could not follow without its float carburettor causing a temporary loss of engine power, could his aircraft escape back to France at low altitude. The II. Gruppe of JG 52 covered their retreat, losing two Bf 109s to Spitfires from No. 610 Squadron. During the action, two Spitfires were shot down for the loss of four Bf 109s. Galland was shocked by the aggression shown by pilots he initially believed to be relatively inexperienced. Galland later said he realised there would be no quick and easy victory.

As the battles over the Channel continued, Galland shot down Spitfires on 25 and 28 July. On 1 August 1940, Galland was awarded the Knight's Cross of the Iron Cross (Ritterkreuz des Eisernen Kreuzes) for his 17 victories. Galland continued to make fighter sweeps over southern England before the main assault opened. On 11 August, Galland's unit engaged 74 Squadron. In a brief dogfight, one Spitfire was shot down. During these battles the RAF seemed to know just where and when to send their aircraft. This made Galland suspect a high level of organisation was at work controlling RAF fighters. The cloudy skies of Britain were a dangerous environment to confront an enemy that had an effective ground control system. Galland resolved to fly higher, where he could see most things and where the Bf 109 performed at its best.

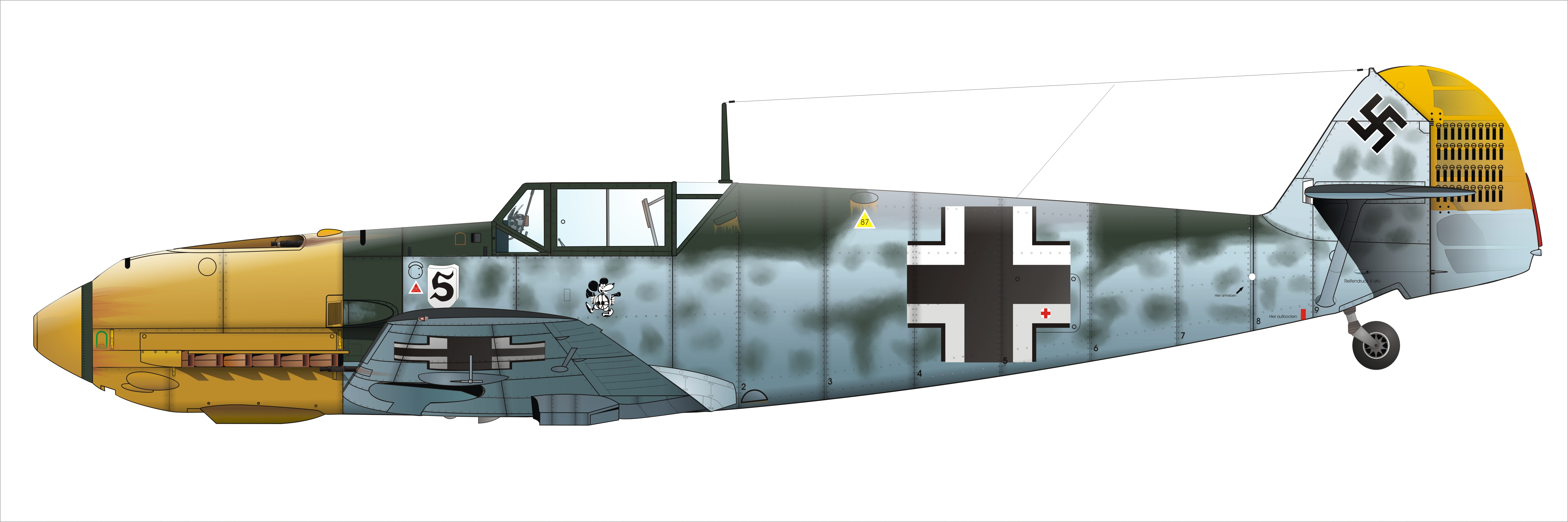
Galland's Messerschmitt Bf 109E

By 15 August, in two weeks' fighting over Britain, Galland had increased his own tally to 21. On this day he claimed three Spitfires. This put him to within three victories of Mölders, who had claimed the highest number of enemy aircraft destroyed and who was wounded and grounded with a damaged knee. One of Galland's claims was against 54 Squadron RAF that had surprised him with their aggressive attacks three weeks before. JG 26 claimed nine Spitfires in the air battle—Galland himself filing a claim for a Spitfire at 12:55 off Folkestone. Only two 54 Squadron Spitfires were lost in the late-morning early afternoon battle. Galland's claim matches the loss of a Spitfire piloted by Sergeant N. A Lawrence who was rescued with severe shock. In the afternoon of that same day, Galland claimed two more Spitfires from 64 Squadron. JG 26 claimed eight of the unit's Spitfires which were all officially "confirmed" by the Germans. However, only two of the RAF fighters were hit and both were destroyed. Pilot Officer C. J. D Andreae was killed in R6990 and R. Roberts bailed out of K9964. Galland and his pilots remained ignorant of the disastrous losses suffered by other German units and the defeat of their attacks by the RAF.

Galland was summoned to Karinhall on 18 August 1940, and missed the intense air battle that day, known as The Hardest Day. During the meeting, Göring insisted that, in combat, Bf 109 fighters escort Bf 110s, which could not survive against single-engine fighters. As high-scoring aces, both Galland and Mölders shared their concerns that close escort of Bf 110s and bombers robbed fighter pilots of their freedom to roam and engage the enemy on their own terms. They also pointed to the fact that German bombers flew at medium altitudes and low speed, the best height area and speed for the manoeuvrability of the Spitfire. Galland resented his pilots having to carry out a task unsuited to their equipment but Göring would not move from his position. Galland claimed that fighting spirit was also affected when his pilots were tasked with close-escort missions:

The worst disadvantage of this type of escort was not aerodynamic but lay in its deep contradiction of the basic function of fighter aircraft—to use speed and maneuverability to seek, find, and destroy enemy aircraft, in this case, those of Fighter Command. The [Bf 109s] were bound to the bombers and could not leave until attacked, thus giving their opponent the advantage of surprise, initiative, superior altitude, greater speed, and above all fighting spirit, the aggressive attitude which marks all successful fighter pilots.

=== Wing Commander ===
Galland returned to action on 22 August 1940, replacing Gotthard Handrick as Geschwaderkommodore of JG 26. Major Handrick was an ineffective and indecisive combat commander by some accounts and took a passive role in leading his fighter pilots. Göring grew frustrated with the lack of aggressiveness of several of his fighter-wing commanders, and on 22 August, he replaced Handrick with Adolf Galland.

In the aftermath of Galland's appointment, he became aware his pilots were dissatisfied with themselves, the bombers, and particularly the leadership. Galland could not change Göring's mind with respect to the escort fighter mission, but he did take immediate actions to improve pilot morale. The first thing Galland did as Kommodore was to replace ineffective group and squadron commanders with younger, more aggressive, and more successful—in terms of aerial engagements—officers in the wing. He also increased the wing staff flight from Handrick's two-aircraft formation to a more lethal four-fighter formation. Galland was not content to lead from behind as his predecessor had been. Galland flew as often as possible and led the most difficult missions in order to encourage his men and gain respect.

Galland's appointment made no impact on his successes. From 25 August until 14 September, Galland filed claims for victories 23–32. This included three claims on 31 August, for two Spitfires and a Hurricane to take his tally to 27. His 25th victim may have been from 19 Squadron which was claimed 20 kilometres (12 mi) south of Cambridge at 09:42. Klaus Mietusch also accounted for one for his 7th victory. Three 19 Squadron Spitfires were shot down in the morning near North Weald. Pilot Officer R. A. C Aeberhardt was killed in a crash-landing in Spitfire R6912 while Flying Officer T. J. B Coward was wounded in the foot and F.N Brinsden was unhurt. He bailed out of R6958. On 6 September, Galland claimed his 30th victory over a 601 Squadron Hurricane. JG 26 claimed two more of them shot down that morning; 601 lost four Hurricanes; Flying Officer W. H. Rhodes-Moorehouse and Flight Lieutenant C. R. Davis were killed while Flying Officer J. Toplnicki and Pilot Officer H. T. Gilbert were wounded.

During the battle, the fighter pilots were criticised by Göring for the growing bomber losses. In a front line general officer briefing on Luftwaffe tactics, Göring asked what his fighter pilots needed to win the battle. Werner Mölders replied that he would like the Bf 109 to be fitted with more powerful engines. Galland replied: "I should like an outfit of Spitfires for my squadron." which left Göring speechless with rage. Galland still preferred the Bf 109 for offensive sweeps, but he regarded the Spitfire as a better defensive fighter, owing to its manoeuvrability.

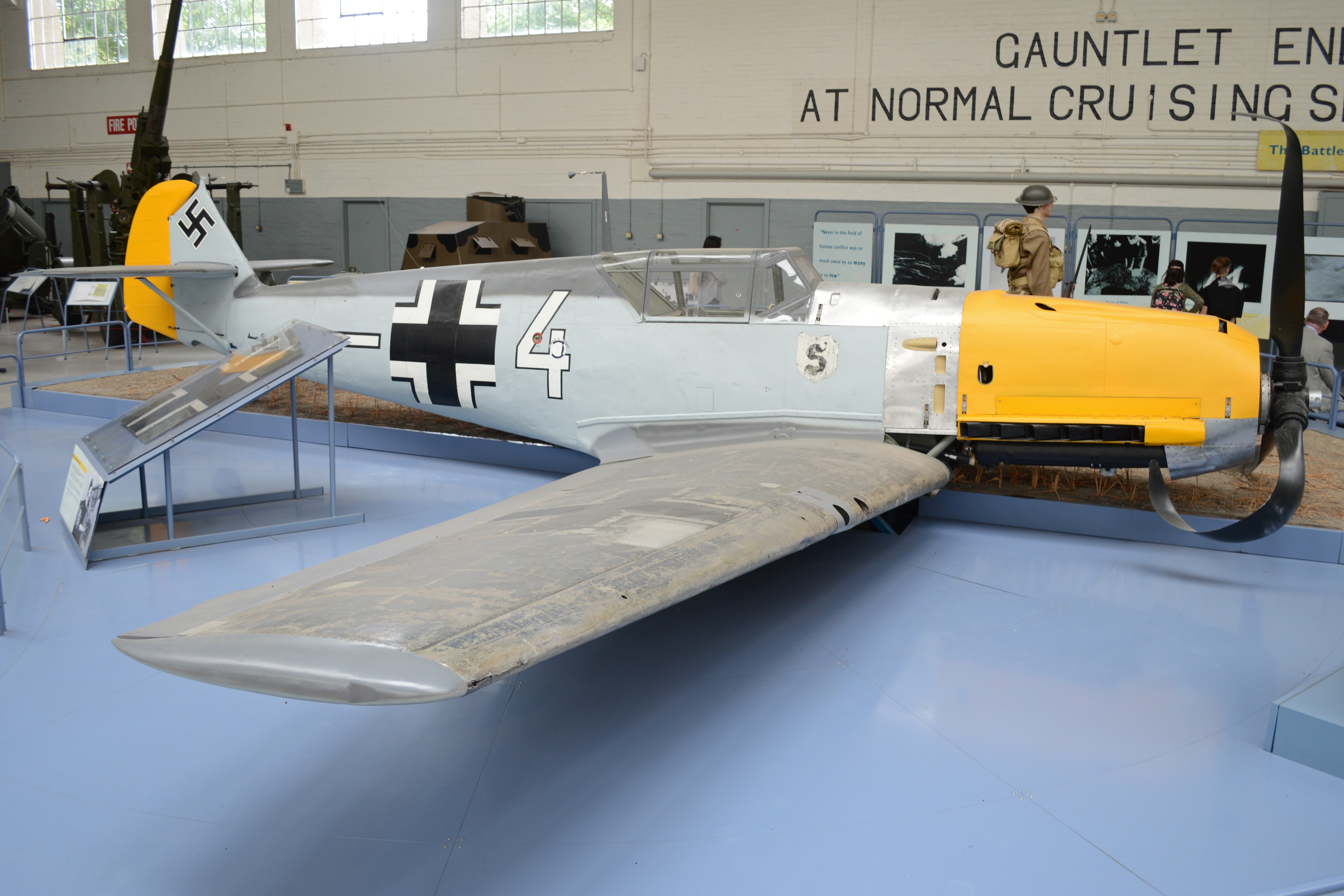
A BF 109E-3, JG 26. Typical of the aircraft flown by Galland. This example was captured on 30 September 1940. Imperial War Museum Duxford

During the Battle of Britain, the question of killing enemy pilots while in their parachutes was raised. In another conversation with Göring, Galland recalled: "Göring wanted to know if we had ever thought about this. "Jawohl, Herr Reichsmarschall!" He looked me straight in the eyes and said, 'What would you think of an order to shoot down pilots who were bailing out?' 'I should regard it as murder, Herr Reichsmarschall', I told him, 'I should do everything in my power to disobey such an order'. 'That is just the reply I had expected from you, Galland.'" Galland later stated that he thought Göring may have been asking him this question so as to have an answer if the question was ever posed to him, as opposed to the implication that Göring would be in favour of such an action. In practice, this act of mercy was usually not applied. German airmen in parachutes were lost as prisoners of war, but British airmen could live to fight again and were considered combatants. Hugh Dowding, air officer commanding, detested the practice but in his view it conformed to the laws of war at the time.

Galland passed another serious test on 15 September, the date known as Battle of Britain Day. In large-scale clashes Galland claimed his 33rd air victory over a Hurricane while leading JG 26. Over the Thames Estuary, Galland fought an unsuccessful battle with eight Hurricanes which caused a loss of altitude to 800 metres (2,600 ft). Galland spotted two more Hurricanes below and attacked in a classic ambush style from the enemy's blind spot. His wingman claimed the other. The two fighters were from the Czechoslovak No. 310 Squadron RAF. Galland's victim, Sergeant J. Hubacek reported that he did not see his assailant. The other pilot also survived.

On 23 September, Galland became the third member of the Wehrmacht to receive the Knight's Cross of the Iron Cross with Oak Leaves for achieving his 39th and 40th aerial victories. On 25 September, he was summoned to Berlin to receive the award from Adolf Hitler. Galland was granted a personal audience with Hitler and during the meeting Galland reported to Hitler that the British had proven tough opponents, and that there were signs of declining morale in the German fighter force in the absence of operational success. Hitler expressed his regret for the war with the "Anglo-Saxons", who he admired, but resolved to fight until total destruction.

Morale and exhaustion became a problem in September. The Luftwaffe lacked the pilots and aircraft to maintain a constant presence over Britain. To compensate, commanders demanded three to four sorties per day by the most experienced men. Galland recognised the manifest fatigue of his pilots. By the end of September, Galland noticed that "the stamina of the superbly trained and experienced original [cadre of pilots] was down to a point where operational efficiency was being impaired." Several factors contributed to this situation; Göring's interference with tactics without regard for the situation or the capabilities of German aircraft; rapid adaptation to German tactics by the British; the poorer quality replacement pilots to JG 26. This situation led to a conflict between the two significant psychological needs of the fighter pilots: confidence in their aircraft and tactics.

Galland innovated tactically to improve the situation and found a partial solution to Göring's irrational order to maintain close escort. He developed a flexible escort system that allowed his pilots constantly to change altitude, airspeed, direction, and distance to the bombers during these close-escort missions. The results were better and acceptable to his pilots. By the end of the Battle of Britain, JG 26 had gained a reputation as one of only two fighter wings that performed escort duties with consistently low losses to the bombers.

The fighter-bomber mission was also a problem Galland had to deal with. Göring was committed to fitting one-third of all fighter wings to use modified Bf 109s to carry bombs. Galland accepted the mission but damaged the morale he had cultivated. Galland's response to the situation was to develop tactics that mixed the bomb-laden Bf 109s with the fighter escort in an effort to deceive the enemy and confound their intercept plans. This tactic slowed down the fighter-bomber losses, but the pilots still felt as though they were being wasted. Galland's leadership still made several errors; Galland did not capitalise on training opportunities to improve the bombing accuracy of his pilots; he did not discipline those pilots who were prone to jettison their bombs early; he only participated as an escort, violating his own dictum of not asking the men to do something that he would not, while failing to convey to his men these missions were worthy of his attention. Galland's decision was even more difficult to understand given his service as a ground attack pilot.

The Battle of Britain continued with large-scale dogfights well past 31 October, considered by some historians as the end of the campaign. A further eight victories—six Spitfires and two Hurricanes—were claimed in October including three on 30 October, which took his tally to 50—the last two victims were claimed at 16:00 CET and were likely from 41 Squadron. Pilot Officer G. G. F. Draper was wounded and Sergeant L. A. Garvey was killed. On 15 November, Galland flew his 150th combat mission and the following day claimed his 53rd and 54th successes against No. 17 Squadron RAF. The accuracy of Galland's claims have been assessed, and one source asserts that 44 of his 54 claims can be verified through British records and five definitely could not be reconciled with RAF losses.

In November, a further six victories including four Hurricanes were accounted for – to raise his recorded victories to 51–56, putting him level with the late Helmut Wick, who had been shot down and killed on 28 November. On 5 December, Galland recorded his 57th victory. This made him the most successful fighter pilot of the war at that point, putting him ahead of his colleague, friend and rival Werner Mölders. Analysis conducted by James Corum found that the number of leading fighter pilots were small, but they shared special and indefinable qualities in piloting, particularly marksmanship, hunting skills and situational awareness. Corum found that during the Battle of Britain, Galland accounted for 14% of all JG 26's aerial successes, from a unit of around 120 pilots. Four of the wing's fighter pilots claimed an astounding 31% of all aircraft shot down.

=== Channel Front ===
In March 1941, Göring held a major conference for units in the west. After describing in detail the coming air offensive against Britain, he secretly admitted to Adolf Galland and Werner Mölders that "there's not a word of truth in it." The Luftwaffe was to transfer to the Eastern Front. Although only approximately two fighter wings remained in the west for the next year and a half, many of the best fighter crews remained in that theatre. Similarly, the best equipment went to the west; industry supplied the Focke-Wulf Fw 190 to the western theatre first. Small in numbers (no more than 180 aircraft), the western fighter forces were among the best in the Luftwaffe.

Now, promoted to Oberstleutnant, he continued to lead JG 26 in 1941 against the RAF fighter sweeps across northern Europe. In early 1941, most of the Luftwaffe's fighter units were sent to the Eastern Front, or south to the Mediterranean Theater of Operations (MTO), leaving only JG 26 and JG 2 as the sole single-engine fighter Geschwader in France. By this time, JG 26 were being re-equipped with the new Bf 109F, normally equipped with a 15 mm (or later a 20 mm) cannon firing through the propeller hub and two cowl-mounted 7.9 mm MG 17. Galland felt the model was grossly under-armed and so tested a series of 109 "specials" – one with a unique armament of an MG 151/20 cannon and two cowl-mounted 13 mm MG 131 machine guns, and another with integral wing-mounted 20 mm MG FF cannons.

On 15 April 1941, Galland took off with lobster and champagne to celebrate General Theo Osterkamp's birthday at Le Touquet, France. He made a detour with his wingman towards England, looking for RAF aircraft. Off the cliffs of Dover, he spotted a group of Spitfires. Galland attacked and claimed two confirmed and one unconfirmed shot down. The actual result was the destruction of one Spitfire; the other two were damaged in forced landings with both pilots wounded. During the combat, Galland's undercarriage had dropped causing one of the RAF pilots (Flight Lieutenant Paddy Finucane) to claim Galland's aircraft as destroyed, but Galland landed without incident at Le Touquet and presented Osterkamp with his gifts. Galland's success that day represented his 60th and 61st aerial victory.

Galland received a telephone call from Göring on 10 May 1941, requesting Galland to intercept a Messerschmitt Bf 110 flown by Rudolf Hess heading for Scotland. Galland was unable to launch a full fighter sweep. However, Hess' flight was far to the north and he reached Scotland crashing his aircraft. Galland sent out fighters to conduct some sweeps so he could honestly claim to have carried out his orders but it was nearly dark and Galland ordered his pilots unused to night flying to stand down.

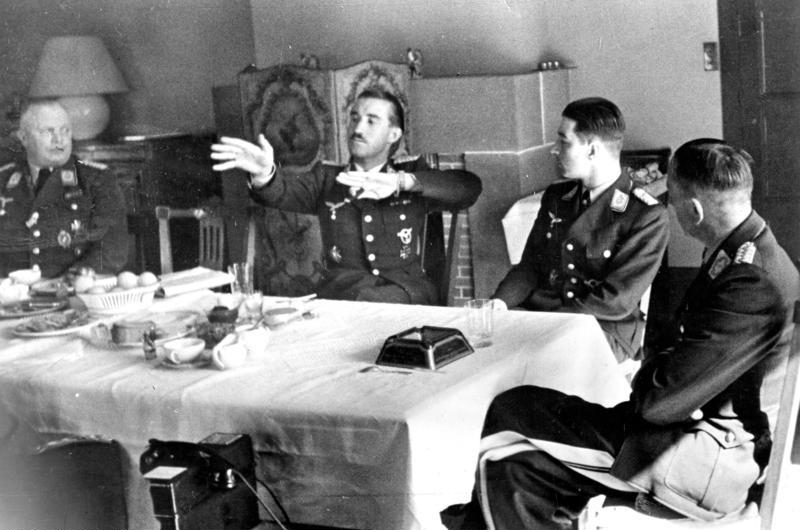
Galland and Werner Mölders attending Theo Osterkamp's birthday in April 1941.

Galland continued his successes in the summer. On 13 June, he led a small number of Bf 109s on a patrol off the English coast and attacked a pair of No. 258 Squadron RAF Hurricanes claiming both shot down. One can be confirmed through British records as crash landing at RAF Hawkinge. It took his tally to 63. From this point on, the RAF mounted a non-stop offensive with Fighter Command over France. The Germans did not see the point in these operations and soon labeled it the "nonsense offensive." Galland intended to engage the British and inflict maximum damage while incurring small losses. To do this he only engaged JG 26 in Staffel or Gruppe strength. The fighters were to scramble quickly, gain height and make use of the sun and cloud to attack the enemy formation that was most vulnerable. Under these tactics many JG 26 pilots began to emerge as aces and effective commanders. On 16 June 1941, for example, JG 26 accounted for 15 enemy aircraft. Josef Priller was among those to score bringing his tally to 22. Priller later rose to command JG 26. Galland claimed a Hurricane this day for victory number 64—though the loss cannot be confirmed in British records. On 17 June, he accounted for two Hurricanes, one from 56 and another from 242 Squadron. The following day he accounted for a No. 145 Squadron Spitfire which inflated his tally to 67—then the highest recorded tally against the Western Allies.

On the morning of 21 June, he accounted for two Bristol Blenheims but was shot down by the Spitfire escorts, crash-landing near Calais. At 16:00 that same afternoon, Galland shot down a No. 611 Squadron Spitfire, but watching his victim for too long, he was himself shot down in Werknummer (Factory number) 6713, code "<- + -", by a 145 Squadron Spitfire flown by Sergeant R.J.C. Grant. Galland bailed out and tugged at what he thought was his parachute ripcord, but was actually pulling at his parachute release harness. With a "sickening" feeling, he composed himself and pulled the ripcord which opened. Theo Osterkamp drove over to the hospital where Galland was being treated for his wounds and informed him his 69 victories had now earned him the Knight's Cross of the Iron Cross with Oak Leaves and Swords (Ritterkreuz des Eisernen Kreuzes mit Eichenlaub und Schwertern).

On 2 July 1941, Galland led JG 26 into combat against a formation of No. 226 Squadron Blenheim bombers. Galland's fighter was hit by a 20 mm round from one of the bombers escort fighters. The armour plate fitted to the Bf 109 just days earlier saved Galland's life. Wounded in the head he managed to land and was again hospitalised for the second time in a few days. Just earlier that week, when the armour plate was installed, he severely berated his mechanic, Gerhard Meyer, who welded it in, when he hit his head on the canopy upon entering his aircraft. That same mechanic received "a grateful slap on the back". Galland had been shot up and shot down twice in the space of four days. The Blenheim brought his tally to 70.

On 9 August 1941, RAF ace Douglas Bader bailed out over St Omer, France. Bader was well known to the Luftwaffe and at the time of his capture had been credited with 22 aerial victories. Galland himself claimed two Spitfires on that date. Galland and JG 26 entertained Bader over the next few days. Owing to the significant stature of the prisoner, Galland permitted Bader, under escort, to sit in the cockpit of a Bf 109. Apparently, despite having lost one of his tin legs in the aircraft, Bader, in a semi-serious way, asked if they wouldn't mind if he took it on a test flight around the airfield. Galland replied that he feared Douglas would attempt to escape and they would have to give chase and shoot at each other again, and declined the request.

Throughout the summer, Galland claimed another 14 Spitfires in battles against Fighter Command over France. On 23 July 1941, he accounted for three Spitfires (Nos. 71–73)—one in the afternoon and two in the evening. JG 26 claimed 13 enemies for three losses under Galland's command this day. Two on 7 August was sufficient to reach 75 aerial victories. On 19 August, he claimed two Spitfires and one Hurricane to surpass the World War I ace Manfred von Richthofen's tally of 80. His 80th and 81st victims were from 111 and 71 Squadrons. Galland also flew the Focke-Wulf Fw 190 in the autumn 1941 when the Geschwader converted to the type though he retained and flew Bf 109s himself. On 21 October he repeated his successes with a trio of Spitfires to reach 92. Galland's opponents were No. 611 Squadron Pilot Officers J F Reeves and N J Smith. Both men were killed, but Fighter Command reported their demise as a collision with each other during the dogfight.

His 96th victim—yet another Spitfire—was claimed on 18 November 1941. It proved to be his last official victory for three years as he was about to be forbidden to fly combat missions. The RAF fighter probably came from 611 Squadron.

== High command (1941–1945) ==
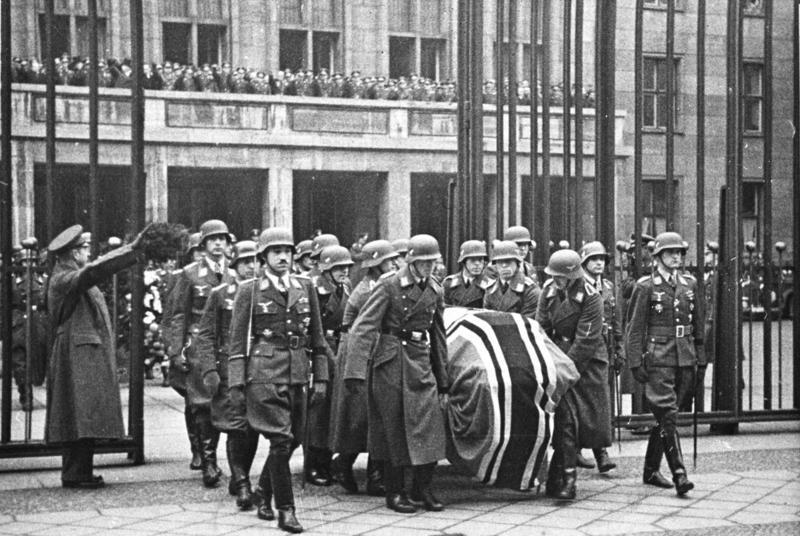
Galland (front honour guard, left) at Ernst Udet's funeral

In November 1941, he was chosen by Göring to command Germany's fighter force as General der Jagdflieger, succeeding Werner Mölders who had just been killed in an air crash en route to attend the funeral of Ernst Udet. Galland was not enthusiastic about his promotion, seeing himself as a combat leader and not wanting to be "tied to a desk job". He was the youngest General in the armed forces.

Soon afterward, on 28 January 1942, Galland was awarded the Knight's Cross of the Iron Cross with Oak Leaves, Swords and Diamonds (Ritterkreuz des Eisernen Kreuzes mit Eichenlaub, Schwertern und Brillanten) for his service as Geschwaderkommodore of JG 26. Although not keen on a staff position, soon after Galland's appointment, he planned and executed the German air superiority plan (Operation Donnerkeil) for the Kriegsmarine's (German navy, or War Marine) Operation Cerberus, from his headquarters at Jever. The German battleships Scharnhorst, Gneisenau and heavy cruiser Prinz Eugen sailed from Brest, France, up the English Channel to Kiel, Germany. The operation caught the British off guard. The RAF attempted to intercept with the forces available, but the German fighter defences were able to shoot down 43 RAF aircraft with 247 British casualties. The Luftwaffe had prevented any damage on the ships by air attack.

A strong proponent of the day fighter force and the defence of Germany, Galland used his position to improve the position of the Jagdwaffe. The need was now pressing, as Germany had declared war on the United States on 11 December 1941, and Galland was keen to build up a force that could withstand the resurgence of the Western Allied Air Forces in preparation for what became known as the Defence of the Reich campaign. Galland was outspoken, something that was not often tolerated by Göring. Yet, by earning and cultivating the support of other powerful personalities in the Luftwaffe, like Erhard Milch and Günther Korten, and personalities in the industrial sector such as Albert Speer and even Adolf Hitler, Galland was able to survive in his position for three years.

The Circus offensive of Fighter Command, now magnified by USAAF fighters in large numbers, had combined with Eighth Air Force's bomber operations to make Western Europe the critical theatre of air operations by the late summer, 1943. Neither Göring nor many of his commanders expected this development. In January 1943 Göring suggested increases in the day fighter forces, but not because of concerns over Allied aircraft production, rather the emphasis was on fighters for the fighter-bomber mission. Galland, who was pushing for a major increase in his fighter force, did not appear to recognise the threat in the west at that time either. In January, he wrongly predicted that the main weight of the air war in 1943 would be the Mediterranean. The large fighter forces sent to Africa and Italy received support from Galland. Galland remarked in February 1943, that the fighter force had solved the problem of fighting four-engine bombers by day. Galland's confidence was misplaced; his airmen had not yet faced the hundreds of American bombers to fly over Germany in 1943, nor the thousands that joined the fight in 1944. Months later, Galland became one of the strongest advocates for more resources for Defence of the Reich duties.

=== Mediterranean ===
The first major crisis for Galland's command, under his tenure, occurred in 1943. Galland had been supporting operations in the area since April 1943, but the Tunisian defeat caused a reorganisation of Axis air forces in the south. Luftflotte 2 was divided in two, with Luftflotte South East controlling the Balkans and a new Luftflotte 2 controlling Italy, Sardinia, Corsica, and Sicily. A general replacement of commanders also occurred. Wolfram von Richthofen arrived as Luftflotte 2 commander. Galland, went to Sicily to control fighter operations.

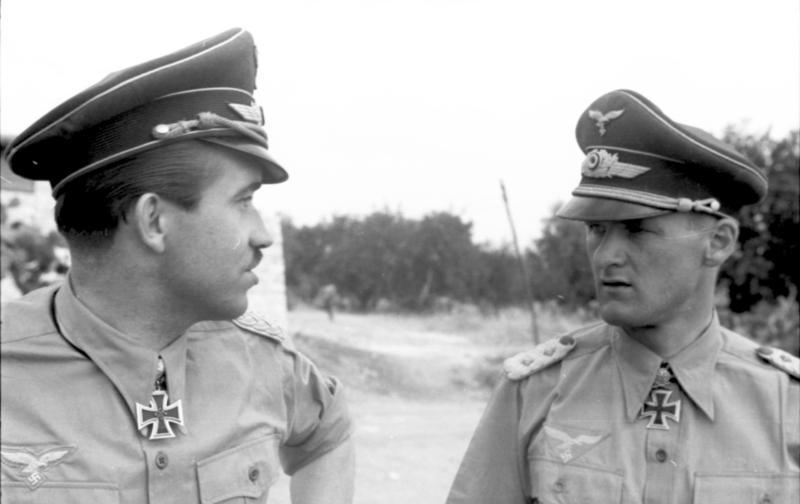
Adolf Galland and Günther Lützow in Italy

Galland's orders were to improve efficiency, morale and the supply of aircraft and pilots. Galland replaced the experienced Osterkamp as JaFü Sizilien (Fighter Leader Sicily) on 22 June after he had appointed his close associate Günther Lützow as Inspekteur der Jadgflieger Süd (Inspector of Fighter Pilots South) on 17 May. The challenge of a combat command was too tempting and Galland was not to prove a capable senior staff officer. Galland's failings delighted Richthofen who was content to allow Galland "enough rope to hang himself", which deflected attention from others.

Upon reaching the island, Galland found the state of German air forces shocking. The combat units were exhausted, short of spares, and under frequent attack—the 130 fighters on the island were the target. It was impossible to completely rebuild the squadrons. The resources available could not prevent the Allied air forces acting with impunity. Göring threatened to have one pilot from each unit stand trial by court martial, and if improvements were not forthcoming, they were to be sent as infantry to the Eastern Front. The commanders on the ground, recognising the true situation, disregarded the threat and the message. Specifically, Göring ordered pilots returning without claims and undamaged aircraft suffer court martial for cowardice. The threat was aimed at JG 77, which at the time was severely stretched. Galland parroted Göring's criticism. Under pressure from Göring, he also berated the wing which caused friction with the commanding officer Johannes Steinhoff.

Along with these changes, considerable reinforcements arrived. The number of fighters increased from 190 in mid-May to 450 in early July 1943. Close to 40 percent of all fighter production from 1 May to 15 July 1943 went to the Mediterranean Theatre and two new fighter wings, scheduled for Germany's defence, went south. The movement of fighters to redress Allied air superiority achieved only a rise in German losses, which reflected the superiority of Allied production. From 16 May to 9 July Allied forces flew 42,147 sorties and lost 250 aircraft to the Axis' 325 as the air offensive gradually rendered airfields in Sicily inoperable. The weak German bomber force made only a feeble attempt to support the defence of Sicily.

Losses too were high. In the first nine days of July 1943, Galland's command lost approximately 70 fighters. On the fourteenth day he was summoned to Berlin to explain the collapse of air defences on the island. As Galland departed the last dozen operational Axis aircraft departed Sicily on 22 July. Since the Allied invasion of Sicily, Galland had lost 273 German and 115 Italian aircraft and imposed a cost of only around 100 on Allied air forces.

=== Conflict with Göring and failed leadership ===
Galland's position as General der Jagdflieger brought him into gradual conflict with Göring as the war continued. Galland was often at odds with Göring and Hitler on how to prosecute the air war. From 1942 to 1944, the German fighter forces on all fronts in the European Theatre of Operations (ETO) came under increasing pressure and Galland's relationship with Göring began to turn sour. The first distinct cracks began to appear in the spring of 1943. Galland suggested that the fighter forces defending Germany should limit the number of interceptions flown to allow sufficient time for re-grouping and to conserve air strength. Only by conserving its strength and its precious resources—the fighter pilots—could the Luftwaffe hope to inflict damage on the bombers. Göring found the suggestion unacceptable. He demanded every raid be countered in maximum strength regardless of the size of the Allied fighter escort. According to head of production and procurement Erhard Milch, who was also present at the meeting, "Göring just could not grasp it".

The combination of declining production and attrition left Galland with a thin resource-base with which to defend Germany. While the pressure eased somewhat in November, Galland and his command faced a formidable threat. The shadow of American escort fighters and the gradual extension of their range covered all of the zones occupied by German fighter units engaged in anti-bomber operations. By early October, German intelligence had reported that American fighters were accompanying bombers as far as Hamburg.

Several American fighter aircraft crashed near Aachen on the cusp of Germany's west border. Galland presented these wrecks as proof that the Luftwaffe was facing an enemy that could soon escort its heavy bombers with fighter aircraft to industrial targets inside Germany. Galland submitted his findings to Göring. Göring was livid with Galland and the fighter force. He called the report the "rantings of a worn-out defeatist", and gave Galland an "order", that no Allied fighters had crossed into Germany. Göring reasoned the only possible reason could have been that short range fighters ran out of fuel at high altitude and "they were shot down much further west... and glided quite a distance before they crashed." Galland questioned why an Allied pilot would choose to glide east instead of west. Both men also argued that they must increase fighter production to reach a three or fourfold advantage over the attackers immediately to prepare for this new threat. Göring even at this time, was biased in favour of bombers, to maintain the offensive on all fronts. It was a policy he persisted with until the autumn, 1943.

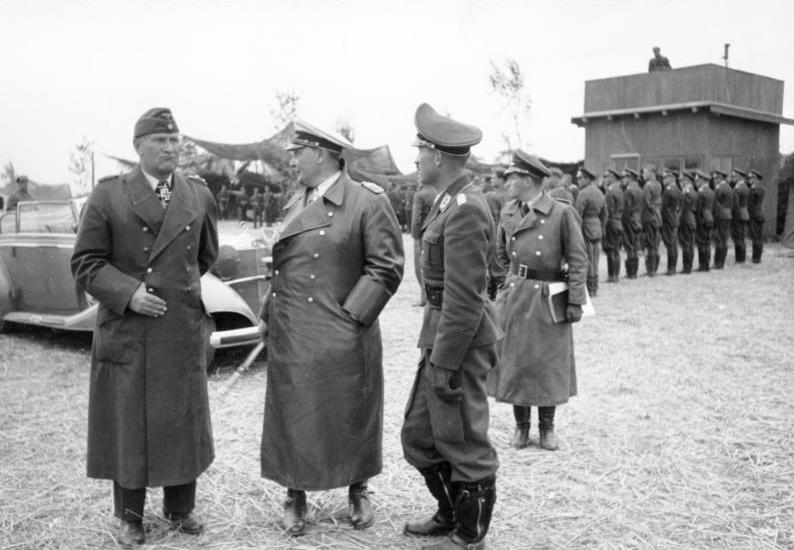
Bruno Loerzer (left), Galland (right) and Hermann Göring (centre), September 1940

By October 1943, the fractious relationship came to the surface again. Galland met with Göring at Göring's estate, Schloss Veldenstein. During the conversation the need for new and improved interceptor aircraft arose. Göring, demanded heavily cannon-armed fighters be used en masse. Göring, prompted by the desires of Hitler, wanted cannons of some 900 kilograms (2,000 lb) in weight. Galland explained that such a weapon could not be used effectively in an aircraft; the cannon would be prone to jamming and the aircraft would be too difficult to manoeuvre. Galland also asserted the use of inappropriate weaponry such as the Messerschmitt Me 410, a favourite of Hitler's, had caused heavy losses. Galland argued such measures were deplorable and irresponsible. Göring disregarded Galland's arguments and continued his frequent attacks on the fighter force, accusing them of cowardice. Galland, as he always did, defended them, risking his career and, near the end of the war, his life in doing so. Galland stated that he could not agree to follow Göring's plans and requested to be dismissed from his post and sent back to his unit. Göring accepted, but two weeks later he apologised to Galland and attributed his behaviour to stress. Galland continued in his post.

Nonetheless, the arguments ultimately continued, mainly over aircraft procurement and armament for the defence of Germany from Allied bombing, and began to give rise to a growing personal rift between Göring and Galland. In November 1943 Galland issued a communique to the fighter forces, announcing the introduction of new weapons, such as heavily armed Fw 190s, to engage of destroy Allied bombers through the use of massed and formation-based attack tactics at close range. He also passed on Göring's dissatisfaction with wing and squadron commanders that did not press their attacks in this manner. For the first time, Göring ordered his units, through Galland, to use ramming methods, and risk sacrificing the pilot. It was not the first occasion Galland had ordered this; the General demanded the same from his men during the Channel Dash operation in 1942.

Galland found the appearance of American fighters at this range alarming. German losses were so heavy that Galland held a special meeting with I Jagdkorps division commanders on 4 November 1943. Contributing to the day fighter losses was the fact that many German fighters did not possess direction finders to locate their bases in bad weather. It was decided the single-engine fighters must engage in protecting the heavier fighters, such as the Messerschmitt Bf 110, from escorts, so the latter could attack the bombers. The only available unit to protect the heavy fighters was Jagdgeschwader 300 (JG 300), with heavily armed but slow variants of the Fw 190. At the end of December, Galland and the staff of Jagdkorps I concluded that their new tactics had failed with high losses. The causes were "(a) the weather, (b) the considerable inferiority of German strength, (c) the impossibility of gathering sufficient strength in an area because of time and distance limitations; result : weak and dispersed fighter attack."

The situation deteriorated in February 1944, with Big Week, as the Combined Bomber Offensive gathered momentum. In mid-March 1944, shortages of skilled pilots caused Galland to send the following message asking for volunteers:

The strained manpower situation in units operating in Defence of the Reich demands urgently the further bringing up of experienced flying personnel from other arms of the service, in particular for the maintenance of fighting power to the air arm, tried pilots of the ground attack and bomber units, especially officers suitable as formation leaders, will now also have to be drawn on.

The plea was desperate. By the end of March, the daylight strategic bombing offensive had put the Luftwaffe under enormous pressure. It retarded, although only for a short period, the expansion of fighter production. Importantly, it had caused devastating attrition. American air forces continued unrelenting pressure for the duration of the war. There was no hope of a recovery for Germany's daylight fighter forces under Galland's command and the Allied air forces were close to winning air superiority over all of Europe. A conference between Galland and Göring in mid-May 1944 underlined how enemy air operations were devastating the fighter force. Galland reported that Luftflotte Reich had lost 38 percent of its fighter pilots in April 1944, while Luftflotte 3 had lost 24 percent.

Altogether, the Germans had lost 489 pilots (100 officers), Galland reported, while training centres had forwarded only 396 new pilots (including 62 officers). Galland's proposals to meet the shortfall and attrition reflected the desperate situation. Galland urged all fighter pilots holding short staff positions be transferred immediately to operational units, that qualified night fighter pilots transfer to the day fighter force, that two fighter groups transfer from the eastern front as soon as possible, and that the ground attack command release all pilots with more than five aerial victories to the defence of the Reich. Finally, Galland reported that flying schools had released 80-plus instructors. Galland took this step even though he was critical of the high command for failing to produce a long-term plan for higher numbers of instructors in schools, particularly after production increased the number of aircraft available.

=== Innovations ===
On 23 May 1943, Galland flew an early prototype of the Messerschmitt Me 262 jet fighter. After the flight, he described his experience; "It was as though angels were pushing." Galland became an enthusiastic supporter of the aircraft, realising its potential as a fighter rather than a bomber. Galland hoped that the Me 262 would compensate for the numerical superiority of the Allies. In a wartime report he wrote:

In the last four months [January–April 1944] our day fighters have lost 1,000 pilots...we are numerically inferior and will always remain so...I believe that a great deal can be achieved with a small number of technically and far superior aircraft such as the [Me] 262 and [Me] 163... I would at this moment rather have one Me 262 in action rather than five Bf 109s. I used to say three 109s, but the situation develops and changes.

Galland's enthusiasm failed to appreciate the difficulties involved in transferring a design into production, especially under the circumstances. The Me 262 was not Willy Messerschmitt's priority. The designer was involved in a battle with Milch from 1942 over the cancellation of the Messerschmitt Me 209 in favour of the jet. There were also problems with the engines and series production was difficult because the company were making design changes at the same time they were working up production lines.

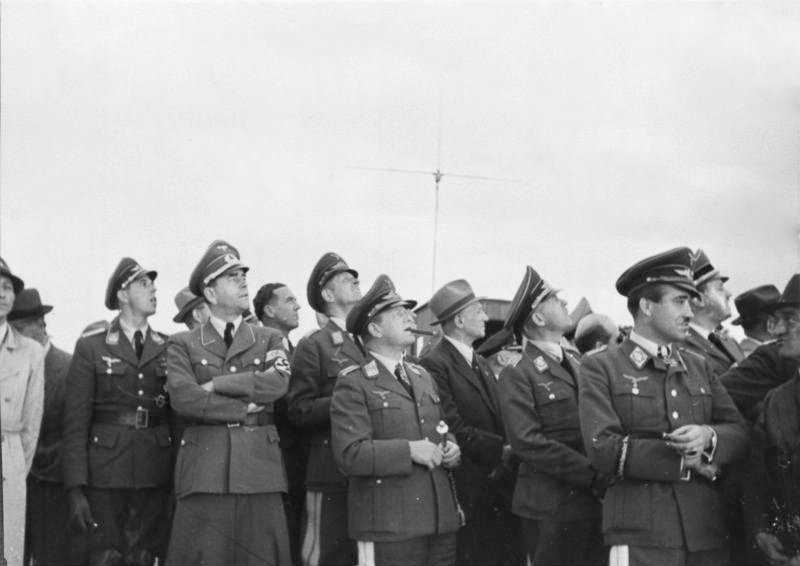
Galland (right) with Erhard Milch (centre) and Speer (left) at the Erprobungsstelle Rechlin central test airfield, inspecting new aircraft types

Galland succeeded in temporarily persuading Milch to support cancelling the Me 209 program in favour of producing 100 Me 262s by the end of 1943. However, because of persistent problems with its turbojet engines and later, Hitler's determination to use it as a bomber, the Me 262 was not developed as a fighter until late in the war.

By spring 1944, the Me 262 was sufficiently ready for operational service. By this time, Galland faced rivalries amongst the Luftwaffe command over how best to employ the aircraft. Dietrich Peltz, commander of the IX. Fliegerkorps (9th Air Corps), wanted to use the aircraft as a weapon against a future Allied landing in France. Peltz saw the aircraft as an ideal fast bomber which could evade the overwhelming numbers of Allied piston-engine fighters and attack the landing grounds. Peltz also wished to use highly trained bomber pilots who he felt could better serve as home defence fighter pilots in place of the overextended and overworked Jagdwaffe. Their blind-weather experience and training, and background in multi-engine aircraft made them ideal for these operations in his view.

In the first five months of 1944, Peltz' conventional bomber force had suffered a significant defeat over England in Operation Steinbock but it did not dull his appetite for offensive action or dent his reputation with Göring. Galland argued against his suggestion. Instead, Galland thought the bomber corps should be disbanded and its pilots converted onto fighters. Göring adopted Peltz' idea to impress Hitler and regain his waning influence.

Galland did not give up. He made repeated appeals for Me 262 fighter aircraft. Göring refused Galland's requests to have equal numbers of Me 262 fighter and bomber variants built. However, Galland's close relationship with Albert Speer, the German armaments minister, enabled him to retain a small operational number. Even this was difficult, as Hitler had taken personal control of turbo-jet production and checked where each batch of the aircraft were being deployed.

It was not until September 1944 that Hitler rescinded his directive that the Me 262 be used as a fighter-bomber. Galland had earlier ignored the order and formed Eprobungskommando 262 to test the Me 262 against high-flying Allied reconnaissance aircraft. He selected the highly decorated pilot Werner Thierfelder as its commander. Hitler heard of the experiment through Milch and ordered Göring to put a stop to it at a meeting on 29 May 1944. Galland persisted with the experiments and ordered operations to be continued. They achieved isolated successes until Thierfelder was shot down and killed by P-51 Mustangs on 18 July 1944. On 20 August, Hitler finally agreed to allow one in every 20 Me 262 to go into service with the Jagdwaffe which allowed Galland to build all–jet units.

Galland closely followed Kommando Nowotny, the experimental all-jet fighter unit. The unit struggled into November 1944 without much success and high losses. Galland visited the base near Achmer on 7 November to observe this only jet unit. On 8 November 1944, he was present when ace Walter Nowotny took off with a force of Me 262s in an overcast to engage a USAAF raid. Galland listened over the radio then watched as Nowotny's aircraft dived from out of the clouds and crashed into the ground; an apparent victim of American escorting fighters.

Galland remained ambivalent about other types. He was initially sceptical about the design concept in the Heinkel He 162. Göring forced the program along, the hour was desperate and all designs were to be explored. Galland was concerned about dispersing production effort further but apparently changed his mind after viewing a mockup on 7 October 1944 and the seeing the prototype fly in December. He demanded wooden mockups be made for ground instruction while three percent were to serve as trainers.

In the meantime, Galland pursued innovations with existing designs. The Focke-Wulf Fw 190 aircraft was formed into several Geschwader with distinctly upgraded firepower. Called the Sturmbock (Battering ram), these machines could inflict heavy damage on unescorted bomber formations. Galland supported the conversion of units such as JG 300 to the Sturmbock role. The Sturmbock were heavily armed and armoured, which meant they were un-manoeuvrable and vulnerable without protection from escorting Bf 109s. Still, the tactics quickly became widespread and were one of the few Luftwaffe success stories in 1944. Galland said after the war, that had it not been for the Allied landing in Normandy which increased the need for lighter fighter variants, each Geschwader in the Luftwaffe would have contained a Gruppe of Sturmbock aircraft by September 1944.

Galland himself flew on unauthorised interception flights to experience the combat pressures of the pilots and witnessed USAAF bombers being escorted by large numbers of P-51 Mustangs. Nevertheless, on occasions the Sturmbock tactics worked. For example, on 7 July 1944 Eighth Air Force bombers belonging to the 492nd Bomb Group were intercepted unescorted. The entire squadron of 12 B-24s were shot down. The USAAF 2nd Air Division lost 28 Liberators that day, the majority to a Sturmbock attack.

=== Dismissal and revolt ===
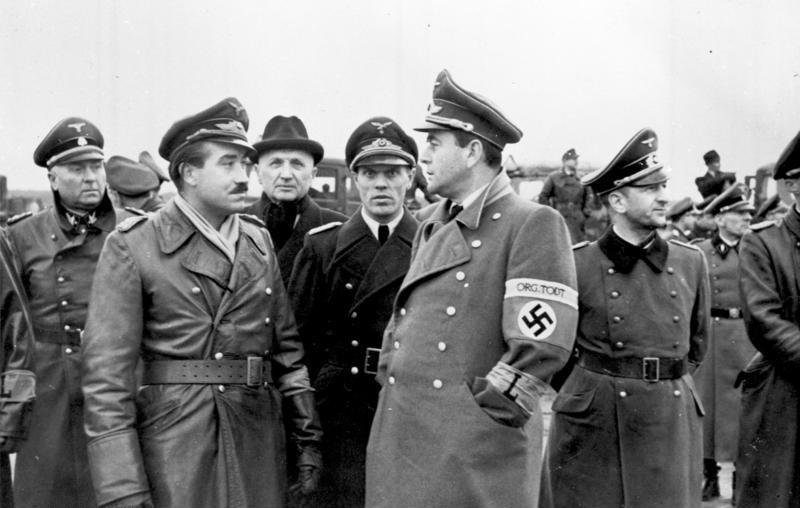
Galland and Albert Speer. The two men had a mutual respect.

Despite Göring's apology after their previous dispute, the relationship between the two men did not improve. Göring's influence was in decline by late 1944 and he had fallen out of favour with Hitler. Göring became increasingly hostile to Galland, blaming him and the fighter pilots for the situation. In 1944, the situation worsened. A series of USAAF raids termed Big Week won air superiority for the Allies in February. By the spring of 1944, the Luftwaffe could not effectively challenge the Allies over France or the Low Countries. Operation Overlord, the Allied invasion of German-occupied Europe took place in June 1944. According to a report made by Galland, in the previous four months 1,000 pilots had been killed. Galland reported that the enemy outnumbered his fighters between 6:1 and 8:1 and the standard of Allied fighter pilot training was "astonishingly high".

To win back some breathing space for his force and German industrial targets, Galland formulated a plan which he called the "Big Blow" (German: Großer Schlag). It called for the mass interception of USAAF bomber formations by approximately 2,000 German fighters. Galland hoped that the German fighters would shoot down some 400–500 bombers. Acceptable losses were to be around 400 fighters and 100–150 pilots. Galland's staff could muster 3,700 aircraft of all types by 12 November 1944, with 2,500 retained for this specific operation. The night fighter force was to assist by employing 100 aircraft in southern and northern Germany, to prevent any crippled bombers making it to Switzerland and Sweden. Over the autumn 1944 Galland carefully husbanded his resources and waited for unusually bad weather to improve.

Hitler rejected Galland's plan. He hoped to improve Germany's position by winning a decisive victory on the Western Front. Hitler distrusted Galland's theory and believed him to be afraid and stalling for time. The Führer was also skeptical that the Luftwaffe could stop the American air offensive and was not willing to have German resources sit idle on airfields to wait for an improvement in flying conditions. Admittedly Galland's efforts had built up a useful reserve, but Hitler was now to use it in support of a land offensive. Göring and Hitler handed over the forces pooled by Galland to Peltz whom they had appointed commander of II. Jagdkorps—responsible for virtually all fighter forces in the west. Peltz appointed Gordon Gollob as Special Fighter Staff Officer for the offensive. Gollob ultimately was a vociferous opponent of Galland and eventually engineered his dismissal. Whether the "Big Blow" operation would have worked is a matter of academic debate. Historians remained divided, with some believing it was a lost opportunity while others think it would have had much less impact than Galland estimated.

The operation never took place. Instead, the fighter force was committed to the disastrous Operation Bodenplatte, designed to support German forces during the Battle of the Bulge. Galland's influence on matters was now virtually nil. Appalled by the Ardennes losses, he personally confronted Gollob and criticised him severely. Gollob contacted the Reichsführer-SS Heinrich Himmler. Himmler's reputation as the most powerful man after Hitler at that time may have been a prime motive. Gollob complained about his misuse in the Luftwaffe and Galland's leadership. The SS had already spread their influence into other areas of military affairs including the V-2 operations. Himmler, whose relationship with Göring was poor, took the opportunity to exploit the dissent in the Luftwaffe and undermine the Reichsmarschall by supporting Gollob. It was also an opportunity for the SS to seize control of the Luftwaffe and for Himmler to oust Göring from power. Göring, for his part offered no support to Galland when Himmler or the SS were mentioned. On 13 January 1945, Galland was finally relieved of his command.

On 17 January, a group of senior pilots took part in a "Fighter Pilots Revolt". Galland's high standing with his fighter pilot peers led to a group of the most decorated Luftwaffe combat leaders loyal to Galland (including Johannes Steinhoff and Günther Lützow) confronting Göring with a list of demands for the survival of their service. Göring initially suspected Galland had instigated the unrest. Heinrich Himmler had wanted to put Galland on trial for treason himself; the SS and Gestapo had already begun investigations into who he associated with. The Oberkommando der Luftwaffe (OKL) appointed the more politically acceptable Gollob, a National Socialist supporter, to succeed him as General der Jagdflieger on 23 January. Although professional contemporaries, Gollob and Galland had a mutual dislike, and after Galland had removed the Austrian from his personal staff in September 1944, Gollob started to gather evidence to use against Galland, detailing false accusations of his gambling, womanising, and alleged private use of Luftwaffe transport aircraft. The official reason for his being relieved of command was his ill health. Göring suspected Galland of organising the rebellion and wanted all the ringleaders to face court-martial.

For his own safety, Galland went to a retreat in the Harz Mountains. He was to keep the RLM informed of his whereabouts but was effectively under house arrest. Hitler, who liked Galland, learned of the revolt and ordered that "all this nonsense" was to stop immediately. Hitler had been informed by Albert Speer, who in turn had been notified by one of Galland's close friends. After Hitler's intervention Göring contacted Galland and invited him to Karinhall. In light of his service to the fighter arm, he promised no further action would be taken against him and offered command of a unit of Me 262 jets. Galland accepted on the understanding that Gollob had no jurisdiction over him or his unit.

=== Self appraisal ===
Galland did not pretend to have been error free. After the war, he was candid about his own mistakes as General der Jagdflieger. Production and aircraft procurement were not his responsibility, but Galland identified four major mistakes by the OKL during the war, and accepted partial responsibility for the first three:

- Fighter pilots received no instrument training until very late in the war, after the training course had already been curtailed because of fuel shortages and the need to produce pilots more quickly to replace losses. Galland also did not make sure all-weather flying was incorporated into pilot training, which was of decisive importance in an effective air defence force.
- Attrition by 1942 had created a shortage of experienced combat leaders. No special training was made available for this role. Galland set up a course in late 1943, but it only lasted for a few months. Galland was quoted as saying he thought they could learn the skills while on operations, as he had. This ignored his own talents, and blithely expected other pilots to reach his high standards.
- The Me 262, while not a war winner, might have extended the Defence of the Reich campaign. The problems with the engines, failures of production priorities and Hitler's meddling are well known, but the long delay between operational testing, tactical and doctrinal development and training were largely Galland's fault.
- The German pilots were increasingly lacking in quantity and quality. Galland recognised this but could not correct it without stepping outside his own authority. Galland noticed that the highly educated engineers and trainees were selected for the bomber arm in the early war years. Most of the brightest youth were pulled by expert campaigners, toward the Waffen SS and Kriegsmarine. The Luftwaffe did not match this effort.

=== Unofficial combat missions ===
After his appointment, Galland was strictly confined to operational matters and not allowed to fly tactical or combat missions. As the war continued Galland flew missions in violation of these restrictions against the United States Army Air Forces (USAAF) bombing raids during the Defence of the Reich. Galland was keen to familiarise himself with all types of German fighter aircraft and flew the Fw 190 on these interception missions. He actively engaged American bombers on some raids. On at least one mission, he shot down a USAAF heavy bomber. It is possible that as many as three USAAF heavy bombers were shot down by Galland while he was flying Fw 190s.

== Return to front line service ==
Galland was initially assigned to command a Staffel of Jagdgeschwader 54, at that time stranded behind Soviet lines in the Courland Pocket. Galland never took up this command but was given the task of creating Jagdverband 44 (JV 44). On 24 February 1945 the order for its formation read:

JV 44 is established at Brandenburg-Briest with immediate effect. Ground personnel are to be drawn from 16./JG 54, Factory Protection Unit 1 and III./EJG 2. The commander of this unit receives the disciplinary powers of a Divisional Commander as laid down in Luftwaffe Order 3/9.17. It is subordinated to Luftflotte Reich and comes under Luftgaukommando III (Berlin). Verband Galland is to have a provisional strength of sixteen operational Me 262s and fifteen pilots. [Signed] Generalleutnant Karl Koller, Chief of Staff of the Luftwaffe.

The unit was officially formed on 22 February 1945. Galland did everything he could to introduce the Me 262s to the wing as quickly as possible. Göring showed sympathy for Galland's efforts, which thus far had only 16 operational jets in February. General Josef Kammhuber was asked to assist Galland. Kampfgeschwader 51 (KG 51 or Bomber Wing 51), 6 and 27 were behind their training schedules on jets, and they were to hand over their pilots and Me 262s to Jagdgeschwader 7 and Kampfgeschwader 54. Galland added a suggestion that all experienced fighter pilots flying with Bf 109 or Fw 190 units should be made to join the Me 262 unit. If this could be done Galland believed he could get 150 jets in action against the USAAF fleets. The general chaos and impending collapse prevented his plans from being realised.

On 31 March 1945, Galland flew 12 operational jets to Munich to begin operations. On 5 April, he organised the interception of a USAAF raid. The Me 262s destroyed three B-17s. On 16 April Galland claimed two Martin B-26 Marauder bombers shot down. On 21 April, to his surprise, he was visited by Göring, which turned out to be the final time. Göring officially assigned Günther Lützow to him and confessed to Galland that his assertions about the Me 262 and the use of bomber pilots with experience as jet fighter pilots had been correct. He enquired about the progress of his unit with outspoken civility. As they parted, Göring said, "I envy you Galland, for going into action. I wish I were a few years younger and less bulky. If I were, I would gladly put myself under your command. It would be marvelous to have nothing to worry about but a good fight, like it was in the old days."

In the space of six days, Galland's friend, Steinhoff was badly burned in a crash on 18 April, and then, on 24 April, his friend Lützow was posted missing. On 21 April, Galland was credited with his 100th aerial victory, the 103rd and last Luftwaffe pilot to reach that total.

On 26 April, Galland, accompanied by Leo Schuhmacher and Otto Kammerdiener, claimed his 103rd and 104th aerial victories against B-26s which were escorted by the 27th Fighter Group and 50th Fighter Group. Galland again made a mistake; he stopped to make sure his second victory was going to crash and he was hit by a USAAF P-47 Thunderbolt piloted by James Finnegan. Galland nursed his crippled Me 262 to the airfield, only to find it was under attack by more P-47s. Galland landed under fire and abandoned his jet on the runway. The battle was his last operational mission. Soon afterwards, he was sent to hospital for a knee wound that he had sustained during that engagement. The Americans lost four B-26s and another six damaged. Two Me 262s were shot down; the other pilot also survived.

In the 1970s, a San Jose State University graduate student came across Galland's memoirs The First and the Last while researching USAAF records and matching them to German victory claims. He found that James Finnegan, a P-47 Thunderbolt pilot of the 50th Fighter Group, Ninth Air Force, had made a "probable" claim on 26 April 1945, the day of Galland's last mission. The details of the engagement matched. Galland and Finnegan met for the first time at an Air Force Association meeting in San Francisco in 1979.

=== Surrender ===
By late April, the war was effectively over. On 1 May 1945, Galland attempted to make contact with United States Army forces to negotiate the surrender of his unit. The act itself was dangerous. SS forces roamed the countryside and towns executing anyone who was considering capitulation. The Americans requested that Galland fly his unit and Me 262s to a USAAF controlled airfield. Galland declined citing poor weather and technical problems. In reality, Galland was not going to hand over Me 262 jets to the Americans. Galland had harboured the belief that the Western Alliance would soon be at war with the Soviet Union, and he wanted to join American forces and to use his unit in the coming war to free Germany from Communist occupation. Galland replied, making his whereabouts known to the Americans, and offering his surrender once they arrived at the Tegernsee hospital where he was being treated. Galland then ordered his unit, which had then moved to Salzburg and Innsbruck, to destroy their Me 262s. At the time of his surrender, Galland had filed claims for 104 Allied aircraft shot down. His claims included seven with the Me 262. (Note: For a list of Luftwaffe Jet aces, see List of German World War II jet aces.)

On 14 May 1945, Galland was flown to England and interrogated by RAF personnel about the Luftwaffe, its organisation, his role in it, and technical questions. Galland returned to Germany on 24 August and was imprisoned at Hohenpeissenberg. On 7 October, Galland was returned to England for further interrogation. He was eventually released on 28 April 1947.

== Post-war ==
=== Argentina ===
After Galland was released, he travelled to Schleswig-Holstein to join Baroness Gisela von Donner, an earlier acquaintance, on her estate and lived with her three children. During this time, Galland found work as a forestry worker. Galland began to hunt for the family and traded at the local markets to supplement meagre meat rations. Soon Galland rediscovered his love of flying. Kurt Tank, the designer of the Fw 190, requested that he go to his home in Minden to discuss a proposal. Tank had been asked to work for both the British and Russians, and had narrowly avoided being kidnapped by the latter. Tank, through a contact in Denmark, informed Galland about the possibility of the Argentinian Government employing him as a test pilot for Tank's new generation of fighters. Galland accepted and flew to Argentina. He settled with Gisela in Ciudad Jardín Lomas del Palomar, Buenos Aires. Galland enjoyed the slow life. His time there, aside from work commitments, was taken up with Gisela and the active Buenos Aires night life. Galland found South America a world away from post-war shortages of Germany. Soon, he took up gliding again.

In a professional capacity, Galland spoke fluent Spanish, which helped in his instruction of new pilots. During his time with the Argentine Air Force (FAA) he flew the British Gloster Meteor. Galland, mindful that it was a contemporary of the Me 262, commented that it was a fine aircraft. He claimed that if he could have fitted the Meteor engines to the Me 262 airframe he would have had the best fighter in the world. Galland continued training, lecturing and consulting for the FAA until 1955. During his later years in Argentina Galland returned to Europe to test fly new aircraft. While there, he teamed up with Eduard Neumann, the former Geschwaderkommodore of JG 27 and mentor of Hans-Joachim Marseille, "The Star of Africa". Neumann had joined Galland's staff in April 1943. They flew a Piaggio P.149 in an international air rally across Italy. The weather was appalling and seven aircraft crashed, taking two lives. Galland and Neumann came in second.

=== Return to Germany and alleged Nazi sympathies ===
For his services to Argentina, Galland was awarded a pilot's wings badge and the title of the Honorary Argentine Military Pilot. In 1955 Galland left South America. By that time, he had begun writing his autobiography, The First and the Last (Die Ersten und die Letzten), that was published in 1954 by Franz Schneekluth. It was a best-seller in 14 languages and sold three million copies. It was well received by the RAF and USAF.

Galland returned to Germany and was approached by Amt Blank, a commissioner for Chancellor Konrad Adenauer for the purpose of joining the new Bundeswehr now that West Germany was to join NATO as a military power. In 1955, General Nathan Twining, the chief of staff of the USAF, sent a secret telegram to General William H. Tunner, commander of United States Air Forces in Europe. Claiming Galland's alleged "strong neo-Nazi leanings", association with prominent neo-Nazis such as his former colleague Hans-Ulrich Rudel, and his known service to the Juan Perón government, which was not on good terms with the United States, Twining asked that Tunner communicate to the German government that although the United States made it clear the appointment was entirely the choice of the Germans, they disapproved of Galland for the position of Inspektor (chief of staff) to the German Air Force. According to a Military History Research Office researcher, it is possible that the Americans suspected that Galland's rapid promotions were due to his association with Hitler rather than his merits. It is not known how American concerns reached Germany and this was the only reported time that the American government intervened to prevent someone from joining the Bundeswehr. Other sources conflict with this, noting to his close post-war association with RAF aces Douglas Bader and Robert Stanford Tuck, allegedly of Jewish ancestry yet named godfather of Galland's son Andreas.

In the summer of 1957, Galland moved to Bonn and rented an office on Koblenzerstrasse and began his own aircraft consultancy there. Galland worked hard but continued flying, taking part in national air shows. In 1956, he was appointed honorary chairman of the Gemeinschaft der Jagdflieger, the Association of Fighter Pilots. Through this, he came into contact with contemporaries in Britain and America. In 1961, he joined the Gerling Group of Cologne who contracted Galland to help develop their aviation business. With business going well, he bought his own aircraft on his 50th birthday in 1962, a Beechcraft Bonanza which he named Die Dicke (Fatty).

In 1969, he served as technical adviser for the film Battle of Britain, in which the character Major Falke is based on Galland. Galland was upset about the director's decision not to use the real names. While making the film, Galland was joined by his friend Robert Stanford Tuck. Galland also threatened to withdraw at a planned sequence involving him giving a Nazi salute to Göring. Tuck also wrote into the producers, urging them to reconsider; at one point Galland brought his lawyer to Pinewood Studios. In 1973, Galland appeared in the British television documentary series The World at War, in episodes four and twelve, "Alone (May 1940 – May 1941)" and "Whirlwind: Bombing Germany (September 1939 – April 1944)".

Galland took part in many engagements throughout the 1960s and 1970s. In 1974, he was part of the remaining German General Staff that took part in the Operation Sea Lion wargame at Sandhurst in the United Kingdom, replicating the planned German invasion of Britain in 1940 (which the Germans abandoned after their failure in the Battle of Britain). In 1975, he was a guest at the RAF Museum Hendon, during the unveiling of the Battle of Britain Hall, where he was entertained by Prince Charles. In 1980, Galland's eyesight became too poor for him to fly and he retired as a pilot. However, he continued to attend numerous aviation events, to include being a periodic guest of the U.S. Air Force for their annual "Gathering of Eagles" program at the Air Command and Staff College at Maxwell AFB, Alabama, USA. On 16 October, he was reunited with two Merkel shotguns stolen by American soldiers after his capture in 1945. Galland had located them before and had tried to buy them back, only to be turned down, as they would be worth more after his death. Towards the end of the 1980s, Galland's health began to fail.

== Personal life and death ==
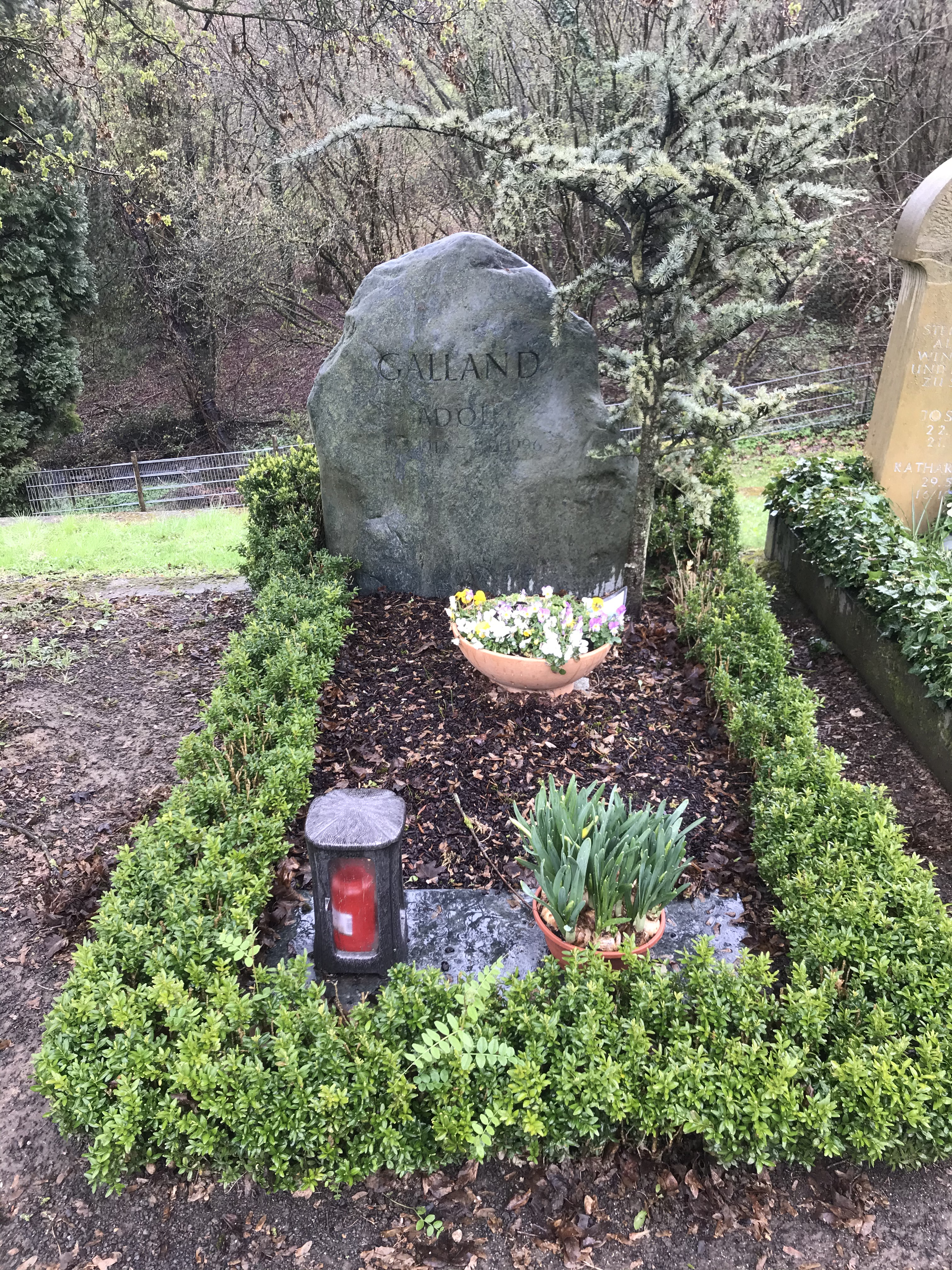
Grave in Oberwinter

Baroness Gisela von Donner refused to marry Galland as the restrictions imposed upon her by her former husband's will would have denied her the wealth and freedom she enjoyed were she to marry Galland. She left for Germany in 1954. Galland married Sylvinia von Dönhoff on 12 February 1954. (Note: Sylvinia von Dönhoff was the widow of Generalmajor Harald von Hirschfeld, killed in action on 18 January 1945.) However, she was unable to have children and they divorced on 10 September 1963.

On 10 September 1963, Galland married his secretary, Hannelies Ladwein. They had two children: a son, Andreas Hubertus (nicknamed "Andus") born 7 November 1966; and a daughter, Alexandra-Isabelle born 29 July 1969. The RAF ace Robert Stanford Tuck was the godfather of his son Andreas. Galland remained friends with Tuck until the latter's death on 5 May 1987. Galland felt his loss greatly. Galland's marriage to Hannelies did not last and on 10 February 1984, he married his third wife, Heidi Horn, who remained with him until his death.

By the 1980s, Galland was regularly attending the funerals of friends like Tuck, and also Douglas Bader, who had died on 5 September 1982 after speaking at a dinner for Arthur Harris. In January 1983, he attended the funeral of Gerhard Barkhorn and his wife Christl, who had died in a traffic accident.

In early February 1996, Galland was taken seriously ill. He had wanted to die at home and so was released from hospital and returned to his own house. With his wife Heidi, son and daughter present, he was given the last rites and died at 1:15 in the morning of Friday, 9 February 1996. His body was buried at the Cementerio in Oberwinter, district of Remagen, on 21 February. A memorial service was held on 31 March at the St. Laurentius Church.

== Summary of military career ==
=== Aerial victory claims ===
According to US historian David T. Zabecki, Galland was credited with 104 aerial victories. Spick also lists him with 104 aerial victories claimed in 425 combat missions, and a mission-to-claim ratio of 4.09. Mathews and Foreman, authors of Luftwaffe Aces – Biographies and Victory Claims, researched the German Federal Archives and found records for 100 aerial victory claims, plus nine further unconfirmed claims, all of which claimed on the Western Front. This figure of confirmed claims includes two four-engined bombers and six victories with the Me 262 jet fighter.

=== Awards ===
- Medal for the Campaign of 1936−1939 (Medalla de la Campaña 1936–1939 or Medalla de la Campaña, Spain)
- Military Medal (Spain) with Diamonds
- Spanish Cross in Gold with Swords and Diamonds (6 June 1939)
- Front Flying Clasp of the Luftwaffe in Gold with Pennant "400"
- Wound Badge in Black
- Pilot/Observer Badge in Gold with Diamonds (August 1940)
- Iron Cross (1939)
  - 2nd Class (13 September 1939)
  - 1st Class (22 May 1940)
- Knight's Cross of the Iron Cross with Oak Leaves, Swords and Diamonds
  - Knight's Cross on 29 July 1940 as Major and Gruppenkommandeur of the III./Jagdgeschwader 26 "Schlageter"
  - 3rd Oak Leaves on 24 September 1940 as Major and Geschwaderkommodore of Jagdgeschwader 26 "Schlageter"
  - 1st Swords (21 June 1941) as Oberstleutnant and Geschwaderkommodore of Jagdgeschwader 26 "Schlageter"
  - 2nd Diamonds (28 January 1942) as Oberst and Geschwaderkommodore of Jagdgeschwader 26 "Schlageter"

=== Promotions ===
1 October 1934:	Leutnant (Second Lieutenant)
1 October 1939:	Hauptmann (Captain)
18 July 1940:	Major (Major)
4 December 1941:	Oberst (Colonel)
19 November 1942:	Generalmajor (Brigadier General)
1 November 1944:	Generalleutnant (Major General)

== Notes ==
Military offices
Preceded by Major Gotthard Handrick	Commander of Jagdgeschwader 26 Schlageter; 22 August 1940 – 5 December 1941	Succeeded by Major Gerhard Schöpfel
Preceded by Oberst Werner Mölders	General der Jagdflieger; 5 December 1941 – 31 January 1945	Succeeded by Oberst Gordon Gollob
Preceded by Generalleutnant Theo Osterkamp	Commander of Jagdfliegerführer Sizilien; 15 June 1943 – 31 July 1943	Succeeded by Oberstleutnant Carl Vieck
Preceded by none	Commander of Jagdverband 44; 1 February 1945 – 26 April 1945	Succeeded by Oberst Heinrich Bär
