= Wilhelm-Ferdinand Galland =

German fighter ace and Knight's Cross recipient

- Born: 23 October 1914; Bochum, Kingdom of Prussia, German Empire
- Died: 17 August 1943 (aged 28) near Maastricht, German-occupied Netherlands
- Cause of death: Killed in action
- Burial place: Lommel, Belgium (Block 21-grave 290)
- Relatives: Adolf Galland; Paul Galland
- Military career
- Allegiance: Nazi Germany
- Branch: Luftwaffe
- Service years: 1935–1943
- Rank: Major (major)
- Nickname: Wutz
- Units: Flak-Lehr-Regiment; JG 26
- Commands: 5./JG 26, II./JG 26
- Conflicts: See battles World War II: Battle of France; Western Front; Dieppe Raid; Defense of the Reich; Schweinfurt–Regensburg mission †
- Awards: Knight's Cross of the Iron Cross

Wilhelm-Ferdinand "Wutz" Galland (23 October 1914 – 17 August 1943) was a German Luftwaffe military aviator and fighter ace during World War II. He is credited with 55 aerial victories achieved in 186 combat missions. All his victories were claimed over the Western Front and in Defense of the Reich. This figure included seven four-engine bombers and 37 Supermarine Spitfire fighters.

Born in Bochum, Galland grew up in the Weimar Republic and Nazi Germany. He joined the military service in the Wehrmacht in 1935, initially serving with the anti-aircraft artillery of the Luftwaffe. Upon his request in late 1940, he transferred to the Jagdwaffe (fighter force). Following flight training, he was posted to Jagdgeschwader 26 "Schlageter" (JG 26—26th Fighter Wing) in June 1941. Flying with this wing, Galland claimed his first aerial victory on 23 July 1941 on the Western Front over a Royal Air Force fighter aircraft. He was made Staffelkapitän (squadron leader) of 5. Staffel (5th squadron) of JG 26 in May 1942 and in January 1943, Gruppenkommandeur (group commander) of II. Gruppe of JG 26. Following his 34th aerial victory, he was nominated and awarded the Knight's Cross of the Iron Cross on 18 May 1943. Galland claimed his last aerial victory on 12 August 1943. On 17 August 1943, during the Schweinfurt-Regensburg mission, he was killed in action following combat with Republic P-47 Thunderbolt fighters from the 56th Fighter Group.

== Early life and career ==
Galland was born on 23 October 1914 in Bochum in the Province of Westphalia. The family with French Huguenot ancestry, had settled in Westerholt in 1792. Galland was the third of four sons of Adolf Galland (senior) and his French wife Anna, née Schipper. Upholding the family tradition, Galland (senior) worked as the land manager or bailiff to the Count von Westerholt. Galland's two older brothers were Fritz and Adolf and his younger brother was Paul. Their father had pet names for all his family members. His wife Anna was called "Anita". Fritz was called "Toby", Adolf was "Keffer", Wilhelm-Ferdinand was nicknamed "Wutz" and Paul was called "Paulinchen" or since they were expecting a girl, occasionally "Paula". All four Galland brothers later served in the Luftwaffe.

== World War II ==
World War II in Europe began on Friday 1 September 1939 when German forces invaded Poland. At the time, Galland served with Flak-Lehr-Regiment, an anti-aircraft artillery training regiment, and participated in the Battle of France. In late 1940, he began flight training. (Note: Flight training in the Luftwaffe progressed through the levels A1, A2 and B1, B2, referred to as A/B flight training. A training included theoretical and practical training in aerobatics, navigation, long-distance flights and dead-stick landings. The B courses included high-altitude flights, instrument flights, night landings and training to handle the aircraft in difficult situations.) On 27 June 1941, Galland completed his supplementary fighter pilot training with the Ergänzungsgruppe (a training unit) of Jagdgeschwader 26 "Schlageter" (JG 26—26th Fighter Wing) and was then posted to II. Gruppe of JG 26. (Note: For an explanation of Luftwaffe unit designations see Organization of the Luftwaffe during World War II.) JG 26 was named after Albert Leo Schlageter, a martyr cultivated by the Nazi Party. Flying with 6. Staffel (6th squadron), Galland claimed his first aerial victory on 23 July 1941 in defense of a Royal Air Force (RAF) "Circus" mission flown by No. 11 Group. He shot down a Supermarine Spitfire fighter northwest of Hesdin, which according to Caldwell was unconfirmed. He filed his second claim on 27 September following combat with Spitfires in the vicinity of Boulogne. That day, the RAF flew two "Circus" missions, No. 103A attacking the Amiens motor yards, and No. 103B, targeting the Mazingarbe power station. On 6 November, Galland claimed a Royal Australian Air Force (RAAF) Spitfire from No. 452 Squadron shot down in the area of Calais, his last claim in 1941.

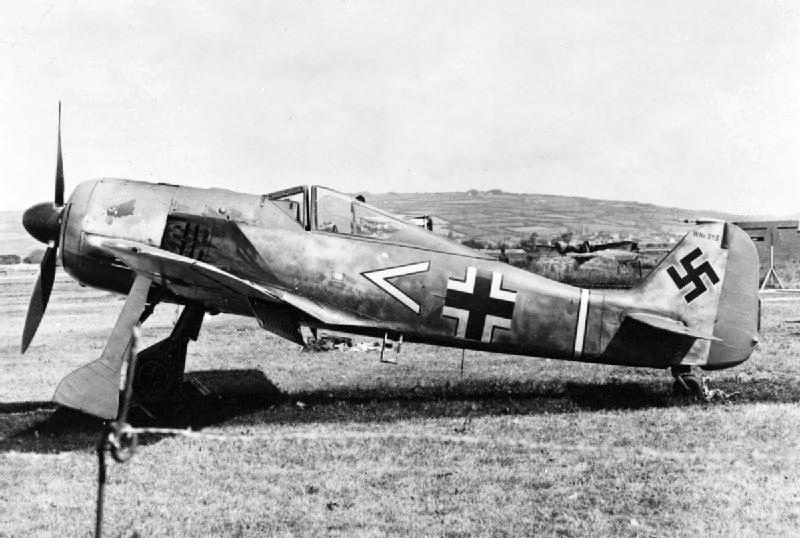
A Focke-Wulf Fw 190 fighter similar to those flown by Galland.

On 28 March 1942, the RAF conducted a "Rodeo" fighter sweeps over enemy territory. In its defense, II. Gruppe was called to action when an attack on Boulogne was imminent. The Hornchurch Wing engaged the Stab (headquarters unit) and I. Gruppe of JG 26 over Guînes and the English Channel while the Kenley Wing led by Group Captain Victor Beamish encountered II. Gruppe between Cap Gris-Nez and Calais. In this aerial battle, JG 26 lost two aircraft and claimed six RAF fighters shot down, including Beamish who was killed in action. Galland accounted for one of the six German claims, taking his total to four aerial victories. He was credited with shooting down a Spitfire at 18:50 in the vicinity of Cap Gris-Nez. On 10 April, the RAF flew two "Rodeos", providing a diversion for a "Ramrod" short range bomber attack missions targeting Boulogne. That day, Galland flew with the Gruppenstab under the command of Hauptmann Joachim Müncheberg. JG 26 lost three aircraft, including two pilots killed in action, for six aerial victories claimed. Galland claimed a 340 (Free French) Squadron Spitfire shot down 5 kilometres (3.1 miles) west of Étaples. His sixth claim was filed on 24 April following combat in defense of "Circus" No. 132. That day, the RAF targeted oil installations at Vlissingen and Walcheren in the Netherlands. II. Gruppe took off from Abbeville, headed for Cap Gris-Nez and attacked No. 234 Squadron, shooting down four Spitfires. One victory was credited to Galland who shot down a Spitfire near Cap d'Albert. On 1 May, four "Rodeos" and "Circus" No. 150 attacked various targets in northern France. II. Gruppe engaged the Hornchurch and North Weald Wing. During this encounter, Galland shot down a Spitfire from either No. 122 or No. 222 Squadron in the vicinity of Dover.

=== Squadron leader ===
On 4 May 1942, Galland was transferred to 5. Staffel (5th squadron) of JG 26. There, Galland replaced Oberleutnant Wolfgang Kosse as squadron leader, at first as Staffelführer and later officially as Staffelkapitän. The next day, Galland claimed his eighth aerial victory, a No. 41 Squadron Spitfire providing escort for "Circus" No. 157's Douglas A-20 Havoc "Boston" bombers. On the early morning of 2 June, the RAF flew a "Roadstead"—a low-level attack on coastal shipping—over the Somme Estuary, supported by two "Rodeos" heading for Saint-Omer. II. Gruppe was scrambled and encountered Spitfires from No. 64 and No. 222 Squadron over the Somme Estuary. In the resulting aerial battle, Galland claimed two Spitfires shot down at 07:10 and 07:18 respectively. On 20 June, II. Gruppe was called to action against "Circus" No. 193 targeting Le Havre. At 15:46, Galland accounted for a No. 118 or No. 501 Squadron Spitfire claimed in the area of Guînes. Galland claimed two further Spitfires shot down west-northwest of the Somme Estuary on 31 July. His opponents were fighters from either No. 121 or No. 332 Squadron.

During the Dieppe Raid on 19 August, 5. Staffel headed by Galland was scrambled from Abbeville at 06:30. At 06:43, 5. Staffel engaged fighters from the Hornchurch Wing, claiming one Spitfire shot down. At 07:49, Galland led his Staffel on the second mission of the day and encountered fighters from the North Weald Wing just north Dieppe. At 07:55, Galland was credited with the destruction of a Spitfire, the aircraft coming from either No. 242, No. 331 or No. 332 Squadron. In the afternoon, Galland led a flight of four Fw 190 to Dieppe. Taking off at Abbeville at 17:24, Galland found the combat zone at Dieppe deserted and spotted a small steamer laying offshore. Galland ordered a strafing run which exploded the ship. He then spotted another vessel which tried to escape north but was also sunk by strafing gunfire. He claimed his 15th aerial victory on 27 August over a Spitfire from the No. 350 (Belgian) Squadron. 5. Staffel had been placed on cockpit-readiness and was scrambled at 13:32 to intercept the incoming fighters approaching at low altitude. Galland's opponent was shot down at 13:45 northwest of the Somme Estuary. The next day, he claimed a Royal Canadian Air Force (RCAF) Spitfire from No. 401 Squadron east of Amiens.

The United States Army Air Forces (USAAF) VIII Bomber Command, later renamed to Eighth Air Force, had begun its regular combat operations on 17 August 1942. On 5 September, VIII Bomber Command targeted the Port of Le Havre and the Sotteville-lès-Rouen railroad yards, escorted by RAF Spitfire fighters from No. 64 and 340 (Free French) Squadron. At 11:35, Galland claimed one of the six Spitfires shot down by JG 26 that day. On 12 October, credited with 17 aerial victories, he was awarded the Honor Goblet of the Luftwaffe (Ehrenpokal der Luftwaffe). Three days later, 5. Staffel encountered twenty Spitfires from No. 122 and No. 453 Squadron between Fécamp and Le Havre, one of which was shot down by Galland. On 31 October, Galland's younger brother Paul, who also served as a fighter pilot in JG 26, was killed in action. Galland claimed another aerial victory on 4 December 20 km (12 mi) northwest of Boulogne over a No. 401 or No. 402 Squadron Spitfire.

On 15 December 1942, II. and III. Gruppe began experimenting with the then new Messerschmitt Bf 109 G-4 variant. Among other changes to earlier variants, it featured GM-1 nitrous oxide 'boost' for its Daimler-Benz DB 605 engine giving it an advantage to contemporary RAF fighters at higher altitude. II. Gruppe was scheduled to be fully reequipped with the Bf 109 G-4 in early 1943. However, Gruppenkommandeur (group commander) Hauptmann Conny Meyer, and later Galland, stalled the transition, retaining their Focke-Wulf Fw 190 fighters until the decision was revoked, as they believed the Fw 190 to be superior and more versatile to the Bf 109. Galland claimed his 21st and last aerial victory of 1942 on 31 December 1942. On New Year's Eve, he shot down a Spitfire from No. 306 Polish Fighter Squadron north-northwest of the Somme Estuary.

=== Group commander and death ===
On 2 January 1943, Galland was appointed Gruppenkommandeur of II. Gruppe of JG 26 by his brother General der Jagdflieger (General of the Fighter Arm) Adolf Galland. General Galland had been unhappy for some time about the JG 26's lack of success against the USAAF strategic aerial bombardment campaign. In consequence, the former Gruppenkommandeur Meyer was transferred to a training unit and Wilhelm-Ferdinand appointed his successor. Galland claimed his first aerial victory in 1943 over a Spitfire from the 340 (Free French) Squadron on 9 January. That day, the RAF targeted the Abbeville-Drucat airfield. On 13 January, Galland mistakenly shot down and killed Unteroffizier Johann Irlinger from 6. Staffel over the Abbeville airfield. Galland had misidentified the Bf 109 G-4 as a Spitfire. On 22 January, Galland led his Gruppe in a mission against an RAF "Circus" consisting of a flight of A-20 "Boston" bombers escorted by numerous Spitfire fighters. In this engagement, Galland was credited with the destruction of a No. 350 (Belgian) Squadron Spitfire shot down west-northwest of Gravelines. Four days later, II. Gruppe faced Spitfires from No. 64 and No. 306 Polish Fighter Squadron, resulting in another victory over a Spitfire. His 24th aerial victory was claimed near Watten. This resulted in the presentation of the German Cross in Gold (Deutsches Kreuz in Gold) on 28 January 1943, which he received for 24 aerial victories.

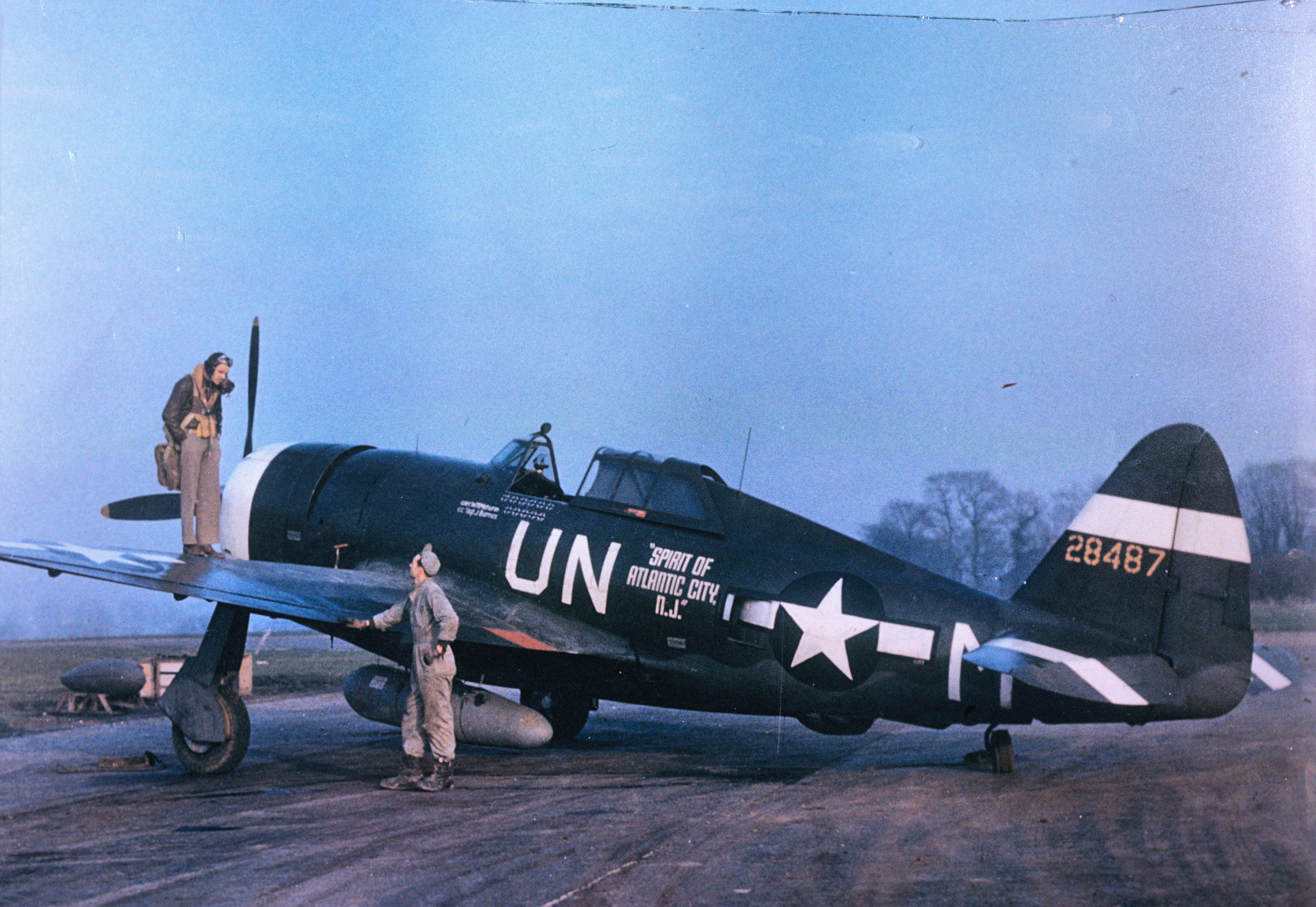
Captain Mahurin of the 56th Fighter Group standing on the port wing of his P-47 Thunderbolt aircraft.

On 8 March, VIII Bomber Command attacked Rennes with 54 Boeing B-17 Flying Fortress bombers and Rouen railroad yards with 16 Consolidated B-24 Liberator bombers. While Major Josef Priller and his flight attacked the escort fighters, Galland led his 24 Fw 190 fighters in a head-on attack on the B-24 bomber formation from the 44th Bombardment Group. Without damage or loss to the Fw 190 fighters, four B-24 bombers were claimed, one of which by Galland, shot down near Tôtes. According to Weal, this was the only time a Luftwaffe unit forced the USAAF bombers to turn back before reaching their target. On 17 April, Galland claimed a North American P-51 Mustang fighter. Since no P-51 fighters were involved, it is possible that his opponent was a misidentified No. 56 Squadron Hawker Typhoon which crashed after engine failure. On 21 April, Galland led his flight against eleven Lockheed Ventura medium bombers from No. 21 Squadron RAF attacking the Abbeville railroad yards. In this encounter, Galland was credited with the destruction of two Ventura bombers. He was awarded the Knight's Cross of the Iron Cross (Ritterkreuz des Eisernen Kreuzes) on 18 May 1943. The nomination had been submitted following his 34th aerial victory. The presentation was made at the Vitry airfield by Generalfeldmarschall (Field Marshal) Hugo Sperrle.

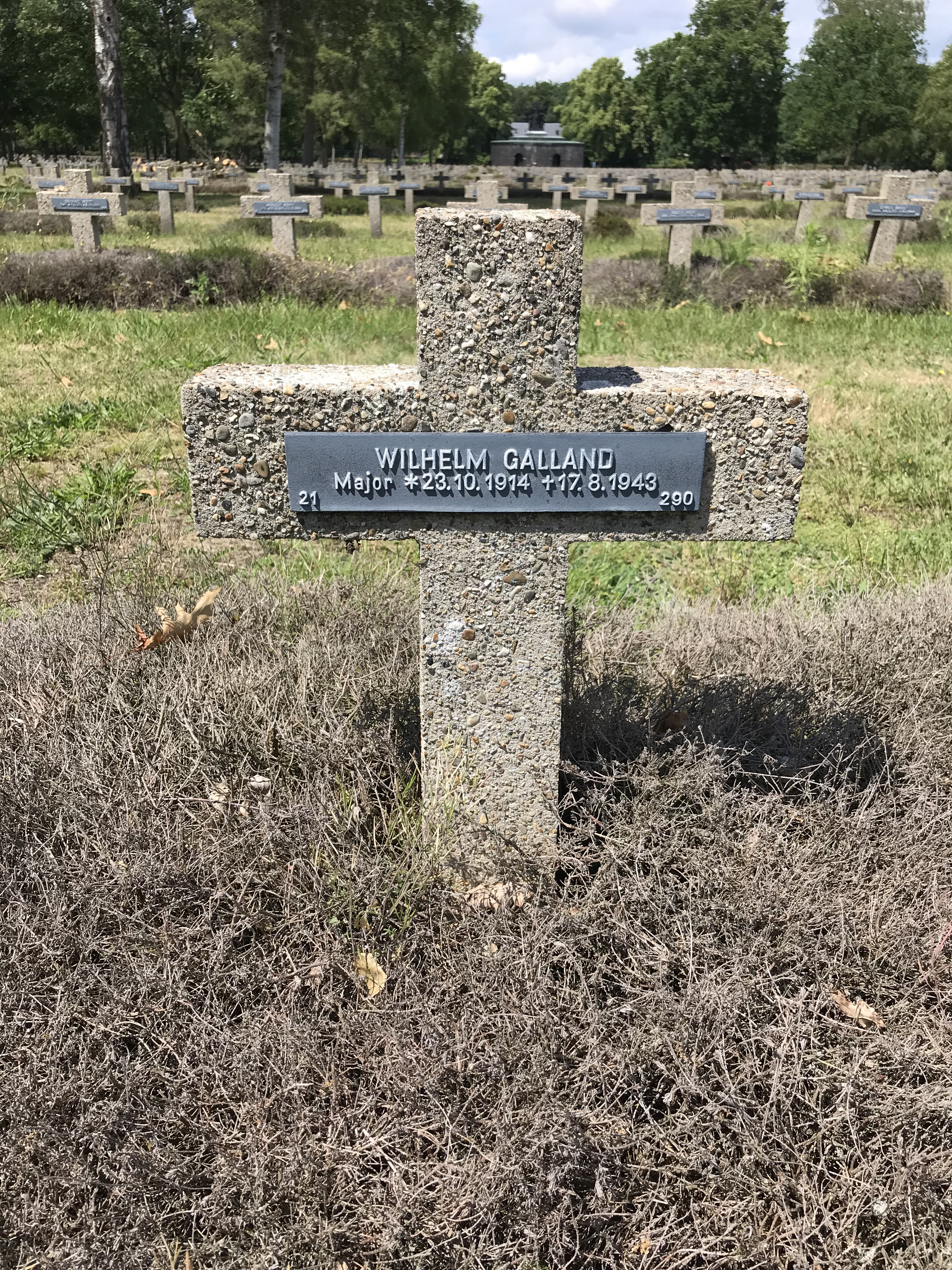
Lommel German war cemetery - Wilhelm Galland

In the late afternoon on 4 July, RAF North American B-25 Mitchell bombers attacked Amiens. To counter this attack, Jagdfliegerführer 2, among other units, dispatched II. Gruppe of JG 26 headed by Galland. The Gruppe claimed four aerial victories over the escorting fighters, including a Spitfire shot down by Galland, for the loss of one pilot killed in action. On 9 July, Galland had just been promoted to Major (major), and claimed another Spitfire shot down. This combat occurred over Boulogne and was in defense of "Ramrod" 127. RAF Y-stations recorded the communications of this encounter. Both sides claimed one aerial victory each with no aircraft lost on either side. Galland shot down two Republic P-47 Thunderbolt fighters from the 78th Fighter Group on 14 July. The first was claimed northwest of Hesdin, the second 10–15 km (6.2–9.3 mi) west of Étaples. The next day, he accounted for another P-47 and a "Boston" bomber, both claimed over or near the Somme Estuary. On 30 July 1943, the day marked the end of "Blitz Week", the USAAF targeted the Fieseler aircraft manufacturing factories located in Kassel. To counter this attack, Luftflotte 3 (3rd Air Fleet) dispatched eleven fighter groups, among them II. Gruppe of JG 26 led by Galland. On this mission, Galland claimed a B-17 bomber shot down east of Apeldoorn. On 12 August, the USAAF flew bombing missions against the Ruhr and Rheine area. In defense of this attack, Galland claimed his last aerial victory, a B-17 bomber. This claim in the vicinity of Siegburg was in fact an Herausschuss (separation shot)—a severely damaged heavy bomber forced to separate from its combat box which was counted as an aerial victory.

Galland was killed in action on 17 August 1943 during the Schweinfurt-Regensburg mission, shot down in his Fw 190 A-6 (Werknummer 530125—factory number) 5 kilometres (3.1 miles) west of Maastricht. Unteroffizier Heinz Gomann, Galland's wingman on this mission, had yelled out a warning too late. Galland disappeared after the first P-47 attack. His body, still in his aircraft, was found two months later north of Liège. II. Gruppe took off on a bomber intercept mission and engaged the B-17 bomber formation but the German aircraft were intercepted by escorting P-47 fighters from the 56th Fighter Group, USAAF, under command of Colonel Hubert Zemke. It is assumed that Galland was shot down by the American fighter pilot Walker "Bud" Mahurin of the 56th Fighter Group. Galland was temporarily succeeded by Hauptmann Johannes Naumann until Oberstleutnant Johannes Seifert took command on II. Gruppe on 9 September.

== Summary of career ==
=== Aerial victory claims ===
According to US historian David T. Zabecki, Galland was credited with 55 aerial victories. Spick also lists him with 55 aerial victories and a mission-to-claim ratio of 3.38. Mathews and Foreman, authors of Luftwaffe Aces: Biographies and Victory Claims, researched the German Federal Archives and found records for 56 aerial victory claims, all of which were claimed on the Western Front and include eight four-engined bombers.

Chronicle of aerial victories
This along with the * (asterisk) indicates an Herausschuss (separation shot)—a severely damaged heavy bomber forced to separate from his combat box which was counted as an aerial victory. This along with the & (ampersand) indicates a endgültige Vernichtung (final destruction)—a coup de grâce inflicted on an already damaged heavy bomber. This and the ? (question mark) indicates information discrepancies listed by Prien, Stemmer, Rodeike, Bock, Mathews and Foreman.
Claim	Date	Time	Type	Location	Claim	Date	Time	Type	Location
– 6. Staffel of Jagdgeschwader 26 "Schlageter" – On the Western Front — 22 June – 31 December 1941
1	23 July 1941	20:50	Spitfire	northwest of Hesdin	3	6 November 1941	15:35	Spitfire	Calais
2	27 September 1941	15:35	Spitfire	Boulogne					
– 6. Staffel of Jagdgeschwader 26 "Schlageter" – On the Western Front — 1 January – May 1942
4	28 March 1942	19:00	Spitfire	Cap Gris-Nez	7	1 May 1942	19:45	Spitfire	Dover
5	10 April 1942	17:45	Spitfire	5 km (3.1 mi) west of Étaples	8	5 May 1942	14:53	Spitfire	Boulogne
6	24 April 1942	14:54	Spitfire	Cap d'Albert					
– 5. Staffel of Jagdgeschwader 26 "Schlageter" – On the Western Front — June – 31 December 1942
9	2 June 1942	07:10? (Note: According to Mathews and Foreman claimed at 07:15.)	Spitfire	Somme Estuary	16	28 August 1942	14:35? (Note: According to Mathews and Foreman claimed at 14:40.)	Spitfire	east of Amiens
10	2 June 1942	07:18? (Note: According to Mathews and Foreman claimed at 07:20.)	Spitfire	Somme Estuary	17	5 September 1942	11:35? (Note: According to Mathews and Foreman claimed at 11:36.)	Spitfire	Le Tréport
11	20 June 1942	15:46	Spitfire	Guînes	18	15 October 1942	16:34	Spitfire	west-northwest of Fécamp
12	31 July 1942	15:07	Spitfire	west-northwest of Somme Estuary	19	4 December 1942	14:55	Spitfire	Dover/Folkestone
13	31 July 1942	15:08	Spitfire	west-northwest of Somme Estuary	20	12 December 1942	11:39	Spitfire	northwest of Boulogne
14	19 August 1942	07:55? (Note: According to Mathews and Foreman claimed at 08:00.)	Spitfire	north of Dieppe	21	31 December 1942	14:45	Spitfire	north-northwest of Somme Estuary
15	27 August 1942	13:45? (Note: According to Mathews and Foreman claimed at 13:48.)	Spitfire	northwest of Somme Estuary					
– Stab II. Gruppe of Jagdgeschwader 26 "Schlageter" – On the Western Front — 1 January – 31 December 1943
22	9 January 1943	13:45	Spitfire	west of Somme Estuary	40	17 April 1943	15:06	P-51	20 km (12 mi) west-northwest of Somme Estuary
23	22 January 1943	15:30	Spitfire	west-northwest of Gravelines	41	21 April 1943	12:14	Ventura	northeast of Somme Estuary
24	26 January 1943	12:52	Spitfire	1 km (0.62 mi) west of Watten	42	21 April 1943	12:20	Ventura	10–20 km (6.2–12.4 mi) west of Somme Estuary
25	3 February 1943	11:05	Hudson	10 km (6.2 mi) north of Grand-Fort-Philippe	43	16 June 1943	07:10	Spitfire	Calais/Dover
26	3 February 1943	11:12	Spitfire	15 km (9.3 mi) north of Grand-Fort-Philippe	44	20 June 1943	13:30	Spitfire	northeast of Hesdin
27	3 February 1943	15:28? (Note: According to Mathews and Foreman claimed at 15:30.)	Spitfire	15 km (9.3 mi) north of Dunkirk	45	22 June 1943	09:22	B-17	10 km (6.2 mi) northwest of Vlissingen
28	13 February 1943	10:17	Spitfire	6 km (3.7 mi) west of Hardelot	46? (Note: According to Prien, Stemmer, Rodeike and Bock, this aerial victory is unconfirmed, while Mathews and Foreman list this claim as Galland's 46th aerial victory.)	22 June 1943	09:25	B-17&	20 km (12 mi) northwest of Vlissingen
29	13 February 1943	12:20	Spitfire	southeast of Le Touquet	47	26 June 1943	18:52	P-47	north of Neufchâtel
30	15 February 1943	16:04	Spitfire	6–8 km (3.7–5.0 mi) southeast of Ramsgate	48	26 June 1943	19:04	P-47	10 km (6.2 mi) northwest of Dieppe
31? (Note: According to Prien, Stemmer, Rodeike and Bock, this aerial victory was a joined II. Gruppe claim and is not explicitly linked to Galland.)	16 February 1943	17:35	Spitfire	8 km (5.0 mi) northwest of Abbeville	49	4 July 1943	17:37	Spitfire	Vignacourt near Amiens
32	26 February 1943	10:35? (Note: According to Mathews and Foreman claimed at 10:38.)	Spitfire	15 km (9.3 mi) southwest of Saint-Omer	50	9 July 1943	08:16	Spitfire	15 km (9.3 mi) west of Boulogne
33	8 March 1943	14:04	B-24	Tôtes, 35 km (22 mi) north of Rouen	51	14 July 1943	07:50	P-47	northwest of Hesdin
34	13 March 1943	15:35	Spitfire	Étaples	52	14 July 1943	08:05	P-47	10–15 km (6.2–9.3 mi) west of Étaples
35	14 March 1943	17:55	Spitfire	10 km (6.2 mi) southwest of Boulogne	53	15 July 1943	16:50	Boston	Somme Estuary
36	4 April 1943	14:40	Spitfire	southeast of Fécamp	54	15 July 1943	16:55	P-47	10 km (6.2 mi) west-northwest of Somme Estuary
37	4 April 1943	14:45	B-17	8 km (5.0 mi) north of Fécamp	55	30 July 1943	10:05	B-17	15 km (9.3 mi) southeast of Apeldoorn
38	4 April 1943	14:55	B-17	20–30 km (12–19 mi) north of Fécamp	56	12 August 1943	09:10	B-17*	Siegburg
39	5 April 1943	15:25	B-17	south of Antwerp					

=== Awards ===
- Iron Cross (1939) 2nd and 1st Class
- Honour Goblet of the Luftwaffe (Ehrenpokal der Luftwaffe) on 12 October 1942 as Oberleutnant and Staffelkapitän
- German Cross in Gold on 28 January 1943 as Hauptmann in the II./Jagdgeschwader 26
- Knight's Cross of the Iron Cross on 18 May 1943 as Hauptmann and Gruppenkommandeur of the II./Jagdgeschwader 26 "Schlageter"
