= Paul Galland =

German World War II fighter pilot

- Born: 3 November 1919
- Died: 31 October 1942 (aged 22); Diksmuide-Comines
- Cause of death: Killed in action
- Relatives: Adolf Galland; Wilhelm-Ferdinand Galland
- Military career
- Allegiance: Nazi Germany
- Branch: Luftwaffe
- Service years: 1939–1942
- Rank: Leutnant (Second Lieutenant)
- Nickname: Paulinchen
- Unit: JG 26
- Conflicts: See battles World War II: Western Front †; Operation Cerberus; Dieppe Raid
- Awards: Honor Goblet of the Luftwaffe

Paul Galland (3 November 1919 — 31 October 1942) was a Luftwaffe ace and brother of Luftwaffe aces Adolf Galland and Wilhelm-Ferdinand Galland. He had claimed 17 aerial victories in 107 combat missions. Flying with Jagdgeschwader 26 "Schlageter" on the Western Front, he was killed in combat with Royal Air Force Supermarine Spitfire fighters on 31 October 1942.

== Early life and career ==
Galland was born on 3 November 1919. The family with French Huguenot ancestry, had settled in Westerholt in 1792. Galland was the last of four sons of Adolf Galland (senior) and his French wife Anna, née Schipper. Upholding the family tradition, Galland (senior) worked as the land manager or bailiff to the Count von Westerholt. Galland's three older brothers were Fritz, Adolf and Wilhelm-Ferdinand. Their father had pet names for all his family members. His wife Anna was called "Anita". Fritz was called "Toby", Adolf was "Keffer", Wilhelm-Ferdinand was nicknamed "Wutz" and Paul was called "Paulinchen" or since they were expecting a girl, occasionally "Paula". All four Galland brothers later served in the Luftwaffe. Galland was trained as a fighter pilot at the Jagdfliegerschule 5 (JFS 5—5th Fighter Pilot School) in Wien-Schwechat where he befriended Walter Nowotny. (Note: Flight training in the Luftwaffe progressed through the levels A1, A2 and B1, B2, referred to as A/B flight training. A training included theoretical and practical training in aerobatics, navigation, long-distance flights and dead-stick landings. The B courses included high-altitude flights, instrument flights, night landings and training to handle the aircraft in difficult situations.) At the JFS 5, his roommates were Nowotny, Walter Krupinski, and Peter Göring, a nephew of the Reichsmarschall (Empire Marshal) Hermann Göring.

== World War II ==
World War II in Europe began on Friday 1 September 1939 when German forces invaded Poland. On 28 February 1941, Leutnant Galland was transferred from the Ergänzungsstaffel, a supplementary training unit, of Jagdgeschwader 26 "Schlageter" (JG 26—26th Fighter Wing) to 8. Staffel (8th squadron). (Note: For an explanation of Luftwaffe unit designations see Organization of the Luftwaffe during World War II.) 8. Staffel was a squadron of III. Gruppe (3rd group) which at the time was commanded by Staffelkapitän (squadron leader) Oberleutnant Gustav Sprick while III. Gruppe was headed by his brother Adolf. On 20 August, his brother was appointed Geschwaderkommodore (wing commander) of JG 26 and Hauptmann Gerhard Schöpfel, who had led 9. Staffel, succeeded him as Gruppenkommandeur (group commander) of III. Gruppe. Galland had joined 8. Staffel at a time when III. Gruppe was being reequipped with the Messerschmitt Bf 109 F series at Bonn-Hangelar. On 1 April, the Gruppe was sent to France, at first based at Saint-Brieuc airfield before on 1 June it was ordered to an airfield at Ligescourt, north of Abbeville. Sprick was killed in action on 28 June, he was succeeded as commander of 8. Staffel by Oberleutnant Hans-Jürgen Westphal.

=== Channel Front ===
On 6 July 1941, the Royal Air Force (RAF) flew "Circus" No. 35 and targeted Lille and the Fives-Lille engineering company. In defense of this attack, Galland claimed his first aerial victory over a Supermarine Spitfire fighter. This aerial victory was not confirmed, and he was not given credit for this claim. Westphal was wounded on 13 August and command of 8. Staffel passed on to Hauptmann Johann Schmid. Galland was credited with his first aerial victory on 4 September 1941 when he shot down a Spitfire at 17:30. The RAF flew "Circus" No. 93 that day, targeting the Mazingarbe ammonia factory. His third claim, which again remained unconfirmed, was filed on 17 September. "Circus" No. 95 and 96 targeted the Mazingrabe power station and the Shell Oil plant at Marquise with 24 Bristol Blenheim bombers and six Handley Page Hampden bombers. In this encounter, Galland had claimed a Spitfire from No. 306 Polish Fighter Squadron. On 19 October, III. Gruppe moved to a makeshift airfield at Coquelles, close to Calais on the English Channel. There, they began preparations for operating the then new Focke-Wulf Fw 190 A-1. The Gruppe was fully reequipped and operational with the Fw 190 in mid-November 1941. On 6 November, Schmid was killed in action and Oberleutnant Karl Borris was chosen as his successor. A month later, his brother Adolf was appointed General der Jagdflieger (General of Fighters) on 5 December 1941. In consequence of Adolf's advance in command responsibility, Schöpfel succeeded him as Geschwaderkommodore of JG 26 and Hauptmann Josef Priller became the new Gruppenkommandeur of III. Gruppe.

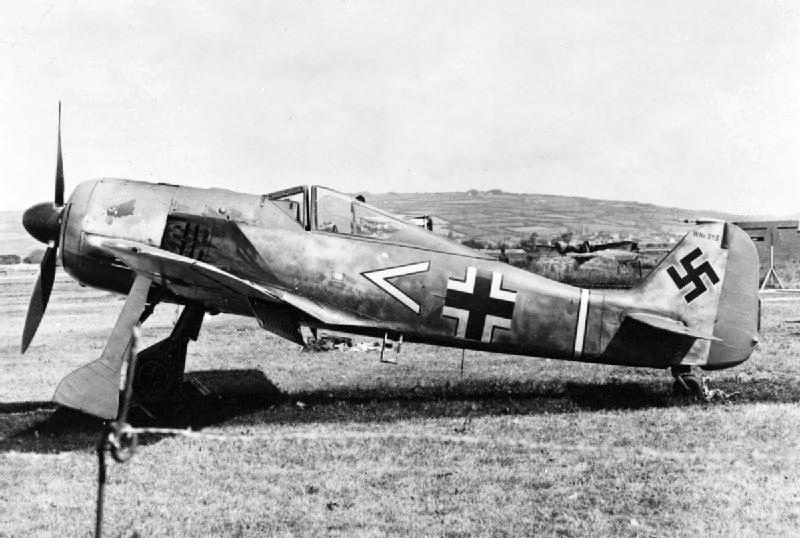
A Focke-Wulf Fw 190 fighter similar to those flown by Galland.

Galland claimed his second confirmed aerial victory during Operation Donnerkeil. The objective of this operation was to give the German battleships Scharnhorst and Gneisenau and the heavy cruiser Prinz Eugen fighter protection in the breakout from Brest to Germany. The Channel Dash operation (11–13 February 1942) by the Kriegsmarine was codenamed Operation Cerberus by the Germans. In support of this, the Luftwaffe, formulated an air superiority plan dubbed Operation Donnerkeil for the protection of the three German capital ships. Sources vary with respect to the number of aerial victories Galland was credited with during this operation. According to Caldwell, Galland was credited with a single Fairey Swordfish biplane torpedo bomber from 825 Naval Air Squadron shot down at 13:45 on 12 February north of Gravelines. While authors Mathews and Foreman list him with four Swordfish torpedo bombers shot down in the timeframe 13:45 to 13:50 in combat north of Gravelines.

On 10 April, the RAF flew two "Rodeos", providing a diversion for a "Ramrod" short range bomber attack missions targeting Boulogne. JG 26 lost three aircraft, including two pilots killed in action, for six aerial victories claimed. Galland claimed a No. 313 Squadron Spitfire shot down at 17:43. His next claim was filed on 24 April following combat in defense of "Circus" No. 132. That day, the RAF targeted oil installations at Vlissingen and Walcheren in the Netherlands. In this encounter, Galland shot down a Spitfire from No. 122 Squadron northwest of Ostend. The next day, the RAF sent six Douglas A-20 Havoc "Boston" bombers on "Circus" No. 137 to Abbeville. At 16:40, Galland shot down a Spitfire protecting the bombers. Galland claimed a No. 306 Polish Fighter Squadron Spitfire shot down at 17:57 on 26 April southeast of Calais. The RAF had sent "Circus" No. 138 to airfields in northern France. On 1 May, RAF Fighter Command sent four "Rodeos" and one "Circus" to France. III. Gruppe, led by Priller, struck the Kenley Wing near Calais. At 19:32, Galland shot down a Spitfire from either No. 457, No. 485 or No. 602 Squadron. Two days later, Galland claimed another unconfirmed aerial victory. In defense of two "Rodeos", one "Ramrods" and one "Circus" to northern France, Galland claimed a No. 174 or No. 303 Squadron Spitfire destroyed at 16:00 near Calais.

Fighter Command planned three "Circuses" on 1 June. III. Gruppe was scrambled at 13:20 and directed to Ostend. Priller led the attack from above and out of the sun. Within quick succession, three Spitfires were shot down from No. 350 (Belgian) Squadron and one further from No. 71 Squadron, an Eagle Squadron. At 13:54 the German fighters were recalled. In this engagement, Galland was credited with one Spitfire destroyed at 13:46. On 29 June, "Circus" No. 195 attacked Hazebrouck with 12 "Boston" bombers. Galland shot down one of the escorting Spitfires from No. 64 or the No. 350 (Belgian) Squadron at 16:55. On 30 July, Galland claimed two unconfirmed aerial victories over Spitfires. That day, the RAF flew "Circus" No. 200, heading for the airfield at Abbeville/Drucat Airfield. The attack was supported by several "Ramrod" attacks on the airfield at Saint-Omer-Wizernes and escorted by the Hornchurch Wing. During the Dieppe Raid on 19 August, on III. Gruppe's third patrol of the day, Galland and two other pilots took off from Wevelgem airfield at 12:21. At 12:30, the flight intercepted low flying Spitfires and North American P-51 Mustang fighters from the Biggin Hill Wing. In this encounter, Galland claimed a Spitfire shot down at 12:43 in the vicinity of Dieppe. According to Caldwell, Galland claimed another unconfirmed Spitfire destroyed on 27 August. This claim considered confirmed by the authors Mathews and Foreman; a Spitfire shot down at 15:06 12 kilometres (7.5 miles) east of Dover. The authors Mathews and Foreman credit Galland with two aerial victories on 29 August. A first Spitfire shot down at 11:47 15 km (9.3 mi) west of Cap Gris-Nez followed by a second Spitfire three minutes later 5 km (3.1 mi) west-northwest of Cap Gris-Nez. These two claims are not listed by Caldwell.

=== Death ===
On 31 October 1942, seventeen "Boston" bombers from No. 88 Squadron and No. 107 Squadron attacked the power stations in the vicinity of Lille (Rysel) and Béthune. Galland, with his wingman Oberfeldwebel Johann Edmann, shot down one of the Bostons. The "Boston" was Z2179 from No. 107 Squadron piloted by Pilot Officer Henry Collings on a mission to Pont-à-Vendin.

Five hours later, Galland and Edmann participated on a fighter escort mission to a fighter-bomber raid on Canterbury. At 18:15, intercepting Spitfires shot down Galland's Fw 190 A-4 (Werknummer 2402—factory number) approximately 20 km (12 mi) west of Calais. Mathews and Foremann assume that the Spitfire responsible for his death was piloted by Flight Lieutenant Johannes Jacobus le Roux from No. 91 Squadron. According to Isby, Galland was shot down by Flying Officer Jean Maridor also from No. 91 Squadron, the only pilot to have claimed a Fw 190 shot down that day. In Caldwell's account, Galland had tried to aid Leutnant Artur Beese from 1. Staffel of JG 26, who had called for help over the radio. In the rescue attempt, Galland's Fw 190 stalled during a steep climb and was forced to dive away. At that instant, Galland was attacked from above by the Spitfire and was shot down. Edmann then attacked the Spitfire and shot it down. Posthumously, Galland was awarded the Honour Goblet of the Luftwaffe (Ehrenpokal der Luftwaffe) on 7 December 1942.

== Summary of career ==
=== Aerial victory claims ===
Mathews and Foreman, authors of Luftwaffe Aces: Biographies and Victory Claims, researched the German Federal Archives and found records for 17 aerial victory claims, plus five further unconfirmed claims, all of which were claimed on the Western Front.

Chronicle of aerial victories
This and the – (dash) indicates unconfirmed aerial victory claims for which Galland did not receive credit. This and the ? (question mark) indicates information discrepancies listed by Caldwell, Prien, Stemmer, Rodeike, Bock, Mathews and Foreman.
Claim	Date	Time	Type	Location	Claim	Date	Time	Type	Location
– 8. Staffel of Jagdgeschwader 26 "Schlageter" – On the Western Front — 22 June – 31 December 1941
— (Note: This unconfirmed claim is not listed by Prien, Stemmer, Rodeike and Bock.)	6 July 1941	—	Spitfire		—	17 September 1941	—	Spitfire	
1	4 September 1941	17:30	Spitfire						
– 6. Staffel of Jagdgeschwader 26 "Schlageter" – On the Western Front — 1 January – 31 October 1942
2	12 February 1942	13:45	Swordfish	north of Gravelines	11	1 June 1942	13:46	Spitfire	
3? (Note: This claim is not listed by Caldwell.)	12 February 1942	13:47	Swordfish	10 km (6.2 mi) north of Gravelines	12	29 June 1942	16:55	Spitfire	
4?	12 February 1942	13:48	Swordfish	north of Gravelines	—	30 July 1942	—	Spitfire	
5?	12 February 1942	13:50	Swordfish	20 km (12 mi) north of Gravelines	—	30 July 1942	—	Spitfire	
6	10 April 1942	17:43	Spitfire	7 km (4.3 mi) north of Mardyck	13	19 August 1942	12:43	Spitfire	Dieppe
7	24 April 1942	14:51	Spitfire	northwest of Ostend	14? (Note: According to Caldwell, this claim is unconfirmed.)	27 August 1942	15:06	Spitfire	12 km (7.5 mi) east of Dover
8	25 April 1942	16:40	Spitfire		15?	29 August 1942	11:47	Spitfire	15 km (9.3 mi) west of Cap Gris-Nez
9	26 April 1942	17:57	Spitfire		16?	29 August 1942	11:50	Spitfire	5 km (3.1 mi) west-northwest of Cap Gris-Nez
10	1 May 1942	19:32	Spitfire		17	31 October 1942	12:30	Boston	7 km (4.3 mi) southeast of Diksmuide
—	3 May 1942	16:00	Spitfire	Calais					

=== Awards ===
- Iron Cross (1939) 2nd and 1st Class
- Honor Goblet of the Luftwaffe on 7 December 1942 (posthumously) as Leutnant and pilot
