= Fighter Pilots' Revolt incident =

Minor insurrection of a small group of high-ranking Luftwaffe pilots in early 1945

The so-called Fighter Pilots' Revolt was a minor insurrection of a small group of high-ranking Luftwaffe pilots in early 1945, when they confronted Reich Marshal and chief of the Luftwaffe Hermann Göring with their demands on the conduct of the air war. Following the incident some officers were relieved of their positions or were reassigned.

== Incident ==
The incident originated in the contentious relationship between Adolf Galland, the General of Fighters (in charge of the Luftwaffe's fighter force), and Reich Marshal Hermann Göring. The arguments—mainly over aircraft procurement and armament for the defence of Germany from Allied bombing—began a growing personal rift between Göring and Galland.

On 19 January 1945, Karl Koller (Chief of the Luftwaffe General Staff) arranged for a meeting between Göring and leading Jagdwaffe officers in the Haus der Flieger. The group of officers included spokesmen Günther Lützow, Hannes Trautloft, Eduard Neumann, Gustav Rödel, and Johannes Steinhoff. According to Koller, the group of officers wanted to express, "A deep feeling of bitterness at the continued charge of cowardice. Lack of confidence in the direction of operations … Lack of confidence in the Luftwaffe high command with regard to armament, concentration of forces, personnel policy, and leadership of the Luftwaffe generally … Objection is taken to the dismissal of Galland, behind whom the Jagdwaffe stand virtually to a man." According to Steinhoff, "The confrontation with Göring was occurring at a time when the Luftwaffe had practically ceased to exist as a force that the Allied bombers needed to reckon with at all seriously as they went about their work of wearing down the Reich's resistance. And since on top of this the fighter reserve built up with such energy and determination by Galland had been senselessly dissipated in the useless and ineffective offensive operation known as 'Baseplate' that Göring had ordered on 1 January, the prospects for any sort of concentric, effective defence in the air looked gloomy."

Along with their "Points for Discussion," Steinhoff claimed that Göring was also told by him that "Your Jagdwaffe is still in a position to relieve the country by putting at least a temporary halt to the bomb horror. This means that the reserve bomber units detailed for fighter operations must be placed under experienced Jagdwaffe officers, and we demand that all Me 262 jet aircraft be released immediately for fighter operations." Steinhoff goes on to recount Göring's reaction, "At this there was no holding Göring. His authoritarian nature had already had to swallow too much insubordination".

According to Adam Makos, "Göring wanted to shoot Galland, Lützow, and Steinhoff but needed time to assemble a case because each man was a national hero. Eager to move the mutineers from German soil, Göring banished Lützow to a desk job in Italy with Rödel and Neumann. He fired Trautloff and assigned him to run a flying school. To spite Steinhoff, Göring banned him from all airfields and contact with the other mutineers."

Rather than lose Galland, Hitler ordered Göring to give Galland the opportunity to form his own elite unit (Jagdverband 44) flying the Me 262. Steinhoff and Lützow joined the squadron at Reim airfield near Munich and flew with Galland against US bombers in the last days of the war.
