= Hannes Trautloft =

German aviator (1912–1995)

- Trautloft in the Bundesluftwaffe
- Born: 3 March 1912; Großobringen
- Died: 12 January 1995 (aged 82); Bad Wiessee
- Burial place: Waldfriedhof Solln
- Military career
- Allegiance: Nazi Germany (to 1945); West Germany
- Branch: Luftwaffe; German Air Force
- Service years: 1931–1945; 1957–1970
- Rank: Oberst (colonel); Generalleutnant (lieutenant general)
- Units: III./JG 134 Condor Legion JG 77, JG 51, JG 54
- Commands: III./JG 51, JG 54 Grünherz Air Force Group South
- Conflicts: See battles Spanish Civil War World War II: Invasion of Poland; Battle of France; Battle of Britain; Balkans Campaign; Operation Barbarossa
- Awards: Spanish Cross in Gold with Swords; Knight's Cross of the Iron Cross; Great Cross of Merit with Star

Otto Hans "Hannes" Trautloft (3 March 1912 – 12 January 1995) was a German Luftwaffe military aviator during the Spanish Civil War and World War II, and general in the postwar German Air Force. As a fighter ace, he is credited with 58 enemy aircraft shot down, including 5 in Spain, 8 on the Western Front and 45 on the Eastern Front of World War II.

Born in Großobringen, Trautloft volunteered for military service in the Reichsheer of the Weimar Republic in 1931. In parallel, he was accepted for flight training with the Deutsche Verkehrsfliegerschule, a covert military-training organization, and at the Lipetsk fighter-pilot school. Following flight training, he served with Jagdgeschwader 134 "Horst Wessel" (JG 134—134th Fighter Wing) and was one of the first German volunteers to fight in the Spanish Civil War. From August to December 1936, he claimed five aerial victories. For his service in Spain he was awarded the Spanish Cross in Gold with Swords.

Following his service in Spain, Trautloft held various command positions, and at the outbreak of World War II on 1 September 1939, he was the Staffelkapitän (squadron leader) of 2. Staffel (2nd squadron) of Jagdgeschwader 77 (JG 77—77th Fighter Wing). He claimed his first aerial victory during the Invasion of Poland and was appointed Gruppenkommandeur (group commander) of I. Gruppe of Jagdgeschwader 20 which later became III. Gruppe of Jagdgeschwader 51 (JG 51—51st Fighter Wing). In August 1940, during the Battle of Britain, Trautloft was given command of Jagdgeschwader 54 (JG 54—54th Fighter Wing). He led JG 54 in Operation Barbarossa, the German invasion of the Soviet Union in June 1941. There, he was awarded the Knight's Cross of the Iron Cross on 27 July 1941. Trautloft continued to lead JG 54 on the Eastern Front until July 1943 when he was called to the staff of the General der Jagdflieger (General of Fighters), assisting in the readiness, training and tactics of the Luftwaffe fighter force.

After the war, Trautloft joined the new German Air Force of West Germany in 1957. Serving as deputy Inspector of the Air Force and commander of Luftwaffengruppe Süd (Air Force Group South), Trautloft retired in 1970 holding the rank of Generalleutnant (lieutenant general). He died on 12 January 1995 in Bad Wiessee.

== Early life ==
Trautloft was born on 3 March 1912 in Großobringen near Weimar in Thüringen to Elsa (née Hilpert) and Otto Trautloft. He had a sister, Gretel.

== Early military career ==
On 7 April 1931, he began his pilot training at the Deutsche Verkehrsfliegerschule (German Air Transport School) at Schleißheim. The course he and 29 other trainees attended was called Kameradschaft 31, abbreviated "K 31". Among the members of "K 31" were future Luftwaffe staff officers Bernd von Brauchitsch, Wolfgang Falck, Günther Lützow, Günther Radusch and Ralph von Rettberg. Trautloft graduated from the Deutsche Verkehrfliegerschule 19 February 1932. From "K 31" Trautloft and 9 others were recommended for Sonderausbildung (special training) at the Lipetsk fighter-pilot school. These 10 men were the privileged few and were allowed to attend fighter pilot training. Following four months of training in the Soviet Union, he returned to Germany and joined the military service of the Reichswehr and attended the Kriegsschule (war school) in Dresden. on 1 May 1934, In October 1934, Trautloft was posted to the Jagdfliegerschule at Schleißheim.

On 1 May 1936, Trautloft was posted to Jagdgeschwader 134 "Horst Wessel" (JG 134—134th Fighter Wing), named after the Nazi martyr Horst Wessel. At the time of the outbreak of the Spanish Civil War, Trautloft was serving in the 9. Staffel (9th squadron) of JG 134. (Note: For an explanation of Luftwaffe unit designations see Organization of the Luftwaffe during World War II.) This squadron was subordinated to III. Gruppe (3rd group) of JG 134 and was commanded by Major Oskar Dinort. The Gruppe had been moved to an airfield at Cologne-Butzweilerhof on 9 March 1936 following the Remilitarization of the Rhineland. There on 28 July, Dinort called Trautloft and informed him of the unfolding events in Spain and Trautloft proactively volunteered for service in Spain.

== Spanish Civil War ==
Sworn to secrecy, Trautloft was instructed to immediately travel to Dortmund where he received further instructions from Kurt-Bertram von Döring, and then to the assembly location at Döberitz. There, 25 officers and 66 non-commissioned officers, soldiers and civilian technicians gathered, including six pilots of which Trautloft was one. (Note: The other five pilots were Oberleutnant Herwig Knüppel, Leutnant Otto-Heinrich Freiherr von Houwald, also from III. Gruppe of JG 134, and Oberleutnant Kraft Eberhardt, Leutnant Gerhard Klein and Leutnant Ekkehard Hefter.) This detachment was then placed under the overall command of Oberst (Colonel) Alexander von Scheele. The volunteers were then discharged from the Wehrmacht and dressed in civilian clothes. As tourists of the Reisegesellschaft Union (Union Travel Association), the volunteers travelled aboard the SS Usaramo, a passenger ship of the Woermann-Linie from Hamburg to Cádiz on 31 July. The Usaramo also transported the equipment and weapons, including six disassembled and boxed Heinkel He 51 biplane fighter aircraft.

The ship arrived in Cádiz on 7 August 1936 and the men then travelled by train to Seville. At Tablada airfield, the pilots assisted in reassembling the He-51 fighters, the first of which becoming operational on 10 August. On 25 August, during the Nationalist advance on Madrid, Trautloft and two other German pilots flew their first combat mission in Spain. In the vicinity of Madrid, the Germans spotted a flight of three Republican Bréguet 19 light bombers and reconnaissance aircraft. Trautloft attacked one of the Republican aircraft, shooting it down near the village of Colmenar Viejo. This claim may have been the first aerial victory by a German pilot in Spain. Five days later, shortly after claiming a Potez 540 aircraft, Trautloft was himself shot down by a Dewoitine D.372, forcing him to bail out over Nationalist-held territory.

"Green Heart" of Thuringia

Following German recognition of Francisco Franco's government on 30 September, German efforts in Spain were reorganized and expanded, and the contingent of German forces was named Condor Legion by Hermann Göring. By October, the Condor Legion was augmented, receiving more equipment and men. This made it possible to split the fighter force in two, with Trautloft leading the detachment sent to Léon airfield. As the war escalated, the Soviet Union sent better planes to aid the Republicans. Among these were the Polikarpov I-15 and Polikarpov I-16 fighter aircraft, outclassing the German He-51s. By mid-November, the fighter force had increased and the Jagdgruppe 88 was created. In December, Versuchsjagdstaffel 88 (VJ/88), an experimental fighter squadron for testing new aircraft under operational conditions was created at Tablada. Trautloft was chosen as one of the pilots to test the then new Messerschmitt Bf 109. Trautloft had this aircraft personalized with the "Green Heart" of Thuringia. He wrote several recommendations on how to improve the design and combat operations of the Bf 109. On 2 March 1937, Trautloft who had claimed five aerial victories, left Spain and returned to Germany.

In 1937, Trautloft participated in the 4th international flight meeting held at the Dübendorf military airfield, Switzerland from 23 July to 1 August. Trautloft, Hauptmann Werner Restemeier and Oberleutnant Fritz Schleif, flying a flight of three BF 109 B-1s and B-2 took first place in the category Alpine flight.

On 15 March 1937, Trautloft was transferred and appointed Staffelkapitän (squadron leader) of 1. Staffel of Jagdgeschwader 135 (JG 135—135th Fighter Wing). This squadron was subordinated to I. Gruppe of JG 135 which had just been created on 15 March and was commanded by Major Max Ibel. Trautloft served in this capacity until 1 July 1938 when he was transferred to command the newly created 12. Staffel of Jagdgeschwader 132 (JG 132—132nd Fighter Wing), a squadron of IV. Gruppe headed by Oberstleutnant Theo Osterkamp. This Staffel was reassigned to 2. Staffel of Jagdgeschwader 331 (JG 331—331st Fighter Wing) on 3 November. With this unit, Trautloft participated in the German occupation of Czechoslovakia in March 1939. On 1 May, the squadron was again renamed, becoming 2. Staffel of Jagdgeschwader 77 (JG 77—77th Fighter Wing). In 1939, Trautloft published his Spanish War diaries named Als Jagdflieger in Spanien [As a Fighter Pilot in Spain] with a foreword by Ernst Udet.

== World War II ==
World War II in Europe had begun on Friday 1 September 1939 when German forces invaded Poland. In preparation for the invasion in end-August 1939, I. Gruppe of JG 77, to which the 2. Staffel was subordinated, had been moved from Breslau-Schöngarten to an airfield at Juliusburg, present-day Dobroszyce. The Gruppe operated over the left flank of Army Group South, supporting the 8th Army advance into Poland. Its main task was flying combat air patrols but had relatively little enemy contact, claiming three aerial victories, including one by Trautloft. On 5 September, Trautloft was credited with the destruction of a PZL.23 Karaś bomber near Warta, 15 kilometers (9.3 miles) northwest of Sieradz.

On 20 September, Trautloft was promoted to Hauptmann (captain) and appointed Gruppenkommandeur (group commander) of I. Gruppe of Jagdgeschwader 20 (JG 20—20th Fighter Wing) on 23 September. At the time of his posting to JG 20, the Gruppe had already been withdrawn from Poland and was based at Brandenburg-Briest. Subordinated to the Stab (headquarters unit) of Jagdgeschwader 2 "Richthofen" (JG 2—2nd Fighter Wing), I./JG 20 flew fighter protection over central Germany. On 6 November, the Gruppe was moved to Döberitz where it remained until 21 February 1940. That day, I./JG 20 was ordered to Bönninghardt and placed under the control of the Stab of Jagdgeschwader 51 (JG 51—51st Fighter Wing). There, the Gruppe patrolled Germany's western border during the "Phoney War" period of World War II.

=== Battle of France ===
Trautloft led I. Gruppe of JG 20 during the Battle of France which began on 10 May 1940. At the beginning of the campaign, I. Gruppe was still based at Bönninghardt and subordinated to JG 51. The Gruppe's area of operation was the Netherlands and northeastern Belgium, flying fighter escort missions for the bombers. On 16 May, the Gruppe was ordered to move to Eindhoven airfield where it remained until 20 May when it relocated to an airfield at Hoogerheide. From Hoogerheide, I. Gruppe initially flew missions to Bruges and on 24 May, the area of operations shifted towards Dunkirk and Calais. On the morning of 29 May, I./JG 20 moved further west to an airfield at Sint-Denijs-Westrem. That evening, Trautloft claimed a Royal Air Force (RAF) Supermarine Spitfire shot down southeast of Dunkirk. Two days later, Trautloft claimed another Spitfire during the Battle of Dunkirk. In preparation for Operation Paula on 3 June, I./JG 20 was ordered to Vitry-En-Artois and flew escort missions in the afternoon. It was then ordered back to Sint-Denijs-Westrem before moving to Saint-Omer to support Fall Rot, the second phase of the conquest of France.

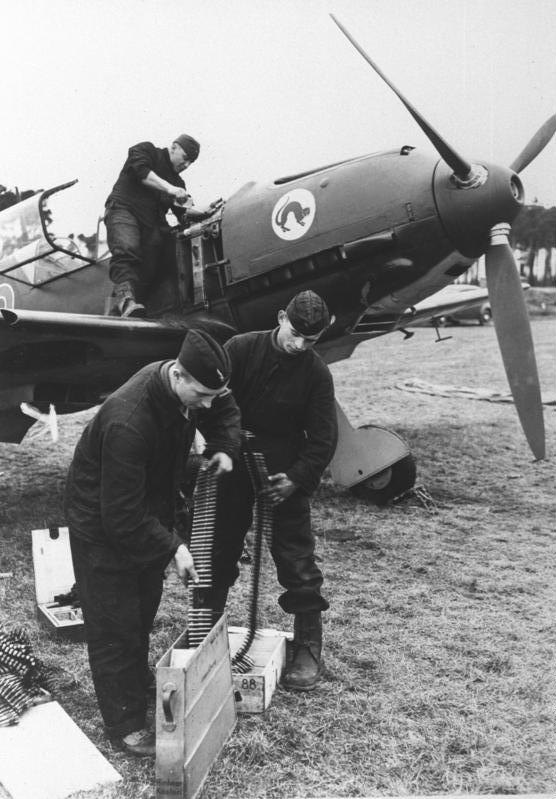
Bf 109 from JG 20

Supporting Army Group B, the Gruppe advanced to Estrées-lès-Crécy on 8 June and claimed its last aerial victory of the Battle of France on 13 June. The next day, I./JG 20 moved to an airfield southeast of Rouen and to Vouziers on 20 June. On 22 June, I./JG 20 returned to Saint-Omer where it patrolled the French coast on the English Channel. In total, I. Gruppe of JG 20 under Trautloft's command claimed 35 aerial victories during the Battle of France, losing five pilots killed in action, two were taken prisoner of war and three were wounded. In addition, ten Bf 109s were lost in combat. Following the armistice of 22 June 1940, the Battle of France ended on 25 June. By this date, the official allotted strength of I./JG 20 had been reduced to 60%.

=== Battle of Britain and Balkans campaign ===
On 4 July, I./JG 20 was officially integrated into JG 51 becoming its III. Gruppe. The end of the Battle of France marked the beginning of the Battle of Britain. The Gruppe received new aircraft during the second half of July, bringing its strength nearly to its allotment. On 19 July, III. Gruppe claimed the destruction of eleven Boulton Paul Defiant interceptor aircraft in aerial combat south of Folkestone, including one claim by Trautloft. According to British records, No. 141 Squadron lost six aircraft in this encounter. Trautloft claimed his last aerial victory with JG 51 on 8 August. That day, the Gruppe claimed five victories over RAF fighters, including a Spitfire near Dungeness by Trautloft.

In late August it was becoming apparent to the Oberkommando der Wehrmacht (German High Command) that the Battle of Britain was not going as planned. A frustrated Göring relieved several Geschwaderkommodore (wing commander) of their commands, and appointed younger, more aggressive men in their place. On 21 August the Luftwaffe communicated and continued with the changes which had started in June when Falck had been tasked with the creation of Nachtjagdgeschwader 1 (NJG 1—1st Night Fighter Wing). Lützow took command of Jagdgeschwader 3 (JG 3—3rd Fighter Wing), Adolf Galland was given command of Jagdgeschwader 26 "Schlageter" (JG 26—26th Fighter Wing), Werner Mölders was given command of JG 51, and Trautloft took over Jagdgeschwader 54 (JG 54—54th Fighter Wing) from Martin Mettig.

Command was transferred on 25 August and Trautloft was promoted to Major (major). At the time, JG 54 was based at Campagne-lès-Guines and also fighting against the RAF, either escorting bombers to England or flying combat air patrols. Trautloft claimed his first aerial victory with JG 54 that very same day. At 20:20, he claimed a Spitfire over the English Channel. Trautloft claimed two further aerial victories against the RAF, bringing his total to eight victories claimed during World War II. This includes a Hawker Hurricane shot down over Maidstone on 7 September, and a Spritfire claimed on 27 October over Ashford. On 15 September, the Luftwaffe embarked on an all-out attack against London which later dubbed the Battle of Britain Day. The next day, Trautloft met with his three group commanders at Campagne-lès-Guines, these were Hauptmann Hubertus von Bonin of I. Gruppe, Hauptmann Dietrich Hrabak of II. Gruppe, and the acting Gruppenkommandeur of III. Gruppe, Oberleutnant Günther Scholz. The topics of discussion where the poor radio discipline and the concern regarding overclaiming of aerial victories. On 2 November, Trautloft's Bf 109s E-3 (Werknummer 724—factory number) was damaged by a squib load but he managed to land the aircraft safely. On 20 November, the Geschwaderstab began transferring to Germany for a period of rest and maintenance, arriving at Dortmund Airfield on 3 December. The unit stayed in Dortmund until 15 January 1941, when it was ordered to Le Mans Airfield in France. On 29 March, JG 53 was withdrawn from France and ordered to Graz-Thalerhof in preparation for the Balkans campaign.

The Geschwaderstab remained in Graz-Thalerhof until 14 April and relocated to Deta. The next day, the Geschwaderstab moved again, this time to Pančevo Airfield where it remained until 19 April. Following the capitulation of Yugoslavia JG 54 was ordered to Belgrade. Trautloft's Bf 109s E-3 (Werknummer 724) was again damaged on 22 April in a forced landing at Pécs, following engine failure. On 25 April, JG 54 was ordered to return to Germany, arriving at Airfield Stolp-Reitz in Pomerania, present-day Słupsk, on 3 May. The Geschwaderstab did not claim any aerial victories during the Balkans campaign.

=== Operation Barbarossa ===
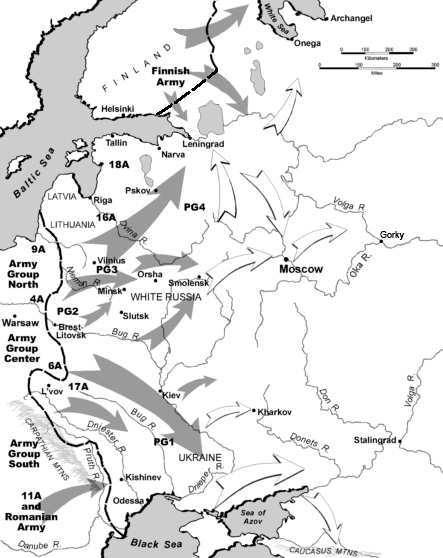
Map indicating Operation Barbarossa's attack plan

At Stolp-Reitz, JG 54 upgraded their aircraft to the Bf 109 F-2. For the next four weeks, the pilots familiarized themselves with the new aircraft before on 15 June, the Geschwaderstab was ordered to Trakehnen in preparation for Operation Barbarossa, the invasion of the Soviet Union. During the upcoming invasion, JG 54 would be deployed in the area of Army Group North, was subordinated to I. Fliegerkorps (1st Air Corps) and supported the 16th and 18th Army as well as the Panzer Group 4 in their strategic objective to reach Leningrad.

On 22 June, the day of the invasion, JG 54 was tasked with escorting German bombers from Kampfgeschwader 1, 76 and 77 (KG 1, KG 76 and KG 77—1st, 76th and 77th Bomber Wing) on their mission to bomb Soviet airfields near the Lithuanian border. On one of these missions, Trautloft claimed an Ilyushin DB-3 bomber shot down northwest of Marijampolė. The next day, he claimed a Tupolev SB bomber in the vicinity of Kussen in the Krasnoznamensky District. On 24 June, elements of JG 54 moved to Kaunas with the objective to achieve air supremacy over the combat area of Army Group North. Flying from Kaunas, Trautloft claimed two DB-3's, one on 24 June and another the next day. On 28 June, the Geschwaderstab was moved to Daugavpils, protecting the bridgehead on the eastern bank of the Daugava. On 30 June, the bridgehead came under heavy attack by Soviet bombers attacking German forces near the captured bridges over the Daugava. In defense of the bridgehead, Trautloft claimed two further DB-3's. That day, 1 Minno-torpednyy Aviatsionnyy (1 MTAP—1st minelaying and torpedo-bomber regiment) had dispatched 32 DB-3s which lost 15 aircraft in this engagement plus 10 further aircraft sustained combat damage.

On 27 July, Trautloft was awarded the Knight's Cross of the Iron Cross (Ritterkreuz des Eisernen Kreuzes) for 20 aerial victories claimed in World War II. The Geschwaderstab moved to Siversky on 7 September followed by I. and III. Gruppe a few days later. The airfield was located southwest of Leningrad and was equipped with hangars and buildings and JG 54 would be based there during the Siege of Leningrad. On 22 September, Trautloft visited the German front lines of the infantry and came under attack by strafing aircraft.

=== Eastern Front ===
On 5 December 1941, the Stavka (high command of the Soviet armed forces) launched a series of counter offensives named the winter campaign of 1941–42. Based at Siversky, JG 54 was the only fighter wing in the combat area of Army Group North, responsible for patrolling an area from Leningrad in the north to the Valdai Hills in the south, spanning a front line of approximately 400 km (250 mi). On 7 January 1942, the Stavka launched the Lyuban Offensive Operation which was fought on the southern shore of Lake Ladoga, near Lyuban. The attack began north of Novgorod and aimed at encircling elements of the German 18th Army with the objective to break the German siege of Leningrad. This attack forced Trautloft to largely commit JG 54 to the defense of this attack. Subsequently, most of the missions flown in January and February where over the Volkhov River, connecting Lake Ilmen and Lake Ladoga, although some missions where still flown over Leningrad. By early March, JG 54 had replaced its Bf 109 F-2 aircraft with the newer Bf 109 F-4 variant. On 6 March, Trautloft claimed a Polikarpov R-5 reconnaissance bomber aircraft near Chudovo. He was credited with an aerial victory over a I-16 on 9 March and a Yakovlev Yak-1 five days later. On 15 March, German forces launched a counterattack leading the encirclement of the Soviet 2nd Shock Army on 19 March. During this counter offensive, Trautloft claimed two further victories.

On 9 May, Trautloft claimed a Yak-1 fighter and a Petlyakov Pe-2 bomber in the combat area south-southwest of Valday and east of Demyansk, following the relief of the Kholm Pocket. The Geschwaderstab returned to Siversky on 15 May.

=== Luftwaffe commander ===
On 6 July 1943 Trautloft was appointed as Jagdflieger Inspizient Ost, serving with the General der Jagdflieger office. This position put him in overall charge as Inspector of all the Fighter aircraft units fighting on the Eastern Front. On 20 November, Trautloft succeeded Günther Lützow as Inspekteur der Tagjäger, giving him overall responsibilities for all day-fighters. On 11 November, Göring, in his role as commander-in-chief of the Luftwaffe, organized a meeting of high-ranking Luftwaffe officers, including Trautloft. The meeting, also referred to as the "Areopag" was held at the Luftkriegsakademie (air war academy) at Berlin-Gatow. This Luftwaffe version of the Greek Areopagus—a court of justice—aimed at finding solutions to the deteriorating air war situation over Germany.

In late 1944, a rumor crossed Trautloft's desk that a large number of Allied airmen were being held at Buchenwald Concentration Camp. Trautloft decided to visit the camp and see for himself under the pretence of inspecting aerial bomb damage near the camp. Trautloft was about to leave the camp when captured US airman Bernard Scharf called out to him in fluent German from behind a fence. The SS guards tried to intervene but Trautloft pointed out that he out-ranked them and made them stand back. Scharf explained that he was one of more than 160 allied airmen imprisoned at the camp and begged Trautloft to rescue him and the other airmen. Trautloft's adjutant also spoke to the group's commanding officer, a NZ airman Phil Lamason. Disturbed by the event, Trautloft returned to Berlin and began the process to have the airmen transferred out of Buchenwald. Seven days before their scheduled execution, the airmen were taken by train by the Luftwaffe to Stalag Luft III.

In early 1945, Trautloft joined other high-ranking pilots in the "Fighter Pilots' Revolt incident" which escalated in a meeting with Göring on 22 January 1945. This was an attempt to reinstate Galland who had been dismissed for outspokenness regarding the Oberkommando der Luftwaffe (Luftwaffe high command), and had been replaced by Oberst Gordon Gollob as General der Jagdflieger. The meeting was held at the Haus der Flieger in Berlin and was attended by a number of high-ranking fighter pilot leaders which included Trautloft, Lützow, Hermann Graf, Gerhard Michalski, Helmut Bennemann, Kurt Bühligen, Erich Leie and Herbert Ihlefeld, and their antagonist Göring supported by his staff Brauchitsch and Karl Koller. The fighter pilots, with Lützow taking the lead as spokesman, criticized Göring and made him personally responsible for the decisions taken which contributed to the lost air war over Europe.

Following this incident, Trautloft was relieved of his position and sent to command the 4. Flieger-Schule Division (4th Pilot School Division) in Strassburg. He spent the remainder of the war there. Trautloft ended the war as an Oberst (colonel).

In the last days of the war he stole a small aircraft and flew it to land in a field between Blaichach and Sonthofen which was close to where his fiancé was living in the village of Oberstdorf. Joining up with her they hid in mountain huts, to avoid him being arrested by the occupying Allied troops and being sent to a detention camp. Once things had settled down they came down to the village and after registering with the authorities were able to live undisturbed in Oberstdorf.

== Later life ==
To support himself and his wife following the end of the war Trautloft, who had produced many caricatures on the subject of aviation in his youth created the two costumed children "Toni and Vroni" which became popular, appearing on postcards, maps and as dolls marketed by the Schildkröt company. His wife brought in additional income by providing tailoring services. Trautloft also designed an original scarf that served as admission to the German Alpine Ski Championships when they were held in Oberstdorf in 1949. In 1951 Trautloft and his family moved to Munich.

On 1 October 1957, Trautloft joined the new German Air Force, at the time referred to as the Bundesluftwaffe, of West Germany with the rank of Brigadegeneral. In 1961, he served as deputy Inspector of the Air Force. On 1 January 1962, Trautloft succeeded Generalmajor Hermann Plocher as commander of Luftwaffengruppe Süd (Air Force Group South) in Karlsruhe. Trautloft was retired on 26 June 1970 with a Großer Zapfenstreich (Grand Tattoo), holding the rank of Generalleutnant. That day, he was awarded the Great Cross of Merit with Star of the Order of Merit of the Federal Republic of Germany (Großes Verdienstkreuz mit Stern des Verdienstorden der Bundesrepublik Deutschland) for his service in Bundesluftwaffe. He was an active member of many veteran organizations including the Gemeinschaft der Jagdflieger until his death on 12 January 1995 at Bad Wiessee in Bavaria.

== Personal life ==
While he was in his early twenties he became romantically involved with Marga Mayser. Marga's mother Helene was Jewish which according to the Nazi government's Nuremberg Laws meant that Marga was classified as a first-degree Mischling and thus prohibited from marrying Trautloft. In 1800, Marga's family had founded Mayser Hats, one of Germany's largest hat manufacturers, in Ulm. To keep a low profile Marga and her parents moved to Oberstdorf in 1943. Upon registering with the mayor of Oberstdorf, he helped them by not adding the legally-required name "Sara" in Helene Mayser's registration. This name had been added to Jewish women's surnames since 1938, and its omission was illegal.

After the end of the war Trautloft and Marga married and had a daughter.

== Summary of military career ==
=== Aerial victory claims ===
According to US historian David T. Zabecki, Trautloft was credited with 58 aerial victories, five during the Spanish Civil War. Mathews and Foreman, authors of Luftwaffe Aces — Biographies and Victory Claims, researched the German Federal Archives and found records for 58 aerial victory claims, plus three further unconfirmed claims. This number includes five claims during the Spanish Civil War, eight on the Western Front and 45 on the Eastern Front of World War II.

Victory claims were logged to a map-reference (PQ = Planquadrat), for example "PQ 36 Ost 10523". The Luftwaffe grid map (Jägermeldenetz) covered all of Europe, western Russia and North Africa and was composed of rectangles measuring 15 minutes of latitude by 30 minutes of longitude, an area of about 360 square miles (930 km^{2}). These sectors were then subdivided into 36 smaller units to give a location area 3 km × 4 km (1.9 mi × 2.5 mi) in size.

Chronicle of aerial victories
This and the – (dash) indicates unconfirmed aerial victory claims for which Trautloft did not receive credit.
Spanish Civil War
– Jagdgruppe 88 – Spanish Civil War — August – December 1936
| 1 | 25 August 1936 | — | Bréguet 19 | | 4 | 30 September 1936 | — | Potez 540 | |
| 2 | 30 August 1936 | — | Potez 540 | | 5 | 8 December 1936 | — | I-16 | |
| 3 | 1 September 1936 | — | NiD 52 | | | | | | |
World War II
– 2. Staffel of Jagdgeschwader 77 – Invasion of Poland — 1 – 23 September 1939
| 1 | 5 September 1939 | 08:20 | PZL P.23 | Warta, 15 km (9.3 mi) northwest of Sieradz | | | | | |
– Stab I. Gruppe of Jagdgeschwader 20 – Battle of France — 10 May – 25 June 1940
| 2 | 29 May 1940 | 18:40 | Spitfire | southeast of Dunkirk | 3 | 31 May 1940 | 18:06 | Spitfire | north of Dunkirk |
– Stab III. Gruppe of Jagdgeschwader 51 – At the Channel and over England — 26 June – 24 August 1940
| 4 | 19 July 1940 | 13:42 | Defiant | south of Folkestone | 5 | 8 August 1940 | 12:48 | Spitfire | Dungeness |
– Stab of Jagdgeschwader 54 – At the Channel and over England — 25 August 1940 – 29 March 1941
| 6 | 25 August 1940 | 20:20 | Spitfire | English Channel | 8 | 27 October 1940 | 15:05 | Spitfire | Ashford |
| 7 | 7 September 1940 | 19:00 | Hurricane | Maidstone | | | | | |
– Stab of Jagdgeschwader 54 – Operation Barbarossa — 22 June – 5 December 1941
| 9 | 22 June 1941 | 16:48 | DB-3 | northwest of Marijampolė | — | 24 July 1941 | — | SB-3 | |
| 10 | 23 June 1941 | 10:15 | SB-3 | Kussen | 20 | 24 July 1941 | 20:00 | SB-3 | east of Dno |
| 11 | 24 June 1941 | 19:30 | DB-3 | north of Tauragė | — | 17 September 1941 | — | I-18 (MiG-1) | |
| 12 | 25 June 1941 | 09:30 | DB-3 | south of Šiauliai | 21 | 4 October 1941 | 10:40 | I-26 (Yak-1) | Leningrad/Lyuban |
| 13 | 30 June 1941 | 15:10 | DB-3 | north of Daugavpils | 22 | 7 October 1941 | 15:10 | I-16 | Smolino |
| 14 | 30 June 1941 | 15:30 | DB-3 | north of Daugavpils | 23 | 7 October 1941 | 15:15 | I-18 (MiG-1) | Smolino |
| 15 | 6 July 1941 | 19:10 | SB-2 | southeast of Ostrov | 24 | 25 October 1941 | 09:38 | Pe-2 | Budogoshch |
| 16 | 13 July 1941 | 17:34 | I-18 (MiG-1) | northeast of Soltsy | 25 | 25 October 1941 | 14:26 | SB-2 | northeast of the Oskuya River |
| 17 | 14 July 1941 | 18:12 | I-18 (MiG-1) | southeast of Kingisepp | 26 | 29 October 1941 | 11:07 | I-26 (Yak-1) | off Tikhvin |
| 18 | 21 July 1941 | 21:00 | SB-2 | Waluj | — | 8 November 1941 | — | I-26 (Yak-1) | |
| 19 | 24 July 1941 | 19:52 | SB-3 | east of Porkhov | | | | | |
– Stab of Jagdgeschwader 54 – Eastern Front — 6 December 1941 – 30 April 1942
| 27 | 6 March 1942 | 10:00 | R-5 | Chudovo | 33 | 29 March 1942 | 15:38 | I-18 (MiG-1) | Staraya Russa |
| 28 | 9 March 1942 | 10:20 | I-16 | Lyuban | 34 | 1 April 1942 | 15:42 | Il-2 | Staraya Russa |
| 29 | 14 March 1942 | 09:14 | I-26 (Yak-1) | Novgorod | 35 | 1 April 1942 | 15:50 | Il-2 | Staraya Russa |
| 30 | 16 March 1942 | 14:58 | I-26 (Yak-1) | Malaya Vishera | 36 | 4 April 1942 | 14:30 | I-301 (LaGG-3) | Metino |
| 31 | 18 March 1942 | 10:42 | I-18 (MiG-1) | Novgorod | 37 | 4 April 1942 | 14:33 | I-301 (LaGG-3) | east of Chudovo |
| 32 | 20 March 1942 | 16:10 | I-18 (MiG-1) | Malaya Vishera | 38 | 5 April 1942 | 11:30 | I-61 (MiG-3) | Fedosina |
– Stab of Jagdgeschwader 54 – Eastern Front — 1 May 1942 – 3 February 1943
| 39 | 9 May 1942 | 15:50 | Yak-1 | Mury | 43 | 9 August 1942 | 10:00 | Pe-2 | 20 km (12 mi) northeast of Rzhev |
| 40 | 9 May 1942 | 16:10 | Pe-2 | 40 km (25 mi) south-southwest of Valday | 44 | 22 August 1942 | 10:15 | LaGG-3 | 15 km (9.3 mi) north of Ulyanovo |
| 41 | 30 May 1942 | 09:24 | MiG-3 | Malaya Vishera | 45 | 28 August 1942 | 05:12 | LaGG-3 | north of Rzhev |
| 42 | 5 August 1942 | 18:35 | Pe-2 | 15 km (9.3 mi) southeast of Shimsk | 46 | 17 January 1943 | 10:01 | Il-2 | 3 km (1.9 mi) north of Mga |
– Stab of Jagdgeschwader 54 – Eastern Front — 4 February – 5 July 1943
| 47 | 14 February 1943 | 14:10 | Il-2 | PQ 36 Ost 10523, 12 km (7.5 mi) north of Lyuban | 51 | 17 February 1943 | 15:02 | Il-2 | PQ 36 Ost 10522, 15 km (9.3 mi) north of Lyuban |
| 48 | 14 February 1943 | 14:15 | Il-2 | PQ 36 Ost 10562, 10 km (6.2 mi) northeast of Lyuban | 52 | 18 February 1943 | 09:50 | Il-2 | PQ 36 Ost 10382, 20 km (12 mi) north of Lyuban |
| 49 | 14 February 1943 | 14:30 | Il-2 m.H. (Note: The "m.H." refers to an Ilyushin Il-2 with rear gunner (mit Heckschütze).) | PQ 36 Ost 10524, 15 km (9.3 mi) north of Lyuban | 53 | 7 March 1943 | 14:10 | Il-2 | PQ 35 Ost 18324; 20 km (12 mi) south of Staraya Russa |
| 50 | 15 February 1943 | 09:28 | P-51 | PQ 36 Ost 00444, 10 km (6.2 mi) east of Ulyanovka | | | | | |

=== Awards ===
- Spanish Cross in Gold with Swords (14 April 1939)
- Iron Cross (1939) 2nd and 1st Class
- Knight's Cross of the Iron Cross on 27 July 1941 as Major and Geschwaderkommodore of Jagdgeschwader 54
- German Cross in Gold on 27 July 1942 as Major in Jagdgeschwader 54
- Great Cross of Merit with Star (26 June 1970)

== Works ==
- Trautloft, Hannes (1940). Als Jagdflieger in Spanien: Aus dem Tagebuch eines deutschen Legionärs [As a Fighter Pilot in Spain: From the Diary of a German Legionnaire]. Berlin: A. Nauck & Co. OCLC 258407474

== Notes ==
Military offices
| Preceded by Major Martin Mettig | Commander of Jagdgeschwader 54 Grünherz; 15 August 1940 – 5 July 1943 | Succeeded by Major Hubertus von Bonin |
| Preceded by Brigadegeneral Lothar von Heinemann | Deputy Inspector of the Air Force; 1 November 1960 – 31 August 1961 | Succeeded by Brigadegeneral Kurt Kuhlmey |
