= Günther Lützow =

German officer and fighter pilot

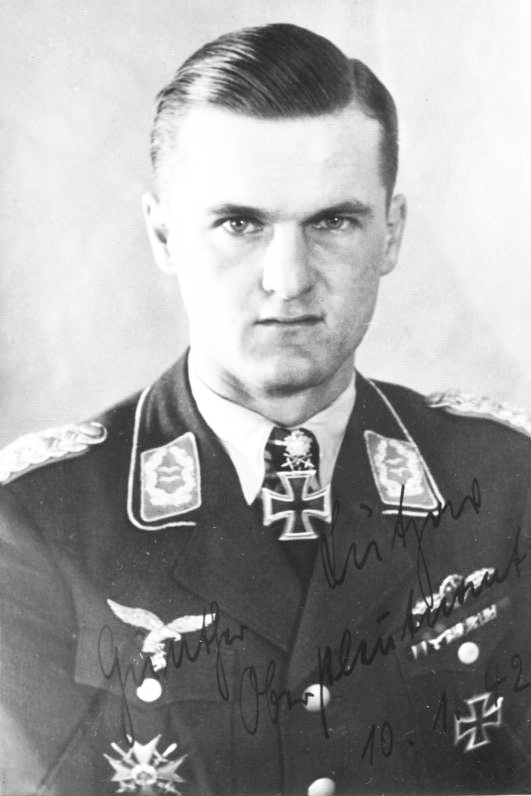
- Lützow as Oberstleutnant
- Born: 4 September 1912; Kiel, Kingdom of Prussia, German Empire
- Died: 24 April 1945 (aged 32) near Schrobenhausen, Free State of Bavaria, Nazi Germany
- Relatives: Friedrich Lützow (father); Kurt von Priesdorff (father-in-law); Eberhard Kinzel (uncle)
- Military career
- Allegiance: Weimar Republic (to 1933); Nazi Germany
- Branch: Reichsheer (1931–35); Luftwaffe (1935–45)
- Service years: 1931–1945
- Rank: Oberst (Colonel)
- Nickname: Franz or Franzl
- Units: J/88, JG 3, JG 51, JV 44
- Commands: 2. J/88; I./JG 3, JG 3, JG 51
- Conflicts: Spanish Civil War; World War II; Battle of France; Battle of Britain; Operation Barbarossa; Defense of the Reich (KIA)
- Awards: Spanish Cross in Gold with Swords and Diamonds; Knight's Cross of the Iron Cross with Oak Leaves and Swords

Günther Lützow (4 September 1912 – 24 April 1945) was a German Luftwaffe aviator and fighter ace credited with 110 enemy aircraft shot down in over 300 combat missions. Apart from five victories during the Spanish Civil War, most of his claimed victories were over the Eastern Front in World War II. He also claimed 20 victories over the Western Front, including two victories—one of which was a four-engined bomber—flying the Messerschmitt Me 262 jet fighter.

Born in Kiel, Lützow volunteered for military service in the Reichswehr of the Weimar Republic in 1931. In parallel, he was accepted for flight training with the Deutsche Verkehrsfliegerschule, a covert military-training organization, and at the Lipetsk fighter-pilot school. Following flight training, he was posted to Jagdgeschwader Richthofen (Fighter Wing "Richthofen") in 1934. In 1937, he volunteered for service with the Condor Legion during the Spanish Civil War where he was appointed Staffelkapitän (squadron leader) in Jagdgruppe 88 (J/88—88th Fighter Group). From April to September 1937, he claimed five aerial victories. For his service in Spain he was awarded the Spanish Cross in Gold with Swords and Diamonds, Germany's highest decoration of the Spanish Civil War.

After an assignment as fighter pilot instructor, he was appointed Gruppenkommandeur (group commander) in Jagdgeschwader 3 (JG 3—3rd Fighter Wing) following the outbreak of World War II. He led the Gruppe through the Battle of France and claimed his first victory of World War II on 14 May 1940. Lützow became Geschwaderkommodore (wing commander) of JG 3 on 21 August 1940. After 15 aerial victories during the Battle of Britain, he was awarded the Knight's Cross of the Iron Cross on 18 September 1940. Lützow commanded JG 3 in the aerial battles of Operation Barbarossa, the German invasion of the Soviet Union. There, after his 42nd aerial victory, he was awarded the Knight's Cross of the Iron Cross with Oak Leaves on 20 July 1941. Three months later, following his 92nd aerial victory of the war, Lützow was awarded the Knight's Cross of the Iron Cross with Oak Leaves and Swords on 11 October 1941. On 24 October, he claimed his 100th victory of the war, becoming the second fighter pilot after Werner Mölders to do so. From September to November 1941, he also served as acting commander of Jagdgeschwader 51 (JG 51—51st Fighter Wing), replacing Friedrich Beckh, who had been injured in combat, until the position was filled by Karl-Gottfried Nordmann. After being instructed not to fly operations, he ignored the order, adding two more victories before being posted on 11 August 1942 to the staff of General der Jagdflieger (General of Fighters) Adolf Galland, serving as "Inspector of Day Fighters, East".

In July 1943, Lützow was tasked with commanding fighter operations in Italy. From September 1943 to March 1944, he led the 1. Jagd Division (1st Fighter Division), commanding all day- and night-fighter operations in northwestern Germany, the Netherlands and Belgium. Lützow's role in the "Fighter Pilots Revolt" was considered mutiny by Hermann Göring, who exiled Lützow to Italy. In April 1945, he joined Galland's Jagdverband 44 (JV 44—44th Fighter Detachment). He was reported missing in action flying the Me 262 on 24 April 1945 while attempting to intercept a U.S. Army Air Forces Martin B-26 Marauder raid near Donauwörth. His body was never recovered.

== Early life and career ==
Lützow was born on 4 September 1912 in Kiel, at the time the capital of the Province of Schleswig-Holstein, a province of the Kingdom of Prussia. He was the third of five children of Friedrich Lützow, a naval officer, and his wife Hildegard, née Kinzel. He had an older brother, Werner, (Note: His brother Werner served as a Korvettenkapitän (corvette captain) in the Kriegsmarine. His last command was chief of the 4. Schnellbootflottille. On 24 November 1943, he was killed in action in the Thames Estuary on board Schnellboot S-88.) an older sister, Liselotte (Elisabeth Charlotte), a younger sister, Hildegard, and a younger brother, Joachim. The family at the time lived at the Reventlouallee 23 on the west bank of the Kieler Förde. This was close to the German Imperial Naval Academy where his father attended a two-year Admiralty Staff training course. Following the outbreak of World War I, his father was posted to the staff of the Führer der Unterseeboote (Commander of Submarines) Fregattenkapitän (Frigate Captain) Hermann Bauer, and the family had to move to Wilhelmshaven.

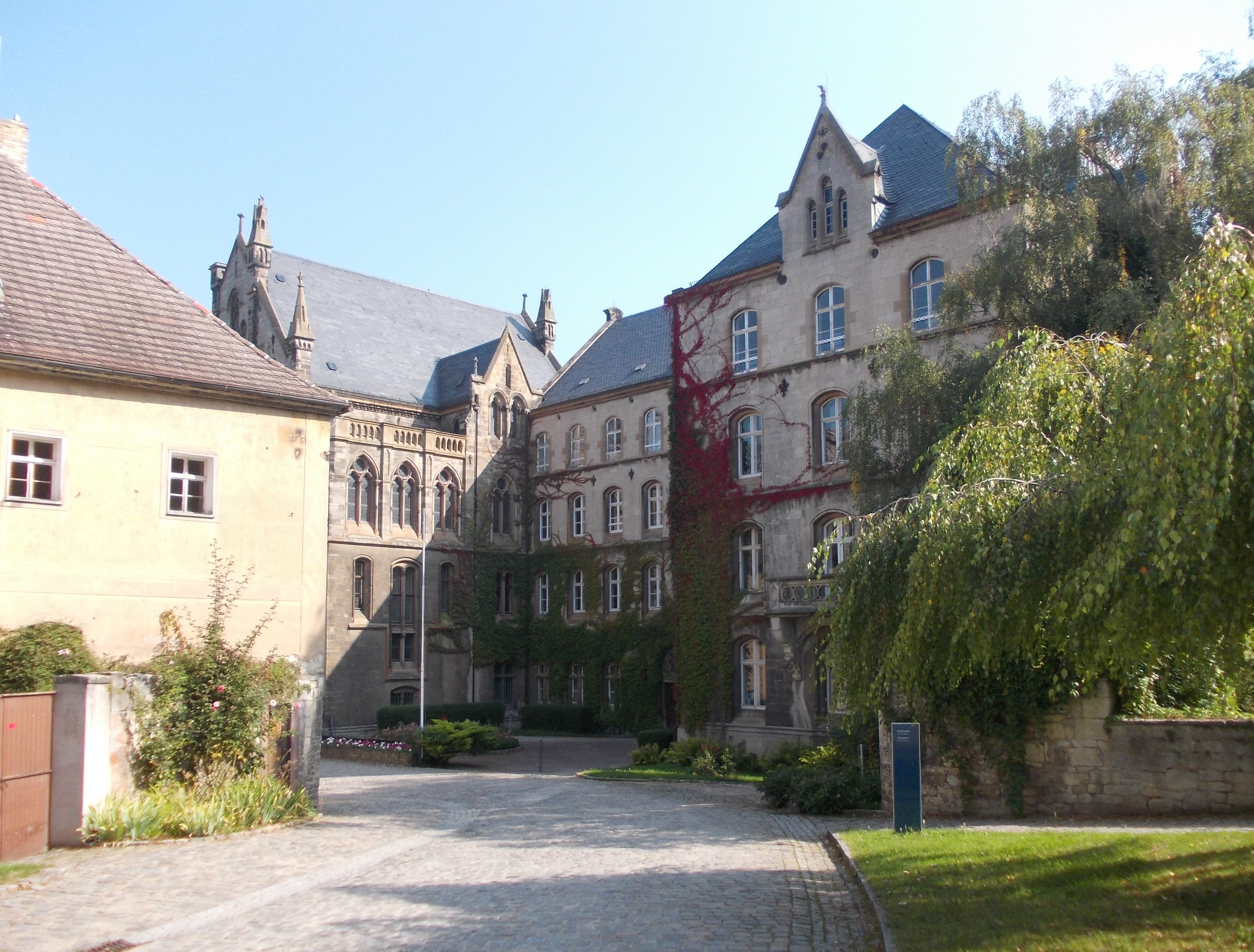
Schulpforta main building, 2014

Lützow graduated with his Abitur (university-preparatory high school diploma) on 31 March 1931 from the Schulpforta, a boarding school for academically gifted students. Unlike his brothers, who both pursued a naval career, Lützow joined the Reichswehr (Army of the Weimar Republic) following his graduation from school. This decision had been influenced by his mother's youngest brother, Eberhard Kinzel, at the time an officer in the Reichswehr and later General der Infanterie (General of the Infantry) in the Heer (German Army).

On 7 April 1931 Lützow began his pilot training at the Deutsche Verkehrsfliegerschule (DVS—German Air Transport School) at Schleißheim. The DVS was headed by Carl Bolle, a World War I fighter pilot, and his flight instructor was Wilhelm Stör, another World War I fighter pilot. He and 29 other trainees were part of Kameradschaft 31 (camaraderie of 1931), abbreviated "K 31". Among the members of "K 31" were future Luftwaffe staff officers Bernd von Brauchitsch, Wolfgang Falck, Günther Radusch, Ralph von Rettberg and Hannes Trautloft. Lützow graduated from the DVS on 19 February 1932. In late September 1931, Lützow and three other students made a cross-country flight from Schleißheim to Berlin. The flight was made in two 2-seater Klemm Kl 26 training aircraft. Lützow, as the best air navigation student of his class, flew in the navigator's position. In the Luftstreitkräfte of World War I, the pilot was called "Emil" and the navigator was called "Franz". From that point on, Lützow was nicknamed "Franz" or the diminutive "Franzl" (little Franz). From "K 31", Lützow and nine others were recommended for Sonderausbildung (special training) at the Lipetsk fighter-pilot school.

Following his return from flight training, Lützow joined 5. (Preußisches) Infanterie-Regiment (5th (Prussian) Infantry Regiment), at first in Greifswald (15 October 1932 – 31 January 1933) as an Offizieranwärter (officer candidate). There he completed his basic training. From 1 February to 31 March 1933, he served with 5. (Preußisches) Infanterie-Regiment in Stettin. He then attended the Kriegsschule (war school) in Dresden and was promoted to Leutnant (second lieutenant) on 1 October 1934. In 1935, he officially transferred to the newly formed Luftwaffe, at first serving as a fighter pilot instructor at Schleißheim (8 March 1935 – 31 March 1936) followed by a posting to II. Gruppe (2nd group) of Sturzkampfgeschwader 162 (StG 162—162nd Diver Bomber Wing) at Lübeck-Blankensee (1 April – 3 November 1936). In parallel, from 1 May to 1 November 1936, Lützow held the position of Staffeloffizier (squadron officer) with 4. Staffel (4th squadron) of Jagdgeschwader 132 "Richthofen" (JG 132—132nd Fighter Wing) at Jüterbog-Damm Airfield in Jüterbog.

== Spanish Civil War ==
During the Spanish Civil War, Lützow volunteered for service with the Condor Legion, a unit composed of volunteers from the Luftwaffe and from the Heer which served with the Nationalists. On 19 March 1937, he was appointed Staffelkapitän (squadron leader) of 2. Staffel (2nd squadron) of Jagdgruppe 88 (J/88—88th Fighter Group).

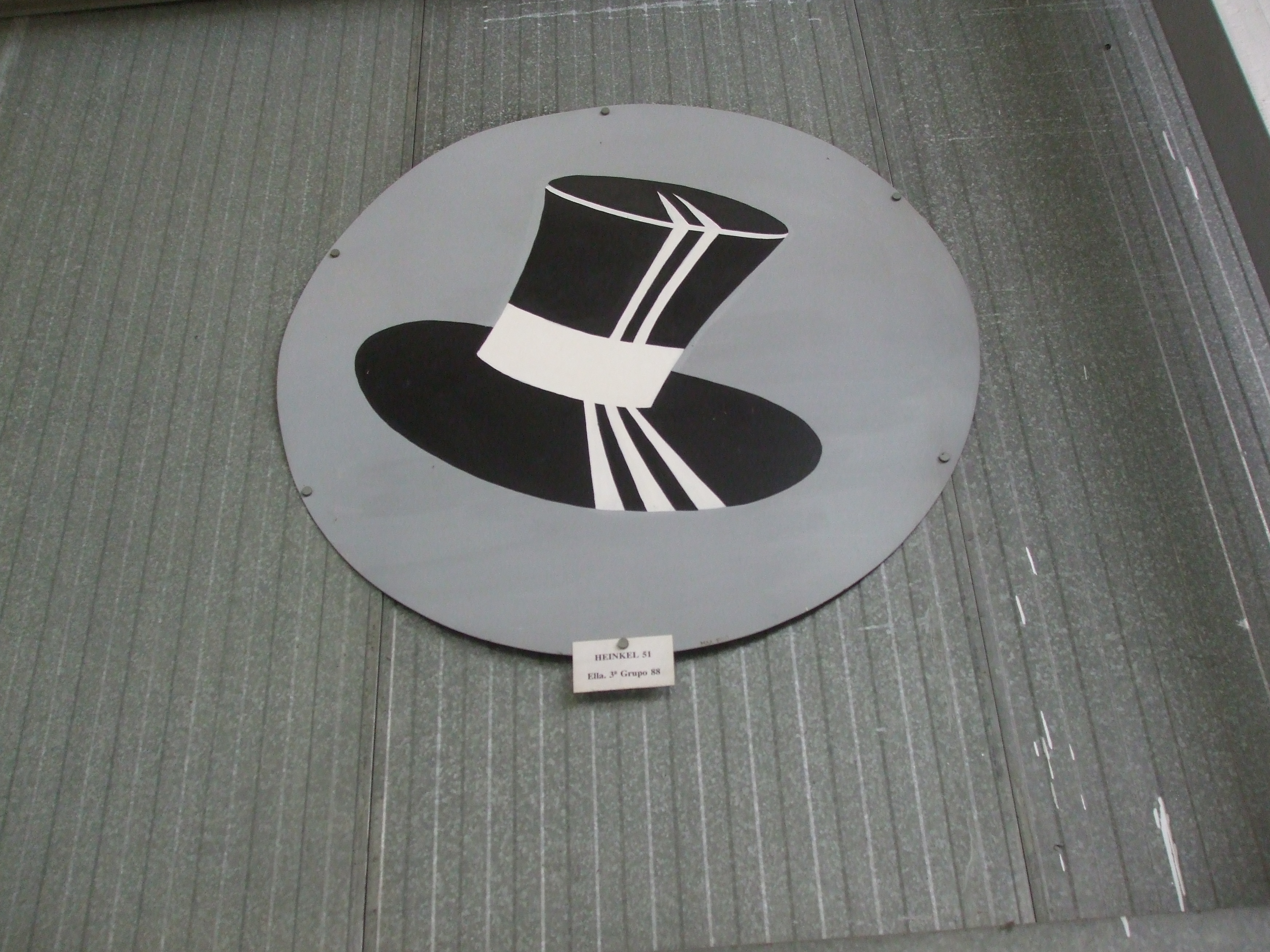
2. Staffel insignia

From March to September 1937, Lützow, now an Oberleutnant (first lieutenant), claimed five victories, including the first ever recorded claim by a Messerschmitt Bf 109 pilot. Flying a Bf 109 B, he shot down a Polikarpov I-15, a Soviet built biplane fighter aircraft, on 6 April 1937. On 26 April 1937, air elements of the Condor Legion targeted and bombed Guernica, an attack which has been characterised as a war crime by Wette and Ueberschär, but Lützow did not participate in the attack as he was on home leave from 8–29 April 1937. (Note: Supported by the Italian Aviazione Legionaria (Legionary Air Force), the attack was carried out by 26 bombers, escorted by 16 fighter aircraft from 1. and Lützow's 2. Staffel of J/88. The bombers struck the bridges, the center of Guernica and areas to the south. Up to 1,500 people were reported killed or wounded during the attack. 2. Staffel strafed people trying to escape from the attack.) After he returned, Lützow claimed three more I-15s shot down, one on 22 May, another on 28 May, and his last on 18 August 1937. His final aerial victory in Spain was over a Polikarpov I-16, a monoplane fighter aircraft, which he shot down on 22 August 1937.

On 16 October 1937, Lützow was assigned to the Reichsluftfahrtministerium (RLM—Ministry of Aviation) Sonderstab W. (special staff "W") under the command of and named after General Helmuth Wilberg. Sonderstab W. was responsible for collecting and analyzing the tactical lessons of the Spanish Civil War. Lützow wrote up his report, Erfahrungsbericht Winterausbildung 1937/1938, Jüterbog-Damm, 5. Staffel (field report winter training 1937/1938, Jüterbog-Damm, 5th squadron) documenting his Spanish experiences and tactical proposals. His report referred to the finger-four formation as the clearly superior tactical formation for contemporary fighter operations. Lützow's comrade Werner Mölders solved the problem of manoeuvring a finger-four formation months later by introducing what is still known today as the "crossover turn" or "tac turn". At RLM, Lützow received his promotion to Hauptmann (captain) on 20 November 1937. For his achievements in Spain, Lützow was honored with the Spanish Medalla de la Campaña and Medalla Militar and the German Spanish Cross in Gold with Swords and Diamonds (Spanienkreuz in Gold mit Schwertern und Brillanten) on 6 June 1939.

On 12 February 1938, Lützow met his future wife Gisela von Priesdorff, the oldest daughter of military historian Kurt von Priesdorff, at a carnival party held at the Jagdfliegerschule 1 (fighter pilot school) at Werneuchen. On 19 July 1938 the two were officially engaged, and they married on 11 March 1939 at the Holy Trinity Church in Berlin. They had a son, Hans-Ulrich, born 29 January 1940, and a daughter, Carola, born 31 August 1942. On 1 November 1938, Lützow became a head flight instructor at Jagdfliegerschule 1 at Werneuchen, replacing Johannes Janke. At the time Jagdfliegerschule 1 was under the command of Theo Osterkamp, a World War I fighter pilot.

== World War II ==
World War II in Europe began on Friday 1 September 1939, when German forces invaded Poland. Lützow did not participate in this campaign. He was tasked with providing fighter protection for Berlin. From the Jagdfliegerschule in Werneuchen, he detached two squadrons and placed them under the command of Jagdgruppe 20 based at Strausberg. At the end of October 1939, a change in command of I. Gruppe (1st group) of Jagdgeschwader 3 (JG 3—3rd Fighter Wing) was announced. (Note: For an explanation of Luftwaffe unit designations see Organization of the Luftwaffe during World War II.) The former commander Oberstleutnant (Lieutenant Colonel) Otto-Heinrich von Houwald was transferred to the Jagdfliegerschule in Werneuchen. Lützow joined I. Gruppe on 1 November 1939, officially taking over command as Gruppenkommandeur (group commander) two days later.

=== Battle of France ===
On 10 May 1940, the Wehrmacht began its offensive Operation Case Yellow (Fall Gelb), the invasion of France and the neutral Low Countries. I. Gruppe of JG 3 participated in the offensive as a subordinated unit of Jagdgeschwader 77 (JG 77—77th Fighter Wing). During the Battle of France, JG 77 was under control of I. Fliegerkorps (1st Air Corps), which formed the right wing of Luftflotte 3 (3rd Air Fleet) in Belgium and the Netherlands.

On 14 May 1940, Lützow claimed his first two aerial victories of World War II. Flying out of Hargimont, his flight was tasked with providing fighter cover in the area northwest of Dinant. At 8:00 pm, the flight encountered 15 to 20 Armée de l'Air (French Air Force) Curtiss P-36 Hawk fighter aircraft. Without loss, I. Gruppe claimed seven Curtisses shot down, including two claimed by Lützow. The next day, he claimed another P-36 southeast of Charleroi, his third victory of the war. On 19 May in combat north of Arras, he claimed a Hawker Hurricane fighter aircraft. Lützow claimed his fifth and sixth victory of the war on 31 May 1940, shooting down two Morane-Saulnier M.S.406 fighter aircraft south of Amiens. This was followed by another P-36 on 3 June. On 6 June, he claimed a Bristol Blenheim light bomber followed by another Blenheim shot down on 8 June. This latter Blenheim was shot down when Lützow was returning from a Junkers Ju 87 dive bomber escort mission. The Blenheim IV was flying alone unescorted and Lützow set it on fire. The bomber exploded in midair near Abbeville.

On 23 June 1940, I. Gruppe was moved to a forward airfield at Grandvilliers in preparation for missions over the Channel Coast, but the following day, all Bf 109s were sent to Wiesbaden, via Brussels, for a thorough maintenance check. The overhaul detachment arrived in Wiesbaden in the late afternoon and the pilots were sent on home leave. The cease-fire of the Armistice of 22 June 1940 went into effect on 25 June 1940, ending the Battle of France. During the French campaign, Lützow flew 64 combat missions and claimed nine victories. Under his leadership, I. Gruppe was one of the most successful units in this campaign. It was credited with 88 aerial victories for the loss of six pilots killed and ten Bf 109s destroyed. (Note: According to Braatz, I. Gruppe was credited with 89 aerial victories for the loss of six pilots killed and 14 Bf 109s destroyed.)

By 3 July 1940, the majority of the Bf 109s had returned to Grandvilliers from maintenance overhaul. At the time, Lützow had 45 pilots and 33 Bf 109 Es for disposition, 28 of the aircraft being operational. I. Gruppe flew its first missions over the Channel Coast on the evening of 5 July 1940. In the following days flight operations were impeded by a period of bad weather. On 1 August 1940, I. Gruppe was moved to Colembert, the Geschwaderstab (headquarters unit) and the other two Gruppen were moved to airfields in the vicinity of Boulogne. In preparations for actions against Great Britain, JG 3 was put under the control of Luftflotte 2 (2nd Air Fleet), thus placing it under the command of Jagdfliegerführer 2 Oberst (Colonel) Osterkamp.

On 1 August 1940, Adolf Hitler had issued Führer Directive no. 17 (Weisung Nr. 17); the strategic objective of which was to engage and defeat the Royal Air Force (RAF) so as to achieve air superiority in preparation for Operation Sea Lion (Unternehmen Seelöwe), the proposed amphibious invasion of Great Britain. Reichsmarschall (Marshal of the Realm) Hermann Göring, in his role as commander-in-chief of the Luftwaffe ordered an attack on RAF Fighter Command's ground organization, code named Adlertag (Operation Eagle Attack). On 13 August, 485 bomber and approximately 1,000 fighter sorties were flown, targeting British airfields in southern England. Lützow claimed his first aerial victory in the Battle of Britain on 16 August 1940, shooting down a Supermarine Spitfire over Kent.

=== Wing commander of JG 3 ===
At the height of the Battle of Britain on 21 August 1940, it was announced that Lützow was to be appointed Geschwaderkommodore (wing commander) of JG 3. He officially took command of JG 3 on 25 August and was promoted to Major (major) on 30 August 1940. On 25 August, command of I. Gruppe was handed over to Oberleutnant Lothar Keller who led the Gruppe until the new Gruppenkommandeur Hauptmann Hans von Hahn arrived at the end of August. Lützow's former adjutant with I. Gruppe, Friedrich-Franz von Cramon, joined him at the Geschwaderstab and continued to serve as his adjutant. Under Lützow's command, the Geschwaderstab was based on the Channel Coast until 16 February 1941, at first in Colembert, then in August 1940 it was moved to Wierre-au-Bois and at the end of September to Desvres. Lützow, as Geschwaderkommodore, claimed eight victories during the Battle of Britain, his 11th–18th of the war.

On 26 August 1940, Lützow claimed a pair of Boulton Paul Defiant fighters from No. 264 Squadron off the north Kent coast. On 27 August 1940, Lützow, and other Geschwaderkommodore, were summoned to a meeting held by Jagdfliegerführer 2, Generalmajor (Major General) Kurt-Bertram von Döring in Wissant. This meeting was also attended by Generalfeldmarschall (Field Marshal) Albert Kesselring, and the commanding general of the II. Fliegerkorps Generaloberst (Colonel General) Bruno Loerzer. The subject of the meeting was the perceived lack of fighter protection provided for the bomber arm by the Jagdwaffe (fighter force). The bomber crews had demanded the fighter escorts fly closer to the bombers, within visual proximity, increasing perceived security of the bomber crews. The generals accused the Geschwaderkommodere of being overly interested in accumulating aerial victories and awards at the expense of exposing the bombers to enemy attacks. Lützow argued that a fighter aircraft, such as the Bf 109, required speed and space to combat the fast and more agile RAF fighter aircraft. The discussion ended with a compromise, some of the fighters were ordered to fly close and at the same speed as the bombers, while other fighters were to fly 1,000–2,000 meters (3,300–6,600 feet) above the main bomber force, clearing the airspace of enemy fighters in the direction the bomber force was flying.

In September 1940, Lützow claimed three Hurricanes, one each on 7, 9 and 15 September. In addition to the 15 aerial victories he had claimed since the start of the war, he was credited with three ground victories and one barrage balloon destroyed. Subsequently, he was awarded the Knight's Cross of the Iron Cross (Ritterkreuz des Eisernes Kreuzes) on 18 September 1940. The presentation was made by Göring at the headquarters of the Wehrmachtbefehlshaber Niederlande (Supreme Commander of the Wehrmacht in the Netherlands), General der Flieger (General of Aviators) Friedrich Christiansen, at Wassenaar near The Hague on 19 September. That day, both Lützow and Wolfgang Schellmann, Geschwaderkommodore of Jagdgeschwader 2 "Richthofen" (JG 2—2nd Fighter Wing), were so honored. Lützow was credited with three further victories against the RAF, two P-36s shot down on 5 October, and a Spitfire on 5 November 1940. These were his last victories claimed over the Western Front until 1945, taking his World War II score to 18.

In spring 1941, Geschwaderstab of JG 3 was transferred to Mannheim-Sandhofen for a period of rest and conversion to the new Bf 109 F-2. On 4 May 1941, the Geschwaderstab was sent back into combat along the Channel Coast. On 7 May 1941, Lützow's Bf 109 F-2 (Werknummer 8117—factory number) suffered minor damage in combat when his tail surfaces were shot up. Operating from Saint-Pol-Brias until 8 June, the Geschwaderstab flew missions over southern England and the English Channel without filing any claims or sustaining any losses.

=== War against the Soviet Union ===
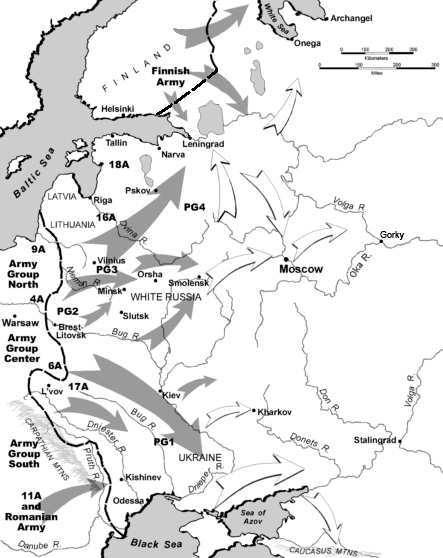
Map indicating Operation Barbarossa's attack plan

In preparation for Operation Barbarossa, the German invasion of the Soviet Union, the Geschwaderstab began heading east on 8 June 1941. They stopped for several days at Breslau-Gandau (now in Wrocław, Poland. On 18 June, the Geschwaderstab relocated to Hostynne, from where on 22 June 1941, Lützow led JG 3 in combat against the Soviet Union. At the start of the campaign, JG 3 was subordinated to the V. Fliegerkorps (5th Air Corps), under command of General der Flieger Robert Ritter von Greim, which was part of Luftflotte 4 (4th Air Fleet), under command of Generaloberst Alexander Löhr. These air elements supported Generalfeldmarschall Gerd von Rundstedt's Heeresgruppe Süd (Army Group South), with the objective of capturing Ukraine and its capital Kiev.

Lützow claimed nine aerial victories in his first week on the Eastern Front. The first victory, an I-18 fighter, a variant of the Polikarpov I-16, was achieved on the opening day of Barbarossa. On the second day of Barbarossa, he accounted for two Tupolev SB-2 bombers. On 24 June, he filed a claim for a Polikarpov I-153 biplane fighter destroyed. Two days later, he destroyed three aircraft, two SB-2 bombers and a Petlyakov Pe-2 ground attack aircraft. On 27 June, he shot down an Ilyushin DB-3 bomber followed by another Pe-2 on the following day, his last victory of June 1941. Following a DB-3 bomber claimed on 7 July, Lützow was credited with four aerial victories on 10 July, consisting of one Vultee V-11 attack aircraft and three I-153s. The next day he claimed an II-16. On 15 July he shot down two further I-16s and another DB-3 taking his total to 36 World War II victories.

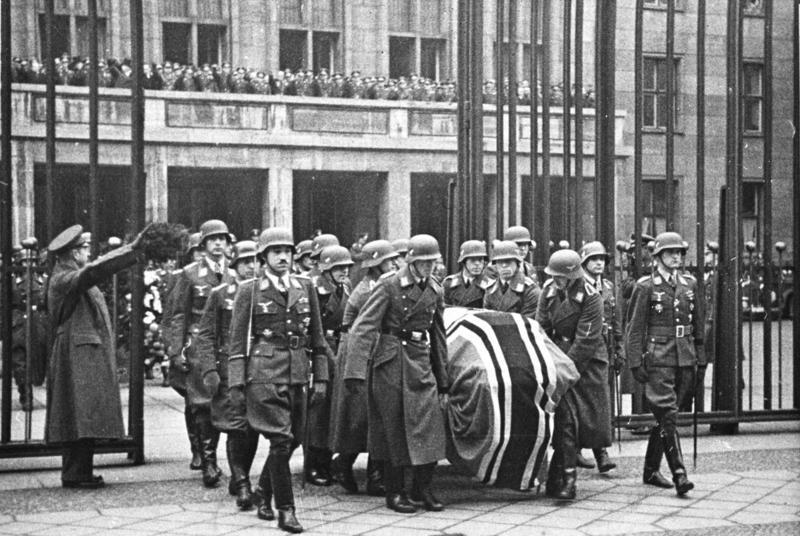
Lützow (front honor guard, right) at Udet's funeral.

On 16 July 1941, Lützow claimed three further victories—a SB-2, an I-16 and a DB-3—and another DB-3 the next day. On 20 July, he claimed his 42nd aerial victory of the war, two V-11s. On the same day he was awarded the Knight's Cross of the Iron Cross with Oak Leaves (Ritterkreuz des Eisernen Kreuzes mit Eichenlaub), and was the 27th member of the Wehrmacht so honored. The presentation of the Oak Leaves was made by Hitler at the Führer Headquarter Wolfsschanze (Wolf's Lair), Hitler's headquarters in Rastenburg, now Kętrzyn in Poland. Two other Luftwaffe officers were presented with awards that day by Hitler, Major Günther Freiherr von Maltzahn and Major Josef Priller were also awarded the Oak Leaves.

Major Friedrich Beckh, Geschwaderkommodore of Jagdgeschwader 51 (JG 51—51st Fighter Wing) at the time, was wounded in combat on 16 September. During Beckh's convalescence, Lützow temporarily commanded both JG 51 and JG 3 until 21 December when Beckh returned. On 23 September, Lützow suffered combat damage to his radiator and had to make a forced landing behind Soviet lines near Krasnograd. He managed to return to the German lines unhurt. In October he claimed 29 victories, including five bombers shot down on 8 October. He was awarded the Knight's Cross of the Iron Cross with Oak Leaves and Swords (Ritterkreuz des Eisernen Kreuzes mit Eichenlaub und Schwertern) on 11 October 1941 at which point he had accumulated 92 aerial victories since 1 September 1939. The presentation was made on 12 October 1941 by Hitler at the Wolfsschanze.

On 24 October 1941, Lützow became the second fighter pilot, after Mölders, to amass 100 aerial victories in World War II. Fearing his loss in combat, Lützow was then grounded, an order he did not always obey. In early November, he led Stab JG 3 back to Germany to rest and re-equip. During this period, Lützow participated in the honor guard for Generaloberst Ernst Udet. Udet had committed suicide on 17 November 1941 and on 1 December JG 3 received the honorary name "Udet". In May 1942 Lützow and JG 3 commenced operations near Kharkov before moving into the Crimea and operating around Stalingrad. Lützow added one victory when he claimed a Polikarpov I-16 fighter on 21 May 1942 for his 107th kill. On 11 August, Lützow handed over command of JG 3 to Hauptmann Wolf-Dietrich Wilcke.

According to Braatz, sometime in June 1942 (most likely in Grakowo, located between Kharkov and Kupiansk), Lützow was visited by two men from the SS. They were of lower rank. After Lützow asked them how he could be of assistance to them they responded by requesting as many of his men as possible to form up execution squads to liquidate Jews, Soviet Political Officers and other "scum". Lützow was furious and ordered the entire Geschwader in full dress uniform to assemble and before the Jagdgeschwader he explained what the SS had requested and how he considered this act to be barbaric and criminal. He threatened to resign from command and take off his uniform if a single soldier volunteered. Braatz speculated whether this act got Lützow into trouble with the SS and the NSDAP.

=== Luftwaffe commander ===
In August 1942, Lützow was posted to the staff of General der Jagdflieger (General of Fighters) Adolf Galland as Inspector of Day Fighters, Eastern Area. Braatz argues that Galland's decision to appoint Lützow to this position may have been motivated by a desire to get him out of the "line of fire" from the SS and NSDAP. On 1 April 1943, Lützow was promoted to Oberst (colonel).

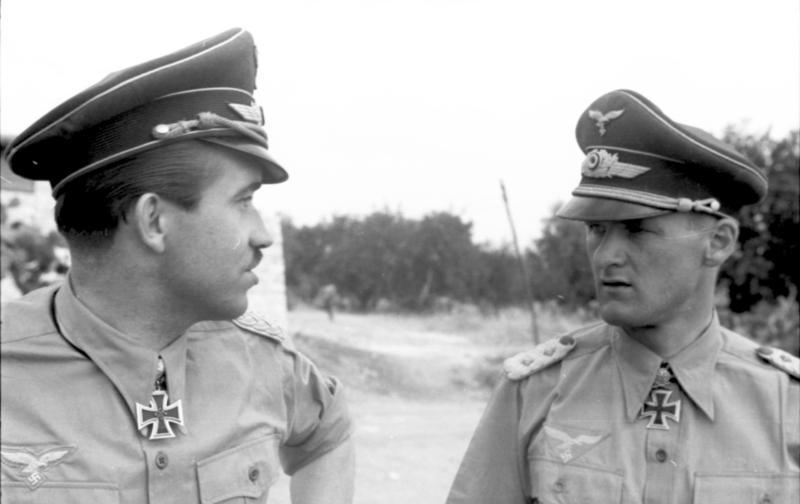
Adolf Galland and Günther Lützow in Italy

In July 1943, Lützow became Inspector of Day Fighters, Italian Front, based in Naples. From September 1943 to March 1944, he commanded the 1. Jagd-Division (1st Fighter Division) in Defense of the Reich at Döberitz, where he assumed command for day- and night-fighter operations in northwestern Germany, the Netherlands and Belgium. 1. Jagd-Division was under control of 1. Jagd-Korps (1st Fighter Corps) commanded by Generalmajor Joseph Schmid. Lützow was relieved of this command on 16 March 1944 due to personal differences with Schmid. Following his dismissal, he was given command of the 4. Flieger-Schuldivision (4th Flyers Training Division).

=== Dismissal and death ===
Lützow became known as a central figure and spokesman behind the Fighter Pilots' Mutiny which escalated in a meeting with Göring on 22 January 1945. This was an attempt to reinstate Galland who had been dismissed for outspokenness regarding the Oberkommando der Luftwaffe (Luftwaffe high command), and had been replaced by Oberst Gordon Gollob as General der Jagdflieger. The meeting was held at the Haus der Flieger in Berlin and was attended by a number of high-ranking fighter pilot leaders which included Lützow, Hermann Graf, Gerhard Michalski, Helmut Bennemann, Kurt Bühligen, Erich Leie and Herbert Ihlefeld, and their antagonist Göring supported by his staff Brauchitsch and Karl Koller. The fighter pilots, with Lützow taking the lead as spokesman, criticized Göring and made him personally responsible for the decisions taken which effectively had led to the lost air war over Europe. This behavior, the fact that someone dared to criticize Göring in his leadership abilities, was regarded as mutiny by Göring, who relieved him of command and had him posted to Italy to take over Jagdfliegerführer Oberitalien (Fighter Leader Northern Italy) from Oberst Eduard Neumann. Göring exiled Lützow from Germany by placing him under "Reichsacht" (lit. "Ban from the Reich"). He was not allowed to inform his secretary in Jüterbog nor his wife back home, he had to leave Germany immediately.

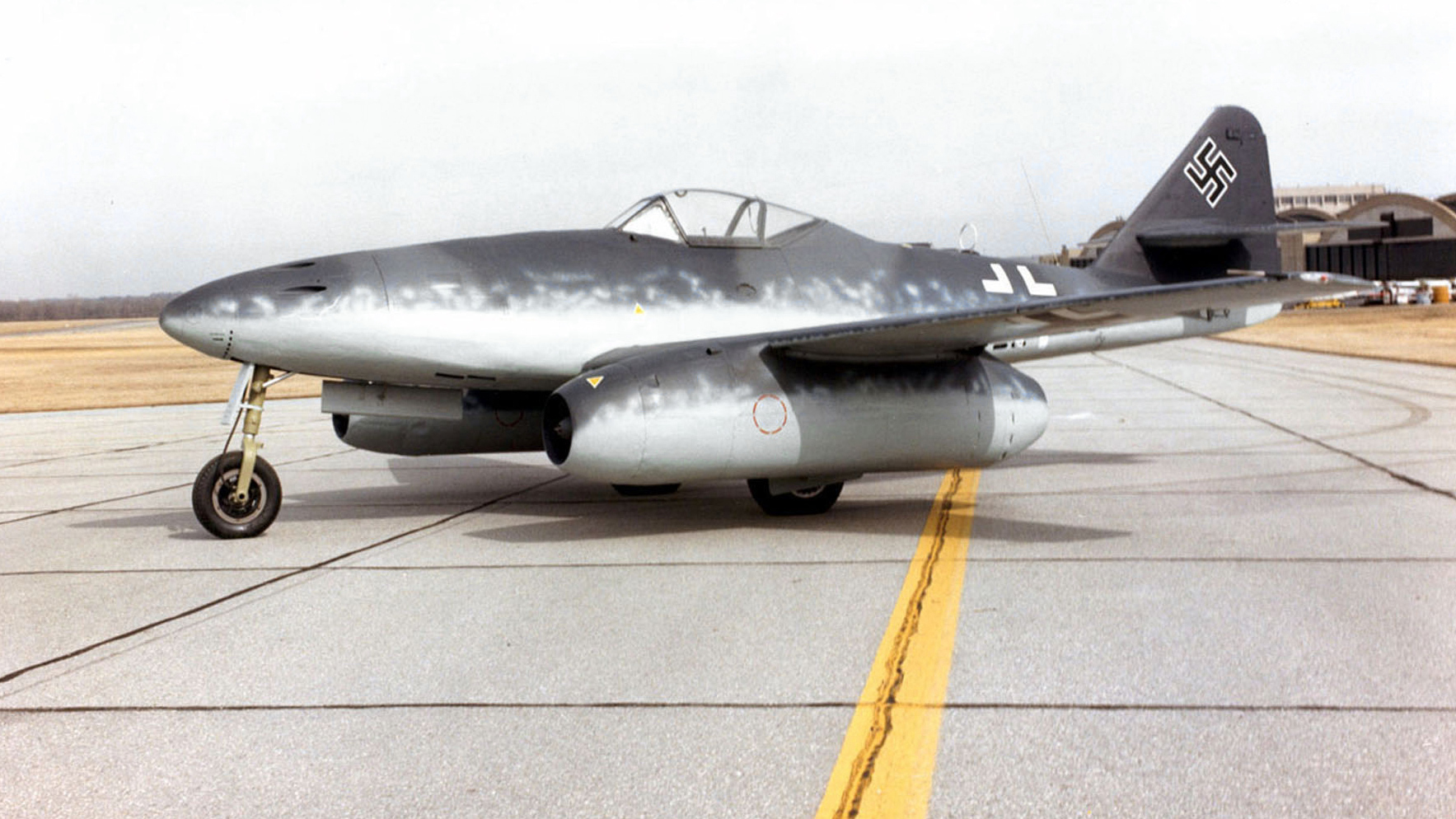
Me 262 similar to those flown by Lützow.

In early April 1945, Lützow joined Galland's Jagdverband 44 (JV 44—44th Fighter Detachment) at Munich-Riem. JV 44 was equipped with the Messerschmitt Me 262 jet fighter, an aircraft which was heavily armed and faster than any Allied fighter. Galland hoped that the Me 262 would compensate for the numerical superiority of the Allies. Lützow had been released from his position as fighter leader in Italy and Galland appointed him as his adjutant. Lützow was credited with two aerial victories flying the Me 262.

Lützow was posted missing in action following combat on 24 April 1945 while attempting to intercept an attack by United States Army Air Forces (USAAF) Martin B-26 Marauder medium bombers near Donauwörth. According to Stockert, an examination of U.S. records by Mr. Hirst indicates that Lützow's Me 262 crashed near Schrobenhausen. The USAAF flew three attacks against the oil terminals at Schrobenhausen, south of Neuburg an der Donau, that day. On their second mission, 22 B-26 bombers escorted by 16 Republic P-47 Thunderbolt fighter aircraft, were just beginning their bomb run at 3:25 pm, when they came under attack by four Me 262s. Two P-47s came diving down from their top cover position to fend off the attacking jets. In this account, one Me 262 pilot noticed that he was about to come under attack and attempted to dive away. The Me 262 was unable to recover from the dive, and the American pilots observed it crashing into a small hill. This Me 262 may have been piloted by Lützow.

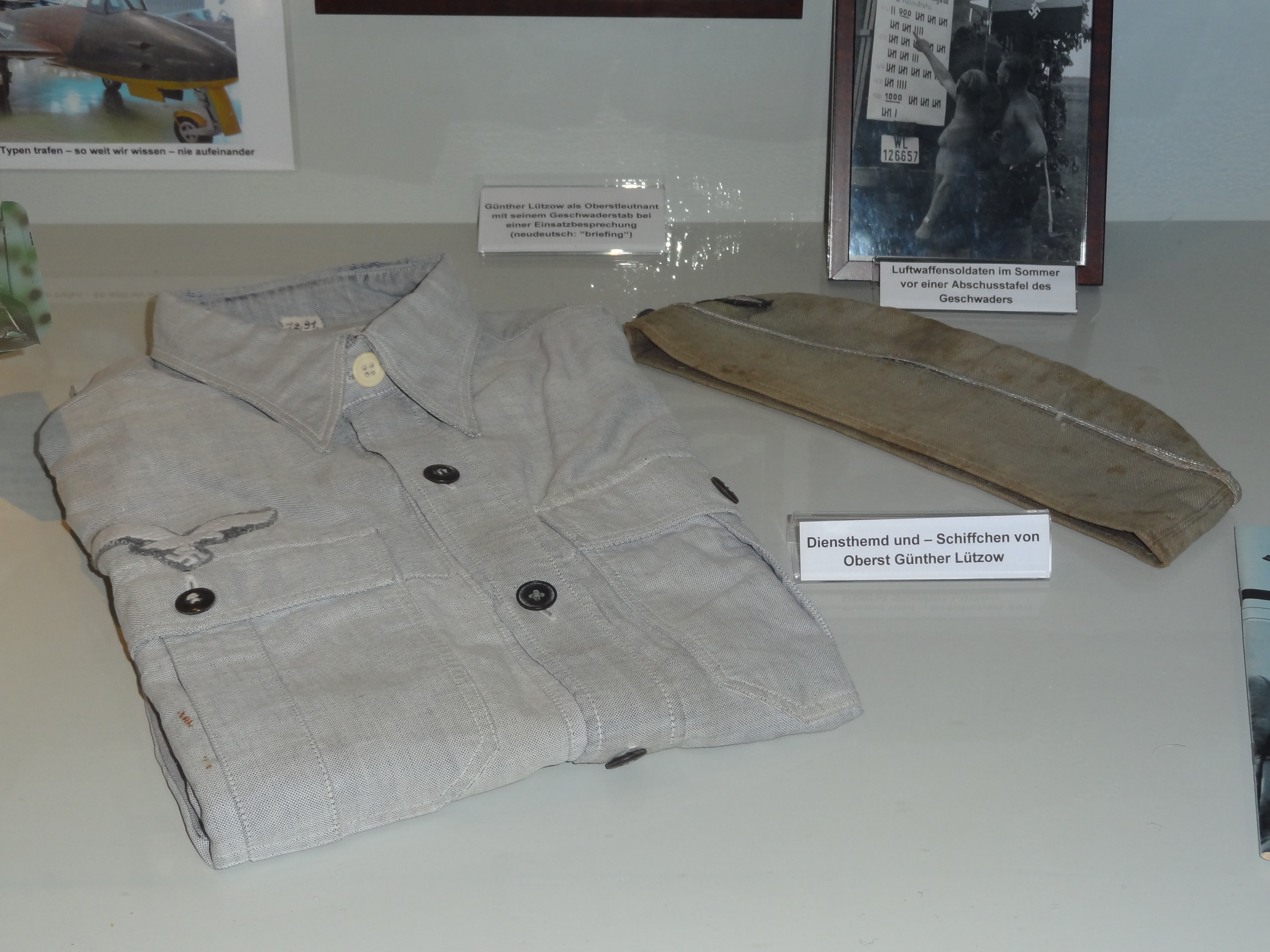
His shirt and side cap on display at the Aviation Museum Hannover-Laatzen

That day, Lützow had led a flight of six Me 262s of JV 44 against a force of 256 medium bombers of the 322nd and 344th Bombardment Group (344th BG). Lützow's flight included Hauptmann Walter Krupinski and Oberleutnant Klaus Neumann. Two of the Me 262s had to abort the mission due to engine problems. The remaining four, of which at least Lützow's and Neumann's Me 262s were armed with the R4M unguided air-to-air rockets, attacked elements of 344th BG. Following the first attack, at least three B-26 Marauder bombers were seen trailing smoke, when the Me 262s came under attack by P-47 Thunderbolt fighter aircraft of the 365th Fighter Group. Blue Flight leader Captain Jerry G. Mast and his wingman, Second Lieutenant Byron Smith, went into full power dives to drive the attacking Me 262s away. Following the dive, Smith got separated from Mast and pursued an Me 262. Mast and Second Lieutenant William H. Myers then jointly went after another Me 262 which went into an even steeper dive. The Me 262 was seen crashing into the ground and exploding. In Forsyth's account, the Me 262 chased by Mast and Myers was Lützow's and had been flying furthest to the south.

Krupinski observed all four jets break away from the American formation. He observed one B-26 trailing black smoke but the presence of a strong American fighter escort precluded another attack-run. The German pilots decided to head for the airbase. All four began a wide turn to set course for home. Lützow was at the southernmost end of the loose formation. He recalled:

We broke away in a wide left-turn on our homeward route. Oberst Lützow's change in course towards a southerly direction was completely incomprehensible to me and I therefore called him on the radio but did not get a reply. The explosion I saw, or something very similar, occurred at a distance of 20 kilometers (12 miles). Everyone knows, that at that distance, details can no longer be observed.

On 28 April 2015, the Augsburger Allgemeine, a German regional daily newspaper, published an article stating that according to Erich Bäcker, Lützow attempted an emergency landing at Donaumünster/Erlingshofen and crashed into the Danube. Bäcker made his claim based on reports made by eye-witnesses who saw a low flying Me 262 crashing into the Danube that day.

== Summary of career ==
=== Aerial victory credits ===
According to US historian David T. Zabecki, Lützow was credited with 110 aerial victories. He claimed these 110 aerial victories in 310 combat missions, five of which were victories in Spain, and 105 during World War II. The majority of his World War II victories were claimed over the Eastern Front, although 20 were claimed over the Western Front, two of which were achieved while flying the Me 262 jet fighter. These included one four-engined bomber. Spick lists him with 108 aerial victories claimed in approximately 300 combat missions, and a mission-to-claim ratio of 2.78.

Chronicle of aerial victories
This and the ♠ (Ace of spades) indicates those aerial victories which made Lützow an "ace-in-a-day", a term which designates a fighter pilot who has shot down five or more airplanes in a single day. This and the ? (question mark) indicates conflicting information regarding the date or type of the aerial victory.
Claim	Date	Time	Location	Type	Claim	Date	Time	Location	Type
Spanish Civil War
– 2. Staffel of Jagdgruppe 88 –
1	6 April 1937	—	Ochandiano	I-15	4	18 August 1937	—	Santander	I-15
2	22 May 1937	—	Bilbao	I-15	5	22 August 1937	—	Las Arenas	I-16
3	28 May 1937	—	Santander	I-15					
World War II
– I. Gruppe of Jagdgeschwader 3 –
6	14 May 1940	ca. 20:20	northwest of Dinant	Curtiss	11	31 May 1940? (Note: According to Prien and Stemmer aerial victories 10 and 11 on 31 May 1940. According to Braatz on 29 May 1940, who refers to Lützow's log-book. Prien and Stemmer point out that the Lützow's log-book is incorrect.)	19:35	south of Amiens	M.S. 406
7	14 May 1940	ca. 20:20	northwest of Dinant	Curtiss	12	3 June 1940	13:50–15:35	Compiègne-Meaux	Curtiss
8	15 May 1940	13:20	southeast of Charleroi	Curtiss	13	6 June 1940? (Note: According to Prien and Stemmer aerial victory 13 on 6 June 1940. According to Braatz on 8 June 1940.)	13:05	Saint-Valery-Abbeville	Blenheim
9	19 May 1940	19:15	north of Arras	Hurricane	14	8 June 1940? (Note: According to Prien and Stemmer aerial victory 14 on 8 June 1940. According to Braatz on 10 June 1940.)	08:25–09:45	Abbeville	Blenheim
10	31 May 1940?	19:35	south of Amiens	M.S. 406	15	16 August 1940	12:20–14:00	—	Spitfire
– Stab of Jagdgeschwader 3 –
16	26 August 1940	12:35–13:45	—	Defiant	63	6 September 1941	17:10–18:30	—	R-10
17	26 August 1940	12:35–13:45	—	Defiant	64	7 September 1941	10:50–12:20	—	SB-2
18	7 September 1940	17:10–18:45	—	Hurricane	65	7 September 1941	10:50–12:20	—	SB-2
19	9 September 1940	17:45–19:05	—	Hurricane	66	7 September 1941	16:25–18:00	—	I-153
20	15 September 1940	12:00–13:05	—	Hurricane	67	7 September 1941	16:25–18:00	—	I-153
21	5 October 1940	12:00–13:05	—	Curtiss	68	8 September 1941	11:20–12:40	—	R-10
22	5 October 1940	14:15–15:30	—	Curtiss	69	9 September 1941	16:10–17:35	—	I-16
23	5 November 1940	10:20–11:35	—	Spitfire	70	9 September 1941	16:10–17:35	—	SB-2
24	22 June 1941	4:30	—	I-18	71	11 September 1941	16:30–18:05	—	DB-3
25	23 June 1941	06:45–08:15	—	SB-2	72	11 September 1941	16:30–18:05	—	I-61
26	23 June 1941	06:45–08:15	—	SB-2	73	12 September 1941	15:35–17:00	—	SB-2
27	24 June 1941	14:15–15:30	—	I-153	74	13 September 1941	16:35–17:30	—	DB-3
28	26 June 1941	13:20	—	SB-2	75	13 September 1941	16:35–17:30	—	DB-3
29	26 June 1941	13:15–13:45	—	SB-2	76	14 September 1941	11:20–12:50	—	I-26
30	26 June 1941	15:00–16:14	—	Pe-2	77	17 September 1941	10:45–11:45	—	PS-84
31	27 June 1941	17:15–18:20	—	DB-3	78	5 October 1941	14:45–16:00	10 km (6.2 mi) southeast of Oryol	DB-3
32	28 June 1941	16:47–18:36	—	Pe-2	79	5 October 1941	14:45–16:00	10 km (6.2 mi) southeast of Oryol	DB-3
33	7 July 1941	09:30–10:45	—	DB-3	80	5 October 1941	14:45–16:00	10 km (6.2 mi) southeast of Oryol	DB-3
34	10 July 1941	09:00–19:25	—	V-11	81	5 October 1941	14:45–16:00	10 km (6.2 mi) southeast of Oryol	DB-3
35	10 July 1941	15:25–16:50	—	I-153	82	6 October 1941	14:00–15:45	Yukhnov/Vyazma area	I-153
36	10 July 1941	15:25–16:50	—	I-153	83	6 October 1941	14:00–15:45	Yukhnov/Vyazma area	I-153
37	10 July 1941	15:25–16:50	—	I-153	84	6 October 1941	14:00–15:45	Yukhnov/Vyazma area	DB-3
38	11 July 1941	11:50–13:15	—	I-16	85	7 October 1941	11:15–12:45	15 km (9.3 mi) west of Yukhnov	DB-3
39	15 July 1941	15:30–16:45	—	I-16	86♠	8 October 1941	12:00	north of Yukhnov	Pe-2
40	15 July 1941	15:30–16:45	—	I-16	87♠	8 October 1941	12:01	north of Yukhnov	Pe-2
41	15 July 1941	15:30–16:45	—	DB-3	88♠	8 October 1941	12:02	north of Yukhnov	Pe-2
42	16 July 1941	11:15–12:30	—	SB-2	89♠	8 October 1941	14:25	north of Oryol	DB-3
43	16 July 1941	15:30–16:40	—	I-16	90♠	8 October 1941	14:28	north of Oryol	DB-3
44	16 July 1941	15:30–16:40	—	DB-3	91	9 October 1941	12:00	near Mtsensk	I-18
45	17 July 1941	15:30–16:45	—	DB-3	92	9 October 1941	15:00–16:15	northeast of Oryol	I-16
46	20 July 1941	17:25–18:45	—	V-11? (Note: According to Braatz the aircraft type is unknown.)	93	9 October 1941	15:00–16:15	northeast of Oryol	Il-2
47	20 July 1941	17:25–18:45	—	V-11?	94	9 October 1941	15:00–16:15	northeast of Oryol	Pe-2
48	29 July 1941	17:25–18:40	—	I-16	95	10 October 1941	14:10	Kaluga	I-18
49	31 July 1941	11:20–12:50	—	DB-3	96	10 October 1941	14:13	Kaluga	I-18
50	31 July 1941	11:20–12:50	—	DB-3	97	11 October 1941	11:10	Kaluga	I-61
51	31 July 1941	15:50–17:20	—	I-16	98	12 October 1941	14:30	near Mdin	Pe-2
52	7 August 1941	11:30–13:20	—	I-153	99	12 October 1941	14:35	near Maloyaroslavets	Pe-2
53	7 August 1941	11:30–13:20	—	I-153	100	14 October 1941	15:45–15:10	northeast of Mozhaysk	DB-3
54	8 August 1941	11:15–13:20	—	I-153	101	14 October 1941	15:45–15:10	northeast of Mozhaysk	I-61
55	9 August 1941	10:15–11:00	—	Pe-2	102	14 October 1941	15:45–15:10	northeast of Mozhaysk	DB-3
56	9 August 1941	14:30–16:00	—	I-16	103	23 October 1941	15:25	—	I-16
57	11 August 1941	12:10–13:10	—	R-5	104	24 October 1941	10:40	—	I-16
58	12 August 1941	12:35	—	I-153	105	24 October 1941	10:50	—	I-16
59	12 August 1941	05:40–07:10	—	DB-3	106	24 October 1941	14:23	—	I-16
60	13 August 1941	09:45–11:15	Kaniv area	I-16	107	21 May 1942	12:30	—	I-61
61	13 August 1941	09:45–11:15	Kaniv area	I-16	108	29 July 1942	10:20	—	LaGG-3
62	6 September 1941	17:10–18:30	—	R-10					
– Jagdverband 44 –
109	April 1945 (after 18 April)	—	—	Four-engined bomber	110	24 April 1945	before noon	Augsburg area	B-26

=== Awards ===
- Spanish Medalla de la Campaña
- Spanish Medalla Militar
- Spanish Cross in Gold with Swords and Diamonds (6 July 1939)
- Wound Badge in Black
- Front Flying Clasp of the Luftwaffe in Gold with Pennant "300"
- Combined Pilots-Observation Badge in Gold with Diamonds
- Iron Cross (1939)
  - 2nd Class (26 May 1940)
  - 1st Class (3 June 1940)
- Knight's Cross of the Iron Cross with Oak Leaves and Swords
  - Knight's Cross on 18 September 1940 as Major and Geschwaderkommodore of Jagdgeschwader 3
  - 27th Oak Leaves on 20 July 1941 as Major and Geschwaderkommodore of Jagdgeschwader 3
  - 4th Swords on 11 October 1941 as Major and Geschwaderkommodore of Jagdgeschwader 3

== Notes ==
Military offices
Preceded by Oberstleutnant Karl Vieck	Commander of Jagdgeschwader 3 Udet; 21 August 1940 – 11 August 1942	Succeeded by Oberst Wolf-Dietrich Wilcke
Preceded by Oberstleutnant Friedrich Beckh	Acting Commander of Jagdgeschwader 51; 16 September 1941 – 21 December 1941	Succeeded by Oberstleutnant Friedrich Beckh
Preceded by none	Commander of Jagdabschnittsführer Italien; July 1943 – September 1943	Succeeded by disbanded
Preceded by Generalleutnant Kurt-Bertram von Döring	Commander of 1. Jagd-Division; 15 September 1943 – 23 March 1944	Succeeded by Oberst Hajo Herrmann
Preceded by none	Commander of 4. Fliegerschul-Division; 1 November 1944 – 10 November 1944	Succeeded by Oberst Hannes Trautloft
