= Jagdverband 44 =

- Unit insignia
- Active: March 1945 – May 1945
- Country: Nazi Germany
- Branch: Luftwaffe
- Type: Special operations forces
- Role: Aerial reconnaissance Aerial warfare Air combat manoeuvring Airstrike; Close air support Special operations Tactical bombing
- Garrison/HQ: Ainring
- Engagements: Defense of the Reich

Commanders
- Notable commanders: Adolf Galland; Heinz Bär

Aircraft flown
- Fighter: Me 262, Fw 190D

Jagdverband 44 (JV 44) was a German Luftwaffe special operations unit during World War II. It was formed during the last months of World War II to operate the Messerschmitt Me 262 jet fighter.

== History ==
The commander of JV 44 was General Adolf Galland, the former General der Jagdflieger (General of Fighter pilots) who had recently been sacked from his staff post by Hermann Göring for criticizing the operational policies, strategic doctrine, and tactics mandated by the Luftwaffe High Command in the "Fighter Pilots' Revolt". Galland was charged with setting up a small Me 262 unit to demonstrate the capabilities of the jet fighter, as Göring taunted him to "prove what you've always said about the 262's great potential." Additionally, Göring saw this as a way of possibly disposing of Galland and fellow members of the Fighter Pilot's Revolt, rather than forcing their suicides, which had been overruled by Hitler.

JV 44 comprised a core of experienced pilots (Experten) chosen from Galland's former staff or recruited from units which had been disbanded or were being re-equipped. JV 44 performed well during its brief history, achieving a 4-to-1 kill ratio. However, it had relatively few operational jet planes available for any single sortie and was repeatedly forced to relocate due to the approach of Allied ground forces. Its complement included 50 pilots and 25 airplanes.

Galland was injured on 26 April after attacking B-26 bombers, and Heinrich Bär assumed command of the unit. As the German surrender approached, Galland disbanded the unit, releasing any pilots willing to leave, and led the rest to the American occupation zone. This "whole-unit" defection was a major part of Operation LUSTY, as the Americans gained a wealth of knowledge about jet technology (similar to Operation Paperclip).

Many JV-44 pilots went on to fly for the Bundesluftwaffe post-war, and formed the backbone of the establishment of the Bundeswehr.

== Notable pilots ==
JV-44 was renowned among the late-war Luftwaffe for being a "Squadron of Experts," as many aces transferred to the unit in the final months of the war. A (false) rumor was even started to the effect that having the Knight's Cross was a prerequisite to joining the unit. Some of the most notable pilots were:

- Adolf Galland, unit commander, former General of Fighter Pilots, holder of the Knight's Cross with Oak Leaves, Swords, and Diamonds, and 104-victory ace
- Heinrich Bär, second-in-command, holder of the Knight's Cross with Oak Leaves, Swords, and Diamonds, and 208-victory ace
- Johannes Steinhoff, operations officer, holder of the Knight's Cross with Oak Leaves and Swords, Bundesluftwaffe general, and 176-victory ace
- Gerhard Barkhorn, holder of the Knight's Cross with Oak Leaves and Swords, and second-highest-scoring ace of all time with 301 victories
- Walter Krupinski, holder of the Knight's Cross with Oak Leaves and Swords, one of the Luftwaffe's most colorful figures, and 197-victory ace
- Günther Lützow, Galland's adjutant, holder of the Knight's Cross with Oak Leaves and Swords, and 110-victory ace
- Erich Hohagen, unit technical officer, Bundesluftwaffe general, holder of the Knight's Cross, and 56-victory ace
- Klaus Neumann, Bundesluftwaffe officer and among the first German pilots to fly the Lockheed F-104 Starfighter, holder of the Knight's Cross, and 37-victory ace
- Franz Stigler, unit technical officer and protagonist of the Brown-Stigler Incident; 28-victory ace.
