= Jagdgeschwader 20 =

20th Fighter Wing
- Jagdgeschwader 20
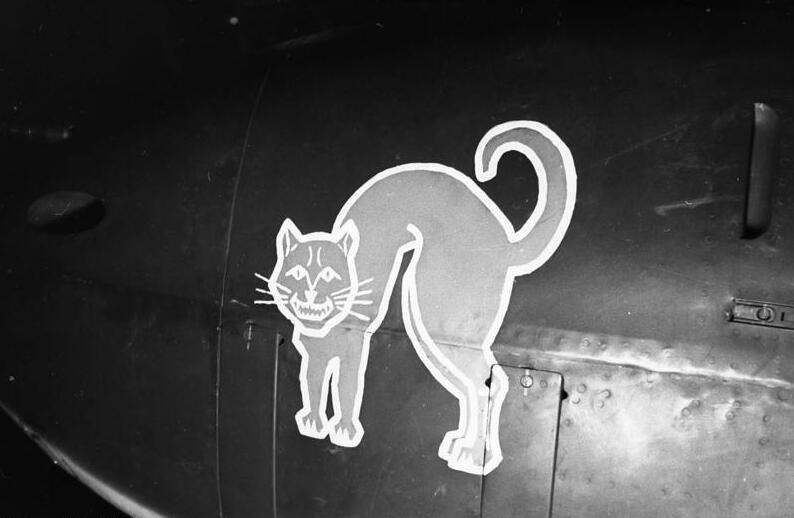
- Active: 1939–1940
- Country: Nazi Germany
- Branch: Luftwaffe
- Garrison/HQ: Jesau

Jagdgeschwader 20 (JG 20) was a Luftwaffe fighter wing during the early phase of World War II in Europe. JG 20 was founded on 15 July 1939 in Döberitz, composed of one Gruppe and two Staffeln using personnel and equipment from I./Jagdgeschwader 2. A third Staffel was added on 5 November 1939 in Brandenburg-Briest. The sole Gruppe was redesignated as 3rd Gruppe of Jagdgeschwader 51 (III./JG 51) on 4 July 1940. During the Battle of France it was subordinated to Luftflotte 2. The unit's commanders included Hauptmann Hannes Trautloft, from 19 September 1939 to 4 July 1940.

== Bibliography ==
- Mombeek, Eric; Smith, J. Richard & Creek, Eddie J. (1999). Jagdwaffe: Blitzkrieg and Sitzkrieg: Poland and France 1939–1940. Luftwaffe Colours. Vol. 1, Section 3. Classic Publications. ISBN 0-95-268677-5.
- Roba, Jean-Louis (July–August 2020). "Le I./Jagdgeschwader 20" [The First Group/Fighter Wing 20]. Avions (in French) (235): 36–53. ISSN 1243-8650.
- Tessin, Georg (1980). Verbände und Truppen der deutschen Wehrmacht und Waffen-SS im Zweiten Weltkrieg 1939–1945. Vol. 14: Die Landstreitkräfte: Namensverbände / Die Luftstreitkräfte: (Fliegende Verbände) / Flakeinsatz im Reich 1943–1945. Osnabrück: Biblio. ISBN 3764811110.
