= Kurt von Priesdorff =

Prussian officer

- Born: 19 October 1881; Berlin, German Empire
- Died: 5 September 1967 (aged 85); Naumburg, West Germany
- Relatives: Günther Lützow (son-in-law)
- Military career
- Allegiance: German Empire
- Service years: 1900–1921
- Rank: Major

Wilhelm Werner Kurt von Priesdorff (19 October 1881 in Berlin – 5 September 1967 in Naumburg) was a Prussian officer, his last rank was Major, as well as a Geheimer Regierungsrat (executive council), military historian and author.

== Awards ==
- Prussian Order of the Crown 4th Class
- Order of Saint John (Bailiwick of Brandenburg)
- Knight 2nd Class of the Order of Albert the Bear
- Order of Henry the Lion 4th Class
