= Rybokarty =

- Village
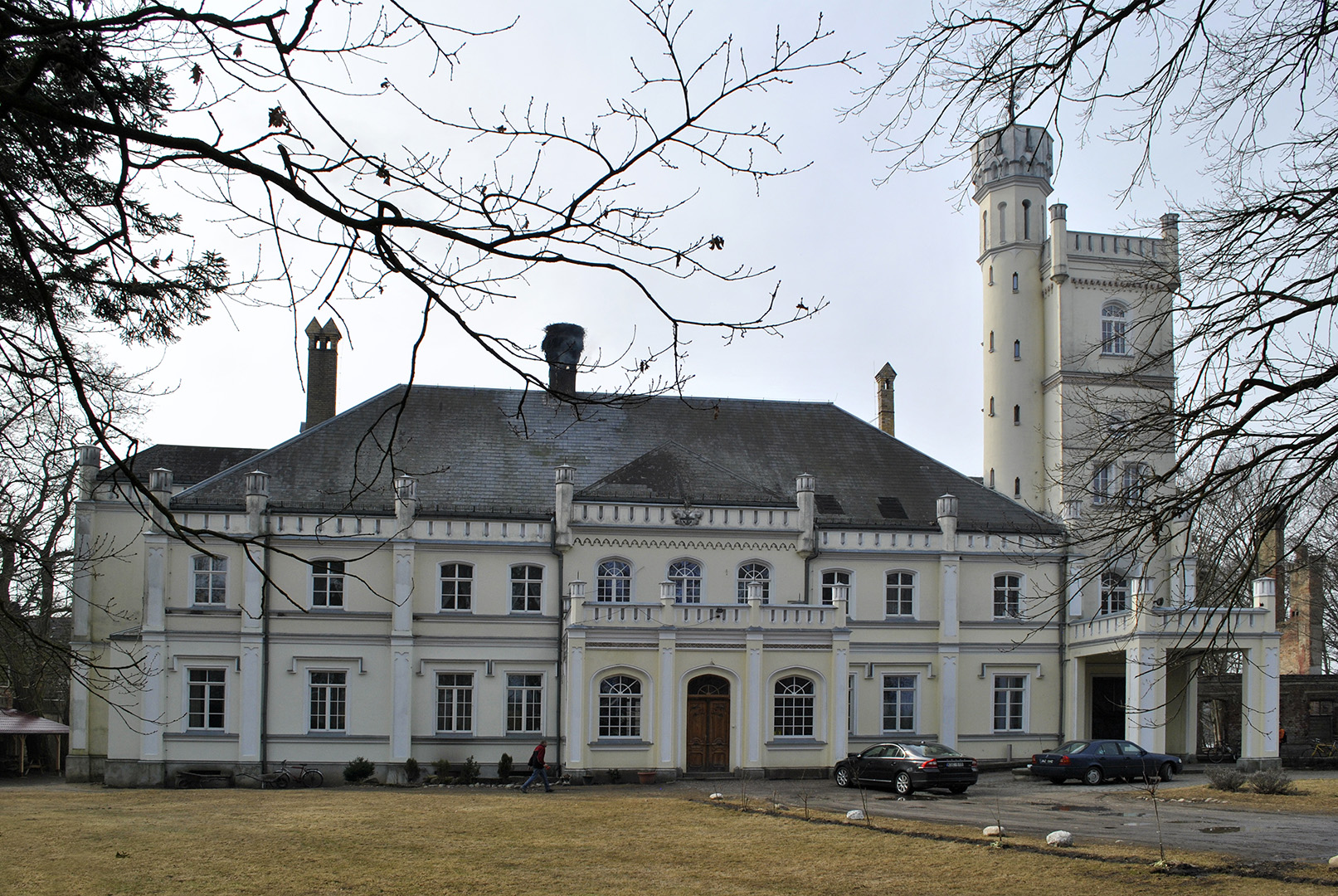
- Rybokarty Palace

- Location within Poland
- Coordinates: 53°54′47″N 15°4′52″E
- Country: Poland
- Voivodeship: West Pomeranian
- County: Gryfice
- Gmina: Gryfice

Population
  - Total: 158
- Vehicle registration: ZGY

Rybokarty [rɨbɔˈkartɨ] is a village in the administrative district of Gmina Gryfice, within Gryfice County, West Pomeranian Voivodeship, in north-western Poland. It lies approximately 8 km (5 mi) west of Gryfice and 65 km (40 mi) north-east of the regional capital Szczecin.

The village has a population of 158.

The mansion, built in the 16th century, is used nowadays as a guest house called "Pałac Ptaszynka" (means "Palace Little Bird" in Polish).

== History ==
The territory became part of the Duchy of Poland under its first ruler Mieszko I around 967. Following the fragmentation of Poland, the area became part of the Duchy of Pomerania, which was soon incorporated into the Holy Roman Empire and its successor German states. From the 18th century, it was included within the Kingdom of Prussia, and following the unification of Germany in 1871, it remained under German rule—first as part of the German Empire and later under Nazi Germany—until 1945, when the village was restored back to Poland.

== Notable residents ==
- Kurt-Bertram von Döring (1889–1960), Luftwaffe General
