= Klaus Neumann (officer) =

German fighter ace and Knight's Cross recipient

- Neumann during World War II
- Born: 5 October 1923; Wettin, Province of Saxony
- Died: 10 December 2000 (aged 77); Altenkirchen, Rhineland-Palatinate
- Military career
- Allegiance: Nazi Germany; West Germany
- Branch: Luftwaffe; German Air Force
- Service years: 1942–1945; 1956–1974
- Rank: Leutnant (second lieutenant); Oberst (colonel)
- Units: JG 51, JG 3, JG 7 and JV 44
- Conflicts: World War II Eastern Front Defense of the Reich
- Awards: Knight's Cross of the Iron Cross

Klaus Neumann (5 October 1923 – 10 December 2000) was a Leutnant in the Luftwaffe and recipient of the Knight's Cross of the Iron Cross during World War II. The Knight's Cross of the Iron Cross, and its variants were the highest awards in the military and paramilitary forces of Nazi Germany during World War II. As a fighter pilot he was credited with 37 aerial victories—that is, 37 aerial combat encounters resulting in the destruction of the enemy aircraft—achieved in about 200 combat missions.

== Career ==
Neuman was born on 5 October 1923 in Wettin in the Province of Saxony within the Weimar Republic. Following flight and fighter pilot training, (Note: Flight training in the Luftwaffe progressed through the levels A1, A2 and B1, B2, referred to as A/B flight training. A training included theoretical and practical training in aerobatics, navigation, long-distance flights and dead-stick landings. The B courses included high-altitude flights, instrument flights, night landings and training to handle the aircraft in difficult situations.) Neumann was posted to 2. Staffel (2nd squadron) Jagdgeschwader 51 (JG 51—51st Fighter Wing) which was based on the Eastern Front in early 1943. According to Obermaier, he claimed his first victory on 15 July 1943 and was credited with 12 aerial victories while flying on the Eastern Front.

=== Defense of the Reich ===
On 25 May 1944, 2. Staffel of JG 51 under command Oberleutnant Horst Haase was transferred from Orsha on the Eastern Front to Germany. The Staffel augmented IV. Gruppe of Jagdgeschwader 3 "Udet" (JG 3—3rd Fighter Wing) based at Salzwedel. The Gruppe had been converted to a Sturmgruppe (assault group), the first of such units, as a means to combat the heavy bomber formations of the United States Army Air Forces (USAAF). To combat the USAAF heavy bomber formations flying in a combat box, the Staffel received and trained on the heavily armored and less maneuverable variant of the Focke-Wulf Fw 190 A-8/R2 series, also known as "Sturmböcke". With the exception of 2. Staffel which continued its training on the Fw 190, IV. Gruppe had been briefly deployed to France where it fought in the Invasion of Normandy. On 21 June, the Gruppe, including 2. Staffel, relocated to Ansbach Airfield where it came under control of 7. Jagddivision (7th Fighter Division) under command of Generalmajor Joachim-Friedrich Huth. Operationally, IV. Gruppe was subordinated to the Geschwaderstab (headquarters unit) of Jagdgeschwader 300 (JG 300—300th Fighter Wing) led by Major Walther Dahl.

Combat box of a 12-plane B-17 squadron. Three such boxes completed a 36-plane group box.: 1. Lead Element; 2. High Element; 3. Low Element; 4. Low Low Element

On 6 July, IV. Gruppe relocated to Illesheim Airfield located 18 kilometers (11 miles) northeast of Rothenburg ob der Tauber. The following day, a force of 1,129 B-17 Flying Fortresses and B-24 Liberators of the USAAF Eighth Air Force set out from England to bomb aircraft factories in the Leipzig area and the synthetic oil plants at Boehlen, Leuna-Merseburg and Lützkendorf. This formation was intercepted by a German Gefechtsverband (combat formation) consisting of IV. Sturmgruppe of JG 3, led by Hauptmann Wilhelm Moritz, escorted by two Gruppen of Messerschmitt Bf 109s from JG 300 led by Dahl. Dahl and Moritz drove the attack to point-blank range behind the Liberators of the 492d Bombardment Group before opening fire. 492d Bombardment Group was temporarily without fighter cover. Within about a minute the entire squadron of twelve B-24s had been annihilated. The Germans claimed 28 USAAF 2nd Air Division B-24s that day and were credited with at least 21. The majority to the Sturmgruppe attack. In this encounter, also known as the Luftschlacht bei Oschersleben (aerial battle at Oschersleben), Neumann claimed an Herausschuss (separation shot)—a severely damaged heavy bomber forced to separate from his combat box which was counted as an aerial victory—over a B-24 bomber at 09:42, his 13th in total.

On 20 July, the USAAF sent 1,172 heavy bombers of the Eighth Air Force against railroad infrastructure, airfields and ball bearing factories in central Germany. Simultaneously approximately 400 heavy bombers of the Fifteenth Air Force attacked aircraft manufacturing in Friedrichshafen and the Memmingen Airfield. IV. Gruppe was scrambled at 09:45. After it joined up with JG 300, the fighters were vectored to a point of intercept with bombers of the 1st Bombardment Division. At 11:00 in the area west of Leipzig, Moritz led an attack on bombers of 91st Bombardment Group which they encountered without escorting fighter protection. In this attack, Neumann claimed two Boeing B-17 Flying Fortress bombers shot down.

On 3 August, IV. Gruppe flew its first combat mission of the month when the USAAF Fifteenth Air Force again attacked Friedrichshafen and Immenstaad am Bodensee, the of the Dornier Flugzeugwerke. The Gruppe was scrambled at 10:35 and intercepted a formation of approximately 30 B-24 bombers of the 465th Bombardment Group in the area of Sonthofen. Led by Moritz, the Sturmgruppe attacked the bombers from the rear and claimed 19 aerial victories and Herausschüsse, including a B-24 by Neumann at 11:41. Later that day at 15:51, Neumann claimed a B-17 of the 1st Bombardment Division attacking railroad infrastructure and fuel factories southwest Germany. On 10 August, 2. Staffel of JG 51 was formally integrated into IV. Gruppe of JG 3 and became the 16. Sturmstaffel of JG 3 (16. Sturm/JG 3). Five days later, the Eighth Air Force sent 219 B-17 bombers of the 1st Bombardment Division to bomb the Luftwaffe airfields at Wiesbaden-Erbenheim, Frankfurt-Eschborn and Köln-Ostheim. Scrambled at 10:00, IV. Gruppe joined up with JG 300 and headed for Frankfurt. The Luftwaffe fighters encountered B-17 bombers north of Trier with IV. Gruppe attacking the bombers from the rear. In this aerial battle, IV. Gruppe pilots claimed ten aerial victories and Herausschüsse, including one B-17 bomber by Neumann.

On 2 November, JG 3 defended against another attack flown by the Eighth Air Force when 1,174 heavy bombers, escorted by 968 escort fighters, attacked traffic infrastructure and fuel production in western and central Germany. Luftwaffe defenses responded with 490 fighters from I. Jagdkorps (1st Fighter Corps), predominately elements from JG 3, Jagdgeschwader 4 (JG 4—4th Fighter Wing) and Jagdgeschwader 27 (JG 27—27th Fighter Wing) of which 305 had enemy contact. IV. Gruppe of JG 3 was scrambled at 11:35 and joined up with the Geschwaderstab, I. Gruppe and II. Gruppe to intercept the bombers of the 1st and 3rd Bombardment Division heading for the synthetic fuel fuel factories at Merseburg and Leuna. Shortly before noon, JG 3 intercepted a large heavy bomber formation, along with their escorting fighters, in the area of Halle, Dessau, northwest of Leipzig. In this encounter, JG 3 lost 49 aircraft shot, including 26 pilots killed in action with further eleven pilots wounded in combat, for 25 aerial victories claimed. The IV. Gruppe claimed 21 of the 25 aerial victories, with Neuman accounting for two B-17 bombers shot down, taking his total to 32. During this battle, Neumann was one of the Luftwaffe pilots shot down and wounded by the escorting fighters. Forced to bail out, his Fw 190 A-8/R2 (Werknummer 682200—factory number) crashed near Halle and Wettin. For this, Neumann was awarded the Knight's Cross of the Iron Cross (Ritterkreuz des Eisernen Kreuzes) on 9 December 1944 for 32 aerial victories claimed.

=== Flying the Messerschmitt Me 262 ===
In January 1945, Neumann transferred to Jagdgeschwader 7 "Nowotny" (JG 7—7th Fighter Wing) "Nowotny", the first operational jet fighter wing in the world which was named after Walter Nowotny, who was killed in action on 8 November 1944, in a staff position. Here he clashed with the unit's recently appointed Geschwaderkommodore, Major Theodor Weissenberger, over personal issues. Shortly afterwards Oberst Johannes Steinhoff and Generalleutnant Adolf Galland approached him with an invitation to join Jagdverband 44 (JV 44—44th Fighter Detachment). On 31 March, JV 44 relocated from Brandenburg-Briest to Munich-Riem. The first group of Messerschmitt Me 262 jet fighters was led by Steinhoff. Shortly after 16:00, communications equipment was flown to Munich-Riem in a Siebel Si 204 transport aircraft. Neumann later led a second group of Me 262s to Munich-Riem.

On 5 April, JV 44 flew its first full combat mission. Five Me 262 fighters took off from Munich-Riem for an intercept mission of USAAF heavy bombers. On tis mission, Neumann claimed his first aerial victories flying the Me 262. US records show that the 379th Bombardment Group lost three bombers, and the 388th and 453rd Bombardment Group lost one bomber each to Me 262 jet fighters that day. JV 44 pilots claimed five aerial victories that day, one by Oberst Günther Lützow, another by Steinhoff and three by Neumann. (Note: For a list of Luftwaffe jet aces see List of German World War II jet aces)

At 3:00 PM on 24 April 1945 Neumann was one of four pilots to take off from Munich-Riem airport to intercept Martin B-26 Marauder. Lützow, who failed to return from this mission, led the flight of four. Lützow's fate remains unknown to this date. On 4 May, JV 44 surrendered to U.S. forces, the pilots taken prisoner of war. Neumann, accompanied by Heinz Sachsenberg, Bodo Dischauer, Karl-Heinz Hofmann and Waldemar Wübke, took off with whatever means they found.

== Later life ==
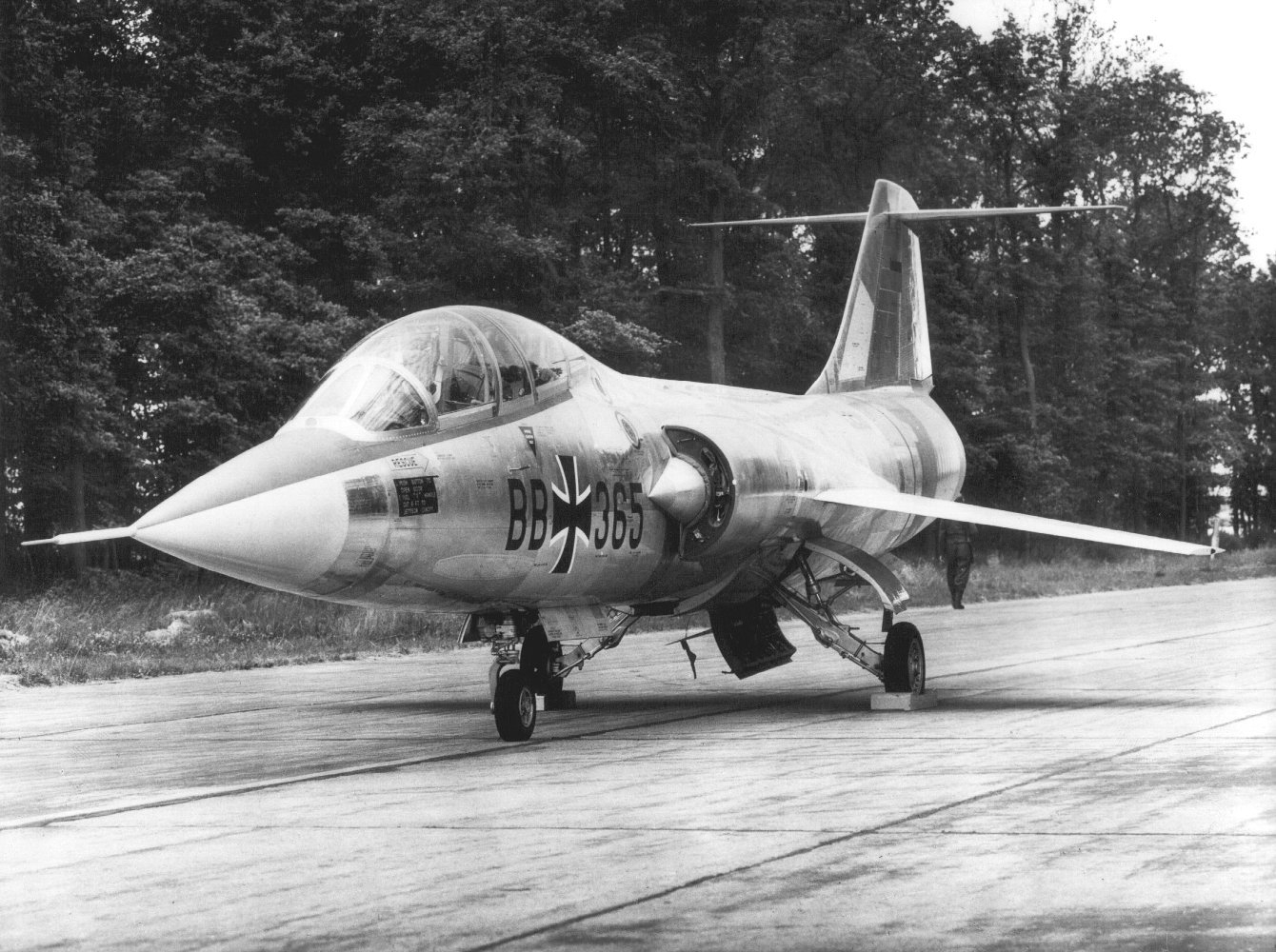
A West German F-104F in 1960.

Following World War II, Neumann reentered military service in the West German Air Force, at the time referred to as the Bundesluftwaffe. In January 1956, he belonged to a small group of pilots trained at Landsberg-Lech Air Base, first on the Piper PA-18 Super Cub, progressing to the North American T-6 Texan before completing training on the Lockheed T-33 on 24 September 1956. In September 1960, Neumann was among the first Bundesluftwaffe pilots to learn to fly the Lockheed F-104 Starfighter. Neumann retired in September 1974 holding the rank of Oberst (colonel) and died on 10 December 2000 at the age of 77 in Altenkirchen, Germany.

== Summary of career ==
=== Aerial victory claims ===
According to Obermaier, Neumann was credited with 37 aerial victories claimed in approximately 200 combat missions, twelve of which over the Eastern Front. On the Western Front, he claimed 19 four-engined heavy bombers and five enemy aircraft flying the Me 262 jet fighter. Mathews and Foreman, authors of Luftwaffe Aces — Biographies and Victory Claims, researched the German Federal Archives and found records for at least 19 aerial victory claims, plus four further unconfirmed claims, all of which over the Western Allies. This figure includes at least 17 four-engined heavy bombers and three flying the Me 262 jet fighter. The authors Morgan and Weal list him with five aerial victories flying the Me 262 jet fighter.

Victory claims were logged to a map-reference (PQ = Planquadrat), for example "PQ 15 Ost S/HC". The Luftwaffe grid map (Jägermeldenetz) covered all of Europe, western Russia and North Africa and was composed of rectangles measuring 15 minutes of latitude by 30 minutes of longitude, an area of about 360 square miles (930 km^{2}). These sectors were then subdivided into 36 smaller units to give a location area 3 km × 4 km (1.9 mi × 2.5 mi) in size.

Chronicle of aerial victories
This and the – (dash) indicates unwitnessed aerial victory claims for which Neumann did not receive credit. This along with the * (asterisk) indicates an Herausschuss (separation shot)—a severely damaged heavy bomber forced to separate from his combat box which was counted as an aerial victory. This and the ? (question mark) indicates information discrepancies listed by Prien, Stemmer, Rodeike, Bock, Mathews and Foreman.
Claim	Date	Time	Type	Location	Claim	Date	Time	Type	Location
– 2. Staffel of Jagdgeschwader 51 – Defense of the Reich — 25 May – 9 August 1944
1	7 July 1944	09:42	B-24*	PQ 15 Ost S/HC, Oschersleben	4	29 July 1944	10:26	B-24*	PQ 15 Ost S/MD-1/2, Hassenhausen; Laucha
2	20 July 1944	11:10	B-17	PQ 15 Ost S/NF vicinity of Chemnitz	5	3 August 1944	11:41	B-24	PQ 04 S/GB-4; Stanzach
3	20 July 1944	11:15? (Note: According to Mathews and Foreman claimed at 11:12.)	B-17	PQ 15 Ost S/NF	6	3 August 1944	15:51	B-17	PQ 04 Ost S/AP-7/9 south of Sarreguemines
– 16. Sturmstaffel of Jagdgeschwader 3 "Udet" – Defense of the Reich — 10 August – 31 December 1944
7	15 August 1944	11:50	B-17	PQ 05 Ost S/QO-6/1; Daun-Kyllburg	14	12 September 1944	11:40	B-17	PQ 15 Ost S/DG-EG-DH-EH north of Berlin
8	16 August 1944	10:02	B-17	PQ 05 Ost S/LU southwest of Kassel	15	27 September 1944	11:08	B-24	PQ 15 Ost S/MA-NA/05 Ost S/MU-NU; Eisenach
9	22 August 1944	10:12	B-24	PQ 15 Ost S/HP-7/8; Nagykanizsa	16	27 September 1944	11:08	B-24	PQ 15 Ost S/MA-NA/05 Ost S/MU-NU; Eisenach
10	23 August 1944	12:17	B-24	PQ 15 Ost S/EL-5/8; Mariazell	17	28 September 1944	12:50	B-17	PQ 15 Ost S/JB west of Halberstadt
11	28 August 1944	11:50	P-51	PQ 15 Ost S/69658	18	7 October 1944	12:08	B-17	northeast of Weimar
12	29 August 1944	10:46	B-17	PQ 15 Ost S/UQ-7/UR-8; Brünn	19? (Note: According to Mathews and Foreman claimed this claim is unconfirmed.)	2 November 1944	12:47	B-17	PQ 15 Ost KD
13	11 September 1944	12:04	B-17	PQ 15 Ost S/KD-LD north of Halle	20?	2 November 1944	12:47	B-17	PQ 15 Ost KD
– Jagdverband 44 – Defense of the Reich — April 1945
? (Note: This claim is not list by Mathews and Foreman.)	5 April 1945	—	B-17			7 April 1945	—	P-51	
?	5 April 1945	—	B-17		—	26 April 1945	—	B-26	vicinity of Neuburg
?	5 April 1945	—	B-17		—	26 April 1945	—	B-26	vicinity of Neuburg

=== Awards ===
- Iron Cross (1939) 2nd and 1st Class
- German Cross in Gold on 25 October 1944 as Leutnant in the 16/Jagdgeschwader 3
- Knight's Cross of the Iron Cross on 9 December 1944 as Feldwebel and pilot in the 16./Jagdgeschwader 3 "Udet" (Note: According to Scherzer on 25 November 1944 as pilot in the 16.(Sturm)/Jagdgeschwader 3 "Udet".)
