= Medalla de la Campaña =

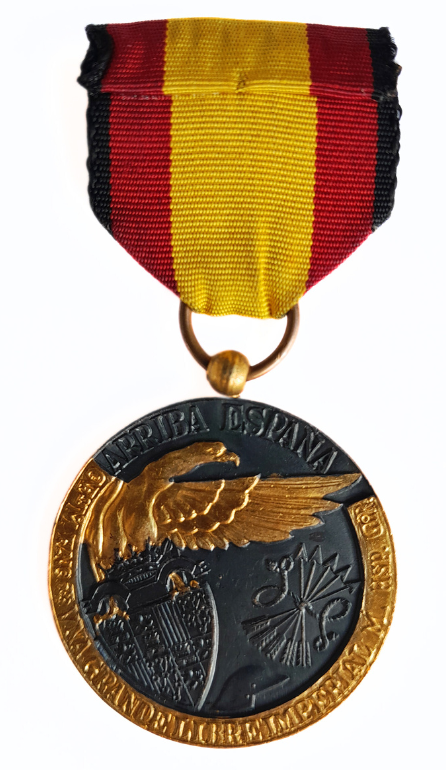
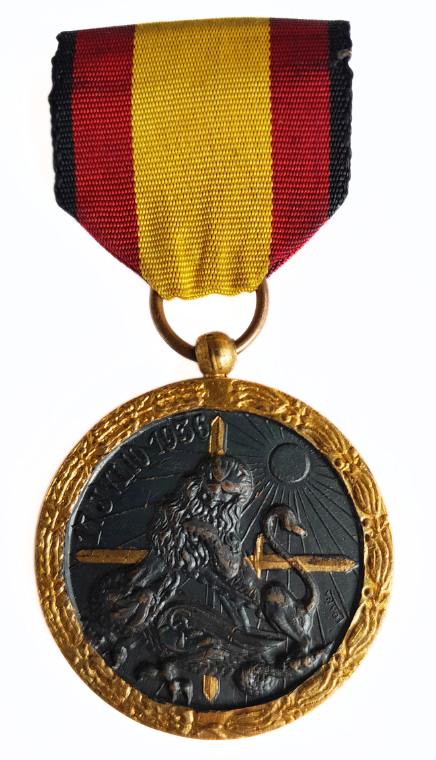
- Obverse and reverse of the medal
- Type: Medal
- Presented by: Spain
- Eligibility: Military personnel
- Status: Obsolete
- Established: 26 January 1937
- ribbon bars Front Line Service (with swords) / Rearguard

The Medal for the Campaign (Spanish: Medalla de la Campaña) was a Spanish military decoration of 1936 to 1939. The medal was established in 1937 and awarded to those who fought on the Nationalist side during the Spanish Civil War. It was awarded to military personnel of any rank who actively intervened in operations or served in the line of fire.

== Notable recipients ==
=== Spanish Civil War ===
- Günther Lützow (Condor Legion)
- Wolfram von Richthofen (Condor Legion)
- Ricardo Serrador Santés
