= Kurt-Bertram von Döring =

German flying ace (1889–1960)

- Born: 18 February 1889; Ribbekardt, Pomerania, Kingdom of Prussia, German Empire
- Died: 9 July 1960 (aged 71); Medingen, Lower Saxony, West Germany
- Military career
- Allegiance: German Empire; Weimar Republic; Nazi Germany
- Branch: Luftstreitkräfte; Luftwaffe
- Service years: 1907–1920; 1934–1945; 1923-1927; 1927–1929
- Rank: Generalleutnant; Instructor; Lieutenant Colonel
- Units: Dragoon Regiment Nr. 17; Festung Flieger-Abteilung; Flieger-Abteilung 38; Sonderstaffel Nr. 2 Flieger-Abteilung (Artillerie) 227;
- Commands: Jagdstaffel 4 Jagdstaffel 66; Jagdstaffel 1 Jagdgruppe 4
- Conflicts: World War I World War II
- Awards: House Order of Hohenzollern; Iron Cross

Generalleutnant Kurt-Bertram von Döring (18 February 1889 in Ribbekardt – 9 July 1960 in Medingen) was a German World War II Generalleutnant of Luftwaffe. He began his career as a flying ace in World War I, became a flying soldier of fortune during the 1920s and early 1930s, and then joined the resurgent German air service and served through World War II.

== Early life ==
Born 18 February 1889 at Ribbekardt, Döring joined the Dragoon Regiment Nr. 17 on 14 March 1907. In mid 1913 he transferred to the Air Service, and in May 1914 joined Festung Flieger-Abteilung in Cologne.

== World War I ==
In late 1914, he was assigned to Flieger-Abteilung 38, and was commissioned on 1 February 1915. Döring then served with Sonderstaffel Nr. 2 in 1916. An able administrative Officer and leader, as well as being considered a steady and reliable pilot, meant after service with Flieger-Abteilung (Artillerie) 227 Döring took command of Jagdstaffel 4 on 8 April 1917, before he had claimed an air victory. However, he scored his first victory a few days later, on 14 April 1917; he continued to collect wins through 4 October, when he scored his eleventh and last. On 14 December 1917, he was awarded the Royal House Order of Hohenzollern to accompany his Iron Cross First Class.

Döring also gained the trust of Jagdgeschwader 1 commander Rittmeister Manfred von Richthofen, who assigned command of Jagdgeschwader 1 to Döring when Richthofen was away from the front.

Promoted to Rittmeister on 28 November 1917, Döring remained in command of Jagdstaffel 4 until 19 January 1918, after which he took over Jagdgruppe Nr. 4. In August he took over Jagdstaffel 66, and then a few days later Jagdstaffel 1.

== Between the world wars ==
He rejoined the Dragoons on 1 December 1918. He became an advisor with the Argentinian Air Force from 1923 to 1927 and the Peruvian Air Force until 1929. From 1930 to 1932, he was a member of the German aviation mission to China.

Döring rejoined the Luftwaffe on 1 July 1934, as a major. He commanded the flying School at Celle in 1936, and became a Gruppenkommandeur of JG 2. He commanded the Horst Wessel Squadron in April 1936.

== World War II and after ==
From 15 December 1939 to 1 December 1940 he was a major general commanding Jagdfliegerführer 2. From August 1941 through January 1942, he was a Jagd Division commander with the rank of lieutenant general (Generalleutnant), his seniority dating from 1 November 1941.

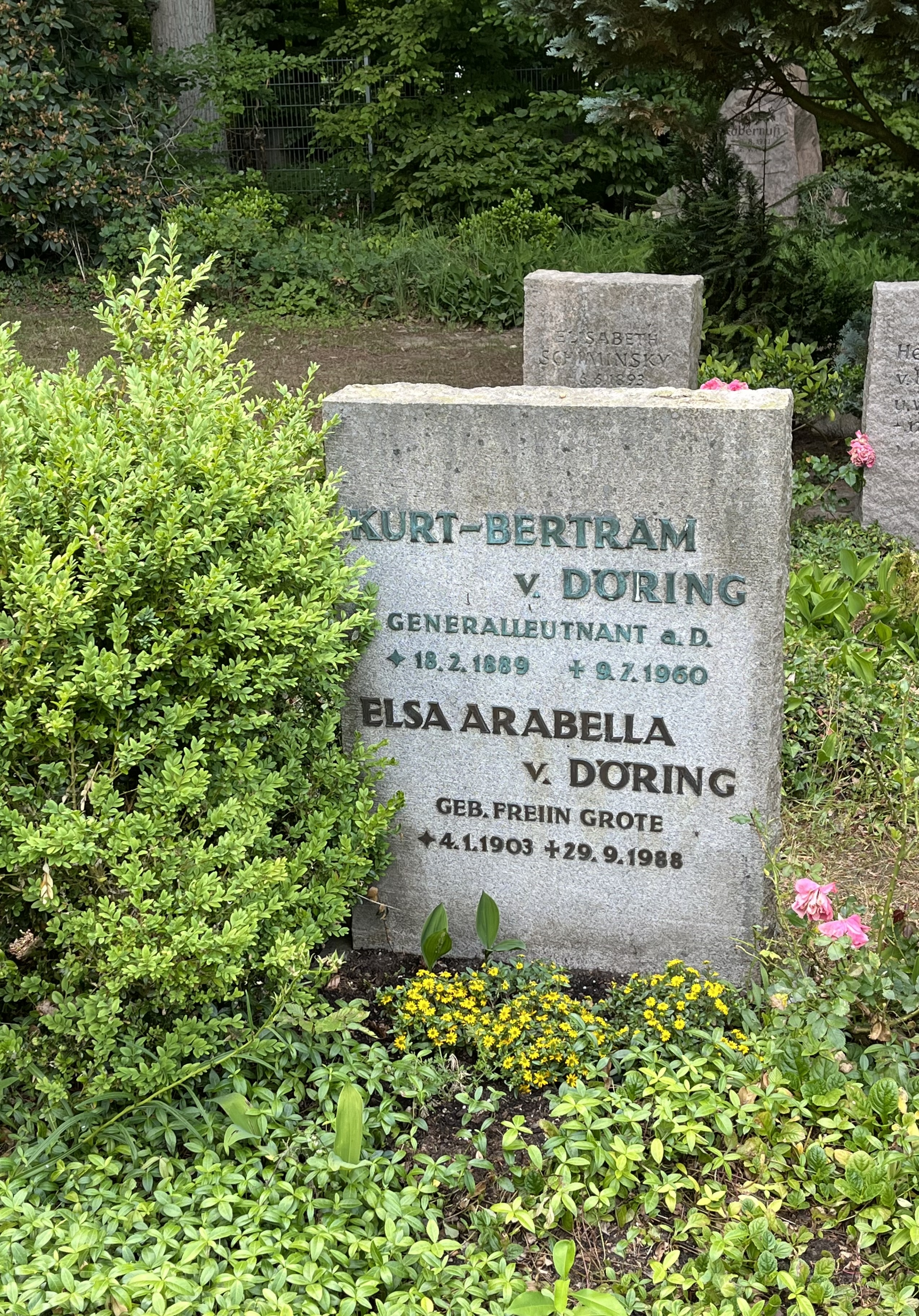
Tombstone of Kurt-Bertram von Döring in the cemetery of Medingen, administrative district of Uelzen, Lower Saxony, Germany

Döring died on 9 July 1960 at Medingen, administrative district of Uelzen, Lower-Saxony, Germany.

== Awards ==
- Iron Cross (1914) 2nd and 1st Class
- House Order of Hohenzollern (26 November 1917)
- Clasp to the Iron Cross (1939) 2nd and 1st Class
- German Cross in Gold on 30 December 1942 as Generalleutnant in the 1. Jagd-Division

Military offices
| Preceded by none | Commander of Jagdgeschwader 134 "Horst Wessel"; 1 April 1936 – 1 November 1938 | Succeeded by none |
| Preceded by none | Commander of Jagdfliegerführer 2; 21 December 1939 – 1 December 1940 | Succeeded by Generalmajor Theo Osterkamp |
| Preceded by Oberst Werner Junck | Inspekteur der Jagdflieger; 19 December 1940 – 5 August 1941 | Succeeded by Oberst Werner Mölders |
| Preceded by none | Commander of 1. Jagd-Division; 1 May 1942 – 15 September 1943 | Succeeded by Oberst Günther Lützow |
