= Jagdwaffe =

German Luftwaffe's fighter force

Jagdwaffe (German: Fighter Force), was the German Luftwaffe's fighter force during World War II.

== Aircraft ==
The Jagdwaffe used many aircraft, including the Messerschmitt Bf 109, Bf 110, Me 163, Me 262, Focke-Wulf Fw 190, Ta 152, and Heinkel He 162.
