= Inspector of Fighters =

Leading position within the High Command of the Luftwaffe of Nazi Germany

- Inspekteur der Jagdflieger
- Emblem of the Luftwaffe in silver

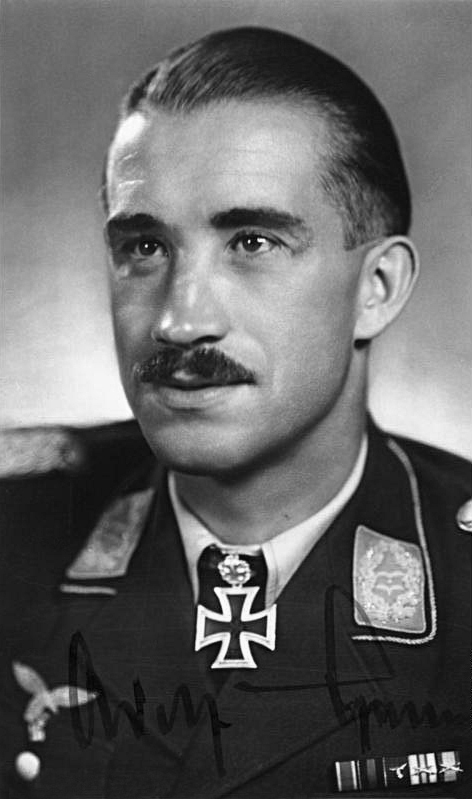
- Longest serving officeholder Generalleutnant Adolf Galland; 5 December 1941 – 31 January 1945
- Luftwaffe
- Member of: Oberkommando der Luftwaffe
- Reports to: Commander-in-Chief of the Luftwaffe
- Formation: 1 August 1935; 91 years ago
- First holder: Robert Ritter von Greim
- Final holder: Gordon Gollob
- Abolished: 8 May 1945; 81 years ago
- Deputy: See lists

Inspector of Fighters (German: Inspekteur der Jagdflieger); redesignated to General of Fighters (German: General der Jagdflieger) was not a rank but a leading position within the High Command of the Luftwaffe (Oberkommando der Luftwaffe), the air force of Nazi Germany. The inspector was responsible for the readiness, training and tactics of the fighter force. It was not an operational command.

== Inspectors ==
No.	Portrait	Inspector	Took office	Left office	Time in office
Inspekteur der Jagdflieger
1	Robert Ritter von Greim	Oberstleutnant; Robert Ritter von Greim (1892–1945)	1 August 1935	20 April 1936	263 days
2	Bruno Loerzer	Generalmajor; Bruno Loerzer (1891–1960)	1 April 1938	31 January 1939	305 days
3	Werner Junck	Oberst; Werner Junck (1895–1976)	1 February 1939	4 June 1940	1 year, 124 days
4	Kurt-Bertram von Döring	Generalmajor; Kurt-Bertram von Döring (1889–1960)	19 December 1940	5 August 1941	229 days
General der Jagdflieger
5	Werner Mölders	Oberst; Werner Mölders (1913–1941)	7 August 1941	22 November 1941 †	107 days
6	Adolf Galland	Generalleutnant; Adolf Galland (1912–1996)	5 December 1941	31 January 1945	3 years, 57 days
7	Gordon Gollob	Oberst; Gordon Gollob (1912–1987)	31 January 1945	8 May 1945	97 days

== Subordinated inspectors ==
=== Inspector of the Day Fighters ===
No.	Portrait	Inspekteur der Tagjäger	Took office	Left office	Time in office
1	Günther Lützow	Oberstleutnant; Günther Lützow (1912–1945)	11 August 1942	17 December 1943	1 year, 128 days
2	Hannes Trautloft	Oberst; Hannes Trautloft (1912–1995)	17 December 1943	26 January 1945	1 year, 40 days
3	Walther Dahl	Oberst; Walther Dahl (1916–1985)	26 January 1945	8 May 1945	102 days

=== Inspector of the Day Fighters ===
No.	Portrait	Name (Birth–Death)	Term of office			No.	Portrait	Name (Birth–Death)	Term of office		
No.	Portrait	Name (Birth–Death)	Took office	Left office	Time in office	No.	Portrait	Name (Birth–Death)	Took office	Left office	Time in office
Inspector of the Day Fighters, East						Inspector of the Day Fighters, West					
1		Oberstleutnant; Hannes Trautloft (1912–1995)	6 July 1943	17 December 1943	164 days	1		Oberst; Günther Lützow (1912–1945); Inspekteur der Tagjäger West und Süd	6 July 1943	17 December 1943	164 days
2		Oberst; Karl-Gottfried Nordmann (1915–1982)	9 February 1945	8 May 1945	88 days	2		Oberst; Josef Priller (1915–1961); Inspekteur der Tagjäger West	9 February 1945	8 May 1945	88 days

=== Inspector of the Night Fighters ===
No.	Portrait	Inspekteur der Nachtjagd	Took office	Left office	Time in office
1	Josef Kammhuber	Oberst; Josef Kammhuber (1896–1986)	August 1941	20 November 1943	2 years, 3 months
2	Werner Streib	Oberst; Werner Streib (1911–1986)	March 1944	8 May 1945	1 year, 2 months
