= List of Spanish Cross in Gold with Swords and Diamonds recipients =

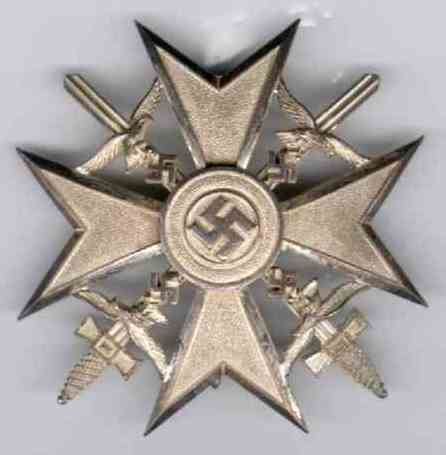
The Spanish Cross in Silver with Swords, a similar but lower award.

The Spanish Cross in Gold with Swords and Diamonds (German: Spanienkreuz in Gold mit Schwertern und Brillanten) was awarded to members of the Condor Legion in recognition of repeated acts above and beyond the call of duty during the Spanish Civil War.

== Description and context ==
The Spanish Cross in Gold with Swords and Diamonds was instituted on 14 April 1939. It was awarded in recognition of repeated acts above and beyond the call of duty. It was awarded 28 times, mostly to members of the Luftwaffe, the air force of Nazi Germany.

The Condor Legion, upon establishment, was made up of Kampfgruppe 88 (K/88), with three squadrons of Junkers Ju 52 bombers and Jagdgruppe 88 (J/88) with three squadrons of Heinkel He 51 fighters. They were supported by the reconnaissance Aufklärungsgruppe 88 (A/88), its maritime division, the Aufklärungsgruppe See 88 (AS/88), an anti-aircraft artillery group, the Flakbteilung 88 (F/88), and a signals group, the Nachrichtenabteilung 88 (LN/88). Overall command was given to Hugo Sperrle, with Alexander Holle as chief of staff. Two armoured units under the command of Wilhelm Ritter von Thoma were also operational.

== Recipients ==
Name	Rank	Unit	Notes	Picture
Wilhelm Balthasar	Oberleutnant (Senior Lieutenant)	J/88	Credited with 6 victories in Spain.	
Otto Bertram	Oberleutnant (Senior Lieutenant)	J/88	Credited with 9 victories in Spain.	—
Peter Boddem	Leutnant (Lieutenant)	J/88	Awarded posthumously after Boddem was killed in a flying accident on 20 March 1939. Credited with 10 victories in Spain.	—
Kraft Eberhardt	Oberleutnant (Senior Lieutenant)	J/88	Awarded posthumously after Eberhardt was shot down over Madrid on 13 November 1936. Credited with 7 victories in Spain.	—
Wilhelm Ensslen	Oberleutnant (Senior Lieutenant)	J/88	Credited with 9 victories in Spain.	—
Paul Fehlhaber	Leutnant (Lieutenant)	LN/88	Awarded posthumously after Fehlhaber was killed by artillery fire near Bilbao on 11 June 1937.	—
Adolf Galland	Oberleutnant (Senior Lieutenant)	J/88	Staffel commander.	
Harro Harder	Hauptmann (Captain)	J/88	Credited with 11 victories in Spain.	—
Martin Harlinghausen	Major (Major)	AS/88		
Oskar Henrici	Leutnant (Lieutenant)	J/88	Awarded posthumously after Henrici was shot down over Madrid on 13 November 1936.	—
Hans-Detlef von Kessel	Oberleutnant (Senior Lieutenant)	A/88	Awarded posthumously after Kessel was shot down near Llanes on 4 September 1937.	—
Günther Lützow	Hauptmann (Captain)	J/88	Credited with 5 victories in Spain.	
Werner Mölders	Hauptmann (Captain)	J/88	Succeeded Galland as Staffel commander in 1938.	
Freiherr Rudolf von Moreau	Hauptmann (Captain)	K/88	Awarded posthumously after von Moreau died whilst testing a new Junkers Ju 88 in Germany on 4 April 1939.	—
Walter Oesau	Oberleutnant (Senior Lieutenant)	J/88	Credited with 9 victories in Spain. Awarded the Spanish Wound Badge after being injured in action.	
Freiherr Wolfram von Richthofen	Generalmajor (Brigadier General)	S/88	Chief of staff of the Condor Legion between 1936 and November 1938, when he took command. Also given the Medalla Militar with Diamonds.	
Heinz Runze	Leutnant (Lieutenant)	A/88	Awarded posthumously after Runze was killed over Teruel on 1 January 1938.	—
Wolfgang Schellmann	Hauptmann (Captain)	J/88	Credited with 12 victories in Spain.	
Joachim Schlichting	Hauptmann (Captain)	J/88	Credited with 5 victories in Spain.	—
Reinhard Seiler	Oberleutnant (Senior Lieutenant)	J/88	Credited with 9 victories in Spain.	
Hugo Sperrle	General der Flieger (General, Luftwaffe)	S/88	Commander of the Condor Legion from November 1936 until October 1937. Also given the Medalla Militar with Diamonds.	
Wilhelm Ritter von Thoma	Oberst (Colonel)	Panzerabteilung Imker (Armoured unit 'Imker')	Given command of the Condor Legion's ground units on 23 September 1936. Led armoured units at the Battle of Madrid. Also awarded the Medalla Militar with Diamonds, the Spanish Campaign medal and the Condor Legion Tank Combat Badge.	
Hellmuth Volkmann	General der Flieger (General, Luftwaffe)	S/88	Commander of the Condor Legion between October 1937 and November 1938. Also given the Medalla Militar with Diamonds.	—
