= Hans-Karl Mayer =

German Spanish Civil War and World War II flying ace

- Born: 9 March 1911; Rufach, German Empire
- Died: 17 October 1940 (aged 29) over the English Channel
- Military career
- Allegiance: Nazi Germany
- Branch: Reichsmarine; Luftwaffe
- Service years: 1933–1940
- Rank: Hauptmann (captain)
- Nickname: Mayer-Ast
- Units: Condor Legion; JG 53
- Conflicts: See battles: Spanish Civil War; World War II Battle of France Battle of Britain †
- Awards: Spanish Cross In Gold with Swords; Knight's Cross of the Iron Cross

Hans-Karl Mayer (9 March 1911 – 17 October 1940) was a German Luftwaffe military aviator and fighter ace during Spanish Civil War and World War II. He is credited with eight aerial victories during the Spanish Civil War and further 31 aerial victories on the Western Front of World War II.

== Early life and career ==
Mayer, nicknamed Mayer-Ast, was born on 9 March 1911 in Rufach at the time in the Imperial Territory of Alsace–Lorraine as part of the German Empire, present-day Rouffach in north-eastern France. He joined the Reichsmarine, the German Navy during the Weimar Republic, before transferring to the newly formed Luftwaffe. During the Spanish Civil War, Mayer volunteered for service with the Condor Legion, a unit composed of volunteers from the Luftwaffe and from the Army which served with the Nationalists. There, he was assigned to 1. Staffel (1st squadron) of Jagdgruppe 88 (J/88—88th Fighter Group) under the command of Oberleutnant Wolfgang Schellmann, claiming eight victories.

On 7 February 1938, Mayer claimed his first two aerial victories when he shot down a Tupolev SB bomber and a Polikarpov I-16 fighter. He was later awarded the Spanish Cross in Gold with Swords (Spanienkreuz in Gold mit Schwertern) on 14 April 1939 for his service in the Spanish Civil War. Upon his return from Spain, Mayer was posted to the 1. Staffel of the Jagdgeschwader 334 (JG 334—334th Fighter Wing). This Staffel was part of I. Gruppe (1st group) of JG 334 commanded by Major Hans-Hugo Witt. On 1 November, the Gruppe was renamed and became I. Gruppe of Jagdgeschwader 133 (JG 133—133rd Fighter Wing). In early 1939, the Gruppe received the then new Messerschmitt Bf 109 E-1 and E-3 fighter aircraft. On 1 May, the unit was again renamed, receiving its final designation, and became the I. Gruppe of Jagdgeschwader 53 (JG 53—53rd Fighter Wing). On 15 March, Mayer's 1 Staffel was placed under the command of Hauptmann Werner Mölders and based at Wiesbaden-Erbenheim Airfield.

== World War II ==
World War II in Europe began on Friday 1 September 1939 when German forces invaded Poland. On 1 October, Mayer was appointed Staffelkapitän (squadron leader) of 1. Staffel, thus succeeding Mölders who was transferred. He claimed his first victory of World War II on 5 November 1939 downing a French Potez 63 reconnaissance aircraft near Saarburg. On 21 April 1940, Mayer claimed his second aerial victory on a fighter sweep mission to the area of Trier-Pirmasens. His claim over a Hawker Hurricane was the sixth for his Staffel and the 24th of I. Gruppe. For this, he received the Iron Cross 2nd Class (Eisernes Kreuz 2. Klasse).

On 10 May 1940, the first day of the Battle of France, I. Gruppe moved to Kirchberg. Flying from Kirchberg on 14 May, I. Gruppe flew missions in support of German forces fighting in the Battle of Sedan. That day, the Gruppe claimed 35 aerial victories, including the five claims filed by Mayer, making him an "ace-in-a-day". In total, Mayer claimed aerial victories during the Battle of France.

During the Battle of Britain he then shot down two Hurricanes over the Isle of Wight on 12 August 1940. On 25 August, Mayer shot down a Hurricane for his 15th victory, possibly that of Flight Lieutenant Alfred Bayne of No. 17 Squadron, who bailed out. Alternatively, according to military aviation historians Christopher Shores and Clive Williams, his victim may have been Pilot Officer Jacques Philippart who bailed out and came down in the English Channel and subsequently died. The next day Mayer shot down two Spitfires. One of his victim was ace Sergeant Cyril Babbage of No. 602 Squadron, who bailed out. Hauptmann Mayer was awarded the Knight's Cross of the Iron Cross (Ritterkreuz des Eisernen Kreuzes) on 3 September.

Mayer was made Gruppenkommandeur (group commander) I. Gruppe of JG 53 on 1 September 1940, he replaced Hauptmann Albert Blumensaat who was transferred. Command of 1. Staffel was passed on to Oberleutnant Hans Ohly. He recorded his 30th victory on 15 September. On 17 October 1940, Mayer took off in Bf 109 E-7 (Werknummer 4138—factory number) on a test flight and never returned, his body washing up on the English coast 10 days later. He was possibly a victim of Flying Officer Desmond McMullen or Sergeant John Burgess, both from No. 222 Squadron RAF. Mayer was the first Luftwaffe Knights Cross recipient to be killed in action. He is buried at Hawkinge Cemetery, Kent. Command of I. Gruppe was then given to Hauptmann Hans-Heinrich Brustellin.

== Summary of career ==
=== Aerial victory claims ===
According to Obermaier, Mayer was credited with 39 aerial victories, eight in the Spanish Civil War and 31 on the Western Front of World War II. Mathews and Foreman, authors of Luftwaffe Aces — Biographies and Victory Claims, researched the German Federal Archives and found documentation for 28 aerial victory claims. This number includes six claims during the Spanish Civil War and 22 over the Western Allies.

Chronicle of aerial victories
This and the ♠ (Ace of spades) indicates those aerial victories which made Mayer an "ace-in-a-day", a term which designates a fighter pilot who has shot down five or more airplanes in a single day. This and the ? (question mark) indicates information discrepancies listed by Forsyth, Prien, Stemmer, Rodeike, Bock, Mathews and Foreman.
Claim	Date	Time	Type	Location	Claim	Date	Time	Type	Location
– 1. Staffel of Jagdgruppe 88 – Spanish Civil War
1	7 February 1938	—	SB-2		? (Note: This claim is not listed by Forsyth.)	10 June 1938	—	SB-2	
2	7 February 1938	—	I-16		5	13 June 1938	—	I-16	
3	21 February 1938	—	I-16		6? (Note: This claim is not listed by Mathews and Foreman.)	16 June 1938	—	SB-2	
4	29 March 1938	—	I-15						
According to Forsyth, Mayer claimed two further aerial victories in Spain. Mathews and Foreman do not list these claims.
World War II
– 1. Staffel of Jagdgeschwader 53 – "Phoney War" — 1 September 1939 – 9 May 1940
1	5 November 1939	15:15	Potez 63	west of Losheim am See	2	21 April 1940	12:05	Hurricane	northwest of Merzig
– 1. Staffel of Jagdgeschwader 2 – Battle of France — 10 May – 25 June 1940
3	11 May 1940	07:53	M.S.406	10–15 km (6.2–9.3 mi) south of Metz	7♠	14 May 1940	16:40	Blenheim	southwest of Sedan
4♠	14 May 1940	16:23	Hurricane	Sedan	8♠	14 May 1940	16:55? (Note: According to Mathews and Foreman claimed at 16:35 as a Bristol Blenheim bomber.)	Battle?	south of Sedan
5♠	14 May 1940	16:24	Battle	Sedan	9	25 May 1940	12:05	Curtiss	south of Attigny
6♠	14 May 1940	16:30	Blenheim	Sedan					
– 1. Staffel of Jagdgeschwader 53 – Battle of Britain and on the English Channel — 26 June – 31 August 1940
10	12 August 1940	13:20	Hurricane	off Isle of Wight-Portsmouth	14	24 August 1940	17:40	Spitfire	Isle of Wight
11	12 August 1940	13:25	Hurricane	English Channel off Isle of Wight-Portsmouth	15	25 August 1940	18:30	Hurricane	west of Portland
12	13 August 1940	17:00	Hurricane	Portland	16	26 August 1940	14:30	Spitfire	east of Portsmouth
13	15 August 1940	18:45	Hurricane	Salisbury	17	26 August 1940	17:35	Spitfire	Portsmouth
– Stab I. Gruppe of Jagdgeschwader 53 – Battle of Britain and on the English Channel — 1 September – 17 October 1940
18	6 September 1940	10:30	Hurricane	northwest of Dungeness	21	15 September 1940	12:45	Spitfire	15 km (9.3 mi) south of London
19	7 September 1940	18:00	Hurricane		22	15 September 1940	13:10	Spitfire	Maidstone
20	9 September 1940	19:05	Hurricane						

=== Awards ===
- Spanish Cross in Gold with Swords (14 April 1939)
- Iron Cross (1939) 2nd and 1st Class
- Knight's Cross of the Iron Cross on 3 September 1940 as Hauptmann and Staffelkapitän in the 1./Jagdgeschwader 53

== Notes ==
Military offices
Preceded by Hauptmann Albert Blumensaat	Commander of I. Gruppe of Jagdgeschwader 53; 1 September 1940 – 17 October 1940	Succeeded by Hauptmann Hans-Heinrich Brustellin
