= Rudolf Schmidt (Major) =

Rudolf "Rudi" Schmidt
- Born: 15 March 1914; Plauen
- Died: 23 February 2000 (aged 85); Esslingen
- Military career
- Allegiance: Weimar Republic (to 1933); Nazi Germany
- Branch: Reichsmarine (1932–35); Kriegsmarine (1935–?); Luftwaffe (?–1945)
- Service years: 1932–45
- Rank: Major
- Nickname: "Rudi"
- Units: Jagdgruppe 88; Kampfgeschwader 26
- Commands: II./Kampfgeschwader 26
- Conflicts: Spanish Civil War; World War II: Invasion of Poland; Norwegian Campaign; Battle of France; Battle of Britain; Invasion of Yugoslavia; Operation Barbarossa; Siege of Sevastopol (1941–1942); Battle of the Mediterranean
- Awards: Knight's Cross of the Iron Cross

Rudolf "Rudi" Schmidt (15 March 1914 – 23 February 2000) was a highly decorated Major in the Luftwaffe during World War II. He was also a recipient of the Knight's Cross of the Iron Cross.

Despite being half Jewish, or Mischling under the Nuremberg Laws, Schmidt enlisted in the Luftwaffe and served with distinction.

== Awards and decorations ==
- Flugzeugführerabzeichen
- Spanish Cross in Gold with Swords
- Front Flying Clasp of the Luftwaffe in Gold with Pennant
- Iron Cross (1939)
  - 2nd Class
  - 1st Class
- German Cross in Gold (13 August 1942)
- Knight's Cross of the Iron Cross on 28 March 1945 as Hauptmann and Gruppenkommandeur of the II./Kampfgeschwader 26

Military offices
Preceded by Major Otto Werner	Commander of II./Kampfgeschwader 26; 11 August 1944 - May 1945	Succeeded by None
