= Joachim Wandel =

German fighter ace and Knight's Cross recipient (1914–1942)

- Born: 7 May 1914; Schlochau
- Died: 7 October 1942 (aged 28); Ostashkov, Russia
- Military career
- Allegiance: Nazi Germany
- Branch: Luftwaffe
- Service years: 1935–1942
- Rank: Hauptmann (captain)
- Nickname: "Gnom"
- Units: Condor Legion; JG 54
- Conflicts: See battles Spanish Civil War World War II: Invasion of Poland; Battle of France; Battle of Britain; Operation Barbarossa; Siege of Leningrad
- Awards: Spanish Cross in Silver with Swords; Knight's Cross of the Iron Cross

Joachim "Gnom" Wandel (7 May 1914 – 7 October 1942) was a German Luftwaffe military aviator in the Spanish Civil War and a fighter ace during World War II. He is credited with 75 victories, two over the Western Front and 73 over the Eastern Front.

Born in Schlochau, present-day Człuchów in northwestern Poland, Wandel served in the Condor Legion during the Spanish Civil War where he was shot down and became a prisoner of war. During World War II, Wandel was appointed Staffelkapitän (squadron leader) of 2. Staffel (2nd squadron) of Jagdgeschwader 76 (JG 76—76th Fighter Wing) in March 1940. He claimed his first aerial victory on 5 June 1940 during the Battle of France. In July 1940, Wandel served as a fighter pilot instructor. In late 1941, he was transferred to Jagdgeschwader 54 (JG 54—54th Fighter Wing) fighting on the Eastern Front, at first serving with the Gruppenstab (headquarters unit) of II. Gruppe (2nd group) of JG 54 before he became Staffelkapitän of 5. Staffel. On 21 August 1942, Wandel was awarded the Knight's Cross of the Iron Cross and was killed in action on 7 October when he was shot down by Soviet fighters near Ostashkov.

== Early life and career ==
Wandel, nicknamed "Gnom", was born on 7 May 1914 in Schlochau, present-day Człuchów in northwestern Poland, at the time in the Province of West Prussia. Wandel had a younger brother Friedrich-Wilhelm who died of wounds on 26 October 1943. (Note: Hauptmann Friedrich-Wilhelm Wandel, as commander of I./Grenadier-Regiment 347 of the 197th Infantry Division, was posthumously awarded the Knight's Cross of the Iron Cross (Ritterkreuz des Eisernen Kreuzes) on 27 October 1943.)

During the Spanish Civil War, Wandel volunteered for service with the Condor Legion in late 1936, a unit composed of volunteers from the Luftwaffe and from the Army which served with the Nationalists. There, he was assigned to 1. Staffel (1st squadron) of Jagdgruppe 88 (J/88—88th Fighter Group). With this unit, he participated in the Bombing of Guernica on 26 April 1937. On 13 May, Wandel was shot down in his Heinkel He 51 by anti-aircraft artillery near Bilbao and taken prisoner of war. Initially, Wandel was sentenced to death but was later exchanged.

For his services in Spain, Wandel received the Spanish Cross in Silver with Swords (Spanienkreuz in Silber mit Schwertern) and was posted to 2. Staffel of Jagdgeschwader 76 (JG 76—76th Fighter Wing). In May 1939, this unit, which consisted of one Gruppe (group), was equipped with the Messerschmitt Bf 109 E-1 and E-3. On 17 August, the Gruppe was ordered from its home airfield at Wien-Aspern to Stubendorf, present-day Izbicko in south-western Poland.

== World War II ==
World War II in Europe began on Friday 1 September 1939 when German forces invaded Poland. Wandel was appointed Staffelkapitän (squadron leader) of 2. Staffel of JG 76 on 1 March 1940. He succeeded Oberleutnant Anton Mader who was transferred. In April 1940, I. Gruppe moved to an airfield at Mainz-Finthen, originally named Fliegerhorst Ober-Olm. The Gruppe stayed at Ober-Olm until the Battle of France began.

On 5 June 1940, Wandel claimed his first aerial victory when he shot down a Morane-Saulnier M.S.406 fighter near Amiens. He claimed one further victory before the Armistice of 22 June 1940, a Hawker Hurricane fighter shot down south of Dieppe on 7 June. The Hurricane possibly belonged to the Royal Air Force No. 43 or No. 601 Squadron. On 26 June 1940, I. Gruppe of JG 76 was moved to the airfield at Waalhaven in the Netherlands and subordinated to Jagdgeschwader 54 (JG 54—54th Fighter Wing). There, the Gruppe was tasked with providing aerial protection over the Dutch coastal area. On 5 July, I./JG 76 was officially integrated into JG 54 and was renamed to II./JG 54 and 2./JG 76 became 5./JG 54. On 31 July 1940, Wandel was transferred to the Jagdfliegerschule (fighter pilot school) at Zerbst. As a result, command of 5. Staffel was passed on to Oberleutnant Roloff von Aspern.

=== War against the Soviet Union ===
Wandel returned to JG 54 in late 1941 where he served as an adjutant to the Gruppenstab (headquarters unit) of II. Gruppe. At the time, II. Gruppe was commanded by Hauptmann Dietrich Hrabak. The Wehrmacht had launched Operation Barbarossa, the invasion of the Soviet Union, on 22 June with II. Gruppe supporting Army Group North in its strategic goal towards Leningrad. In early November, the Gruppe had been withdrawn from the Eastern Front for a period of rest and replenishment where they were based at airfields in Döberitz, and later at Uetersen. On 20 January 1942, the Gruppe began relocating to the Eastern Front where they would be based at Siverskaya near Leningrad. Flying missions over the Volkhov, Wandel claimed his first aerial victory on the Eastern Front over a Polikarpov I-16 fighter on 10 February. Operating from Siverskaya during the Battle of Lyuban, Wandel claimed eight further aerial victories. On 27 February, he shot down an I-18 fighter, an early German designation for a Mikoyan-Gurevich MiG-1 fighter. Wandel then claimed a Petlyakov Pe-2 bomber on 5 March followed by an I-26 fighter, an early German designation for a Yakovlev Yak-1 fighter, on 13 March. Two days later, he claimed an I-18 fighter and an I-26 fighter destroyed. On 16 March, Wandel claimed an unidentified biplane shot down followed by a Pe-2 bomber the next day and an I-18 fighter on 19 March.

On 20 March 1942, II. Gruppe moved to Rjelbitzi Airfield, located 26 kilometers (16 miles) north of Dno and 15 kilometers (9.3 miles) west-southwest of Soltsy on the northern bank of the Shelon. Here, the Gruppe supported German forces fighting in the Demyansk Pocket and Kholm Pocket. Here, Wandel claimed an Ilyushin Il-2 ground-attack aircraft shot down near Staraya Russa on 23 March. Two days later, he claimed two I-18 fighters shot down and again an I-18 fighter on 28 March near Ramushevo on the Lovat south of Lake Ilmen. The next day, he claimed another I-18 fighter. On 4 April, Wandel reported an I-18 fighter and an Il-2 ground-attack aircraft shot down. On 23 April, he was credited with a Yak-1 destroyed.

=== Squadron leader and death ===
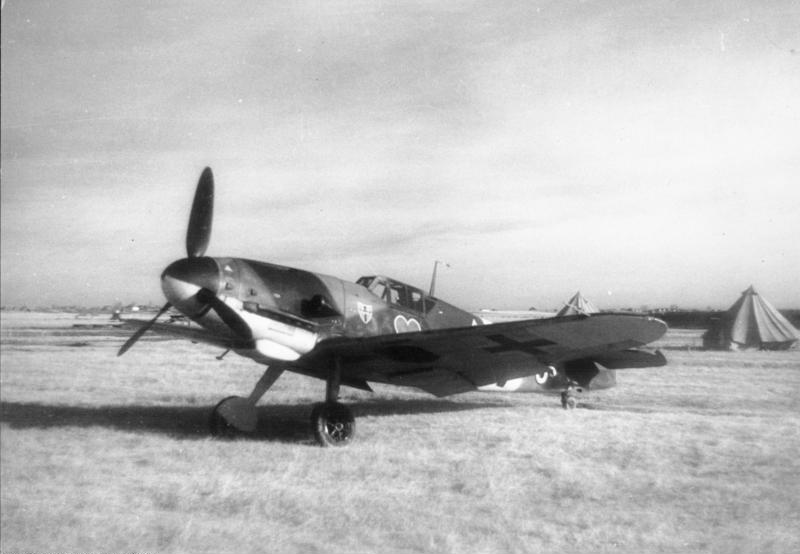
A Bf 109 G-2 of III./JG 54 in August 1942, similar to those flown by Wandel

On 21 April, Oberleutnant Wolfgang Späte, the commander of 5. Staffel of JG 54 was transferred. In consequence, Wandel succeeded Späte as Staffelkapitän of 5. Staffel. In combat south of Lake Ilmen, Wandel claimed his first two aerial victories as Staffelkapitän on 25 April when he shot down two Il-2 ground-attack aircraft. In July 1942, II. Gruppe was re-equipped with the Bf 109 G-2. Wandel then became an "ace-in-a-day" for the first time on 7 July when he shot down six Soviet aircraft. On the night of 19/20 July, Wandel claimed his 50th aerial victory in nocturnal combat. That night he was credited with shooting down two Polikarpov Po-2 night ground-attack aircraft, also referred to as U-2, near Ramushevo.

Wandel again became an "ace-in-a-day" on 9 August during the Battle of Rzhev. That day, he claimed five Mikoyan-Gurevich MiG-3 fighters shot down near Zubtsov. On 12 August, 5. Staffel was detached from II. Gruppe and sent to Oryol where they were based at an airfield named Oryol-West. On 21 August, he was awarded the Knight's Cross of the Iron Cross (Ritterkreuz des Eisernen Kreuzes). On 7 October, Wandel was credited with his 75th and last aerial victory when he shot down a Lavochkin-Gorbunov-Gudkov LaGG-3 fighter near Ostashkov. He was then shot down and killed in action with other Soviet LaGG-3 fighters. His Bf 109 G-2 (Werknummer 10353—factory number) crashed northeast of Ostashkov. He was replaced by Leutnant Horst Hannig as commander of 5. Staffel the following day.

== Summary of career ==
=== Aerial victory claims ===
According to US historian David T. Zabecki, Wandel was credited with 75 aerial victories. Spick also lists him with 75 enemy aircraft shot down claimed in an unknown number of combat missions, including 16 during nocturnal combat. Heaton, Lewis, Olds and Schulze also list him with 75 aerial victories. Mathews and Foreman, authors of Luftwaffe Aces — Biographies and Victory Claims, researched the German Federal Archives and found records for 74 aerial victory claims, plus one further unconfirmed claim. This figure of confirmed claims includes 72 aerial victories on the Eastern Front and two on the Western Front.

Victory claims were logged to a map-reference (PQ = Planquadrat), for example "PQ 18282". The Luftwaffe grid map (Jägermeldenetz) covered all of Europe, western Russia and North Africa and was composed of rectangles measuring 15 minutes of latitude by 30 minutes of longitude, an area of about 360 square miles (930 km^{2}). These sectors were then subdivided into 36 smaller units to give a location area 3 km × 4 km (1.9 mi × 2.5 mi) in size.

Chronicle of aerial victories
This and the ♠ (Ace of spades) indicates those aerial victories which made Wandel an "ace-in-a-day", a term which designates a fighter pilot who has shot down five or more airplanes in one day. This and the ? (question mark) indicates information discrepancies listed by Prien, Stemmer, Rodeike, Bock, Mathews and Foreman.
Claim	Date	Time	Type	Location	Claim	Date	Time	Type	Location
– 2. Staffel of Jagdgeschwader 76 – Battle of France — 10 May – 25 June 1940
1	5 June 1940	11:00	M.S.405	Amiens	2	7 June 1940	20:45	Hurricane	south of Dieppe
– Stab of II. Gruppe of Jagdgeschwader 54 – Eastern Front — 20 January – 23 April 1942
3	10 February 1942	16:16	I-16		12	23 March 1942	14:43	Il-2	15 km (9.3 mi) northeast of Staraya Russa
4	27 February 1942	08:25	I-18 (MiG-1)	15 km (9.3 mi) southwest of Kirishi	13	26 March 1942	10:45	I-18 (MiG-1)	
5	5 March 1942	14:40	Pe-2		14	26 March 1942	10:45	I-18 (MiG-1)	
6	13 March 1942	16:50	I-26 (Yak-1)		15	28 March 1942	15:18	I-18 (MiG-1)	Ramushevo
7	15 March 1942	11:25	I-18 (MiG-1)		16	29 March 1942	15:37	I-18 (MiG-1)	10 km (6.2 mi) northeast of Staraya Russa
8	15 March 1942	16:24	I-26 (Yak-1)	east of Sawisha	17	4 April 1942	12:06	I-18 (MiG-1)	
9	16 March 1942	16:15	biplane (Seversky)		18	4 April 1942	15:17	Il-2	
10	17 March 1942	11:25	Pe-2		19	23 April 1942	18:40	Yak-1	
11	19 March 1942	17:08	I-18 (MiG-1)	10 km (6.2 mi) southeast of Gremjatschewo					
– 5. Staffel of Jagdgeschwader 54 – Eastern Front — 24 – 30 April 1942
20	25 April 1942	13:16	Il-2		22	28 April 1942	09:32	Yak-1	10 km (6.2 mi) northeast of Ramushevo
21	25 April 1942	13:17	Il-2	5 km (3.1 mi) east of Ramushevo					
– 5. Staffel of Jagdgeschwader 54 – Eastern Front — 1 May – 7 October 1942
23	7 May 1942	15:50	Yak-1	north of Demyansk	50	20 July 1942	01:15	U-2	Ramushevo
24	9 May 1942	13:25	Il-2		51	3 August 1942	01:35	U-2	PQ 18282; 30 km (19 mi) southeast of Staraya Russa
25	20 May 1942	11:06	Pe-2		52	3 August 1942	01:45	U-2	PQ 18282; 30 km (19 mi) southeast of Staraya Russa
26	20 May 1942	11:07	Pe-2		53	3 August 1942	02:00	U-2	northeast of Ramushevo
27	29 May 1942	10:26	MiG-3		54	6 August 1942	19:35	Yak-1	PQ 4786
28	2 June 1942	08:45	Pe-2		55	7 August 1942	18:07	Yak-1	PQ 57514
29	2 June 1942	08:46	Pe-2		56	8 August 1942	19:37	R-5	PQ 46223; 25 km (16 mi) south-southeast of Zubtsov
30	3 June 1942	15:20	Yak-1		57♠	9 August 1942	10:10	MiG-3	PQ 47814 vicinity of Zubtsov
31	7 June 1942	08:12	Il-2		58♠	9 August 1942	10:18	MiG-3	PQ 47881; 20 km (12 mi) southeast of Zubtsov
32	9 June 1942	10:05	Pe-2		59♠	9 August 1942	13:50	MiG-3	north of Jakowlew
33	9 June 1942	10:06	Pe-2		60♠	9 August 1942	13:52	MiG-3	PQ 56163
34	14 June 1942	19:23	Il-2		61♠	9 August 1942	14:12	MiG-3	PQ 47821; 10 km (6.2 mi) northeast of Zubtsov
35	16 June 1942	18:23	Yak-1		62	10 August 1942	18:49	MiG-3	PQ 47551; 15 km (9.3 mi) northwest of Rzhev
36	26 June 1942	00:25	U-2		63	10 August 1942	18:57	MiG-3	PQ 47551; 15 km (9.3 mi) northwest of Rzhev
37	26 June 1942	00:40	R-5		64	11 August 1942	08:48	Yak-1? (Note: According to Mathews and Foreman claimed as a Lavochkin-Gorbunov-Gudkov LaGG-3.)	PQ 47481; 10 km (6.2 mi) west of Staritsa
38	6 July 1942	23:50	U-2	Demyansk	65	12 August 1942	18:55	Yak-1	PQ 54274; 35 km (22 mi) west of Belyov
39♠	7 July 1942	00:05	TB-3 (Ant-6)	Kraseja	66	12 August 1942	18:57	Yak-1	PQ 54242; 25 km (16 mi) south-southeast of Sukhinichi
40♠	7 July 1942	00:32	U-2	Kraseja	67	14 August 1942	18:45	Yak-1	PQ 54223; 25 km (16 mi) southeast of Sukhinichi
41♠	7 July 1942	00:56	U-2	Ramushevo	68	18 August 1942	08:58	I-16	PQ 54221; 25 km (16 mi) southeast of Sukhinichi
42♠	7 July 1942	22:50	SB-2	Korostyn	69	18 August 1942	11:55	Yak-1	PQ 54223; 25 km (16 mi) southeast of Sukhinichi
43♠	7 July 1942	23:09	U-2	Ramushevo	70	18 August 1942	17:05? (Note: According to Mathews and Foreman claimed at 17:15.)	I-180 (Yak-7)	PQ 55842; 15 km (9.3 mi) east of Sukhinichi
44♠	7 July 1942	23:18	U-2	Ramushevo	71	19 August 1942	10:05	Yak-1	PQ 55874; 15 km (9.3 mi) southeast of Sukhinichi
45	8 July 1942	00:33	U-2	Ramushevo	72	19 August 1942	10:10	Yak-1	PQ 55874; 35 km (22 mi) south-southeast of Wenden
46? (Note: According to Mathews and Foreman this claim is unconfirmed.)	13 July 1942	night	MiG-3	Leningrad	73	26 August 1942	08:46	LaGG-3	PQ 47672; 15 km (9.3 mi) east of Rzhev
47	18 July 1942	17:34	Yak-1	east of Wjasma	74	6 October 1942	09:25	Il-2	PQ 38861; 45 km (28 mi) east of Ostashkov
48	18 July 1942	18:11	LaGG-3	Koscheljewo	75	7 October 1942	10:30	LaGG-3	PQ 3881 southeast of Lake Ilmen
49	20 July 1942	00:25	U-2	Ramushevo					

=== Awards ===
- Spanish Cross in Silver with Swords (14 April 1939)
- Honour Goblet of the Luftwaffe on 1 July 1942 as Hauptmann and Staffelkapitän (Note: According to Obermaier on 28 May 1942.)
- German Cross in Gold on 27 July 1942 as Hauptmann in the II./Jagdgeschwader 54
- Knight's Cross of the Iron Cross on 21 August 1942 as Hauptmann and Staffelkapitän of the 5./Jagdgeschwader 54 (Note: According to Scherzer on 23 August 1942.)
