= Timeline of the Spanish Civil War =

Chronology of events in the Spanish Civil War (1936-39)

The Timeline of the Spanish Civil War allows observation of the proceedings of the Spanish Civil War between 1936 and 1939.

== History of the Spanish Civil War, by year ==
- 1936 in the Spanish Civil War
- 1937 in the Spanish Civil War
- 1938–39 in the Spanish Civil War

== See also ==
- List of foreign ships wrecked or lost in the Spanish Civil War
- List of Spanish Civil War films
- List of Spanish Civil War flying aces
- List of Spanish Cross in Gold with Swords and Diamonds recipients
- List of tanks in the Spanish Civil War
- List of war films and TV specials: Spanish Civil War
- Martyrs of the Spanish Civil War
- Spain during World War II
- Spanish Republican Armed Forces
