= Jagdfliegerführer Ostmark =

Nazi military unit

Jagdfliegerführer Ostmark (Fighter Leader Ostmark) was formed September 6, 1943 in Vienna, subordinated to 7. Jagd-Division. The headquarters was located at Wien-Kobenzl. The unit was redesignated 8. Jagd-Division on June 15, 1944.

== Commanding officers ==
- Oberst Gotthard Handrick, September 1943 – June 1944
