= Gotthard Handrick =

German Olympic athlete & Luftwaffe fighter pilot (1908-1978)

- Gotthard Handrick at the 1936 Olympic Games
- Born: 25 October 1908; Zittau, German Empire
- Died: 30 May 1978 (aged 69); Ahrensburg, West Germany
- Sports career
- Country: Nazi Germany
- Sport: Modern pentathlon

Sports achievements and titles
- Olympic finals: 1936 Berlin
Medal record
Men's Modern pentathlon
Gold medal – first place	1936 Berlin	Modern pentathlon
- Military career
- Allegiance: Nazi Germany
- Branch: Luftwaffe
- Service years: 1929–45
- Rank: Oberst (colonel)
- Commands: JG 26, JG 77, JG 5
- Conflicts: Spanish Civil War; World War II
- Awards: Spanish Cross in Gold with Swords; German Cross in Gold

Gotthard Handrick (25 October 1908 – 30 May 1978) was a German Olympic athlete and German fighter pilot during the Spanish Civil War and World War II.

== Career ==
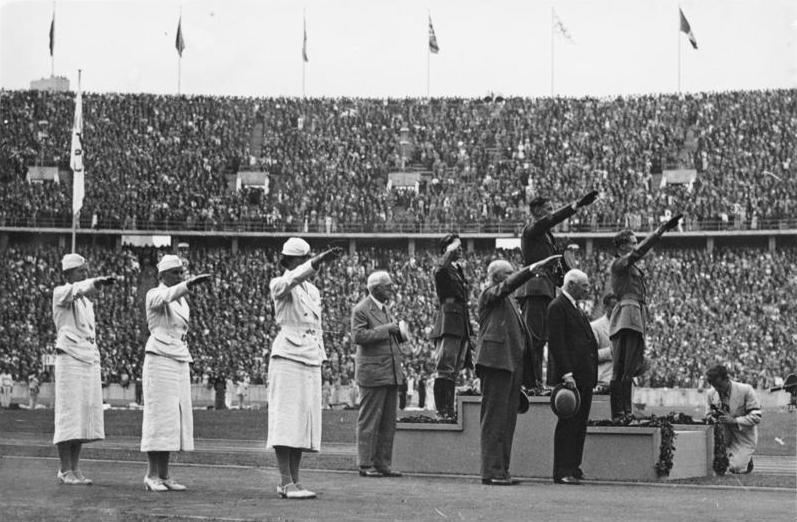
Medal presentation at the 1936 Olympic games, with Handrick in 1st place

Handrick was born on 25 October 1908 in Zittau, at the time in the Kingdom of Saxony as part of the German Empire. He won the gold medal in the modern pentathlon at the 1936 Summer Olympics in Berlin.

In July 1937, Handrick was appointed Gruppenkommandeur (group commander) of Jagdgruppe 88 (18 July 1937 – 10 September 1938). This unit fought in the Spanish Civil War where he claimed five aerial victories while flying for the Legion Condor, including a Polikarpov I-15 fighter on 9 September 1937 and an Polikarpov I-16 fighter on 18 May 1938. He was later awarded the Spanish Cross in Gold with Swords (Spanienkreuz in Gold mit Schwertern) on 14 April 1939 for his service in the Spanish Civil War.

Handrick was then given command of I. Gruppe of Jagdgeschwader 132 "Schlageter" on 11 September 1938 after his return from Spain. This unit then became I. Gruppe of Jagdgeschwader 26 "Schlageter" on 1 May 1939 which he led until 23 June 1940. On 24 June 1940 command of JG 26 was handed over to Major Handrick, who passed command of I./JG 26 to Hauptmann Kurt Fischer. After he left JG 26, Handrick served with the Luftwaffenmission Rumänien (Luftwaffe Mission Romania) under the command of Generalleutnant (equivalent to major general) Wilhelm Speidel.

On 7 October, Handrick took over command of III. Gruppe of Jagdgeschwader 52 (JG 52—52nd Fighter Wing) from Hauptmann Alexander von Winterfeld who was transferred. He led this Gruppe until 23 June 1941. Command of the Gruppe was then given to Major Albert Blumensaat.

=== Wing commander ===
In June 1941, Handrick was transferred and became the Geschwaderkommodore (wing commander) of Jagdgeschwader 77 (JG 77—77th Fighter Wing). While serving on the Eastern Front he claimed a Mikoyan-Gurevich MiG-3 fighter on 29 September and a Petlyakov Pe-2 bomber on 22 October 1941.

During World War II he was a recipient of the German Cross in Gold (Deutsches Kreuz in Gold) on 17 October 1943. In March 1942, Oberstleutnant Handrick transferred to command Jagdgeschwader 5 (JG 5—5th Fighter Wing) in Norway and Northern Russia. From June 1943 to June 1944 he was Jagdfliegerführer Ostmark. Then as an Oberst, he became the commanding officer of 8. Jagd-Division in Austria, a position he held until the end of the war. After the war he worked in Hamburg as a representative of Daimler-Benz.

== Awards ==
- Spanish Cross in Gold with Swords (14 April 1939)
- Iron Cross 2nd and 1st Class
- German Cross in Gold on 17 October 1943 as Oberst in Jagdgeschwader 5

Military offices
Preceded by Major Hans Hugo Witt	Commander of Jagdgeschwader 26 Schlageter; 24 June 1940 – 21 August 1940	Succeeded by Oberstleutnant Adolf Galland
Preceded by Major Bernhard Woldenga	Commander of Jagdgeschwader 77 Herz As; 23 June 1941 – May 1942	Succeeded by Major Gordon Gollob
Preceded by none	Commander of Jagdgeschwader 5 Eismeer; March 1942 – 31 August 1943	Succeeded by Oberstleutnant Günther Scholz
Preceded by none	Commander of Jagdfliegerführer Ostmark; 15 June 1943 – 15 June 1944	Succeeded by: 8. Jagd-Division
Preceded by Jagdfliegerführer Ostmark	Commander of 8. Jagd-Division; 15 June 1944 – 8 May 1945	Succeeded by none
