= 8th Fighter Division =

Military formation of the Luftwaffe

The 8th Fighter Division (German: 8. Jagd-Division) was a military formation of the German Luftwaffe in World War II.

The 8th Fighter Division was formed 15 June 1944 in Wien-Kobenzel from the Jagdfliegerführer Ostmark and subordinated to the I. Jagdkorps. The Division was subordinated to the IX. (J) Fliegerkorps in April 1945 and transferred to Wolfsleithen and put under the command of Luftwaffenkommando 4.

== Commanding officers ==
- Oberst Gotthard Handrick, 15 June 1943 – May 1945
