= Karl-Heinz Greisert =

- Born: 2 February 1908
- Died: 22 July 1942 (aged 34); Donets River basin
- Military career
- Allegiance: Nazi Germany
- Branch: Luftwaffe
- Service years: 1936-1942
- Rank: Major
- Nickname: Heino
- Units: Condor Legion, JG 2, JG 3
- Commands: II Gruppe JG 2 JG 2 III Gruppe JG 3
- Conflicts: Spanish Civil War; World War II Battle of France Battle of Britain Case Blue
- Awards: Spanish Cross in Gold with Swords; Deutsches Kreuz; Iron Cross (1st and 2nd Class)

Karl-Heinz Greisert (2 February 1908 – 22 July 1942) was an officer in the Luftwaffe. He served in the Condor Legion during the Spanish Civil War. During the Second World War he participated in the air battles over France and England. He was made commanding officer of II Gruppe of Jagdgeschwader 2. For three months he served as acting commander of JG 2 after his commander had been killed in action. Following the Battle of Britain he remained in the west and was involved in a number of air battles over the English Channel and northern France. In June 1942 he was transferred to the eastern Front where he took command of III Gruppe of JG 3. A month later he was killed in action in the course of a low altitude air battle. He was credited with 34 victories, and was a recipient of the Spanish Cross and the German Cross in Gold.

== Early life ==
Karl-Heinz “Heino” Greisert was born on 2 February 1908. Greisert joined the Luftwaffe in 1936 at the age of 28. Though still a young man, he was considered old for a fighter pilot. He was sent to Spain to serve in the Condor Legion during the Spanish Civil War. He was assigned to 2. Staffel of J 88 when the unit first formed at the end of November 1936. He performed a number of combat patrols and on 30 November 1937 shot down a Republican Polikarpov I-16 fighter. Greisert returned to Germany in early 1938, and was followed by the rest of J/88 when the unit was withdrawn in April 1939.

== Western theater ==
At the outbreak of the Second World War Greisert was serving in II Gruppe of JG 2. He participated in the Battle of France. By the end of the campaign he had been credited with 6 victories, bringing his total to 7. He participated in many of the air battles of the Battle of Britain. A week into the battle on 18 July he was credited with downing a Spitfire over the Isle of Wight. In August he was credited with two more victories, both over Hurricanes. On 3 September 1940 he was given command of his Gruppe. Two months later on 28 November 1940 Jagdschwader 2 lost its commander, Major Helmut Wick, when he failed to return from a mission over the English Channel. Though still a Hauptman, Greisert was made acting commander of JG 2. He held this post until 16 February 1941 when the permanent replacement, Major Wilhelm Balthasar, took over the position.

In the spring of 1941 Luftwaffe strength in the west was decreased as units were moved to the east to support Operation Barbarossa, the German invasion of Soviet Russia. JG 2 and JG 26 were left in the west to provide an air defense. After the German's invasion of Russia that June the RAF began a series of incursion raids they called Circus operations in the hopes of aiding the Soviet effort by draining German strength and forcing them to pull units back from the east. These missions resulted in a number of combats over northern France. On 20 September 1941 Greisert was credited with his 20th victory, over a Spitfire. A week later he was credited his 21st, also over a Spitfire. In the coming months Greisert played a significant role in two of the more dramatic missions of this period.

=== The Channel Dash ===
In February 1942 the Kriegsmarine was ordered to move its capital ships from Brest to German waters, to be in a position to intervene in a feared invasion of German occupied Norway. The Luftwaffe's Adolf Galland was given responsibility to provide air cover for the Scharnhorst-class battleships Scharnhorst and Gneisenau and heavy cruiser Prinz Eugen during the Channel Dash of 12 February 1942. Operation Donnerkeil (Operation Thunderbolt), as the German air-cover plan was called, made use of Greisert's JG 2 for the middle portion of the channel transit. To keep up a continuous air coverage the group would ferry aircraft out over the force. As the fighters had limited range, the group moved up to the airfield at Calais-Marck for the operation. With limited aircraft and limited range, only 16 aircraft could be provided at a time. The covering fighter group was tasked with providing both a low and high level cover, with 8 aircraft at each level flying in two Schwarms of four. Units would fly out, provide cover for a period of time, be replaced and fly back to the airfield, get refueled and fly back out in a continuous rotation. Greisert and his Gruppe were tasked with providing air cover in this fashion from daybreak till 1:00 pm, when they were to be relieved by JG 26.

The day of the operation was blustery and rainy, obscuring visibility. The German vessels slipped Brest at 9:00 pm in the dark of the evening of 11 February. Daybreak found them steaming towards the Strait of Dover. The ships were nearly through when they were finally spotted at 11:00 am. They had just cleared the straits with JG 2's period of responsibility coming to an end when the German warships came under air attack. 6 torpedo carrying Fairey Swordfish of 825 Squadron under the command of Eugene Esmonde approached at low level. The Swordfish had set off to the target alone, but by good fortune were spotted en route by 72 Squadron commanding officer Brian Kingcome, who attempted to cover them on their way in with his 10 Spitfires. Unfortunately the attack came in just as the Germans were handing off responsibilities from JG 2 to JG 26, and aircraft from both jagdgeschwader were present as Esmonde approached the force. Kingcome's escorting Spitfires were soon heavily engaged by German fighters, allowing the low cover aircraft of JG 2 to attack the Swordfish unimpeded. Greisert, flying in the low cover group, closed to attack as the force was some 10 kilometers north of Gravelines, and was credited with two Fairey Swordfish shot down.

=== The Augsburg raid ===
On 17 April 1942 Bomber Command chanced a daylight raid to Augsburg in southern Germany, where they were to bomb the MAN U-boat engine plant. As no British fighter had the range to accompany the bombers much past 200 miles, the plan was to run diversionary raids to the north and south of the entry point to pull the German fighters away. With German air units spread thinly along the coast, it was thought once the bombers got past these they would stand a good chance to reach Augsburg. They were to fly at low level all the way to the target to avoid detection by German radar. The force would use the newly arrived Lancaster bomber, 12 of which were tasked with this mission, 6 from 44 (Rhodesia) Squadron and 6 from No. 97 Squadron. On the day of the raid, Greisert and other elements of his Jagdschwader engaged Boston bombers and their escorts as they conducted a bombing raid over the harbor facilities at Cherbourg, shooting down one of their number. The German fighters were returning to base just as the Lancaster force was passing near their airfield. As the German aviators approached their air base at Beaumont-le-Roger they caught sight of the British bombers flying at high speed and very low level a short distance away. Greisert snapped up his landing gear and veered off, leading his Gruppe in pursuit of the bombers. The aircraft turned out to be a group of Lancaster bombers, a type unfamiliar to the Germans.

Greisert was able to close and shoot down one of their number. It was the last aerial victory for Greisert in the west. Three other Lancasters of 44 Squadron were shot down before JG 2's attacks were broken off. Soon Greisert would be transferred to the east to take command of III Gruppe of JG 3. Greisert remained in charge of II Gruppe of JG 2 until 8 May 1942. He had accumulated 22 victories over French and British aircraft while serving in the Western Front.

== Eastern theater ==
On 18 May 1942, Greisert was promoted to Major and appointed commanding officer of III Gruppe of JG 3, based on the Eastern Front. The Jagdschwarder was operating in the Donetz river valley in support of the German drive towards the Caucus oil fields and Stalingrad during Case Blue. Operating in the east the frequency of air combat was high, with most of the engagements fought at low altitude. In the first two weeks of July Greisert was credited with 8 aircraft shot down, including five Il-2 Sturmovik ground-attack aircraft. On 22 July 1942, Greisert became engaged in a low-level aerial combat with Russian I-16 fighters. His Bf 109 F-4 aircraft was damaged and he was forced to bail out. Greisert escaped from his aircraft but being at very low altitude his parachute failed to open fully before he struck the ground, and he was killed.

At the time of his death Greisert had been credited with 34 victories. His victory total included eleven Spitfires and six Il-2 Sturmoviks. He was a recipient of the Spanish Cross and the German Cross in Gold.

== Awards ==
- German Cross in Gold on 5 June 1942 as Major in the II./Jagdgeschwader 2
- Iron Cross (1st and 2nd Class)
- Spanish Cross

Military offices
Preceded by Major Helmut Wick	Commander of Jagdgeschwader 2 Richthofen; 28 November 1940 – 16 February 1941	Succeeded by Hauptmann Wilhelm Balthasar
