= Jacques Philippart =

Belgian flying ace of WWII

- Born: 11 January 1909; Mont-Saint-Guibert, Belgium
- Died: 25 August 1940 (aged 31); English Channel
- Burial place: Belgian Airmen's Field of Honour, Brussels, Belgium
- Military career
- Allegiance: Belgium
- Branch: Belgian Air Force (1932–1940); Royal Air Force (1940)
- Rank: Pilot officer
- Unit: No. 213 Squadron
- Conflicts: Second World War: German invasion of Belgium; Battle of Britain
- Awards: Croix de Guerre (Belgium); Cross of the Order of Leopold with Palm (Belgium); Knight's Cross of the Order of Orange-Nassau (Netherlands)

Jacques Philippart (11 January 1909 – 25 August 1940) was a Belgian flying ace who served in the Royal Air Force (RAF) during the Second World War. The first Belgian flying ace of the war, he is credited with the destruction of at least six aircraft.

Born in Mont-Saint-Guibert, Philippart joined the Aeronautique Militaire (Belgian Air Force) in 1932. He became well regarded for his flying ability, and was an aerobatic pilot. He flew in combat operations during the German invasion of Belgium in May 1940 but was withdrawn to France and served at the headquarters of the Aeronautique Militaire. Evacuated to the United Kingdom after the fall of France in June, he joined the RAF and was posted to No. 213 Squadron. He shot down a number of German aircraft during the Battle of Britain but was killed on 25 August after claiming his final aerial victory.

== Early life ==
Jacques Arthur Laurent Philippart was born on 11 January 1909 at Mont-Saint-Guibert, in Belgium. He was a university student when he decided to join the Aeronautique Militaire (Belgian Air Force) in 1932, training at Wevelgem. Appointed a sergeant pilot, he became well regarded for his flying skills and represented Belgium in an aerobatic competition in Switzerland in 1937. By this time, he was a commissioned officer. In May 1938, he was part of the aerial escort for King Leopold III's visit to Holland for the baptism of Beatrix of the Netherlands. For this service, he was appointed a Knight of the Order of Orange-Nassau by Queen Wilhelmina of the Netherlands.

== Second World War ==
Shortly after the outbreak of the Second World War, Philippart was sent to the United Kingdom where he investigated the operational techniques of the Royal Air Force (RAF) with a view to passing on this knowledge to Belgian aircrew. In May 1940, when the Germans invaded Belgium, he flew a number of sorties before being withdrawn to France, along with much of the Belgian armed forces. There he was attached to the headquarters of the commander of the surviving elements of the Aeronautique Militaire, General Legros, liaising with the RAF which required regular trips to the United Kingdom. He was eventually evacuated from Bayonne, disembarking from a Dutch vessel at Plymouth on 23 June.

=== Battle of Britain ===
By agreement with the Belgian government in exile, pilots like Philippart were enlisted into the Royal Air Force Volunteer Reserve while serving with the RAF. Holding the rank of pilot officer, in early July he was sent to No. 7 Operational Training Unit at Hawarden to train on the Hawker Hurricane fighter. Philippart was then posted to No. 213 Squadron on 23 July. His new unit, equipped with Hurricanes, was based at Exeter in Devon, as part of No. 10 Group, and tasked with interception duties and patrolling along the English Channel.

Philippart destroyed a Junkers Ju 88 medium bomber over Portland Bill on 11 August. This was followed three days later with his shooting down of three Messerschmitt Bf 110 heavy fighters to the south of Portland Bill. He also claimed a fourth Bf 110 as probably destroyed. On 22 August, he destroyed a Ju 88 to the south of Exmouth; with this aerial victory, Philippart became the first Belgian flying ace of the Second World War.

On 25 August, Philippart destroyed a Ju 88 near Portland but was shot down after this engagement by Hans-Karl Mayer of Jagdgeschwader 53 (fighter wing 53). Philippart bailed out before his Hurricane crashed into the English Channel, coming down into the sea as well. He did not survive in the water and his body was recovered when it drifted onto the English coast a few days later.

Philippart was posthumously awarded the Belgian Croix de Guerre in January 1943. After the war, in September 1946, he received another posthumous award, the Cross of the Order of Leopold with Palm. Originally buried in Exeter Cemetery, his body was relocated to Belgium and reinterred in the Belgian Airmen's Field of Honour at the Brussels Cemetery in October 1949.

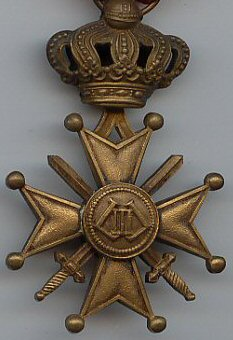
Philippart was posthumously awarded the Belgian Croix de Guerre in 1943

Military aviation historians Christopher Shores and Clive Williams credit Philippart with having destroyed six German aircraft, with another aircraft considered probably destroyed.
