= Rolf Kaldrack =

German World War II flying ace

- Kaldrack as a Hauptmann; Note: The Oak Leaves at his neck is a photomontage
- Born: 25 June 1913; Stargard, Pomerania, German Empire
- Died: 3 February 1942 (aged 28) south of Toropets, Soviet Union
- Military career
- Allegiance: Nazi Germany
- Branch: Kriegsmarine (to 1935); Luftwaffe
- Service years: 1934–1942
- Rank: Hauptmann (captain)
- Unit: Condor Legion (A 88)
- Commands: III./ZG 76, II./SKG 210
- Conflicts: See battles Spanish Civil War World War II: Battle of the Heligoland Bight; Battle of France; Battle of Britain; Eastern Front; Operation Barbarossa; Toropets–Kholm offensive †
- Awards: Spanish Cross in Gold with Swords; Knight's Cross of the Iron Cross with Oak Leaves

Rolf Kaldrack (25 June 1913 – 3 February 1942) was a Luftwaffe fighter ace and recipient of the Knight's Cross of the Iron Cross with Oak Leaves during World War II. Kaldrack is credited with at least 24 aerial victories, 3 of which claimed during the Spanish Civil War flying with Aufklärungsgruppe 88 of the Condor Legion.

== Early life and career ==
Kaldrack was born on 25 June 1913 in Stargard, at the time in the Province of Pomerania of the German Empire, present-day in northwestern Poland. He was the son of officer Otto Kaldrack who served as a Generalmajor in the Wehrmacht. Kaldrack volunteered for military service in the Kriegsmarine of Nazi Germany in 1934 and transferred to the Luftwaffe a year later.

In November 1936 during the Spanish Civil War, Kaldrack served as an aerial observer, flying missions on a Heinkel He 70 Blitz aerial reconnaissance aircraft belonging to Aufklärungsgruppe 88 of the Condor Legion. In March 1937, he flew on as an aerial observer with Kampfgruppe 88. Kaldrack later claimed three aerial victories in Spain and was awarded the Spanish Cross in Gold with Swords (Spanienkreuz in Gold mit Schwertern) on 14 April 1939, for his service in the Spanish Civil War. After he returned from Spain, Kaldrack served on the staff of Generaloberst Erhard Milch in the Reichsluftfahrtministerium (RLM—Ministry of Aviation).

In early 1939, Kaldrack, together with Wilhelm Balthasar and Anhäuser, flew a Siebel Fh 104 Hallore twin-engined transport aircraft on one of the longest flights to Africa, covering 40,000 kilometers (25,000 miles). In July, Kaldrack was posted to II. Gruppe (2nd group) of Zerstörergeschwader 1 (ZG 1—1st Destroyer Wing). Here, Kaldrack initial served with 6. Staffel (6th squadron) of ZG 1 under the command of Oberleutnant Dietrich Robitzsch.

== World War II ==
World War II in Europe began on Friday 1 September 1939 when German forces invaded Poland. On 21 September, II. Gruppe of ZG 1 was renamed and became Jagdgruppe 101 (JGr. 101—101st Fighter Group). In consequence, 6. Staffel of ZG 1 became the 3. Staffel of JGr. 101. On 31 October, JGr. 101 moved to Neumünster airfield in northern Germany.

On 18 December, during the Battle of the Heligoland Bight, Kaldrack claimed his first aerial victory when he shot down a Royal Air Force (RAF) Vickers Wellington approximately 20 kilometers (12 miles) southwest of Heligoland. During the aerial battle, his Messerschmitt Bf 109 E-1 (Werknummer 3397—factory number) sustained combat damage, resulting in a forced landing at Westerland on the island of Sylt. For this victory, Kaldrack received the Iron Cross 2nd Class (Eisernes Kreuz 2. Klasse) the next day.

Later in December, Kaldrack was transferred and appointed Staffelkapitän (squadron leader) of 1. Staffel of JGr. 101, replacing Hauptmann Hans-Otto Winterer. On 1 March 1940, the Staffel became the 4. Staffel of ZG 1. Kaldrack claimed his second aerial victory on 24 May during the Battle of France. He claimed his victory over a Westland Lysander aircraft, although it may have been Latécoère 298 aircraft although his Messerschmitt Bf 110 sustained combat damage. During the landing attempt at Trier-Euren Airfield, the aircraft overturned injuring Kaldrack and his radio operator Feldwebel Eich Hermanski. On 9 June, he was awarded the Iron Cross 1st Class (Eisernes Kreuz 1. Klasse).

On 26 June, II. Gruppe of ZG 1 was renamed and became III. Gruppe of Zerstörergeschwader 76 (ZG 76—76th Destroyer Wing). In consequence, Kaldrack commanded 7. Staffel of ZG 76. On 11 July, during the Kanalkampf phase of the Battle of Britain, III. Gruppe of ZG 76 supported Junkers Ju 87 dive bombers in their attack on enemy shipping. The Ju 87 dive bombers sank HMS Warrior. In support of this attack, Kaldrack claimed a Hawker Hurricane fighter shot down. On 16 August, Kaldrack was appointed Gruppenkommandeur of III. Gruppe of ZG 76 after its former commander Hauptmann Friedrich-Karl Dickoré was killed in action. The Gruppe was then ordered to Stavanger-Sola Airfield in October. On 27 January 1941, Kaldrack claimed a RAF Lockheed Hudson light bomber from No. 224 Squadron off the coast of Norway. Hudson N7358 was reported missing over the North Sea, all four members of the crew were killed. On 24 April, III. Gruppe of ZG 76 became II. Gruppe of Schnellkampfgeschwader 210 (SKG 210—210th Fast-Bomber Wing).

=== Operation Barbarossa ===
In preparation of Operation Barbarossa, the German invasion of the Soviet Union in June 1941, SKG 210 was ordered to airfields close to the German-Soviet demarcation line. Here, SKG 210 was attached to II. Fliegerkorps (2nd Air Corps), which was subordinated to Luftflotte 2 (Air Fleet 2), supporting Army Group Centre. Attacking a Soviet airfield at Kozova on 30 June, Kaldrack claimed a Polikarpov I-16 fighter aircraft shot down.

Kaldrack and his aerial gunner Unteroffizier Martin Enke were killed in action on 3 February 1942 south of Toropets during the Toropets–Kholm offensive. Kaldrack flying a Bf 110 E-1 "S9+IC" (Werksnummer 4057), collided with a Mikoyan-Gurevich MiG-1 fighter he had just shot down. Posthumously, he was awarded the German Cross in Gold (Deutsches Kreuz in Gold) on 5 February and the 70th Knight's Cross of the Iron Cross with Oak Leaves (Ritterkreuz des Eisernen Kreuzes mit Eichenlaub), the first Zerstörer pilot to be so honored.

== Summary of career ==
=== Aerial victory claims ===
According to Heaton, Lewis, Olds and Schulze, Kaldrack was credited with 24 aerial victories, including three during the Spanish Civil War. Mathews and Foreman, authors of Luftwaffe Aces — Biographies and Victory Claims, researched the German Federal Archives and state that he was credited with approximately 24 aerial victories. This number includes three claims during the Spanish Civil War, 18 on the Western Front, and eight on the Eastern Front.

=== Awards ===
- Spanish Cross in Gold with Swords (14 April 1939)
- Iron Cross (1939)
  - 2nd Class (19 December 1939)
  - 1st Class (9 June 1940)
- German Cross in Gold on 5 February 1942 (posthumously) as Hauptmann in the II./Schnellkampfgeschwader 210
- Knight's Cross of the Iron Cross with Oak Leaves
  - Knight's Cross on 2 November 1940 as Hauptmann and Gruppenkommandeur of III./Zerstörergeschwader 76
  - 70th Oak Leaves on 9 February 1942 (posthumously) as Hauptmann and Gruppenkommandeur of II./Schnellkampfgeschwader 210
