= Spanish Cross =

Nazi German campaign award

Spanish Cross Spanienkreuz
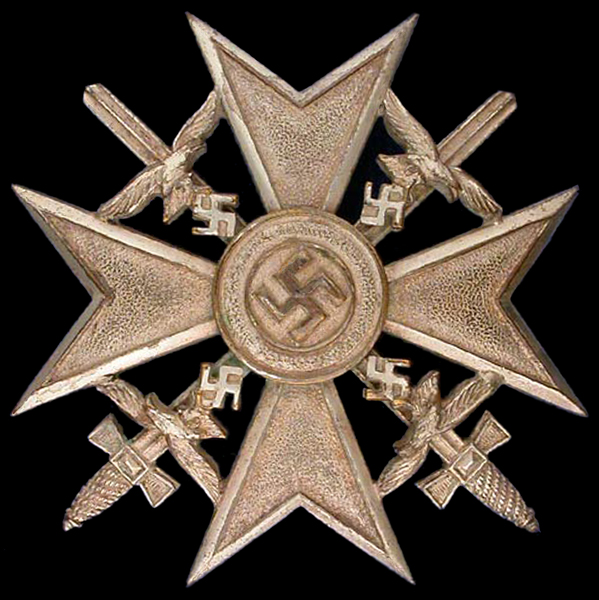
- Spanish Cross in Bronze with Swords
- Type: Badge
- Presented by: Nazi Germany
- Eligibility: Military personnel
- Campaign: Spanish Civil War
- Status: Obsolete
- Established: 14 April 1939

Highlights
- Total: Bronze without Swords – 7,869; Silver without Swords – 327; Bronze with Swords – 8,462; Silver with Swords – 8,304; Gold with Swords – 1,126; Gold with Swords and Diamonds – 28
- Cross for next of kin: ribbon

The Spanish Cross (German: Spanien-Kreuz) was an award of Nazi Germany given to German troops who participated in the Spanish Civil War, fighting on the Nationalist side.

== History ==
With the outbreak of the Spanish Civil War in July 1936, Germany sent the Condor Legion, drawn from the German air force and army, to aid Franco's Nationalist forces. On 14 April 1939, Germany instituted the Spanish Cross as a decoration for the German airmen and soldiers who fought in the Condor Legion during the war. A number of German Navy ships served in Spanish waters, their crew also qualifying for the cross.

The Spanish Cross was to be worn on the right breast below the pocket flap or, if awarded, below the Blood Order. After the death of the recipient, the award remains with the next-of-kin.

The wear of Nazi era awards was banned in 1945. The Spanish Cross was not among those awards reauthorised for official wear by the Federal Republic of Germany in 1957.

== Classes ==
The Spanish Cross filled the dual role of gallantry decoration and campaign medal. The Cross was awarded in Gold, Silver and Bronze classes to reflect the rank or merit of the recipient. The Silver and Bronze classes were awarded with and without swords, the Gold only with swords. For outstanding bravery in combat, the Gold class could be awarded with diamonds.

Each class, and the numbers awarded, were:

=== Bronze ===
The non-combatant version was awarded without swords to military personnel or civilian technicians for three months of service in Spain without combat experience.

7,869 bronze crosses were awarded.

The Spanish Cross in Bronze with Swords version.

==== Bronze with Swords ====
The Spanish Cross in Bronze with Swords was given to individuals involved in front line combat during the war.

8,462 bronze crosses with swords were awarded.

=== Silver ===
The Silver Cross without swords was a non-combatant version awarded for merit.

327 silver crosses were awarded.

==== Silver with Swords ====
The Spanish Cross in Silver was awarded to servicemen who took part in decisive battles or had considerable fighting experience.

8,304 silver crosses with swords were awarded.

=== Gold ===
The Spanish Cross in Gold was awarded, only with swords, to servicemen who showed great merit in combat or exceptional leadership.

1,126 gold crosses were awarded.

==== Gold with Diamonds ====
The Spanish Cross in Gold with Swords and Diamonds was the highest grade of the decoration. It was awarded to those who showed great leadership skills in battle or great merit.

28 gold crosses with diamonds were awarded, one of which was presented to both Werner Mölders and Adolf Galland.

=== Next of Kin ===
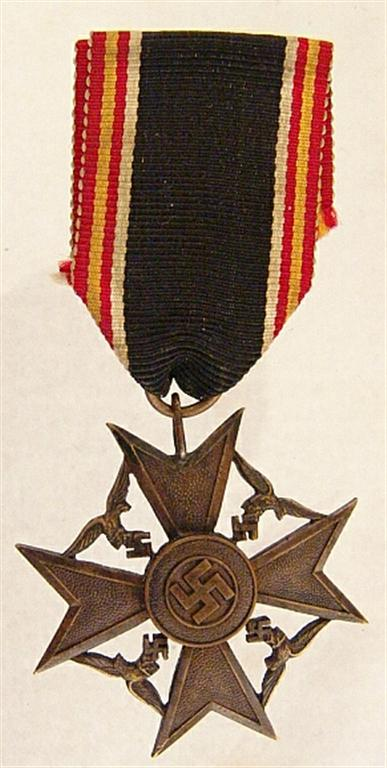
A Spanish Cross for next-of-kin with ribbon.

A Cross of Honour for relatives of the German dead in Spain (German: Ehrenkreuz für hinterbliebene Deutscher Spanienkämpfer) was awarded to relatives of servicemen who died during their service in Spain.

315 next of kin crosses were awarded.

== Design ==
The Spanish Cross is a Maltese cross with, in its centre, a swastika on a roundel. Between each arm of the cross is the Luftwaffe eagle and, for the versions with swords, two crossed swords, placed behind the eagle symbols. The diamond class had brilliants placed around the swastika in the central roundel.

The reverse side is plain and has a pin used for wearing the cross on the uniform.

The cross for next of kin is bronze and similar to the cross without swords, but smaller in size. Unlike the others, it is attached to a ribbon in black with edges in red, yellow, and red (the colours of the flag of spain).

== Recipients ==
- Walter Adolph
- Wilhelm Balthasar*
- Hans-Henning Freiherr von Beust
- Gerhard Bigalk
- Hermann Boehm (admiral)
- Kurt Böhmer
- Hubertus von Bonin
- Eberhard Bopst
- Leopold Bürkner
- Rolf Carls
- Otto Ciliax
- Hans Degen
- Ulrich Diesing
- Oskar Dirlewanger
- Paul Drekmann
- Walter Ehle
- Hans Ehlers
- Diethelm von Eichel-Streiber
- Engelbert Endrass
- Wolfgang Ewald
- Klaus Ewerth
- Fritz Frauenheim
- Hans-Georg von Friedeburg
- Hans von Funck
- Adolf Galland*
- Walter Grabmann
- Karl-Heinz Greisert
- Robert Gysae
- Gotthard Handrick
- Martin Harlinghausen*
- Werner Hartenstein
- Hans Heidtmann
- Werner Henke
- Hajo Herrmann
- Johannes Hintz
- Erich Hippke
- Hermann Hogeback
- Herbert Ihlefeld
- Rolf Johannesson
- Bernhard Jope
- Rolf Kaldrack
- Lothar Keller
- Bernd Klug
- Karl-Heinz Krahl
- Fritz-Julius Lemp
- Wolfgang Lippert (pilot)
- Fritz Losigkeit
- Walther Lucht
- Wolfgang Lüth
- Günther Lützow*
- August Maus
- Hans-Karl Mayer
- Wilhelm Meentzen
- Wilhelm Meisel
- Karl-Friedrich Merten
- Walter Model
- Johann Mohr
- Werner Mölders*
- Heinz Neukirchen
- Eduard Neumann (fighter pilot)
- Walter Oesau*
- Jürgen Oesten
- Adolf Piening
- Rolf Pingel
- Hermann Plocher
- Günther Radusch
- Hermann Rasch
- Hansjürgen Reinicke
- Rudolf Resch
- Wolfram Freiherr von Richthofen*
- Gustav Rödel
- Helmut Rosenbaum
- Jürgen von Rosenstiel
- Wolfgang Schellmann*
- Joachim Schlichting*
- Johann Schmid
- Rudolf Schmidt (Major)
- Herbert Schob
- Georg-Wilhelm Schulz
- Hans Seidemann
- Reinhard Seiler*
- Karl Smidt
- Hugo Sperrle*
- Albert Stecken
- Alois Stoeckl
- Wilhelm Ritter von Thoma*
- Horst Tietzen
- Werner Töniges
- Hannes Trautloft
- Heinrich Trettner
- Joachim Wandel
- Kurt Weyher
- Wolf-Dietrich Wilcke
- Joachim Ziegler
- Felix Zymalkowski

* Won the Spanish Cross in Gold with Swords and Diamonds version
