= Albert Stecken =

German general and Knight's Cross recipient

- Born: 24 January 1915
- Died: 24 August 2011 (aged 96)
- Military career
- Allegiance: Nazi Germany; West Germany
- Branch: Luftwaffe
- Service years: 1935–45; 1956–77
- Rank: Major (Wehrmacht); Generalmajor (Bundeswehr)
- Unit: 8th Parachute Division
- Conflicts: Spanish Civil War; World War II
- Awards: Knight's Cross of the Iron Cross

Albert Stecken (24 January 1915 – 24 August 2011) was an officer in the Fallschirmjäger of Nazi Germany during World War II and a general in the Bundeswehr of West Germany. He was a recipient of the Knight's Cross of the Iron Cross.

== Awards and decorations ==
- Wehrmacht Long Service Award 4th Class (14 February 1939)
- Medalla de la Campaña (4 May 1939)
- Spanish Cruz de Guerra (4 May 1939)
- Spanish Cross in Gold with Swords (6 June 1939)
- Iron Cross (1939) 2nd Class (24 April 1940) & 1st Class (28 June 1940)
- Narvik Shield (30 January 1941)
- Knight's Cross of the Iron Cross on 28 April 1945 as Major im Generalstab and Ia (operations officer) of the 8. Fallschirmjäger-Division
