= Wolfgang Schellmann =

German Spanish Civil War and World War II flying ace

- Wolfgang Schellmann
- Born: 2 March 1911; Kassel
- Died: 22 June 1941 (aged 30) near Grodno, Belarus
- Military career
- Allegiance: Nazi Germany
- Branch: Luftwaffe
- Service years: 1930–1941
- Rank: Oberstleutnant (lieutenant colonel)
- Units: Condor Legion, JG 77
- Commands: JG 2, JG 27
- Conflicts: See battles: Spanish Civil War; World War II Battle of France Battle of Britain Operation Marita Operation Barbarossa †
- Awards: Spanish Cross; Knight's Cross of the Iron Cross

Wolfgang Schellmann (2 March 1911 – 22 June 1941) was a German Luftwaffe military aviator during the Spanish Civil War and World War II. As a fighter ace, he is credited with 25 enemy aircraft shot down, including 12 in Spain, 12 on the Western Front and one on the Eastern Front of World War II.

Born in Kassel, he volunteered for service with the Condor Legion during the Spanish Civil War where he commanded the 1. Staffel (1st squadron) of Jagdgruppe 88 (J/88—88th Fighter Group) and claimed his first aerial victory on 18 January 1938. During World War II, he commanded Jagdgeschwader 2 and Jagdgeschwader 27, and was awarded the Knight's Cross of the Iron Cross on 18 September 1940 during the Battle of Britain. On 22 June 1941, the first day of Operation Barbarossa, Schellmann was posted as missing in action, presumed killed.

== Career ==
Schellmann was born on 2 March 1911 in Kassel, at the time in the Prussian province of Hesse-Nassau in the German Empire. He joined the military service in the Reichswehr of the Weimar Republic in 1930. As one of the few German pilots, he was selected for combat training at the Lipetsk fighter-pilot school in the Soviet Union. In October 1932, Schellmann attended the Military School Dresden. Among his classmates were Werner Mölders, Günther Freiherr von Maltzahn, Joachim Pötter, Hans-Henning Freiherr von Beust, Arved Crüger, Gerhard Kollewe and Hubertus von Bonin.

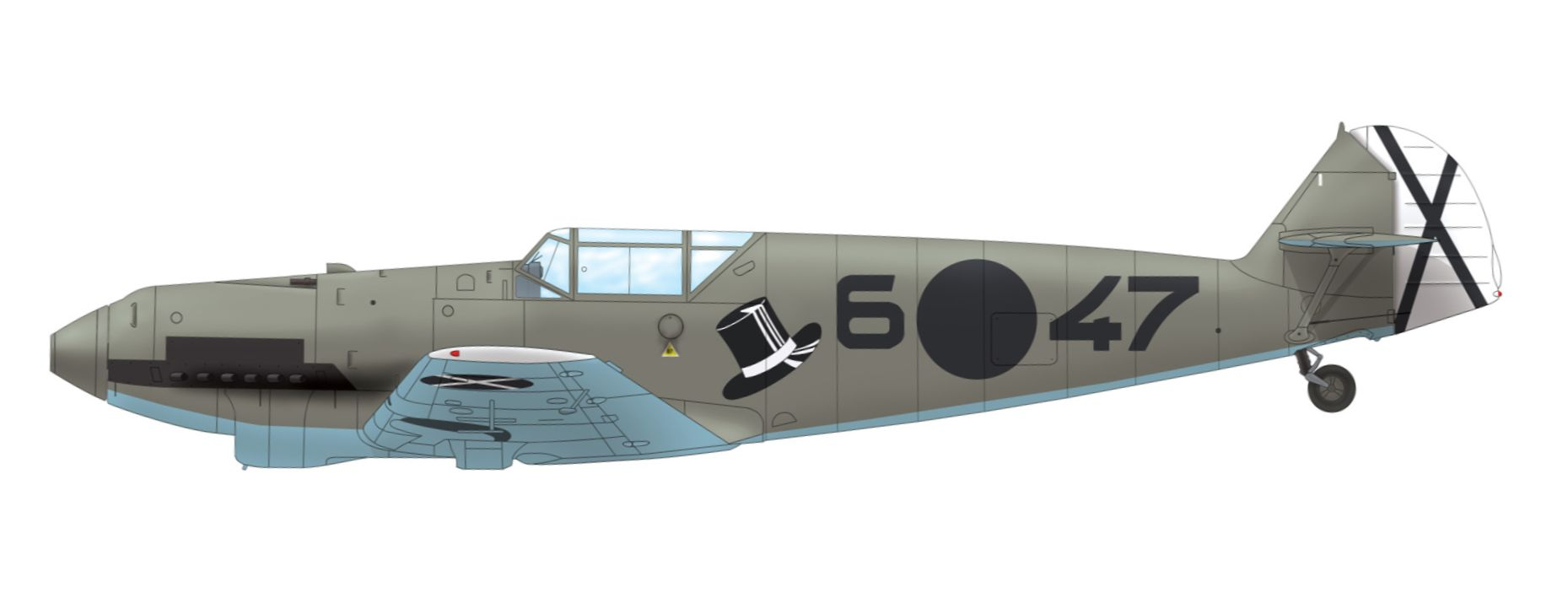
A Bf 109C-1 of 2. Staffel of J/88

On 15 March 1937, Schellmann was appointed Staffelkapitän (squadron leader) of the newly created 2.(leichte) Staffel (2nd light squadron) of Jagdgeschwader 135 (JG 135—135th Fighter Wing). This squadron was subordinated to I. Gruppe (1st group) of JG 135 under the command of Major Max Ibel and was based at Bad Aibling. On 30 November, Schellmann was transferred to the 1. Staffel of Jagdgruppe 88, in the "Condor Legion", fighting in the Spanish Civil War. On 19 December, he succeeded Oberleutnant Harro Harder as the unit's commander. He claimed his first aerial victory on 18 January 1938 when he shot down a Polikarpov I-16 fighter over Teruel. Over the next year, he became one of the leading aces in the theatre with 12 victories, second only to Mölders.

Upon his return to Germany he was awarded the Spanish Cross in Gold with Swords and Diamonds (Spanienkreuz in Gold mit Schwertern und Brillanten) and promoted to Hauptmann (Captain). He then served on the Stab (Headquarters) flight of the newly formed IV. Gruppe of the Jagdgeschwader 132 (JG 132—132nd Fighter Wing). Over the next year, this Gruppe, which was commanded by Hauptmann Johannes Janke, was renamed to I. Gruppe of Jagdgeschwader 331 (JG 331—331st Fighter Wing) on 3 November 1938, before becoming the I. Gruppe of Jagdgeschwader 77 (JG 77—77th Fighter Wing) on 1 May 1939.

== World War II ==
World War II in Europe began on Friday 1 September 1939 when German forces invaded Poland. During the invasion, Schellmann served with the Stab of JG 77 and was then posted to the Stab of Luftflotte 2 (2nd Air Fleet). In October 1939, Schellmann was summoned by Generalleutnant Hubert Weise, at the time commanding general of Luftgau III in Berlin, to the Reichsluftfahrtministerium (RLM—Ministry of Aviation). There, Weise tasked him with the creation of II. Gruppe of Jagdgeschwader 2 "Richthofen" (JG 2—2nd Fighter Wing) at Zerbst. At this meeting, he met Annelise Gaedicke, a secretary in the RLM, whom he married in 1940. Based on the order issued on 11 October, Schellmann was appointed Gruppenkommandeur (group commander) of II. Gruppe of JG 2 on 15 December. The unit was formed from elements of both I. Gruppe of JG 2 and I. Gruppe of Jagdgeschwader 3 (JG 3—3rd Fighter Wing). The Gruppe was officially declared operational on 15 January 1940.

JG 2 insignia

At the start of the Battle of France, II. Gruppe of JG 2 was deployed on the northern sector of Army Group B and had been ordered to an airfield at Hamminkeln on 11 May. Initially subordinated to the IV. Fliegerkorps (4th Air Corps), the Gruppe flew fighter escort missions on the first three days of the campaign for Lehrgeschwader 1 (LG 1—1st Demonstration Wing), Kampfgeschwader 27 (KG 27—27th Bomber Wing) and Sturzkampfgeschwader 3 (StG 3—3rd Dive Bomber Wing) attacking targets in the Netherlands. On 14 May, II. Gruppe was ordered to Peer in Belgium where the Gruppe was placed under the command of the Stab of Jagdgeschwader 26 "Schlageter" (JG 26—26th Fighter Wing). There, II. Gruppe fought against the Royal Air Force (RAF) Advanced Air Striking Force (AASF) and Schellmann was credited with the destruction of a Hawker Hurricane fighter on 15 May. (Note: According to Weal, this claim occurred on 11 May and was II. Gruppe's first aerial victory.) On 17 May, the Gruppe moved to Attenrode and Schellmann claimed a Westland Lysander aircraft shot down southeast of Brussels. Two days later, he shot down another Lysander west of Tournai. Due to the advance of Army Group B, II. Gruppe moved to an airfield at Grandglise. The Gruppe stayed at Grandglise until the end of the Battle of Dunkirk. Fighting in these aerial battles, Schellmann claimed a Supermarine Spitfire fighter shot down near Furnes on 31 May, a Lysander over Dunkirk on 1 June, and another Spitfire over Dunkirk on 2 June. On 3 June, Schellmann and his Gruppe moved to an airfield named Mannessecourt and participated in Operation Paula, the failed attempt to destroy the remaining units of the Armée de l'Air (ALA—French Air Force). That day, Schellmann claimed his last aerial victory of the campaign when he shot down an ALA Morane-Saulnier M.S.406 fighter near Compiègne.

In support of Fall Rot (Case Red), the second phase of the conquest of France, II. Gruppe was subordinated to the Stab of JG 2 and ordered to Monceau-le-Waast on 4 June. On 5 June, together with the other elements of JG 2, II. Gruppe fought over the combat area of the 6th and 9th Army. In contrast to the other groups of JG 2, II. Gruppe pilots claimed just one aerial victory on 6 June and another on 13 June. As German ground forces advanced towards the Aisne, the Gruppe faced less aerial opposition resulting in more ground support missions flown. Following the Armistice of 22 June 1940, combat operation concluded on 25 June. On 27 June, II. Gruppe was ordered to Beaumont-le-Roger, patrolling the English Channel and participated in the occupation of Guernsey on 1 July. Schellmann claimed his first aerial victory during the Battle of Britain on 18 July when he shot down a Bristol Blenheim bomber north of Le Havre. On Adlertag, 13 August, he led II. Gruppe on a fighter sweep, clearing the airspace for the Luftwaffe bombers. Flying with the Geschwaderstab on 25 and 27 August, Schellmann claimed a Spitfire shot down near Warmwell and another Spitfire near Wareham. On 31 August, he shot down a Hurricane near Eastchurch also flying the Geschwaderstab. At the time, Schellmann was already considered to become the next Geschwaderkommodore (wing commander) of JG 2.

=== Wing commander ===
In late August it was becoming apparent to the Oberkommando der Wehrmacht (German High Command) that the Battle of Britain was not going as planned. The frustrated Commander-in-Chief of the Luftwaffe, Hermann Göring, relieved several Geschwaderkommodore of their commands, and appointed younger, more aggressive men in their place. In consequence, on 2 September, Schellmann was given command of JG 2 thus succeeding Oberstleutnant Harry von Bülow-Bothkamp who was transferred. Command of II. Gruppe was passed to Hauptmann Karl-Heinz Greisert. On 18 September, he was awarded the Knight's Cross of the Iron Cross (Ritterkreuz des Eisernen Kreuzes) for his 23 victories, including the 12 in Spain. The decoration was presented by Göring at the Dutch headquarters of General der Flieger (General of the Aviators) Friedrich Christiansen at Wassenaar near The Hague on 19 September. Schellmann claimed his only aerial victory as Geschwaderkommodore of JG 2 on 26 September 1940 when he shot down a Spitfire fighter near the Isle of Wight.

JG 27 insignia

On 22 October, he was replaced by Major Helmut Wick as commander of JG 2 and transferred to take command of Jagdgeschwader 27 (JG 27—27th Fighter Wing). He replaced Major Bernhard Woldenga who had temporarily assumed command after Oberstleutnant Ibel had been transferred on 10 October. At the time of his transfer to JG 27, the Geschwader was based at Guînes at the English Channel and was subordinated to the II. Fliegerkorps (2nd Air Corps). On 10 November, JG 27 was withdrawn from Channel operations. The Geschwader was then ordered to Detmold for a period of replenishment and equipment overhaul. On 2 January 1941, the Geschwaderstab was moved to Wiener-Neustadt and then to Bucharest-Băneasa on 26 January. In preparation for Operation Marita, the Geschwaderstab and III. Gruppe of JG 27 transferred to Belitsa on 14 March. German forces invaded Greece on 6 April. Following the German advance, JG 27 moved to Ptolemaida on 16 April and to Larissa on 20 April. That day, Schellmann claimed a Hurricane fighter shot down near Tanagra. On 30 April, JG 27 was then ordered to Eleusis where the Geschwaderstab was given a brief period of rest before being relocated to Suwałki on 4 June in preparation of Operation Barbarossa, the German invasion of the Soviet Union. At the start of the invasion, JG 27 was subordinated to VIII. Fliegerkorps (8th Air Corps) and was deployed in the northern sector of Army Group Centre.

On 22 June 1941, Schellmann was probably the highest profile German casualty of the opening day of Operation Barbarossa. Schellmann shot down a I-16 fighter and then collided with the I-16 near Grodno in his Messerschmitt Bf 109 E-7 (Werknummer 4189—factory number). According to Trigg, Schellmann was rammed by an Polikarpov I-153 piloted by Lieutenant Kuzmin. Kuzmin was killed in the collision but Schellmann managed to bail out over Soviet territory but was never seen again. In this account, he attempted to make his way back to German lines, was captured and later killed by NKVD troops. Major Woldenga then again assumed command of JG 27.

== Summary of career ==
=== Aerial victory claims ===
According to US historian David T. Zabecki, Schellmann was credited with 25 aerial victories, 12 of which during the Spanish Civil War. Mathews and Foreman, authors of Luftwaffe Aces — Biographies and Victory Claims, researched the German Federal Archives and found documentation for 26 aerial victory claims. This number includes 12 claims during the Spanish Civil War, 11 over the Western Allies, and one on the Eastern Front.

Chronicle of aerial victories
This and the ? (question mark) indicates information discrepancies listed by Prien, Stemmer, Rodeike, Bock, Mathews and Foreman.
Claim	Date	Time	Type	Location	Claim	Date	Time	Type	Location
– 1. Staffel of Jagdgruppe 88 – Spanish Civil War
1	18 January 1938	—	I-16		7	20 July 1938	—	I-16	
2	8 March 1938	—	I-15		8	20 July 1938	—	I-16	
3	24 March 1938	—	I-15		9	12 August 1938	—	SB-2	
4	13 June 1938	—	I-16		10	12 August 1938	—	SB-2	
5	25 June 1938	—	I-16		11	14 August 1938	—	I-16	
6	18 July 1938	—	I-16		12	20 August 1938	—	I-16	
– Stab II. Gruppe of Jagdgeschwader 2 "Richthofen" – Battle of France — 10 May – 25 June 1940
13	15 May 1940	09:35? (Note: According to Mathews and Foreman claimed at 09:55.)	Hurricane	Couly	17	1 June 1940	05:45	Lysander	Dunkirk
14	17 May 1940	08:35	Lysander	southeast of Brussels	18	2 June 1940	09:45	Spitfire	Dunkirk
15	19 May 1940	06:05	Lysander	west of Tournai	19	3 June 1940	14:45	M.S.406	Compiègne
16	31 May 1940	15:55	Spitfire	Furnes					
– Stab II. Gruppe of Jagdgeschwader 2 "Richthofen" – At the Channel and over England — 26 June – 2 September 1940
20	18 July 1940	13:15	Blenheim	north of Le Havre					
– Stab of Jagdgeschwader 2 "Richthofen" – At the Channel and over England — 22 June – 20 October 1940
21	25 August 1940	18:30	Spitfire	Warmwell	23	31 August 1940	09:25	Hurricane	Eastchurch
22	27 August 1940	—	Spitfire	Wareham	24	26 September 1940	17:40	Spitfire	Isle of Wight
– Stab of Jagdgeschwader 27 – During the Balkan Campaign — 12 November 1940 – 13 May 1941
25	20 April 1941	12:10	Hurricane	Tanagra					
– Stab of Jagdgeschwader 27 – Operation Barbarossa — 22 June 1941
25	22 June 1941	03:15	I-16	Grodno					

=== Awards ===
- Spanish Cross in Gold with Swords and Diamonds (14 April 1939)
- Knight's Cross of the Iron Cross on 18 September 1940 as Major and Geschwaderkommodore of Jagdgeschwader 2 "Richthofen"

== See also ==
- List of people who disappeared

== Notes ==
Military offices
Preceded by Oberleutant Harro Harder	Squadron Leader of 1.J/88; 19 December 1937 – early September 1938	Succeeded by Hauptmann Siebelt Reents
Preceded by none: new unit	Group Commander of II./JG 2; 15 December 1939 – 20 August 1940	Succeeded by Hauptmann Karl-Heinz Greisert
Preceded by Oberstleutnant Harry von Bülow-Bothkamp	Commander of Jagdgeschwader 2 "Richthofen"; 3 September 1940 – 19 October 1940	Succeeded by Major Helmut Wick
Preceded by Major Bernhard Woldenga	Commander of Jagdgeschwader 27; 22 October 1940 – 21 June 1941	Succeeded by Major Bernhard Woldenga
