= Wilhelm Balthasar =

German World War II flying ace (1914–1941)

- Balthasar as a Hauptmann
- Born: 2 February 1914; Fulda, Grand Duchy of Hesse, German Empire
- Died: 3 July 1941 (aged 27) between Saint-Omer and Aire-sur-la-Lys, German-occupied France
- Cause of death: Killed in action
- Burial place: German war cemetery at Illies, France
- Military career
- Allegiance: Nazi Germany
- Branch: Luftwaffe
- Service years: 1933–1941
- Rank: Major (major)
- Units: Condor Legion; JG 1, JG 27, JG 3, JG 2
- Commands: JG 2
- Conflicts: See battles Spanish Civil War World War II: Invasion of Poland; Battle of France; Battle of Britain †
- Awards: Spanish Cross in Gold with Swords and Diamonds; Knight's Cross of the Iron Cross with Oak Leaves

Wilhelm Balthasar (2 February 1914 – 3 July 1941) was a German Luftwaffe military aviator and wing commander during World War II. As a fighter ace, he is credited with seven aerial victories during the Spanish Civil War and further 40 aerial victories on the Western Front of World War II. He flew about 300 combat missions during World War II in addition to 465 in Spain.

Born in Fulda, Balthasar grew up in the Weimar Republic. Following graduation from school, he volunteered for military service in the Reichswehr in 1933. Initially serving with the Army, he transferred to the Luftwaffe in 1935. During the Spanish Civil War, he volunteered for service in the Condor Legion. In Spain, he claimed his first aerial victory on 20 January 1937. For his service in Spain, he was decorated with the Spanish Cross in Gold with Swords and Diamonds. During World War II, Balthasar claimed his first victory on 11 May 1940 during the Battle of France. Balthasar emerged as Germany's leading fighter pilot of the Battle of France and was awarded the Knight's Cross of the Iron Cross on 14 June 1940.

In September 1940, Balthasar was given command of III. Gruppe (3rd group) of Jagdgeschwader 3 (JG 3–3rd Fighter Wing) which was fighting in the Battle of Britain. In February 1941, he was appointed Geschwaderkommodore (wing commander) of Jagdgeschwader 2 "Richthofen" (JG 2–2nd Fighter Wing) and claimed his 40th aerial victory during World War II on 27 June. For this achievement he was awarded the Knight's Cross of the Iron Cross with Oak Leaves, the highest award in the military and paramilitary forces of Nazi Germany during World War II, on 2 July 1941. (Note: Until late September 1941, the Knight's Cross of the Iron Cross with Oak Leaves was second only to the Grand Cross of the Iron Cross (Großkreuz des Eisernen Kreuzes), which was awarded only to senior commanders for winning a major battle or campaign, in the military order of Nazi Germany. The Knight's Cross of the Iron Cross with Oak Leaves as highest military order was officially surpassed on 28 September 1941 by the Knight's Cross of the Iron Cross with Oak Leaves and Swords (Ritterkreuz des Eisernen Kreuzes mit Eichenlaub und Schwertern), however the first presentation of the Swords to Adolf Galland was made prior to this date on 21 June 1941.) The next day, Balthasar was killed in action near Saint-Omer, France.

== Early life ==
Balthasar was born on 2 February 1914 in Fulda, Hesse-Kassel. He was the son of forester August Balthasar who on 25 October 1914 was killed in action as a Hauptmann on the Western Front of World War I. In 1933, Balthasar joined the Reichswehr with Artillerie Regiment 3, an artillery regiment of the 3rd Division. In 1935, he transferred to the Luftwaffe and was promoted to Leutnant (second lieutenant) on 20 April 1935. In November 1936, he volunteered to join Sonderstab W, named after its commander General Helmuth Wilberg, for deployment in the Spanish Civil War.

== Legion Condor ==
Following his arrival in Spain in mid-October 1936, Balthasar served with Kampfgruppe K/88 and Aufklärungsgruppe A/88 flying bomber and reconnaissance missions in Junkers Ju 52 and Heinkel He 70. On 16 March, he made a forced landing at Almorox following combat damage sustained by his He 70. Balthasar was also involved in the testing of the Heinkel He 112 V4 under combat conditions. On 20 January 1937, he was credited with his first aerial victory when he shot down a Spanish Republican Air Force Polikarpov I-16 on 20 January 1937. During the Battle of Alfambra, Balthasar claimed four Tupolev SB bombers shot down.

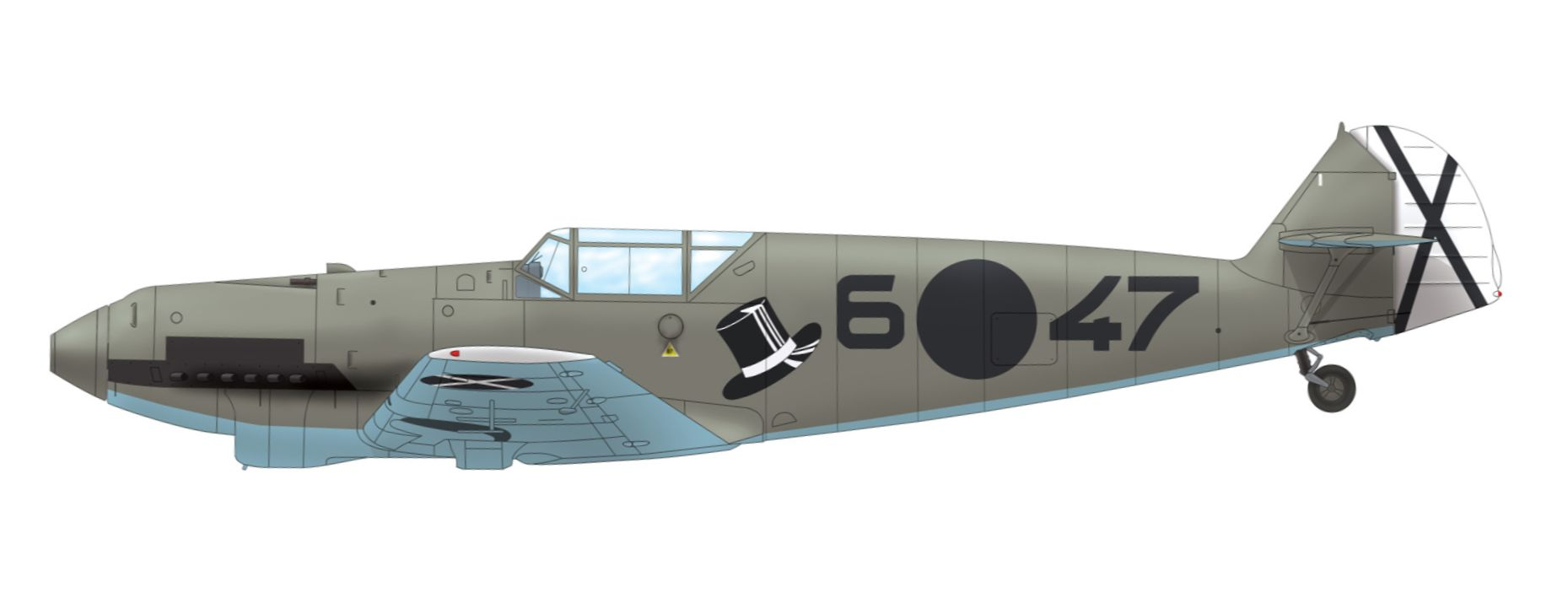
A Bf 109C-1 of 2. Staffel of J/88

Balthasar flew 465 missions in Spain and returned to Germany on 23 March 1938. For his service in Spain, he was awarded the Spanish Cross in Gold with Swords and Diamonds (Spanienkreuz in Gold mit Schwertern und Brillanten). He then served at the Jagdfliegerschule (fighter pilot school) in Werneuchen. On 1 August 1938, Balthasar was appointed Staffelkapitän (squadron leader) of 1. Staffel (1st squadron) of Jagdgeschwader 131 (JG 131–131st Fighter Wing), this unit became 1. Staffel of Jagdgeschwader 130 (JG 130–130th Fighter Wing) on 1 November and was again renamed on 1 May 1939 and was referred to 1. Staffel of Jagdgeschwader 1 (JG 1–1st Fighter Wing) from then on.

In early 1939, Balthasar, together with Rolf Kaldrack and Anhäuser, flew a Siebel Fh 104 Hallore twin-engined transport aircraft on one of the longest flights to Africa, covering 40,000 kilometers (25,000 miles). In mid-August 1939, 1. Staffel of JG 1 was ordered to move from Jesau, near present-day Bagrationovsk, to Schippenbeil, present-day Sępopol, in preparation for the German Invasion of Poland.

== World War II ==
World War II in Europe began on Friday 1 September 1939 when German forces invaded Poland. On 6 September, I. Gruppe (1st group) of JG 1, to which 1. Staffel was subordinated, was withdrawn and ordered to Lübeck-Blankensee and then on 15 September to Vörden where the unit stayed until January 1940. There, the Gruppe flew fighter protection during the "Phoney War" on the German border to the Netherlands. On 23 September 1939, Balthasar received the Iron Cross 2nd Class (Eisernes Kreuz zweiter Klasse). (Note: According to Thomas on 20 September 1939.) He was promoted to Hauptmann (captain) on 1 December 1939. In January 1940, I. Gruppe moved to Plantlünne and on 11 March to Gymnich, patrolling the area Düren–Aachen–Cologne.

=== Battle of France ===
On 10 May 1940, German forces launched the Battle of France. During this campaign, I. Gruppe of JG 1 was subordinated to the Stab (headquarters unit) of Jagdgeschwader 27 (JG 27–27th Fighter Wing). That day, I. Gruppe flew combat air patrols in the area of Venlo–Tirlemont–Liège and later that day to Maastricht. The following day, Balthasar claimed three Belgian Air Force Gloster Gladiator fighters and a French Air Force Morane-Saulnier M.S.406 fighter in the combat area of Maastricht. Four Belgian Air Force Gladiators from 1/I/2 (1st Squadron, 1st Group, 2nd Wing) were shot down by 1./JG 1 on 13 May while flying a fighter escort mission for Belgian bombers, although the Germans claimed seven, only six were sent on the mission. Three badly damaged Belgian Battles of the 5/III/3 from the nine dispatched returned. Two Fairey Foxes were also claimed on this date by the pilots. On 13 May Balthasar claimed a Hurricane from No. 87 Squadron RAF, who claimed one of the Bf 109s—neither side reported on losses.

On 19 May the RAF Advanced Air Striking Force utilised the Westland Lysander liaison aircraft as a bomber as the situation in the air was now desperate for the Belgians, French and British. Balthasar claimed one near Amiens. Two aircraft from No. 26 Squadron RAF are known to have been lost on this date. Flight Lieutenant Ian Gleed, 87 Squadron, observed the Bf 109 attack that shot down the Lysanders and engaged the enemy. Gleed and his pilots made several victory claims. 2(J)/LG 2 and II./JG 26 were involved in this combat. Later that day, the British recorded the loss of two Lysanders from a formation of six sent up by No. 16 Squadron RAF—one source suggests this was the one claimed by Balthasar. One of the crews force-landed unhurt, but the other crew were killed.

On 23 May he claimed three Hawker Hurricane fighters near Douai. RAF Fighter Command lost six in total this day over France—one 32 Squadron aircraft near Arras to 109s with pilot Sergeant GL Nowell wounded. 242 lost four on an escort mission; Flying Officer JW Graafstra and Pilot Officer GA Malone were killed in action with Bf 109s, Pilot Officer J Benzie was wounded and JB Smiley was captured. 253 Squadron pilot DJ Ford survived and 605 Squadron Flight Lieutenant PG Leeson was taken prisoner. Three days later, on the final day of the Siege of Calais, Balthasar claimed two Spitfires over the port. Six Spitfires were shot down after combat with Bf 109s this day; No. 19 Squadron RAF lost three destroyed and two damaged; Squadron leader GD Stephenson was captured and sent to Colidtz prison, Pilot Officer PV Wilson died of wounds on 28 May, Sergeant CA Irwin was killed, Pilot Officer MD Lyne and Flying Officer GE Ball were wounded. Pilot Officer KG Hart from 65 Squadron force-landed and Pilot Officer JL Allen DFC, was rescued after parachuting into the English Channel.

On 5 June, Balthasar became an "ace-in-a-day", claiming two Lioré et Olivier LeO 45 medium bombers, a Potez 63 bomber a two M.S.406 fighters shot down. The next day, he claimed four further victories, three LeO 451s and a M.S.406, which brought his World War II tally to 21. For this achievement, on 14 June 1940, Balthasar was awarded the Knight's Cross of the Iron Cross (Ritterkreuz des Eisernen Kreuzes), becoming the second Luftwaffe fighter pilot after Werner Mölders, to be so decorated. With 23 aerial victories, Balthasar was the most successful German fighter pilot of the Battle of France. (Note: At the time, Werner Mölders was credited with 25 aerial victories, two more than Balthasar. However, of Mölders 25 victories, nine of which had been claimed during the "Phoney War".)

=== Group commander ===
On 1 September 1940, Balthasar was appointed Gruppenkommandeur (group commander) of III. Gruppe of Jagdgeschwader 3 (JG 3–3rd Fighter Wing), replacing Hauptmann Walter Kienitz during the Battle of Britain. On 4 September, Balthasar led III. Gruppe on a fighter escort mission for German bombers targeting Canterbury. Over Canterbury, he claimed a Supermarine Spitfire fighter destroyed, probably from No. 222 Squadron but was himself wounded in the leg. Despite the injury, he managed to fly back to Desvres. Two Spirifres from 222 Squadron were destroyed by enemy fire. Flying Officer OJW Cutts was killed over Maidstone at approximately 13:30 and Sergeant JW Ramshaw crashed in the same area.

Although his leg was not yet fully healed, Balthasar led his Gruppe again from the air on 23 September. That day the target area was southeast England. III. Gruppe claimed three aerial victories, including two Spitfires by Balthasar, for the loss of two of their own. 92 Squadron suffered one damaged in a crash landing near Gravesend at 10:00 with pilot Pilot Officer AJS Pattinson was wounded; P3971 was repaired. At approximately 10:30 Pilot Officer BW Brown of 72 Squadron bailed out after combat with 109s in the same area. Spitfire II, P7362 disappeared at approximately 11:30 to an unknown cause, 26-year-old Sergeant DH Ayres' body was recovered from the water off Southwald on 4 October. A number of Hurricane fighters were also lost. P2960, from 257 Squadron was lost in combat with 109s at approximately 09:50 over the Thames Estuary and pilot Sereant DJ Austin was wounded. 73 Squadron suffered the loss of four at approximately 10:55, near Faversham and over or near the Isle of Sheppey. All four pilots parachuted to safety but three were wounded; one rescued from the water with burns. One 229 Squadron Hurricane was lost over the Hoo Peninsula at 10:50. Pilot Officer POD Allcock was wounded—the incident was caused by an attack by enemy fighters. Balthasar claimed a Sptifire north of Cap Gris-Nez that same day. No. 234 Squadron RAF lost Spitfire I, R6896. Flying Officer TM Kane became a prisoner of war and was sent to Stalag Luft III.

He claimed another Spitfire on 27 September. That day, the Luftwaffe targeted London and lost 19 Bf 109s, 19 Bf 110s and 17 Ju 88s. RAF Fighter Command lost 18 Spitfires destroyed or damaged to all causes in the days air battles. Balthasar claimed his last aerial victories with JG 3 on 29 October. On the second mission of the day targeting Kent, Balthasar claimed two Spritfires shot down. In November 1940, Balthasar had to be submitted to a hospital as his injury sustained on 4 September had still not fully healed.

In 1940, Balthasar married Lore Drohn. The marriage produced their son Wolff Balthasar born on 10 April 1941.

=== Wing commander and death ===
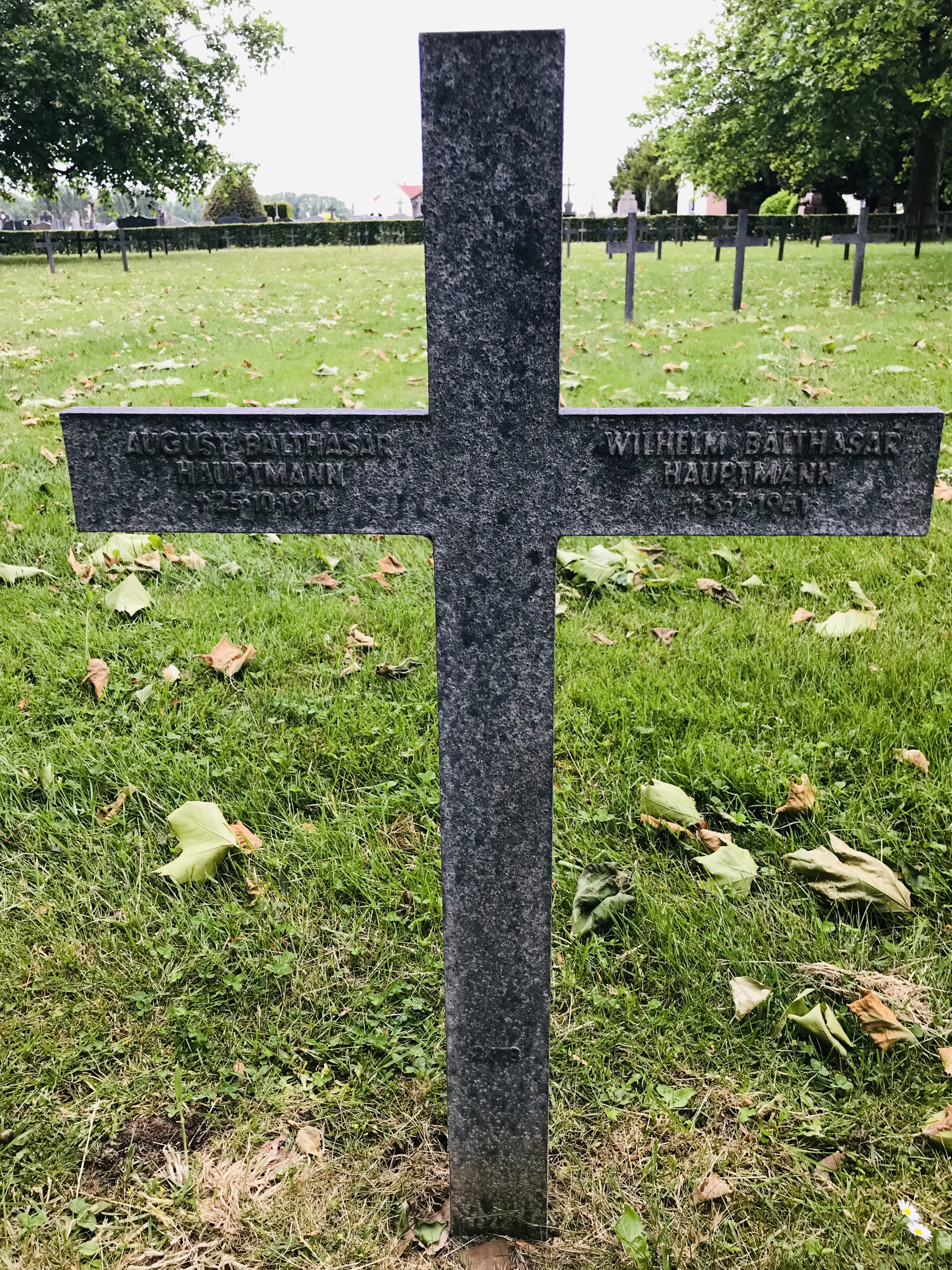
August and Wilhelm Balthasar's grave at the German War Cemetery Illies

On 16 February 1941, Balthasar was appointed Geschwaderkommodore (wing commander) of Jagdgeschwader 2 "Richthofen" (JG 2–2nd Fighter Wing), named after the World War I fighter ace Manfred von Richthofen. Balthasar thus succeeded Hauptmann Karl-Heinz Greisert who had assumed temporary command of JG 2 following the death of Helmut Wick on 28 November 1940. Command of III. Gruppe of JG 3 was passed to Hauptmann Walter Oesau. Between 22 and 27 June 1941, he claimed another nine Royal Air Force (RAF) aircraft, including two Bristol Blenheim bombers on 22 and 23 June each, which brought his victory total to 40. For this milestone, he was awarded Knight's Cross of the Iron Cross with Oak Leaves (Ritterkreuz des Eisernen Kreuzes mit Eichenlaub) on 2 July 1941. He was the 17th member of the German armed forces to be so honored.

The next day, Balthasar was killed in action in his Bf 109 F-4 (Werknummer 7066—factory number) near the road from Aire to Saint-Omer at 15:25 hours. His victor may have been Squadron Leader Michael Lister-Robinson from No. 609 Squadron. Other RAF pilots observed and reported that one of the Bf 109's wings had come off. Lister-Robinson reported a wing came off after he used his cannon against a Messerschmitt. It is also possible that Wing Commander Harry Broadhurst could have made a head-on attack on his Messerschmitt, receiving severe punishment himself and crash-landing his Spitfire at Hornchurch. Balthasar was posthumously promoted to the rank of Major and buried at a World War I cemetery in Flanders alongside his father at Illies. His former Gymnasium, the Freiherr-vom-Stein-Schule, an advanced secondary school in Fulda, was named the Wilhelm-Balthasar-Schule in 1942 and carried this name until the end of World War II.

== Summary of career ==
=== Aerial victory claims ===
According to US historian David T. Zabecki, Balthasar was credited with 40 aerial victories, five of which during the Spanish Civil War. Mathews and Foreman, authors of Luftwaffe Aces — Biographies and Victory Claims, researched the German Federal Archives and found records for more than 45 aerial victory claims, plus one further unconfirmed claim. This number includes 6 claims during the Spanish Civil War and 38 on the Western Front of World War II.

Chronicle of aerial victories
This and the ♠ (Ace of spades) indicates those aerial victories which made Balthasar an "ace-in-a-day", a term which designates a fighter pilot who has shot down five or more airplanes in a single day. This and the ? (question mark) indicates information discrepancies listed by Prien, Stemmer, Rodeike, Bock, Forsyth, Mathews and Foreman.
Claim	Date	Time	Type	Location	Claim	Date	Time	Type	Location
Spanish Civil War
– 1. Staffel of Jagdgruppe 88 – Spanish Civil War — January 1937 – January 1938
1? (Note: According to Forsyth this claim is unconfirmed.)	20 January 1937	—	I-16		2	20 January 1938	—	I-16	
– 2. Staffel of Jagdgruppe 88 – Spanish Civil War — February 1938
3	7 February 1938	—	SB-2		5	7 February 1938	—	SB-2	
4	7 February 1938	—	SB-2		6	7 February 1938	—	SB-2	
World War II
– 1. Staffel of Jagdgeschwader 1 – Battle of France — 10 May – 25 June 1940
1	11 May 1940	06:55	Gladiator	vicinity of Maastricht	13♠	5 June 1940	10:40	LeO 451	Montdidier
2? (Note: According to Mathews and Foreman, Balthasar claimed a Morane-Saulnier M.S.406 which was unconfirmed.)	11 May 1940	—	Gladiator?	vicinity of Maastricht	14♠	5 June 1940	10:48	Potez 63	Nesle
3	11 May 1940	06:58	Gladiator	vicinity of Maastricht	15♠	5 June 1940	10:50	LeO 451	Nesle
4	11 May 1940	19:51	M.S.406	west of Maastricht	16♠	5 June 1940	21:20	M.S.406	Roye
5	13 May 1940	06:15	Hurricane	Jodoigne	17♠	5 June 1940	21:30	M.S.406	Roye
6	17 May 1940	13:55	Hawk 75	Compiègne	18	6 June 1940	16:40	M.S.406	Roye
7	19 May 1940	13:50	Lysander	Amiens	19	6 June 1940	16:50	LeO 451	Roye
8	23 May 1940	14:10	Hurricane	Douai	20	6 June 1940	16:55? (Note: According to Mathews and Foreman claimed at 16:35.)	LeO 451	Roye
9	23 May 1940	14:20	Hurricane	Douai	21	6 June 1940	17:05	LeO 451	Ham
10	23 May 1940	14:40	Hurricane	Douai	? (Note: According to Mathews and Foreman, on 12 March 1943 Bühlingen shot down a Bloch MB.151 fighter for his 26th aerial victory, including six claims during the Spanish Civil War. However, Prien, Stemmer, Rodeike and Bock do not list this claim.)	13 June 1940	13:25	MB.151	Provins
11? (Note: This claim is not listed by Mathews and Foreman.)	26 May 1940	—	Spitfire	vicinity of Calais	22	13 June 1940	17:50	Potez 63	Provins
12	26 May 1940	10:03	Spitfire	vicinity of Calais	23	13 June 1940	18:20	Blenheim	Sézanne
– Stab III. Gruppe of Jagdgeschwader 3 – At the Channel and over England — 26 June 1940 – 9 June 1941
24	4 September 1940	11:00	Spitfire	southeast of London	27	27 September 1940	14:25	Spitfire	
25	23 September 1940	11:06	Spitfire	south of Chatham	28	29 October 1940	16:40	Spitfire	
26	23 September 1940	11:20	Spitfire	north of Cap Gris-Nez	29	29 October 1940	16:45	Spitfire	
– Stab of Jagdgeschwader 2 – At the Channel and over England — 16 February – 21 June 1941
30	17 May 1941	18:55	Spitfire	Strait of Dover	31	19 May 1941	20:20	Blenheim	south of the Isle of Wight
– Stab of Jagdgeschwader 2 – At the Channel and over England — 22 June – 3 July 1941
32	22 June 1941	16:00	Blenheim	Saint-Omer/Gravelines	37	25 June 1941	13:00	Spitfire	Hazebrouck/Gravelines
33	22 June 1941	16:02	Blenheim	Saint-Omer/Gravelines	38	25 June 1941	16:45	Spitfire	Saint-Omer/Boulogne
34	23 June 1941	20:33? (Note: According to Mathews and Foreman claimed at 20:30.)	Blenheim	10 km (6.2 mi) north of Dunkirk	39	27 June 1941	22:03	Spitfire	Lille/Gravelines
35	23 June 1941	20:33	Blenheim	10 km (6.2 mi) north of Dunkirk	40	27 June 1941	22:07	Blenheim	Lille/Gravelines
36	24 June 1941	20:50	Spitfire	Gravelines/Ramsgate					

=== Awards ===
- Spanish Cross in Gold with Swords and Diamonds (20 June 1939)
- Iron Cross (1939)
  - 2nd Class (20 September 1939)
  - 1st Class
- Knight's Cross of the Iron Cross with Oak Leaves
  - Knight's Cross on 14 June 1940 as Hauptmann and Staffelkapitän of the 7./Jagdgeschwader 27 (Note: According to Scherzer as Staffelkapitän of the 1./Jagdgeschwader 1)
  - 17th Oak Leaves on 2 July 1941 as Hauptmann and Geschwaderkommodore of Jagdgeschwader 2 "Richthofen"

=== Promotions ===
20 April 1935:	Leutnant (Second Lieutenant)
18 January 1938:	Oberleutnant (First Lieutenant)
1 December 1939:	Hauptmann (Captain)
posthumously in 1941:	Major (Major)

== Notes ==
Military offices
Preceded by Hauptmann Karl-Heinz Greisert	Commander of Jagdgeschwader 2 "Richthofen"; 16 February 1941 – 3 July 1941	Succeeded by Oberstleutnant Walter Oesau
