= Almorox =

Coordinates: 40°14′N 4°23′W

- municipality
- Coat of arms
- Interactive map of Almorox
- Country: Spain
- Autonomous community: Castile-La Mancha
- Province: Toledo
- Municipality: Almorox

Area
  - Total: 65 km^{2} (25 sq mi)
- Elevation: 533 m (1,749 ft)

Population (2025-01-01)
  - Total: 2,569
  - Density: 40/km^{2} (100/sq mi)
- Time zone: UTC+1 (CET)
  - Summer (DST): UTC+2 (CEST)
- Website: http://www.almorox.es

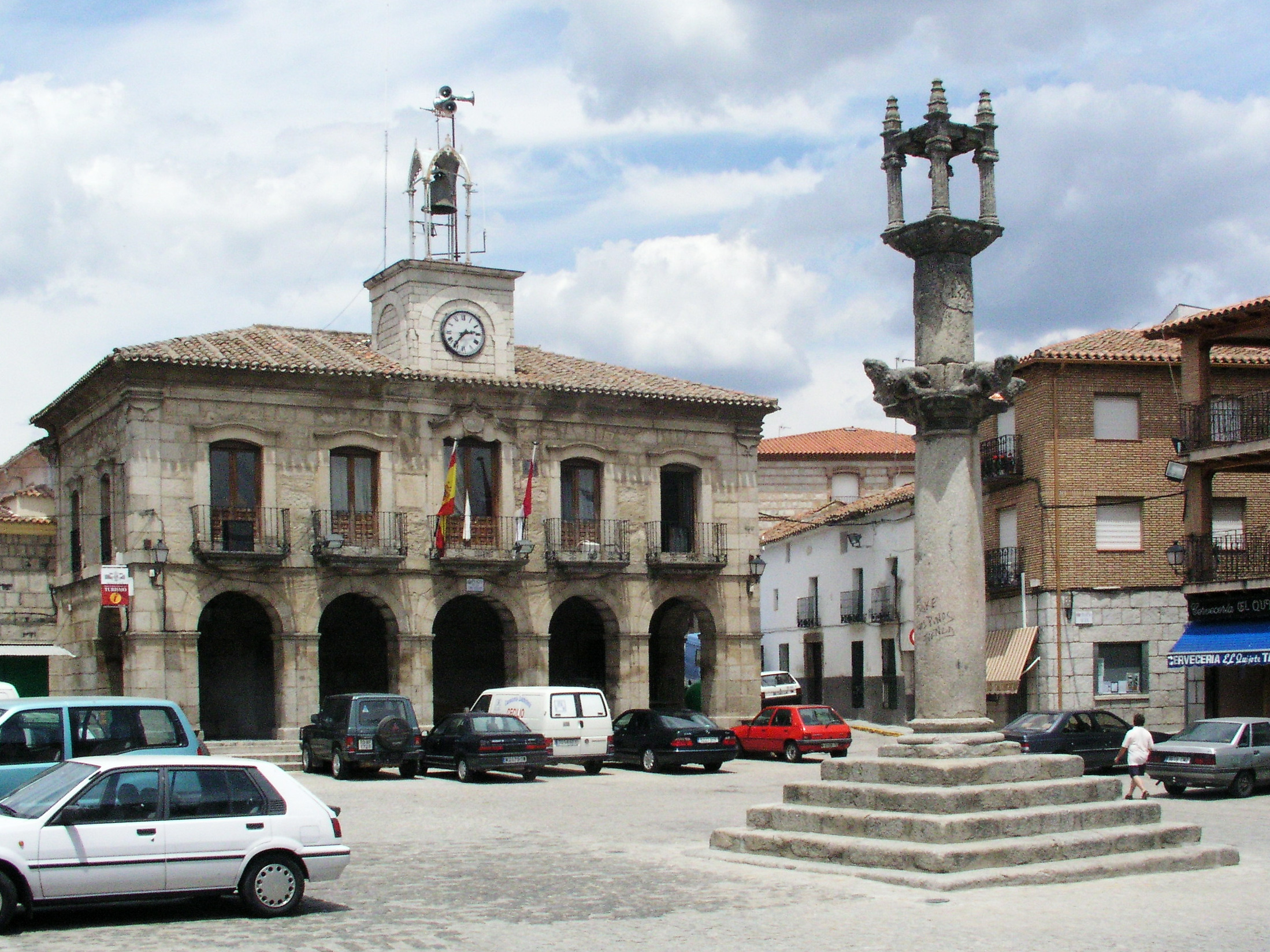
Almorox Local Council

Almorox is a municipality located in the province of Toledo, Castile-La Mancha, Spain.

According to the 2006 census (INE), the municipality had a population of 2371 inhabitants.

== History ==
The church of San Cristóbal dates from the 16th century.

At the end of the 19th century a railway was constructed from Madrid which terminated at Almorox. It was originally intended to extend the line, but trains stopped running to Almorox in 1966.

== Demographics ==
Historical population
Year	Pop.	±%
1900	2,422	—
1910	2,750	+13.5%
1920	2,809	+2.1%
1930	2,864	+2.0%
1940	2,678	−6.5%
1950	2,660	−0.7%
1960	2,644	−0.6%
1970	2,146	−18.8%
1981	2,169	+1.1%
1991	2,117	−2.4%
2001	2,171	+2.6%
2011	2,469	+13.7%
2021	2,318	−6.1%
2023	2,396	+3.4%
Source: INE
