= Jagdgruppe 88 =

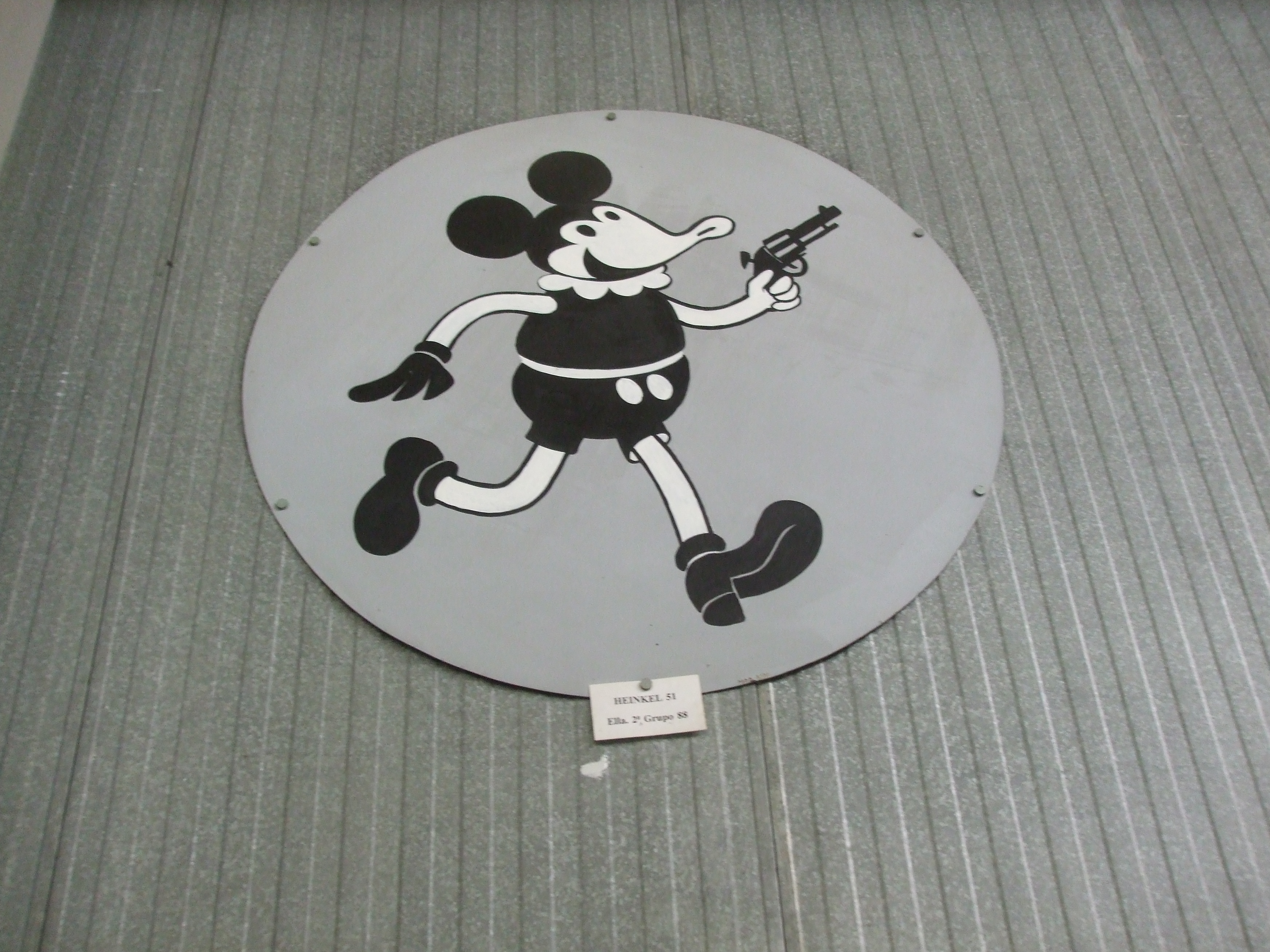
- "Mickey Mouse" badge of 3rd squadron of Jagdgruppe 88
- Active: November 1936 – June 1939
- Country: Nazi Germany; Francoist Spain
- Branch: Condor Legion
- Type: Fighter Aircraft
- Role: Air superiority
- Engagements: Spanish Civil War

Commanders
- Notable commanders: Haupmann Gotthard Handrick

Insignia
- Identification symbol

Jagdgruppe 88 (J/88) was a German Condor Legion fighter group serving in the Spanish Civil War. J/88 consisted of a headquarters (Stab) and four squadrons (Staffeln), although the 4th Staffel was short-lived. J/88 had formed on 3 November 1936.

== Formation ==
The Condor Legion was an expeditionary force of soldiers and airmen sent to aid the Spanish Nationalist group during the Spanish Civil War. The Germans used the war as an opportunity to evaluate new equipment, guns, vehicles and aircraft, and to develop tactical techniques which were later used in the 1939-45 conflict.

In addition to a detachment of converted Junkers Ju 52s, an initial cadre of six Heinkel He-51s, were despatched, with enough service staff to instruct the Spanish aircrews in the operation and maintenance of the aircraft. Under the leadership of Leutnant Hannes Trautloft J/88 arrived by sea in August 1936. While the Spanish Air Force pilots trained, Trautloft and the other pilots became the first of an eventual 326 aircrew who would serve with Jagdgruppe 88 during the next two and a half years.

== Operational history ==
On 25 August 1936, Oberleutnant Eberhardt Kraft and Oberleutnant Hannes Trautloft each claimed a Republican Bréguet 19 light bomber, one of which was the unit's first claim in Spain. Meantime aid from the Soviet Union arrived for the Republican forces. The supplied Soviet fighters (Polikarpov I-15 and I-16) easily outperformed the Heinkel He 51s, and in late 1936, three Messerschmitt Bf 109 prototypes were sent to J/88, and soon followed by the first 15 of the latest Bf 109As. A He 112 V6 prototype was also sent. Armed with a single 20 mm cannon firing through the airscrew hub, the Kanonenvogel (cannon bird) was to be evaluated as a ground attack aircraft and assigned to Jagdgruppe 88 at Almorox in March. Over the next few months the He 112 V6 was flown by several pilots, but on 19 July 1937, with Unteroffizier Max Schulze flying, the engine seized during landing, and the He 112 V6 broke its back and was written off.

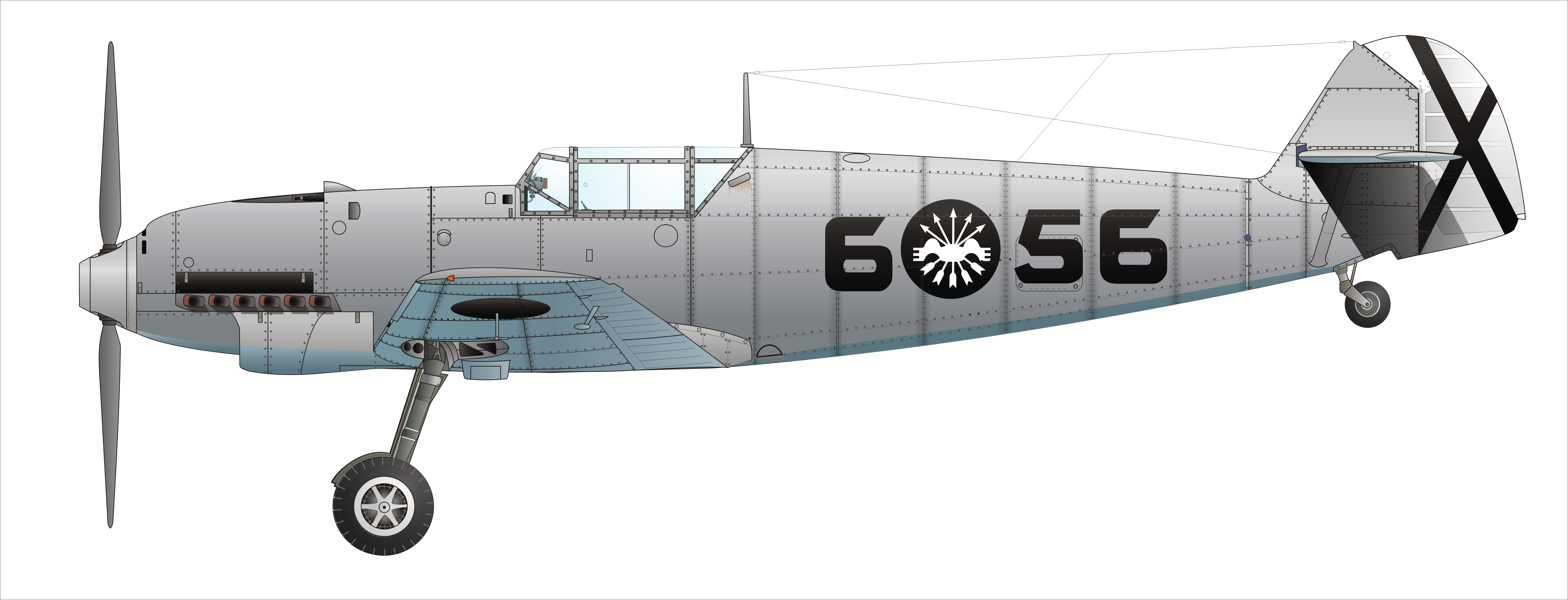
Messerschmitt Bf 109 C-1, Jagdgruppe 88, Legion Condor

The first unit to fly the Bf 109 was 2. Staffel, commanded by Oberleutnant Günther Lützow. The unit initially suffered several landing accidents, until the pilots became familiar with taking off and landing on the narrow‑track undercarriage.

The first major action of 2.J/88 with the Bf 109, took place during the Battle of Brunete in July 1937. Based near Ávila, its main mission was to escort the Junkers Ju 52 bombers. The Bf 109s, utilising superior tactics developed by Leutnant Werner Mölders, turned air superiority in favour of the Condor Legion. The Bf 109s drew first blood on 8 July 1937 when Leutnant Rolf Pingel and Uzz. Guido Höness claimed two Tupolev SB‑2 bombers. Air combats fought on 12 July resulted in two Aero A.101s claimed by Höness, an SB‑2 to Pingel, and three I‑16s by Pingel, Fw. Peter Boddem and Fw. Adolf Buhl. Höness became the first Bf 109 loss, probably shot down and killed by a Republican I-16 flown by American Frank Tinker. The Condor Legion lost eight aircraft, but J/88 fighters claimed 18 victories.

On 24 July Republican forces launched their final major offensive, the Battle of the Ebro. Reconnaissance aircraft of the Condor Legion noticed the troop build-up, and while the Republic forced gained ground, they failed to take Gandesa, due to intensive ( over 400) sorties by 70 Legion aircraft. The rest of the battle saw a series of air strikes, followed by a Nationalist counter-offensive. During the 113-day battle, only 10 aircraft were lost and 14 damaged; the Legion claimed 100 Republican aircraft destroyed, a third of those lost. Only 5 aircrew had been killed, and 6 captured.

Some 19 Bf 109C-1s, with a fuel‑injected Jumo 210G engine and four 7.92 mm machine guns, arrived in Spain in the spring 1938, followed by nine Bf 109Ds in August. In February 1939 the latest Bf 109E‑1 model was sent to Jagdgruppe 88, with 2. Staffel converting from early Bf 109 in late February 1939, just prior to the end of the War. The unit then took part in operations against the remnants of the Republican Air Force through early 1939, with considerable success. The men of J/88 returned to Germany in May 1939.

365 aircraft were claimed destroyed by Jagdgruppe 88, and 26 pilots claimed 5 kills or more. Werner Mölders (14), Wolfgang Schellmann (12), Harro Harder (11) and Peter Boddem (10) were top scorers.

== Prominent members of J/88 ==
Hauptmann Gotthard Handrick, winner of the modern pentathlon at the 1936 Berlin Olympics, arrived in the summer of 1937 to assume command of Jagdgruppe 88, remaining until September 1938, during which time he had claimed 5 victories.

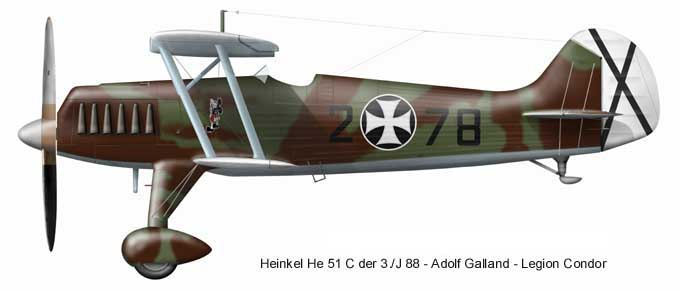
Heinkel He 51 C of the 3./J 88 — Adolf Galland — Legion Condor

Oberleutnant Werner Mölders arrived on 14 April 1938, and took over from Adolf Galland commanding 3. Staffel. During the conflict he showed considerable qualities as both a pilot and tactician. He helped to develop the "finger four", formation, which improved a combat flight's all-round effectiveness, vision and flexibility in combat. Between July and November 1938 he shot down fourteen aircraft: eleven I-16s, two Polikarpov I-15s and one SB-2, mostly flying a Bf 109C-1 coded 6-79 "Luchs".

Leutnant Wilhelm Balthasar joined Jagdgruppe 88 in September 1937, and gained six victories, including four Tupolev SB-2 bombers shot down in one mission on 7 February 1938.

Oberleutnant Adolf Galland was appointed Staffelkapitän of 3. Staffel, in July 1937, eventually flying 200 ground attack missions in the Heinkel He 51.

== Commanding officers ==
- Hauptmann Hubertus Merhardt von Bernegg, November 1936 – July 1937
- Hauptmann Gotthard Handrick, 18 July 1937 – 10 September 1938
- Hauptmann Walter Grabmann, 9 September 1938 – 31 March 1939

=== 1. Staffel ===
- Hauptmann Werner Palm, November 1936 – 6 April 1937
- Oberleutnant Harro Harder, April 1937 – 18 December 1937
- Oberleutnant Wolfgang Schellmann, December 1937 – 2 September 1938
- Hauptmann Siebelt Reents, September 1938 – June 1939

=== 2. Staffel ===
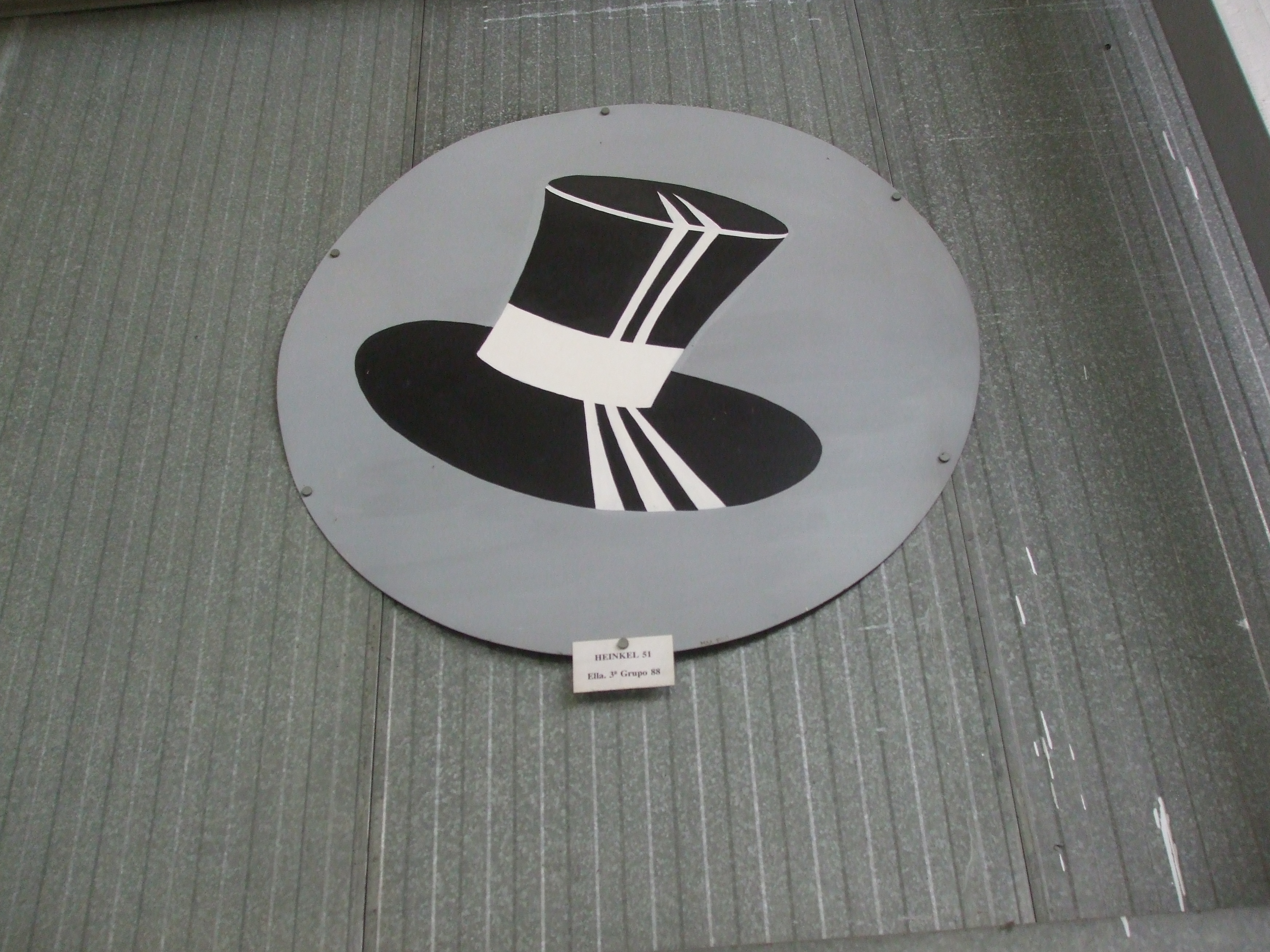
2. Staffel Insignia

- Oberleutnant Siegfried Lehmann, November 1936 – 19 March 1937
- Oberleutnant Günther Lützow, March 1937 – September 1937
- Oberleutnant Joachim Schlichting, September 1937 – 28 May 1938
- Oberleutnant Hubert Kroeck, May 1938 – 31 October 1938
- Oberleutnant Alfred von Lojewski, November 1938 – June 1939

=== 3. Staffel ===
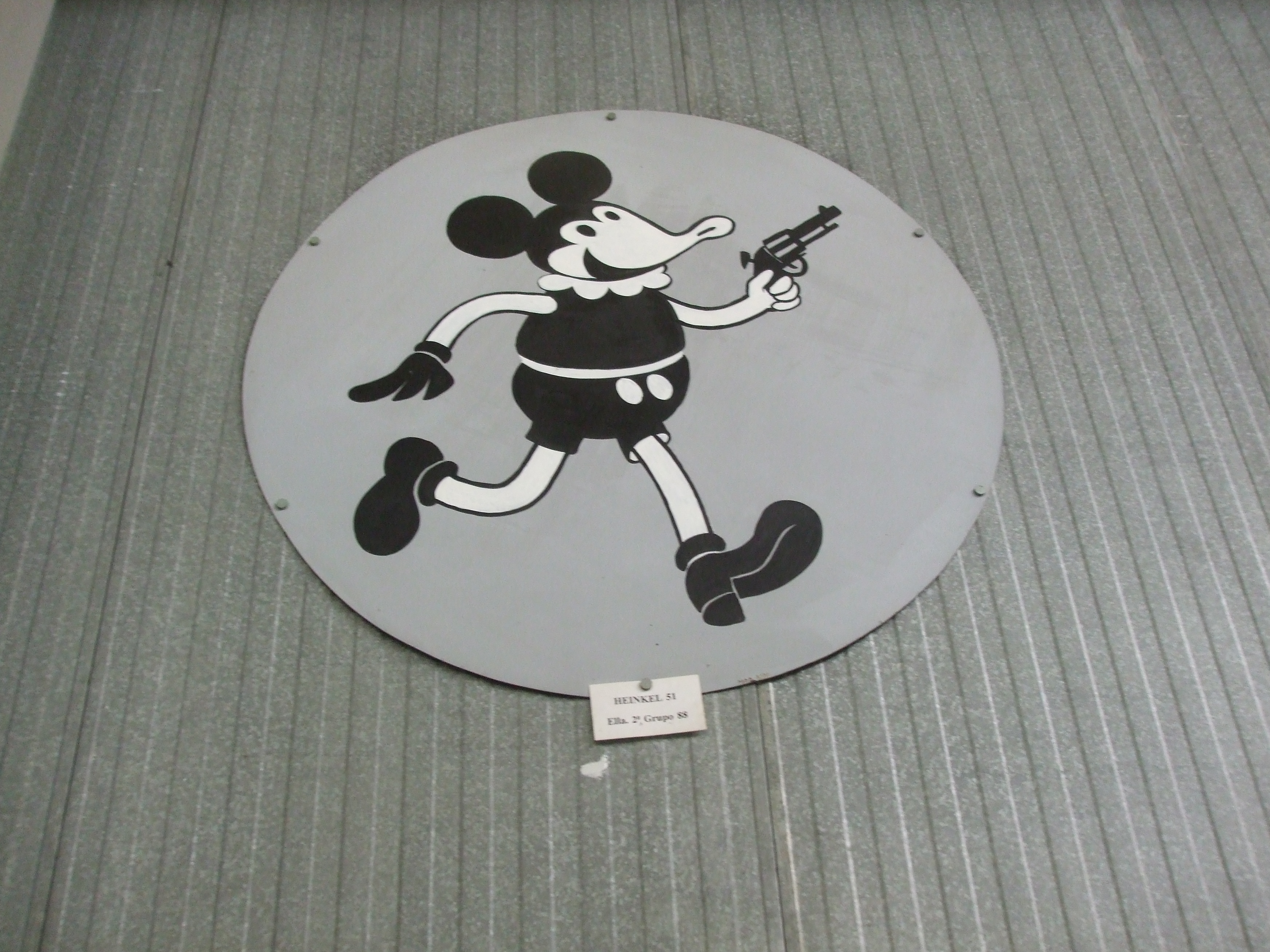
3. Staffel Insignia

- Oberleutnant Jürgen Roth, November 1936 – 19 March 1937
- Oberleutnant Douglas Pitcairn, March 1937 – 27 July 1937
- Oberleutnant Adolf Galland, July 1937 – 24 May 1938
- Oberleutnant Werner Mölders, 24 May 1938 – 5 December 1938
- Oberleutnant Hubertus von Bonin, 5 December 1938 – June 1939
