= Operational history of the Luftwaffe (1939–1945) =

During the Second World War the German Luftwaffe was the main support weapon of the German Army (Heer). It fought and supported the Wehrmacht's war effort throughout the six years of conflict and contributed to much of Nazi Germany's early successes in 1939–1942. After the turn in Germany's fortunes, it continued to support the German ground forces until the German surrender in May 1945.

== Invasion of Poland ==
On 1 September 1939 German forces invaded Poland, triggering World War II. The Luftwaffe begun the invasion by bombing the undefended town of Wieluń. The Luftwaffe was an instrumental component of the Blitzkrieg battle plan. The Luftwaffe assigned two airfleets to the campaign. Albert Kesselring's Luftflotte 1 was equipped with 807 aircraft, which was augmented by 92 Seaplanes of Fliegerfuhrer der Seeluftstreitkrafte. Alexander Löhr's Luftflotte 4 had 627 aircraft, augmented by 30 Slovak aircraft. A further 406 fighters were retained as part of home defence against potential Polish attack, while another 333 reconnaissance aircraft, under the command of Kommandeur der Luftwaffe, were attached to the army.

The Junkers Ju 87 Stuka dive bombers carried out the first mission of the campaign, twenty minutes before war was officially announced. The dive bombers scored the first aerial victory of the war when Kettenführer Leutnant Frank Neubert shot down a Polish PZL P.11c fighter aircraft piloted by Captain Mieczysław Medwecki.

The Polish Air Force was defeated in just over two weeks. The Poles had distributed their operational planes to satellite airfields, so what was left on the airfields was unserviceable aircraft which were then destroyed by the Luftwaffe which is where the incorrect statement that the Polish Air Force was destroyed on the ground originated from.

The Polish bomber units did attempt to strike at the German Panzer (armoured) divisions and slow the speed of advance. Units equipped with PZL.37 Łoś bomber were destroyed within days. The Messerschmitt Bf 110 was proving itself to be more than capable in both the escort and bomber intercept role and accounted for the majority of these victories, which pleased Hermann Göring, a fan of the twin-engined heavy fighter.

The Polish fighter units were still active, and were inflicting small losses on the Luftwaffe, however the Jagd and Zerstörergruppen were increasing their ground attack roles. As a result, many Polish fighters were caught taking off, when they were at a considerable disadvantage. It was indirect rather than direct air support which won the Luftwaffe air-superiority. By destroying communications the Luftwaffe increased the pace of the advance which overran Polish airstrips and early warning sites and caused logistical problems for the Polish forces. Many Polish Air Force units were by then low on supplies, 98 of their number withdrew into neutral (at that time) Romania. Their initial strength of 397 had been reduced to just 54 by 14 September and air opposition virtually ceased.

Part of the Luftwaffe's operations involved the destruction of the small but modern Polish Navy. The Luftwaffe had few units capable of effective anti-shipping operations. One of these units was 4.(St)/TrGr 186 – a Stuka unit which originally had been trained to operate from the German aircraft carrier Graf Zeppelin. 4.(St)/TrGr 186's most notable success was to sink the destroyer Wicher and mine-layer Gryf.

The Luftwaffe had been successful in neutralizing Polish air and sea power within first days of campaign, and with air superiority established the Luftwaffe was free to concentrate on attacking supply and communication links with devastating effect. The outdated Polish Army was denied what mobility it had left as traveling by road became perilous and the rail networks had been largely destroyed.

The Stuka became the symbol of the German war machine throughout the campaign. Operating without opposition, it supported the Panzer divisions by acting as flying artillery. On one occasion six Polish divisions trapped by encircling German forces were forced to surrender after a relentless four-day assault by StG 51, StG 76 and StG 77. Employed in this assault was the 50 kg fragmentation bombs which caused appalling damage to enemy ground troops. Demoralized, the Poles surrendered.

The Wehrmacht however was given a shock soon afterwards. The Polish 'Poznan' and 'Pomorze' armies counter-attacked, threatening to break the flank of the German 8. Armee, and to cut off the 10.Armee. The Luftwaffe was called upon for a maximum effort in what became known as the Battle of Bzura. The Luftwaffe's offensive broke what remained of Polish resistance in an "awesome demonstration of air power". The Luftwaffe quickly destroyed the bridges across the Bzura river. Afterward the Polish forces were trapped out in the open, and were attacked by wave after wave of Stukas, dropping 50 kg 'light bombs' which caused huge numbers of casualties. The Polish flak positions ran out of ammunition and they retreated to the forests but were then 'smoked out' by the Heinkel He 111s and Dornier Do 17s dropping 100 kg incendiaries. The Luftwaffe had left the Army with the simple task of mopping up survivors. The Sturzkampfgeschwader alone dropped 388 tonnes of bombs during this battle.

The expenditure of munitions was beyond expectations. The Luftwaffe had expended a third of their explosives (some 3,000 tonnes). The Luftwaffe's aircraft had performed well. The Dornier Do 17 and Heinkel He 111 were faster than the Polish fighters and were able to outrun them. Many losses occurred through anti-aircraft fire. According to a Luftwaffe General Quartermaster report as of 28 September 1939 German forces lost 285 aircraft to all causes, while 279 aircraft were damaged at 10% or above and were written off or required major repairs. Aircrew losses were 189 dead, 126 wounded and 224 missing.

Polish resistance ended completely on 6 October 1939.

== Norway and Denmark ==
Operation Weserübung (9 April–10 June 1940)

The Luftwaffe had assembled 527 aircraft for the campaign in Scandinavia, including 300 medium bombers and 50 Stuka dive-bombers. The Germans had also deployed over 40 seaplane reconnaissance aircraft and 200 Junkers Ju 52 transports to carry occupying forces and Fallschirmjäger paratroops. The opposing air forces of Denmark and Norway were poorly equipped. The Danes had only 89 combat aircraft (and only 12 of the relatively modern Fokker D XXI) and the Norwegians a strength of 74.

Operation Weserübung commenced on the morning of 9 April 1940. The only hostile engagement the Luftwaffe took part in over Denmark was on the first day of the invasion, when a flight of Bf 110s of 1./ZG 1 (Zerstörergeschwader 1) shot down one Fokker CV taking off on a reconnaissance mission from Vaerlose airfield. The remaining machines were either destroyed or severely damaged by ground strafing. Denmark was virtually overrun within 24 hours and capitulated. The surviving Danish aircraft were first impounded and later on in the war confiscated and used for training purposes by the Luftwaffe. During the invasion a significant incident occurred in the town of Aalborg, when Oberleutnant Victor Mölders (brother of Werner Mölders) took the official surrender of the town after landing at the local airfield. Dressed in flying gear he was given a lift into the town center by a milkman to find suitable quarters for I./ZG 1's Bf 110 crews.

The German invasion of Norway also began that day, and although inferior in the air, the Norwegians put up considerable resistance. Norwegian air strength around Oslo consisted of just 24 combat aircraft including five Tiger Moth biplanes; this force was destroyed or captured by the evening. After the first day's fighting Norwegian aerial strength fell to 54.

A notable failure of the Luftwaffe during the initial invasion was caused by the Stukas of Sturzkampfgeschwader I./StG 1, who failed to silence the batteries of the Oscarsborg Fortress thus contributing to the loss of the heavy cruiser Blücher and causing the disruption of the amphibious landings in Oslo through Oslofjord.

The Luftwaffe incurred considerable losses over Oslo's Fornebu airport in which Norwegian Gloster Gladiators shot down a transport aircraft in exchange for a single loss. The airport continued to be held by the Norwegians and several Ju 52s were forced to land under fire causing considerable losses to the transports. Helmut Lent, a future night fighter ace, destroyed two Gladiators and then proceeded to strafe the defenders. The Bf 110s were running out of fuel and the situation was becoming critical, until more Ju 52s approached and disgorged the airborne troops which then quickly secured the airfield.

With Luftwaffe support, the Wehrmacht had established a toe-hold in Norway. The Germans had flown 680 sorties and had lost 43 aircraft destroyed or damaged. In the next few days the Luftwaffe would establish air-superiority. The British RAF Fighter Command, RAF Bomber Command and Fleet Air Arm continued to support the Allied forces, but suffered heavy losses at the hands of the Luftwaffe.

The Luftwaffe had also dented the Royal Navy during the first phases of the invasion. Junkers Ju 88's of KG 30 and Heinkel He 111s of KG 26 succeeded in damaging the battleship HMS Rodney and sinking the destroyer HMS Gurkha. Focke-Wulf Fw 200 'Condors' were used to patrol the coast and report shipping positions to the Luftwaffe Kampfgruppen and U-boats in the area. Southern Norway was effectively in German hands by 20 April but the fighting in northern and central Norway lasted for some weeks. The Norwegian campaign lasted until June 1940, and with the disasters suffered by the Allies in France, British and French Forces withdrew and Norway capitulated.

The campaign had cost the Luftwaffe 260 aircraft, of which 86 were transports. Personnel casualties numbered 342 killed and 448 missing. It had destroyed 96 British aircraft (43 in air-to-air combat) and sunk a cruiser, six destroyers, 21 other warships of other sorts and 21 merchant ships. Luftwaffe transport losses, while heavy, helped supply the Army with fuel and supplies in 3,018 missions over the course of the battle. The Luftwaffe had no doubt tipped the balance of the campaign in Germany's favour, without it the Allied advantage on land and at sea might have defeated the invasion. During the remainder of the year the Luftwaffe would meet increasing numbers of British made Hawker Hurricane and Supermarine Spitfire aircraft which were much faster than the Luftwaffe's bomber fleet; the future campaigns, though successful, were to prove far more costly.

== Invasion of France and the Low Countries ==
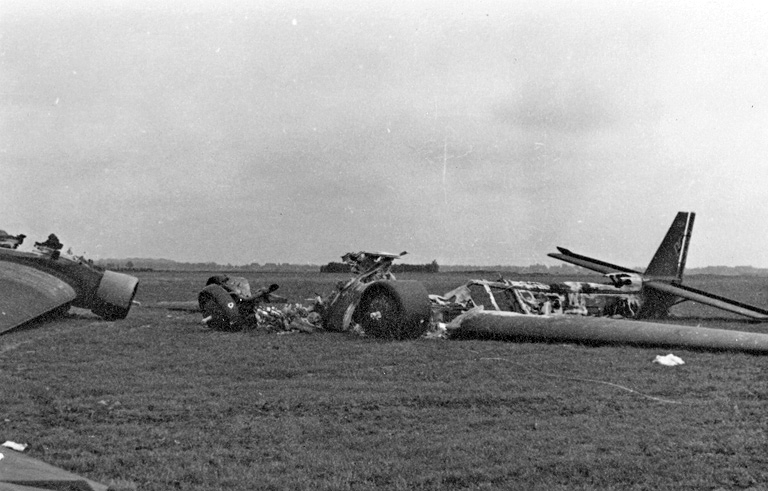
A burned out German Junkers Ju 52 transport lying in a Dutch field. 50 percent of the Luftwaffe's Transportgruppen was destroyed during the assault

On 10 May 1940, the Wehrmacht launched the invasion of France and the Low Countries. The first phase of the invasion Fall Gelb called for an invasion of the Netherlands and Belgium in which the Germans correctly predicted the French and British Forces would then push into Belgium to stop advances into France. Gelb would then deliver the main blow, as most of the German armoured divisions would strike through the Ardennes and cut off the Allied forces in northern France, leaving the rest of the country defenseless.

The Polish campaign had taught the Luftwaffe valuable lessons. It was no longer thought that it could wipe out the French and British air power immediately on the ground, although Albert Kesselring (Commander of Luftlotte 3) hoped this would be achieved against the Dutch and the Belgians. The French Armée de l'air had 1,562 aircraft, and initial RAF Fighter Command's strength stood at 680 machines, while Bomber Command could contribute some 392 aircraft to operations.

The Luftwaffe only attacked a handful of airfields in France during the first day of the campaign, as most effort was diverted to ground support operations. In the Netherlands the Luftwaffe made extensive use of paratroopers and glider-borne forces (eventually to little effect). The Luftwaffe had committed a force of 1,815 combat, 487 Transport and 50 glider aircraft for the invasion of the Low countries.

The opposing air forces of Belgium (the Aéronautique militaire – AeMI) and the Netherlands (the Militaire Luchtvaart – ML) were far inferior in terms of equipment and numbers, the Dutch Airforce largely used biplanes. The ML had only 144 aircraft but, like the Polish, they were dispersed well. After the first days operations half the ML's strength had been sapped. During the four days that it resisted the Luftwaffe it accounted for only a handful of Luftwaffe aircraft shot down.

The difficulties facing the Luftwaffe during the Norwegian campaign resurfaced in the Netherlands. The Hague airfields were to be captured by glider and paratroops, but the Dutch had heavily fortified the area and prepared obstacles to hamper landing attempts. Much of the ground was also soft causing many transports to sink into the grass making them very vulnerable to enemy artillery fire. The RAF was quickly deployed to the Netherlands to offer support for the ML. Together with Dutch AA, it inflicted heavy losses on the Transportgruppen, 125 Ju 52 in all, were destroyed and 47 damaged, representing 50% of the fleet's strength.

On 14 May, the Dutch began negotiations for a ceasefire. On this 14 May the city of Rotterdam was bombed by the Luftwaffe. The Dutch officially surrendered on 15 May. Some Dutch forces continued to resist in Zeeland to enable French and British forces to evacuate.

The Luftwaffe had far better success in Belgium. Having completed thorough photographic reconnaissance missions it destroyed 83 of the 179 aircraft the Aéronautique militaire within the first 24 hours. The Belgian air force flew 77 operational missions but contributed little to the air campaign. The Luftwaffe was assured air superiority over the Low Countries.

The Belgian fortress of Eben Emael was taken on the 10 May. This successful action was carried out by glider troops in DFS 230 gliders, consisting of 85 paratroopers of the 1st Fallschirmjäger Division led by Oberleutnant Rudolf Witzig. Reinforced by the German 151st Infantry Regiment, and on 11 May 1,200 Belgian soldiers in the fortress surrendered. Despite RAF and French assistance, Belgium surrendered on 28 May. In the first nine days of the Campaign Armée de l'air losses exceeded those of the other Allied air forces, losing 420 aircraft to all causes. The RAF would lose 203, including 128 on the ground.

During the Blitzkrieg operations of Fall Gelb and Fall Rot, as in Poland, it was the Stuka that stood out. The Stukas took a heavy toll of Allied Naval and Ground forces. Its ability to deliver accurate payloads with pinpoint precision along with its psychological screaming sirens became the scourge of the Allies. Although lightly armed, slow and unmaneuverable the Luftwaffe had established virtual air superiority and Stukas were to operate without much opposition. Regarded as 'flying artillery' the Stukas responded to Panzer Divisions calls by clearing up pockets of resistance along the axis of advance. The Stukas operated virtually at the limits of their range, until the introduction of the Ju 87R which provided extended range. Over 120 Stukas were destroyed or damaged during the campaign (mostly to ground fire), which represented nearly one-third of the Stuka-arms strength.

Allied attempts to stem the advance in the wake of the Battle of Dunkirk (see also Evacuation of Dunkirk) by bombing the advancing German forces failed with heavy losses. On 14 May 1940, a day the Luftwaffe called "the day of the fighters", Allied bombers attempted to halt the Wehrmacht crossing the Meuse river, but inadequately protected they suffered appalling losses at the hands of Luftwaffe fighters. Over 120 Bf 109s destroyed as many French and British aircraft (90 of which were bombers) in the day's fighting.

As early on as 16 May, the French position on the ground and in the air was becoming desperate. They pressed the British for to commit more of the RAF fighter groups to the battle. Hugh Dowding, C-in-C of RAF Fighter Command refused, arguing that if France collapsed, the British fighter force would be severely weakened.

The most significant operational failure of the Luftwaffe during these campaigns was the inability to prevent the embarkation of most of the British Expeditionary Force in May–June 1940. Although it can be argued that Hitler ultimately was responsible, fearing the Panzer divisions' losses would deplete them ahead of the southward drive into France and recalling how in 1914 the waterways in north-eastern France had bogged down the German northern flank he prevented the push which would have netted him the entire Allied land forces on the continent. During the Dunkirk battle the Luftwaffe flew 1,882 bombing and 1,997 fighter sweeps. German losses over Dunkirk represented just 2% of their losses during the campaign, less than 100 aircraft. British losses totaled 6% of their total losses during the French campaign, including 60 precious fighter pilots.

The second, and final, phase of the German plan was Fall Rot. The Luftwaffe supported the rapidly advancing army into southern France by initiating several offensives such as Operation Paula. Opposition in the air, significant at first, died away. The Armée de l'air was now largely absent from French skies. Nearly 1,000 of its aircraft were destroyed and captured on airfields around Paris after the fall of the city on 14 June.

At the beginning of Fall Rot, French aviation industry had reached a considerable output, and estimated its strength at nearly 2,000. However chronic lack of parts crippled this industrial feat. Only 29% (599) aircraft were serviceable, of which 170 were bombers, of which all were vastly inferior and vulnerable to the Luftwaffe's Jagdgruppen equipped with the Bf 109E.

The French ground forces, now alone after Dunkirk, had virtually no air cover, and as a result the Luftwaffe was able to allow large formations of its Stukas and bombers to operate without escorts, and fighters were free to conduct sweeps to eliminate any air opposition that remained. It is estimated the French forces lost 1,274 aircraft destroyed during the campaign, the British suffered losses of 959 (477 fighters).

The battle for France had cost the Luftwaffe 28% of its front line strength, some 1,428 aircraft destroyed. A further 488 were damaged, making a total of 36% of the Luftwaffe strength negatively affected. The Luftwaffe still retained a total reserve strength of 10,000 pilots, which would be needed in the battle of attrition that was to follow over the British Isles.

== Battle of Britain ==
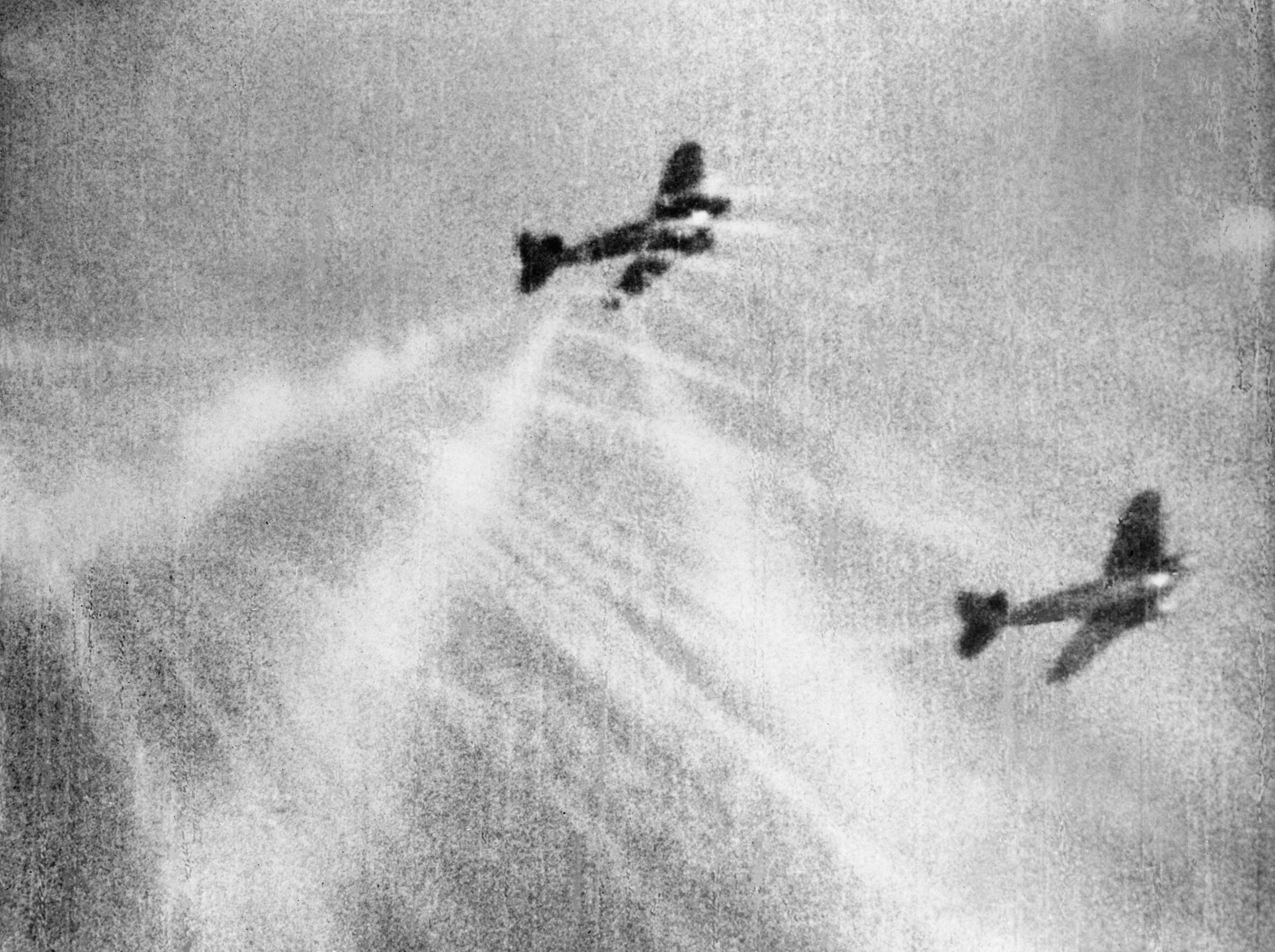
Gun camera film shows tracer ammunition from a Supermarine Spitfire Mark I of 609 Squadron, flown by Flight Lieutenant J H G McArthur, hitting a Heinkel He 111 on its starboard quarter.

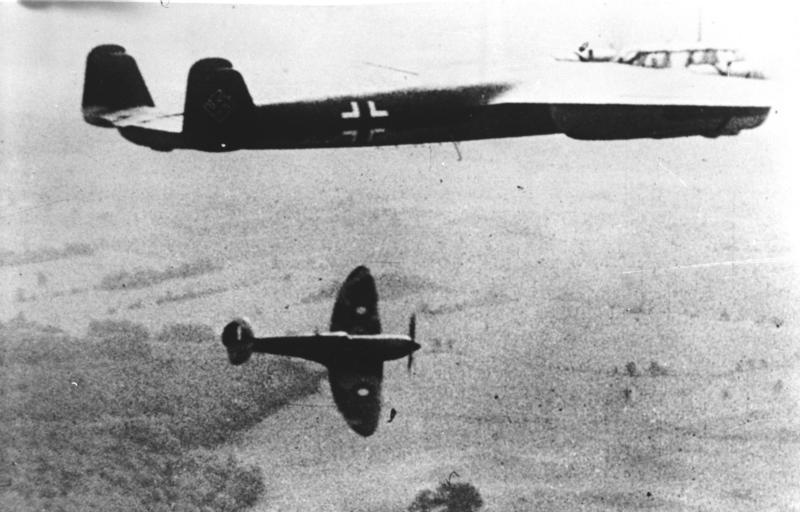
Dornier Do 17 and Spitfire clash in the battle

Following the successful campaign in France, and as a prerequisite for Operation Sea Lion, the invasion of Britain, the Royal Air Force (RAF) had to be defeated. The earlier successes had caused Göring to become overly confident in its abilities and made him boast that the RAF would be defeated in a matter of days.

The Luftwaffe had been designed as a tactical air force to support ground forces on the battlefield and had operated this way during the continental campaigns with enormous success. In the Battle of Britain, however, the Luftwaffe was ordered to operate alone, as a strategic weapon. This new role was something the Luftwaffe had never been designed for: it lacked the strategic bombers and long-range fighters needed to initiate a strategic bombing campaign. Therefore, the Luftwaffe's first task was to ensure air supremacy over southeast England, to pave the way for an invasion fleet.

The Luftwaffe committed three Luftflotten to the campaign. Luftflotte 2, under Generalfeldmarschall Albert Kesselring, was allocated to targets in the southwest and the London area. Luftflotte 3, under Generalfeldmarschall Hugo Sperrle, targeted the West Midlands and northwest of England. Luftflotte 5, led by Generaloberst Hans-Jürgen Stumpff and based in Norway, was deployed against targets in the north of England and Scotland. The raids against the north were disastrous for the Luftwaffe, and the Germans never again attempted large scale raids against the north of England. They deployed Stuka dive bombers at first in raids in the south of England, but they performed poorly and many were shot down by the RAF. They had to be withdrawn from the battle.

The German air crews were overall more experienced but the standard of fighter aircraft was even. The Bf 109E was slightly better in all round performance than the Hawker Hurricane, however the Bf 109 and the Supermarine Spitfire were equally matched. The Bf 109 was faster at high altitude and the Spitfire had the advantage at medium heights. The Messerschmitts carried heavy armament in the shape of two 20 mm MG FF cannons. A significant advantage for the German fighter was its fuel injected engine, which allowed it to perform negative-G maneuvers without the engine cutting-out. The Spitfire and Hurricane lacked this capability. The twin-engined Messerschmitt Bf 110 had performed well in the earlier campaigns. It was well-armed and had the range to escort the bombers deep into enemy territory, which the Bf 109 lacked. Its fatal flaw was that in comparison to the British fighters it was unmaneuverable and therefore vulnerable.

In August 1940, the RAF narrowly avoided defeat. It was a close run battle, and by late August, with the Luftwaffe hammering RAF airfields and communications in south east England, the situation had become desperate. The RAF committed its last reserves, made up largely of inexperienced pilots with only hours of combat training. Saundby concludes, "had the Germans persisted in their policy for another fortnight the result would have been disastrous for Fighter Command." He also stresses the pressure put on the Fighter Units by the Luftwaffe, "The worst hit Squadrons were sent north to quieter sectors to recuperate, but all too soon 'rested' squadrons would have to return to the South East."

Calais, September 1940. Göring giving a speech to pilots about the change in tactics to bomb the towns instead of the airfields.

The essential plan for the invasion was air superiority over the beachheads. Göring convinced Hitler that the air war was almost won and that in fact the RAF was in its death throes. Hitler switched targets to London. He hoped to draw out the RAF and completely destroy its remaining strength while devastating civilian morale through mass bombing. It was ultimately this critical error that helped lead to Fighter Command's recovery. The airfields were repaired, and pilot numbers were stabilized and then gradually increased through the influx of new pilots.

On 15 September 1940 Göring sent nearly 1,000 aircraft against London suffering losses of 175 aircraft destroyed or damaged in the day's fighting. On 17 September 1940 Hitler postponed the invasion. The Luftwaffe switched to a terror bombing campaign against British cities that lasted until the spring of 1941, when most bomber units were redeployed for the imminent invasion of the USSR. The raids often caused spectacular damage but did little to harm the British war effort. Hitler again postponed the invasion on 13 October 1940 until the spring of 1941. But on 18 December 1940 Hitler issued Directive 21, beginning preparations for the attack on the USSR, effectively canceling the invasion. Although defeated the Luftwaffe remained formidable: as Winston Churchill concluded, "it was not the beginning of the end but the end of the beginning." The Battle of Britain cost the Luftwaffe 873 fighters and 1,014 bombers. The RAF lost 1,023 fighters. Never again did the Luftwaffe operate in such numbers over Britain.

General Werner Kreipe described it as a "strategic (Luftwaffe) failure" and a "turning point in the Second World War". The German Air Force was described as "bled almost to death, and suffered losses that could never be made good throughout the course of the war". Quoting Dr (Karl) Klee "The invasion and subjugation of Britain was made to depend on that battle, and its outcome therefore materially influenced the further course and fate of the war as a whole".

It is argued by historians that Britain's defeat of the Luftwaffe during the Battle of Britain was the most significant in causing the downfall of the German Air Force.

== North Africa and the Mediterranean 1941–1944 ==
In North Africa and the Mediterranean, the Luftwaffe mainly saw action in support of the ground operations conducted by General Erwin Rommel's Afrika Korps. The Afrika Korps fought in North Africa from February 1941 to May 1943.

Before Rommel's arrival, Mussolini's invasion of Greece, in October 1940 and the Italian offensive against the British in Egypt the previous month had been a complete disaster. The British had driven the Italian forces back into Libya, and now seemed poised to sweep them out of Africa altogether. The Greek Army had also pushed back the Italians into Italian-occupied Albania, and, while the Greeks hesitated to ask for British troops for fear of German intervention, a few RAF squadrons participated in the operations against the Italians. Hitler was infuriated that the British were now within striking distance to the vital Romanian oil fields of Ploieşti. The Germans postponed their attack on the USSR from 15 May 1941, to the 22 June in order to secure their south-eastern flank. Germany began preparing for Operation Marita, the invasion of Greece via Bulgaria.

At this point, Yugoslavia's refusal to join the Axis camp incurred Hitler's wrath. The Yugoslavian government under Regent Prince Paul had initially been in favour of joining Germany. But a coup d'état had toppled the government, deposed the Regent, and proclaimed the teenage Peter II as king. In response to this, Hitler ordered the invasion of Yugoslavia, "Operation Punishment" (Strafgericht). During the bombing of Belgrade, the center of the Yugoslavian capital was destroyed and 15,000 people killed and made homeless. The bombing started 6 April and continued for four days until 10 April.

The Luftwaffe provided invaluable air support during the rapidly victorious Balkans Campaign. It quickly established absolute air superiority, allowing the German Army to carry out the conquest of Yugoslavia and Greece within only three weeks (from 6–30 April 1941). Once again the Stuka came back into its own during these campaigns. Having suffered heavy losses during operations over Britain, the Luftwaffe command realised it was vulnerable against a well-organised and determined air defense. These components were lacking in the Yugoslavian Air Force, and as a result the Stuka was able to operate effectively without fear of opposition. The Stukas took a heavy toll of Yugoslav ground and naval forces, which including the destruction of most of its torpedo-boats and sinking the 1870-ton seaplane tender Zmaj. During the very brief campaign in Yugoslavia, the Luftwaffe engaged the Yugoslavian Air Force's Do 17s and Bf 109s. The Yugoslavs had license built nearly 50 of the Do 17, but most of these were destroyed or captured.

The offensive continued into Greece in which the Luftwaffe eliminated Greek and British opposition in the air, although many strong points on the ground such as Fort Istibei, and other parts of the Metaxas Line held out under relentless air assault for several days. The Battle of Crete remained to be fought. The Greek island was seized by airborne assault, but cost the Luftwaffe 370 aircraft destroyed or damaged, including 271 Junkers Ju 52 transports. General Kurt Student, the commander of the airborne forces commented, "Crete was the grave of the German paratroopers".

In May 1941, the Luftwaffe also committed "Flyer Command Iraq" (Fliegerführer Irak) to support the rebels in the Anglo-Iraqi War. Fliegerführer Irak comprised one squadron (staffel) of He 111s (4./KG 4), one staffel of Zerstörer (Bf 110s of 4./ZG 76), and 12 transports including a number of Junkers Ju 90s. The ten-day stint in the Middle East included two victories for future night fighter Experte, Leutnant Martin Drewes. Allied air opposition was light and the Luftwaffe force concentrated mainly on ground support duties. By 26 May, despite cannibalising two machines damaged in an RAF raid on Mosul there was not a single serviceable Bf 110 left. The following day personnel were evacuated by Junkers Ju 90s following Allied gains.

In the 1943 Dodecanese Campaign, Luftwaffe units were instrumental in stopping the British Army from getting control of strategic islands like Leros and Kos. During the Battle of Leros they brought about one of the last German victories in World War II. The Luftwaffe remained in the Mediterranean theatre until the end of the war in May 1945. The most notable fighter unit in North Africa was Jagdgeschwader 27 that for nearly eighteen months (April 1941 – October 1942) was the only fighter unit in North Africa, although many other fighter units took part throughout the Mediterranean.

The strength of the Luftwaffe made all the difference during the North African Campaign. The Luftwaffe supported the Afrika Korps in the Western Desert and Tunisia. In addition to North Africa, the Germans joined the Italians in bombing Malta in 1941–42, but failed to eliminate British occupation of the island. The heroic resistance of the island was marked by the award of the George Cross medal to the island.

== Soviet-German war ==
=== 1941 ===
On 18 December 1940, Adolf Hitler issued Directive 21, for the invasion of the Soviet Union, code-named "Operation Barbarossa". The directive envisaged three army groups, each a million men strong, undertaking a simultaneous offensive from Germany-occupied Poland and German-allied Romania and Finland. The main objectives were Leningrad, Minsk, Kiev, and Moscow. The original German goals involved the destruction of the Red Army in border battles and rapid conquest of the European part of the Soviet Union to a line connecting the cities of Arkhangelsk and Astrakhan, often referred to as the A–A line, to the west of the Ural Mountains.

The Soviet purges of the 1930s affected all branches of the USSR military, including the Soviet Red Air Force. The poor performance of the VVS (Voenno-Vozdushnye Sily) during the Winter War with Finland had increased the Luftwaffe's confidence that the Soviet forces could be easily defeated. The standard of flight training had been accelerated in preparation for a German attack that was expected to come in 1942 or later. As a result, Soviet pilot training was extremely poor.

The Soviet war effort in the first phase of the Eastern front war was severely hampered by the obsolete aviation industry. In 1941 the MiG-3, LaGG-3 and Yak-1 were just starting to roll off the production lines but were inferior in all-round performance to the Bf 109. Many of these aircraft were delivered before Barbarossa, but most of these were destroyed on the ground.

The German advantage lay in high standards of tactical deployment, training and experience. The first task of the Luftwaffe was the destruction of the Soviet Air force to establish control of the skies. To achieve this, four Luftflotte (air fleets) were deployed with a strength of 4,389 aircraft, of which 2,598 were combat aircraft. In addition to this the German-Allied nations; Italy, Romania, Bulgaria and Hungary committed another 980 combat aircraft. Of the Luftwaffe contingent 929 were medium bombers. The Luftwaffe had fewer bombers than at the start of the Battle of Britain because of heavy losses the previous summer.

The attack on 22 June 1941 came as a complete surprise to the Soviet High Command. Unprepared, the Red Air Force lost enormous numbers of aircraft on the ground. Many of the Red Air Force pilots had not been trained properly on the fighters they were allocated, making missions less effective. The situation was so one-sided that some Soviet pilots resorted to ramming German aircraft if they could.

The scale of the Luftwaffe's victory on the first day of operations was doubted by its commander-in-chief, Hermann Göring. The official report claimed 1,489 Soviet aircraft destroyed. Göring ordered this checked. After picking their way through the wreckages across the front, Luftwaffe officers found that the tally exceeded 2,000. The Luftwaffe's losses stood at 78 (24 Bf 109s, 23 Ju 88s, 11 He 111s, 7 Bf 110s, 2 Ju 87s, 1 Do 17 and 10 transport and reconnaissance aircraft). Also lost were 12 aircraft from the Romanian Air Force. Due to the scale of the operations of 22 June 1941, however, losses of German aircraft paralleled those of the Luftwaffe's worst day in the Battle of Britain.

In a desperate bid to stop the rapid German advance the Soviets sent huge waves of unescorted bombers to blunt the German Panzer divisions thrusts into Soviet territory. The result was appalling Soviet losses. Jagdgeschwader 77 shot down 47 VVS bombers on the 25 June. A particularly disastrous day for the Russians came on 29 June when Jagdgeschwader 51 shot down 65 bombers during the day. By the 18 July it had shot down 500 Soviet aircraft in combat.

The Germans were assured of air-superiority throughout the year. The VVS, although continually resisting, was powerless to prevent the Luftwaffe inflicting heavy losses to Soviet ground forces, and for the rest of 1941 the Luftwaffe could devote much of its energy to these ground support missions. In the following two days the Soviets reported the loss of another 1,922 aircraft. Three weeks into the campaign German pilot Werner Mölders scored his 100th aerial victory, the first pilot to do so.

The Luftwaffe was particularly effective in breaking up and destroying Soviet armored divisions. The Soviet tank force had an estimated strength of 15,000 tanks at the beginning of the invasion. By October that force had, in the central sector, been reduced to 150. Despite the clear victories being won and the rapid advances deep into Soviet territory, the Luftwaffe had lost nearly 1,000 aircraft destroyed within the first two months. It became apparent that the Luftwaffe could not sustain these losses for long. The increasing distances meant delivery of replacement manpower and machinery took much longer and spare parts to replace battle damaged aircraft became a problem. Despite this the Luftwaffe had reduced the Soviets to a mere 389 aircraft in the central sector of the front.

The Luftwaffe supported all three army groups in their push eastward and it helped the ground forces achieve a spectacular victory at Kiev in which an estimated 600,000 Red Army soldiers were killed or captured. The impact of the Luftwaffe during these months was critical to the pace of the advance. During the Battle of Kiev the Luftwaffe accounted for 2,171 Soviet vehicles and 23 Soviet tanks, and 107 Soviet aircraft destroyed between 12 and 21 September 1941, and inflicted heavy casualties to the Soviet ground troops. Soviet prisoners revealed that the Stuka attacks in particular devastated morale. On 15 September Heinkels of 3./Kampfgeschwader 55 destroyed eight locomotives in a single sortie. But the drive toward Moscow was halted during the two-month campaign, giving the defenders of the Soviet capital time to prepare defenses and move an enormous amount of industry eastward.

During this month, Stuka pilot Hans-Ulrich Rudel sank the Soviet battleship Marat, during an air attack on Kronstadt harbour in the Leningrad area, with a hit to the bow with a 1000 kg armour-piercing bomb. Several other Soviet ships were sunk in this engagement. The Soviet Navy suffered heavy losses at the hands of the Luftwaffe during the war.

By the end of 1941 the Luftwaffe had been reduced to just 30–40% of their original strength. The winter weather and the snow caused damage to aircraft, as engines seized and the oil and fuel froze inside the tanks. The Luftwaffe was losing as many aircraft damaged than in combat. The Luftwaffe also lost its General der Jagdflieger Werner Mölders, who was killed on 22 November in an accident, sapping morale even further.

The Wehrmacht was now pushing toward Moscow and the Luftwaffe delivered its first raids over the capital but caused little damage. The Russians however were reinforced with fresh forces from Siberia including significant numbers of the T-34 tanks and nearly 1,000 aircraft. The Russian counter-attack, despite Luftwaffe intervention, succeeded in pushing the Germans back in December, saving Moscow and cutting off large parts of Army Group Centre. Faced with annihilation of its forces in the central sector, the Luftwaffe was ordered to increase its efforts, and it managed to prevent the destruction of the central front forces. The VVS now had numerical superiority.

The failure of the Luftwaffe during Barbarossa was reflected in its losses, with 2,093 aircraft of all types being destroyed. Soviet losses stand at 21,200 destroyed, 10,000 in combat, of which 7,500 were shot down by the Luftwaffe fighters, who could now boast some of the top aces like Günther Lützow who had already surpassed the 100 victory mark; these scores were to increase over time. The successes of the German air arm were offset by the losses which unlike the Soviet Air Force could not be replaced easily as the German economy had not yet been put on a full war footing. Losses in personnel were also high and irreplaceable with 3,231 killed, 2,028 missing and 8,453 wounded.

The campaign in Russia had commenced with an insufficient number of combat aircraft. The reduction in serviceable aircraft, in particular dive-bombers, meant medium-bomber and fighter-bomber units were rushing to "hot-spots" to prevent enemy gains. Arguably the lack of a strategic bomber force denied the Luftwaffe the opportunity to attack Soviet industry and would prove fatal to the success of the Axis campaign, as Soviet production continued to increase which would help the Soviets maintain high numbers of aircraft and gain numerical and then, briefly, air superiority in November/December 1941.

=== 1942 ===
The Wehrmacht's failure to achieve victory in the Soviet Union before 1941 was not a complete disaster for the German war effort as on all fronts the Germans still held the strategic initiative. The entry of the United States into the war, on the side of the Allies, in December 1941 however, would pit its enormous industrial power against Germany. Hitler had stated that he would avoid a war on two fronts and knew he needed to end the war on the Eastern Front before the Americans built up significant strength in Europe.

Hitler and the Oberkommando der Wehrmacht (OKW) had decided that the main offensive effort of the Wehrmacht should fall in the south, to capture or cut off the Caucasus oil fields from the rest of Russia, then move north out-flanking Moscow from the south. Conquering the Caucasus would also doom the considerable Soviet forces holding Sevastopol in the Crimea. The operation became known as Operation Fall Blau.

The Luftwaffe assisted with the capture of Sevastopol by subjecting Soviet defenses in and around the city to heavy assault, the bombings mainly carried out by Luftflotte 4. The Luftwaffe had effectively dealt with Soviet opposition in the air, the VVS force of 300 had been destroyed leaving the Luftwaffe to operate unmolested, with air support the city fell on 4 July 1942. The Battle of Sevastopol had seen the Luftwaffe support the German Army extremely effectively. With the Eastern Front largely quiet in early 1942, the Luftwaffe was able to concentrate its forces, as it had done in previous campaigns. The Russians also lacked adequate air cover in the Crimea, allowing the Luftwaffe to avoid the time-consuming task of achieving air superiority. During the summer offensive the Luftwaffe would find itself increasingly spread thin on the eastern front while contesting powerful numerical forces of the VVS.

The Luftwaffe was also instrumental in the Second Battle of Kharkov destroying enemy airpower of 615 aircraft whilst destroying hundreds of tanks. The German air-arm had helped the Army achieve another spectacular victory.

As Fall Blau began the Luftwaffe wiped out the strong contingent of VVS forces and were instrumental in disrupting supply lines and destroying enemy troop and vehicle concentrations. By 19 November, 2,846 Soviet aircraft were destroyed. In an unwelcome turn of events for the Luftwaffe the Soviets started to operate large numbers of British lend-lease aircraft like the Hawker Hurricane. In the opening month the Luftwaffe lost 251 aircraft but the advance was in full swing and the Germans looked set to take the Kuban food producing region and the Baku oil fields.

Due to appalling losses Soviet resistance in the air was radically reduced in August. But even without the threat of enemy air attack the Wehrmacht's supply lines were long and difficult to maintain.

The Luftwaffe continued to pound the Soviet Navy's Black Sea Fleet and inflicted heavy losses to Soviet Shipping. From February–August the Germans had sunk 68 freighters, a flotilla leader, three destroyers and three submarines. Despite such successes and air support the advance had slowed to a "snail's pace" in the Kuban region, with its forces spread thin, the Luftwaffe was powerless to prevent Soviet aircraft inflicting considerable losses to the Army.

As the Battle of Stalingrad got underway the Luftwaffe was now operating often from poor airfields, which caused accidents and damaged aircraft, which the Luftwaffe could ill afford. As a result of the bombing of Stalingrad, which was largely destroyed, the Luftwaffe created ruins in which the Red Army could defend effectively.

The Luftwaffe had, by October 1942 flown over 20,000 individual sorties but its original strength (in the shape of Luftflotte 4 with 1,600 aircraft) had fallen 40% to 950 aircraft. The bomber units had been hardest hit having only 232 out of a force of 480 left. The Luftwaffe still held air superiority but clearly its strength was being eroded. The Russian output of aircraft continued unabated—no matter how many enemy machines were destroyed, more appeared, while its own much smaller losses, particularly among the crews, were becoming serious. The Luftwaffe's Sturzkampfgeschwader made maximum effort during this phase of the war flying 500 sorties per day and causing heavy losses among Soviet forces losing just an average of one Stuka per day.

On 19 November 1942 the Soviets launched Operation Uranus which cut off the entire German Sixth Army. Göring assured Hitler that the Luftwaffe could airlift in supplies to the surrounded Army. Hans Jeschonnek also convinced Hitler that if both bombers and transports were used and the airfields in and outside the pocket were maintained the operation was possible. The Luftwaffe tried to fulfill these grand promises, but failed to deliver the required tonnage and the German Sixth Army surrendered on 2 February 1943. The Luftwaffe had managed to evacuate 30,000 wounded German soldiers, and supply the Army with 8,350.7 tons of food and ammunition. However some 488 aircraft, including 266 Junkers Ju 52 transports (one-third of the Luftwaffe's Eastern Front strength) and 165 Heinkel He 111s were lost. The Luftwaffe also suffered casualties of nearly 1,000 airmen, many highly experienced bomber pilots. The Soviet losses in aircraft in 1942 had totalled 14,700, along with thousands of pilots. The Battle at Stalingrad had turned the tide of the war in the east in favour of the Soviet Union.

=== 1943 ===
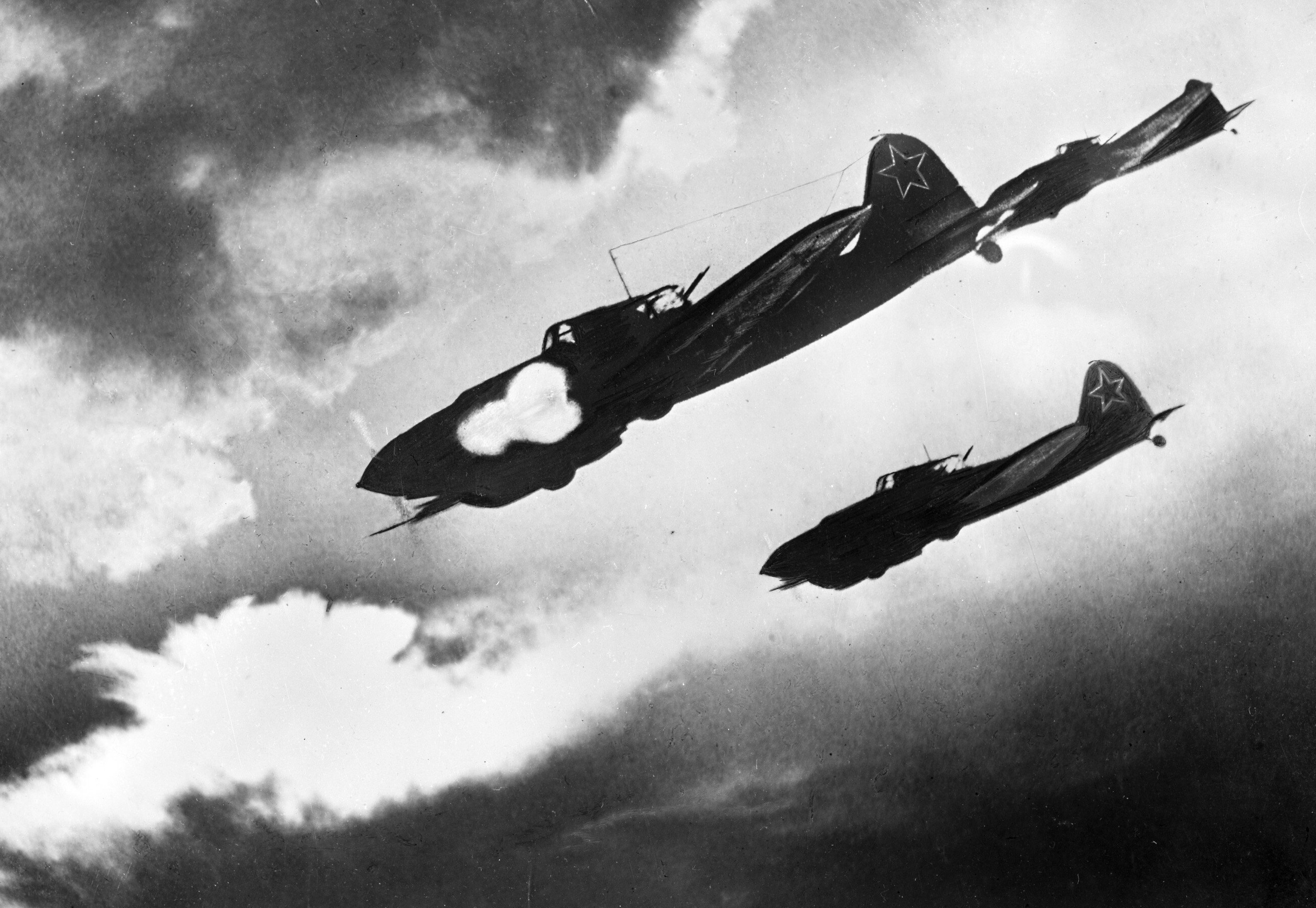
Soviet Il-2 planes attacking a German column during the battle of Kursk

Despite the disaster at Stalingrad the Oberkommando der Wehrmacht decided to launch another offensive in the summer of 1943 in which Hitler had hoped would cut off the large salient now protruding into the German front, eliminating the large Soviet Forces within it and turning the tide once more into the Wehrmacht's favour. This new operation was named Operation Citadel, which became the Battle of Kursk. To support the ground forces the Luftwaffe committed I. Fliegerkorps and VIII. Fliegerkorps under Luftflotte 6 and Luftflotte 4 (under the command of Generalfeldmarschall Robert Ritter von Greim and Generalfeldmarschall Wolfram Freiherr von Richthofen respectively). Some 2, 109 machines were allotted to the air fleets, 65 percent were operational.

On 5 July the Germans began the offensive. The Luftwaffe rendered more invaluable support to the Army despite the operations failure. By the 12 July I. Fliegerkorps flew 37,241 sorties dropping 20,000 tons of bombs destroying 1,735 Soviet aircraft, 1,100 tanks, 1,300 vehicles for the loss of 64 of its own. Its Kampf and Jagdgruppen flew between six and seven sorties per day over Kursk. Examination of Soviet archive records indicate the loss of 677 aircraft in the southern sector of the Kursk salient, for the period 5–31 July. On the Northern Sector Soviet losses were 439. The Luftwaffe Generalquartiermiester reported a loss of 687 machines with 420 totally destroyed, 220 of them on the northern sector. In the following month Soviet losses were to reach 1,104 for 12 July–18 August.

Attritional air battle alarmingly depleted the Luftwaffe's strength. 911 aircraft were lost in July, while inflicting much heavier losses on the Soviet Air Forces, whose strength appeared to be undiminished. The Soviet 11th Guards Army initiated an offensive aimed at cutting off the 2. Panzerarmee and German 9th Army. The Luftwaffe was called upon to rescue the situation in a huge aerial counter-offensive lasting from 16 July–31 July against a Soviet offensive at Khotynets and saved two German armies from encirclement, reducing the attacking Soviet 11th Guards Army to just 33 tanks by 20 July. The Soviet offensive had been completely halted from the air Model sent a message to von Greim thanking him, stating "the Luftwaffe's intervention was absolutely decisive to prevent a second, more disastrous Stalingrad".

By October 1943 with the Soviet forces pushing the Wehrmacht back toward the Dnieper, the Luftwaffe had some 1,150 of its aircraft, 60 percent of its eastern front strength concentrated around Kiev. By December the Luftwaffe had just 425 operational fighters alone on the eastern front.

== The Battle of the Atlantic ==
Following some early experience in support of the war at sea during the Norwegian Campaign, the Luftwaffe contributed small amounts of forces to the Battle of the Atlantic from 1940 to 1944. These were primarily long-range reconnaissance planes, first with Focke-Wulf Fw 200 and later Junkers Ju 290 maritime patrol aircraft. The initial Focke-Wulf aircraft were very successful, claiming 365,000 tons of shipping in early 1941. The development of escort carriers and increased efforts by RAF Coastal Command soon made the task more dangerous and less rewarding for the Luftwaffe though. The defeats on the Eastern Front, in North Africa and the ever-increasing raids of British bombers of the Reich ensured that the Luftwaffe's naval arm, the Fliegerfuhrer Atlantik was denied the necessary resources to combat Allied air and naval superiority over the Atlantic. By the end of 1943 a Gruppe of He 177s, that had been committed, lost 17 of their number to air opposition. These units had trained with radio controlled anti-shipping bombs, and this loss of fully trained crews prompted a switch to night fighting with even fewer successes. The Luftwaffe also contributed fighter cover for U-boats venturing out into and returning from the Atlantic, and for returning blockade runners.

== Development of night fighting ==
Although night fighting had been undertaken in embryonic form in World War I, the German night fighter force, the Nachtjagd, had to virtually start from scratch when British bombers began to attack targets in Germany in strength from 1940 as far as tactics were concerned. A chain of radar stations was established all across the Reich territory from Norway to the border with Switzerland known as the "Kammhuber Line", named after Generalleutnant Josef Kammhuber, and nearby night fighter wings, Nachtjagdgeschwader (NJG), were alerted to the presence of the enemy. These wings were equipped mostly with Messerschmitt Bf 110 and Junkers Ju 88 aircraft, which would later be outfitted with the Lichtenstein nose-mounted radar.

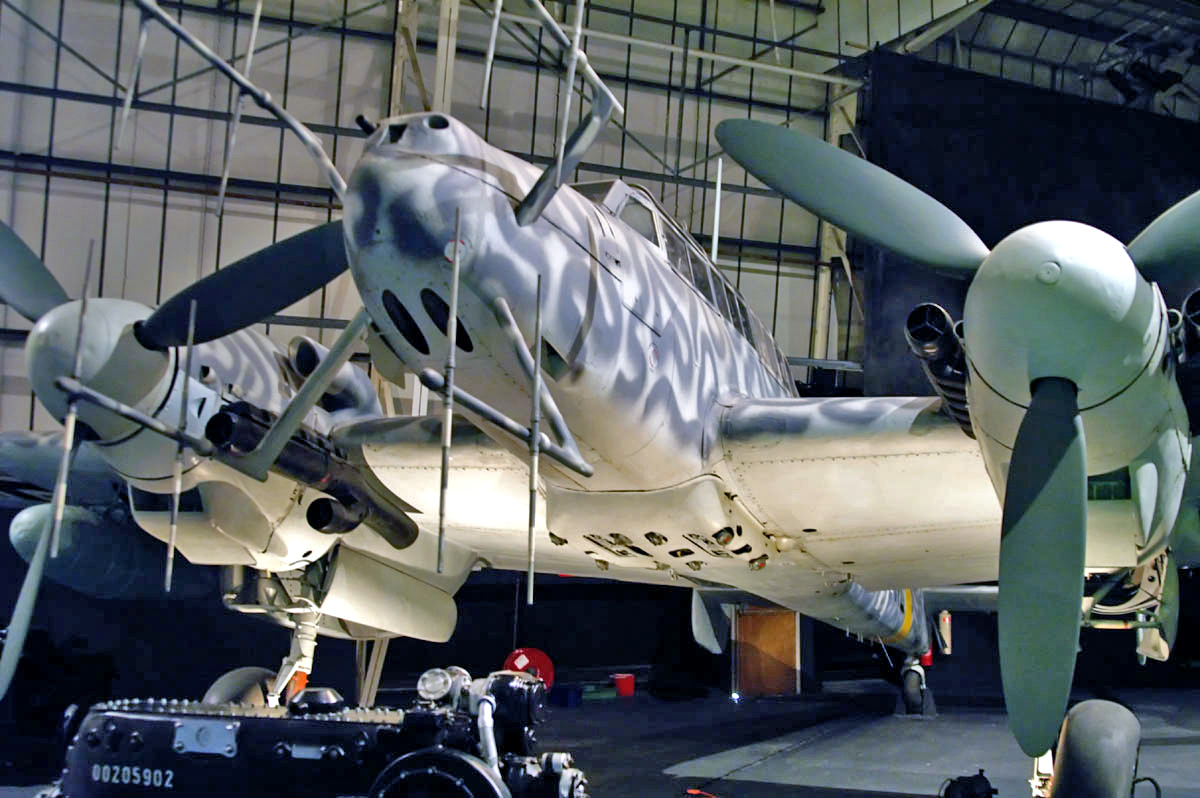
A Bf 110 G-4 night fighter at the RAF Museum in London, in skyglow-influenced lighter night camouflage colors.

The Messerschmitt Bf 110 was the most successful night fighter that served in the Luftwaffe. Among the most notable night fighter aces were Helmut Lent, who shot down 110 enemy aircraft and Heinz-Wolfgang Schnaufer, who shot down 121 enemy aircraft. Lent mostly flew in the Bf 110 (and variants of the Ju 88), while Schnaufer flew the Bf 110 exclusively. The Bf 110's main strength was its ability to carry heavy armament in its nose section. The later G series was fitted with 20 mm MG FF/M cannons and sometimes with two 30 mm MK 108 cannons. Starting in Mid'1944 the Bf 110 G-4 night fighters entered serial production with two MG FF/M as the Schräge Musik 'off-bore gun' (upward firing) system for attacking Allied bombers from underneath with several units field modifying their Bf 110 with this system some time earlier. The Schräge Musik cannons were typically mounted in the rearmost glazed area of the cockpit in the Bf 110 or in the fuselage behind the cockpit on other machines. Several Dornier Do 217, Junkers Ju 88 and Heinkel He 219 carried similar installations. To compound the British night bomber problems the Avro Lancaster, Handley Page Halifax and Short Stirling did not carry ventral ball turrets under their fuselage, making them vulnerable to this kind of attack.

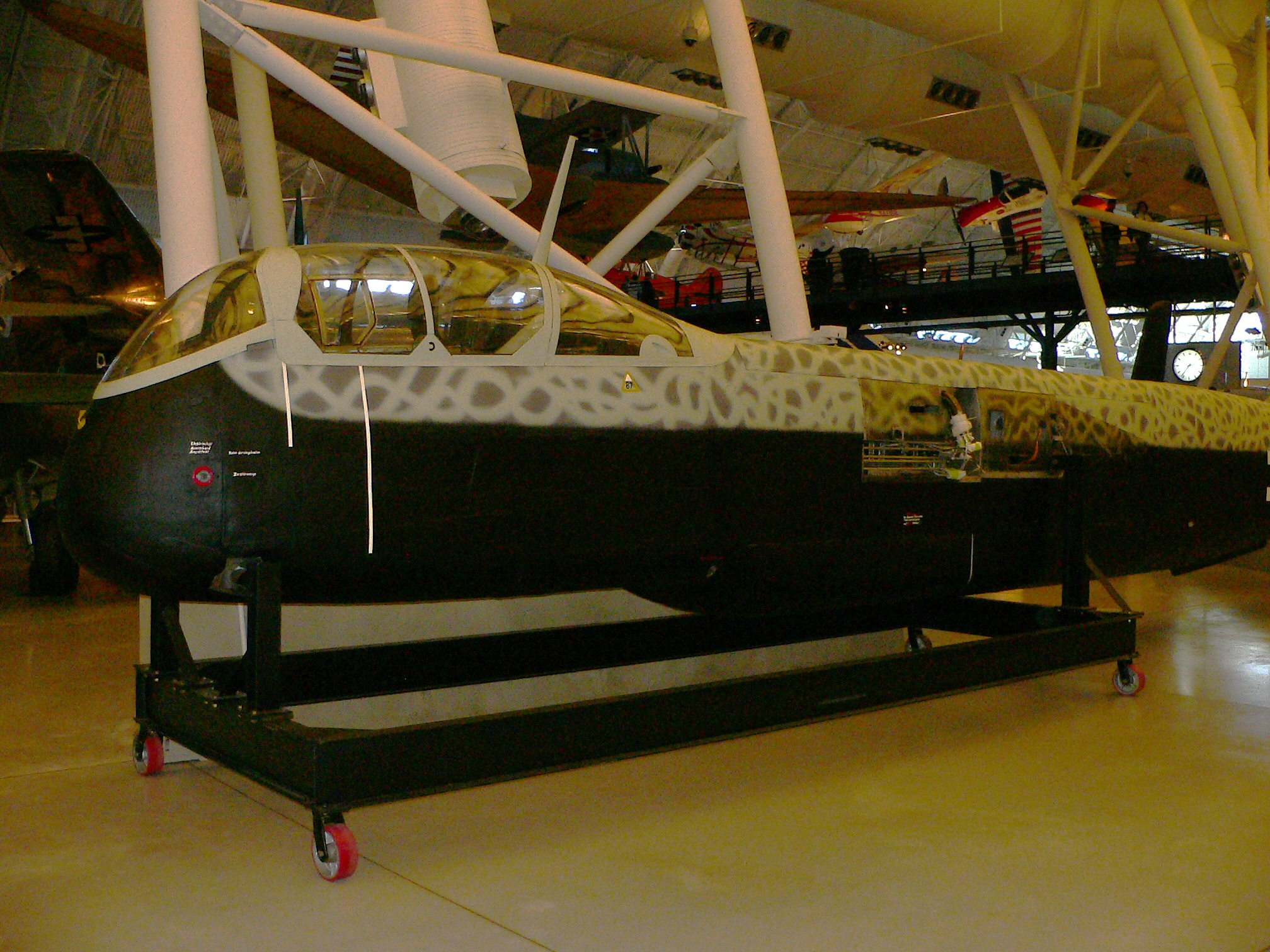
The NASM's He 219 night fighter, showing the later black side/undersurface color for late-war Luftwaffe night fighters.

During the 1942–43 timeframe, the formerly all-black night fighter camouflage used by Luftwaffe night fighters had yielded to a light-color camouflage scheme that took advantage of the skyglow over German cities at night — this generally comprised the use of the Luftwaffe's usual Hellblau light blue undersurface color for diurnal-flown aircraft, and a light gray base coat over the upper surfaces to match the skyglow over the German cities they were tasked with defending. The light gray base color usually had irregular patterns of darker gray splotches or irregular wavy lines spread over the light gray areas to increase the camouflage effect. Later in WW II, Luftwaffe night fighters, like some of the Kampfgeschwader-flown He 177A heavy bombers being used at night, switched back to a black coloration for the undersurfaces and vertical sides of the airframe, while retaining the light gray with dark gray-color disruptive patterns established in the mid-war period.

During mid-1943, a Luftwaffe bomber pilot, Major Hajo Herrmann devised a new plan for night attacks. Bombers were silhouetted over the target areas from the fires below and searchlights, which would make them vulnerable to attack from above. Three Jagdgeschwader, (JG 300, JG 301 and JG 302) were tasked with these operations codenamed as Wilde Sau attacks. The units were equipped with Bf 109 G-6/N and Fw 190 A-5/U2, both aircraft versions were modified for night use and some of them were fitted with a Naxos passive radar detector. The FuG 350 Naxos-Z detector set could track enemy H2S radar transmissions from a range of thirty miles, which enable the German fighters to "home in" on British Bombers. Herrmann's tactics were reasonably successful, but the 30 Jagddivision only saw action until it was disbanded in March 1944.

In early 1944, to counter the Luftwaffe's NachtJagdgeschwader, the British operated Mosquito night fighters in the bomber support role, with RAF Bomber Commands 100 Group. These units were tasked with harassing the German night fighter airfields, and disrupting their operations and attacking them when they were most vulnerable, during takeoff and landing.

== Defense of the Reich, 1942–1945 ==
=== The Luftwaffe on top ===
Between 1942 and 1945 the Luftwaffe had to continually expend its resources to counter the Allied strategic bombing campaign against targets deep inside Germany itself. RAF Bomber Command under Sir Arthur Harris had begun bombing German targets in early 1942, but after heavy losses switched to night bombing. The U.S. Army Air Forces (USAAF)'s Eighth Air Force eventually joined in the autumn of 1942 flying daylight missions. This campaign became known as The Defense of the Reich.

In 1941 the Focke-Wulf Fw 190 fighter began to partially replace the Bf 109 as the main Luftwaffe fighter type. The Fw 190 proved to be more manoeuvrable and better armed, but its performance above 20,000 ft (6,100 m) dropped considerably. The Bf 109G and K could fight well at high altitudes and were a match for Allied fighters in performance. It was decided by the Oberkommando der Luftwaffe to keep both the Fw 190 and Bf 109 in production. The Fw 190s were to be used primarily as bomber destroyers while the Bf 109, the superior of the two at high altitude, would engage any escorting fighters.

In total more than 11,000 heavy bombers of the RAF and USAAF were lost in the European theatre of operations between 1942 and 1945. One of the most disastrous RAF raids occurring on (October 30–31, 1943) when the RAF bombed the Bavarian city of Nuremberg, losing 96 bombers over Germany, and a further number on return to base.

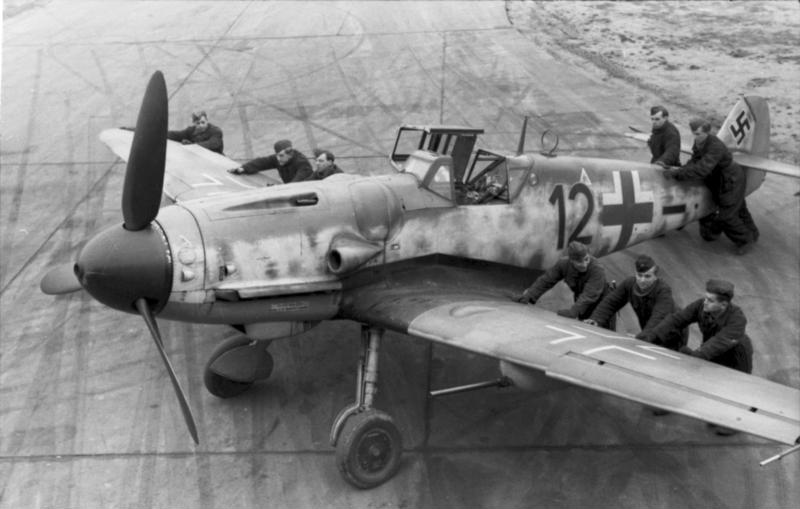
Messerschmitt Bf 109 G-6 with additional underwing 20 mm MG 151 cannon. The Bf 109 was the backbone of the day Jagdwaffe (fighter force) throughout the war.

Unlike the Germans, prior to the war the RAF and the USAAF (under the command of General Henry H. Arnold), developed strategic bomber forces. From 1942 onwards their bombers penetrated deep into Reich's territory in increasing numbers. This forced the Luftwaffe to substantially increase the fighter allocation to the Western Front in 1943, which in the Allied intelligence estimate, accounted for 60% of the total, with the Russian Front allocated 22% and the Mediterranean Front 18% of its fighters.

The British had tried to convince the Americans that daylight bombing could not be accomplished as Allied fighters lacked the range to escort bombers to and from the target. Initially the British were to be proved right, as by the end of 1943 losses nearly halted daylight raids. The USAAF maintained an unescorted daylight bombing campaign of industrial targets until October 1943, when it lost 120 bombers in two raids on Regensburg and Schweinfurt.

On 14 October 1943, a mission to Schweinfurt cost the Americans 60 B-17s destroyed in just over three hours of continuous attacks. The target of these attacks, the ball bearing plants were dispersed before the Americans returned to Schweinfurt. Albert Speer, Hitler's armament minister, said that no weapon failed to reach the front due to a lack of ball bearings.

The Luftwaffe's victory in October 1943 was obvious to the Americans, General of the Air Force Henry H. Arnold said, "the largest and most savage fighter resistance of any war in history". In the second week of that month four full strength missions to Bremen, Marienburg, Münster and Schweinfurt had cost the Eighth Air Force 148 heavy bombers, fifty percent of its daily operational strength.

The Americans then had to direct their attacks against targets within the range of fighter cover for the bombers. The RAF, having learned this lesson, were now executing their offensive by conducting night bombing operations on an increasingly large scale, with 1,000 bomber raids being assembled from 1942. Deep-penetration raids into Germany would be suspended until long range escorting fighters became available. The P-38 with 568 litre drop tanks were rushed back to operations over Europe after a year's absence to contend with the Jagdwaffe. Until the turn of the year the Luftwaffe would maintain air superiority over its homeland.

=== The turn of the tide ===
While the Battle of Britain was described as a "turning point" and caused losses that "could never be made good throughout the course of the war" the Luftwaffe was still able to combat bombing raids by the Allies.

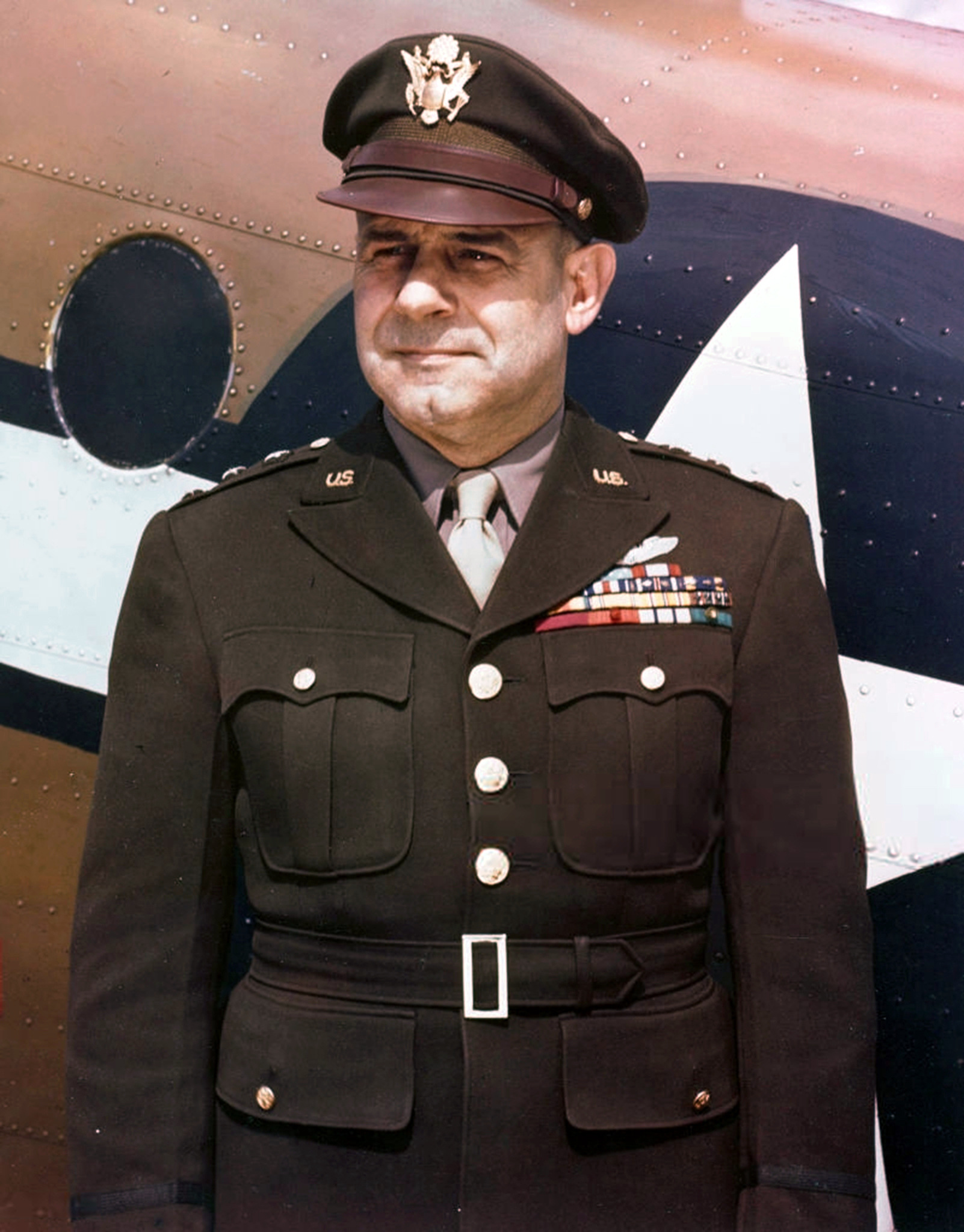
Lt. Gen. Jimmy Doolittle's change in American fighter tactics doomed the Luftwaffe fighter force during 1944.

Until the development of Allied long-range fighters the Luftwaffe remained capable of inflicting serious losses by the day fighter and night fighter units (Nachtgeschwader), as well as the anti-aircraft guns under its command. The Luftwaffe employed twin-engined Ju 88 and Bf 110 Zerstörer, or bomber destroyer units to attack American formation with rockets and heavy cannon with considerable success. However, with the arrival of the long range P-51D these units suffered heavy losses.

The disastrous Me 210, designed to replace the Bf 110, encountered design difficulties and was replaced with the Me 410 Hornisse, which was a development of the Me 210. The Me 410s were extremely vulnerable in hostile skies, and by 1944 were nothing more than cannon fodder for marauding Allied "day" fighters.

The turn in the Luftwaffe's fortunes came during Big Week in which the U.S. Eighth Air Force flying from bases in Britain, and Fifteenth Air Force flying from bases in Southern Italy, carried out raids against the German aviation industry throughout Europe. The new commander of the US Eighth Air Force, Maj. Gen. Jimmy Doolittle's major influence on the European air war occurred early in 1944 when he changed the policy requiring escorting American fighters to remain with the bombers at all times. With his permission, initially performed with P-38s and P-47s with both previous types being steadily replaced with the long-ranged P-51s as the spring of 1944 wore on, American fighter pilots on bomber defense missions would primarily be flying far ahead of the bombers' combat box formations in air supremacy mode, literally "clearing the skies" of any Luftwaffe fighter opposition heading towards the target. This strategy fatally disabled the twin-engined Zerstörergeschwader heavy fighter wings and their replacement, single-engined Sturmgruppen of heavily armed Fw 190As, clearing each force of bomber destroyers in their turn from Germany's skies throughout most of 1944. As part of this game-changing strategy, especially after the bombers had hit their targets, the USAAF's fighters were then free to strafe German airfields and transport while returning to base, contributing significantly to the achievement of air superiority by Allied air forces over Europe. During the Big Week bomber campaign of late February 1944 which started to introduce the new fighter tactics, American medium and heavy bombers together dropped roughly 10,000 tons of bombs and seriously disrupted German fighter production. During Big Week, the Eighth Air Force lost 97 B-17s. Coupled with B-24 losses the figure totaled 137 initially and 20 more scrapped due to damage. The Fifteenth Air Force lost 90 aircraft and American fighter losses stood at 28. The Luftwaffe losses were high amongst their twin-engined Zerstörer units which suffered heavy losses and decimated the Bf 110 and Me 410 Gruppen. More worrying for the Jagdwaffe was the loss of 17 per-cent of its pilots; nearly 100 were killed. The tide had turned, and air superiority had passed to the Western Allies.

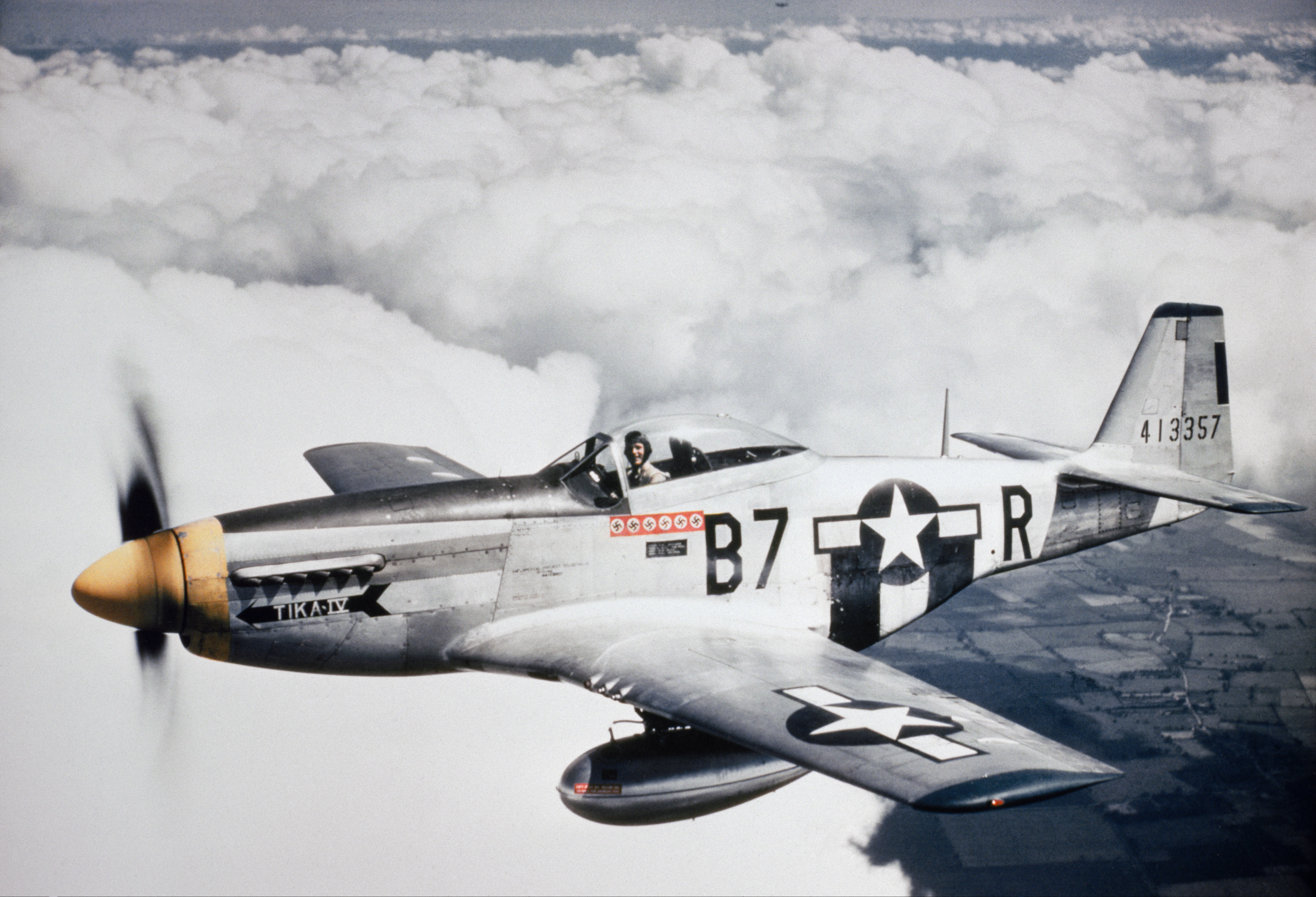
P-51D 374th Fighter Squadron. This is an early D-model, without the fin strake; 75 gallon (284 litre) drop tanks are on the wing racks.

When long-range fighter support became widely available by May 1944, the Luftwaffe's defensive effort was severely damaged. The P-51D Mustangs and P-47 Thunderbolts with extended range were now able to escort the bombers to and from the target. The Luftwaffe now did not have opportunity to attack the unprotected fleets. The resulting air battles diminished the strength of the Jagdwaffe.

U.S. and RAF fighters undertook many fighter sweeps, and the boundaries of the front line steadily moved eastward. They engaged many Luftwaffe training aircraft, and the helpless Jagdflieger of tomorrow were shot down in droves. Pilot training had become shorter in order to fill the front line Gruppen, which often had more aircraft than pilots. German aircraft production reached its peak in August 1944, finally equaling the Soviet and American output, but the production came too late to alter the outcome of the air war. The Luftwaffe had plenty of aircraft but a critical shortage of experienced fighter pilots.

The Allied air campaign was not successful in knocking Germany out of the war by itself, but it contributed significantly to the German defeat, by forcing the Germans to focus valuable resources on the battle over Germany, which were then missed on other fronts. Albert Speer said that if the 1944 campaign against the Romanian oil fields had been continued for another month, the entire Wehrmacht would have been crippled. According to Speer, 98% of Germany's aircraft fuel plants were out of production. The production of aviation fuel fell from 180,000 tons to 20,000 tons between March and November 1944.

To increase the Jagdwaffe's woes the American fighters were now flying shuttle missions and landing at bases in the Soviet Union. This tactic enabled them to extend their already considerable combat time over the target area. American enthusiasm for these missions ended when the Russians failed to defend these aircraft from Luftwaffe attacks. One such raid in March 1944 destroyed 43 B-17s and 15 P-51 fighters on the ground.

Strafing Luftwaffe airbases became commonplace as 1944 wore on, until nowhere in Europe could the Jagdwaffe remain outside of Allied range. If the fuel crisis was bad enough the casualties suffered by the now largely defunct Kampfgruppen were starting to become serious. Most bomber units were now ferrying and transporting personnel across Germany. In April/May 1944 the Luftwaffe lost 67 aircraft of this type, as far east as Dresden.

Many Allied fighter gun cameras often revealed that aircraft which had been claimed destroyed as '109's were often Arado Ar 96 trainers with a cadet pilot at the controls. To counter this non-combat flights were only to be carried out at dawn and dusk. The Luftwaffe expanded aircraft warning systems and devised radio signals to warn flights of intruders. If attacked, poorly armed aircraft were to dive down to tree-top level, and if necessary, the pilot was to belly land and take cover, as pilots were far more important than aircraft.

The Germans also used camouflage, smoke screens and resorted to burying vital communications and electrical cables serving their radar and command stations. Ammunition was stored in tunnels along with precious fuel supplies. Allied pilots also noted that the Germans covered the airfields with 20 mm quadruple and 37 mm flak guns capable of putting up withering sheets of fire in the path of low flying fighters. As a result of these measures Allied fighter losses increased.

The introduction of the B-17G with its remote controlled 'chin' turret forced a change of tactic on the Jagdwaffe. Throughout 1943 head-on attacks had proved successful against American heavy bombers. Many Luftwaffe units now upgraded the firepower of their fighters. Some Fw 190 fighters carried MK 108 30 mm cannon that could destroy most heavy bombers with two or three hits. The later variants of the Messerschmitt Bf 109 (from the Gustav onwards) were also capable of carrying heavier armament like the MK 108, although only a single barrel firing through the propeller shaft as an engine-mounted Motorkanone.

By September 1944 the Soviets were advancing into Romania and the oilfields were lost. From this time, the Luftwaffe experienced chronic shortages of fuel. Many German interceptors returning from missions switched off their engines on touching down to avoid wasting fuel. Ground crews then quickly got them under cover. By this time fighter pilot losses were becoming unbearable, and the Jagdwaffe was nearing breaking point.

== The end in the West 1944–45 ==
Between January and May 1944 the Luftwaffe undertook Operation Steinbock, the so-called Baby Blitz, assembling 474 bombers for a campaign against London. Steinbock was called off when V-1 flying bombs became available for the retribution attacks and after the loss of 329 bombers. The lack of night flying experience of the crew contributed to the losses. The bomber force, under the command of Oberst Dietrich Peltz, now had only 143 bombers available for the Normandy invasion.

By 1944 the Luftwaffe was no longer in a position to offer serious opposition to Operation Overlord, the Allied invasion of France on 6 June 1944. Only a handful of Luftwaffe operations were launched against the beachheads. The most well-known action to occur over the beaches was a strafing run conducted by the Fw 190 ace Josef Priller and his wingman, Emil Lang. The run scored 29 victories against the Western Allies, all but one over the Normandy invasion front, making Priller the highest-scoring German ace of the campaign.

During Operation Market Garden, the Allied attempt to end the war in 1944 by forcing a route through the Netherlands and into the Ruhr region of Germany, Luftwaffe fighter forces managed to inflict significant losses on Allied planes transporting paratroopers and supplies into battle, but their own losses were serious. The Jagddivision's operations in the area claimed 209 Allied aircraft destroyed, including only 35 transport aircraft. In return the Luftwaffe lost 192 fighters. The Allied operation failed, and the Luftwaffe survived into the following year.

During the Battle of the Bulge, the Luftwaffe undertook night bombing attacks against Bastogne. A paradrop and aerial re-supply of German spearheads failed completely. On 1 January 1945 the Luftwaffe undertook a final attack operation known as Operation Baseplate (Unternehmen Bodenplatte) against Allied airfields in the Netherlands and Belgium in a bid to establish air superiority and eliminate air attacks on the German forces in the Ardennes area.

Adolf Galland, who had replaced Werner Mölders as General der Jagdflieger protested as he had been carefully conserving the Luftwaffe's fighter strength for his 'Great Blow' against Allied Bombers in which over 800 fighters would be sent in massive attacks to cause devastating losses to Allied bombers, which he hoped would persuade the Allies to cease the bombing over Germany for a time. He along with others such as Johannes Steinhoff tried to persuade Hitler to remove Reichsmarschall Göring from command of the Luftwaffe, leading to the Fighter Pilots Revolt. They were dismissed and sent back to their front line units.

Correctly believing that a 1 January attack would catch the Allied airforces napping, the Luftwaffe destroyed many Allied aircraft on the ground but in return suffered crippling losses. The Germans lost 271 Bf 109 and Fw 190s destroyed or captured, and a further 65 damaged as well as 9 Ju 88's destroyed and a further 4 damaged. Pilot losses stood at 143 pilots killed, 70 as prisoners of war, and 21 wounded. The losses represented 25% of the attacking force. An estimated 3 Kommodore, 5 Kommandeure and 14 Staffelkapitäne were lost.

The operation had been so secret that the Luftwaffe failed to notify its front line anti-aircraft units resulting in many losses due to friendly fire. Of the remaining Luftwaffe pilots few had more than ten missions to their credit. The loss of twenty-two unit commanders was devastating, such men at this point were irreplaceable. The loss of such outstanding pilots caused a drop in morale and the loss of the guidance they gave to younger pilots.

In return for the crippling losses, it was first thought the Luftwaffe destroyed 232 Allied aircraft and damaged 156. Examination of Allied records shows that the figures were nearer 305 destroyed and 190 damaged. However, as the vast majority of these planes were destroyed on the ground, allied pilot losses were very light and the planes could be quickly replaced by the allies. The operation was a disaster for the Jagdwaffe. The Luftwaffe turned its attention to a revolutionary jet fighter in the Messerschmitt Me 262 Stormbird or Schwalbe (Swallow). While this aircraft could outrun any Allied aircraft, and had armament that could effectively destroy Allied bombers with a single 'burst' of fire, it was not produced in sufficient numbers to change the air war.

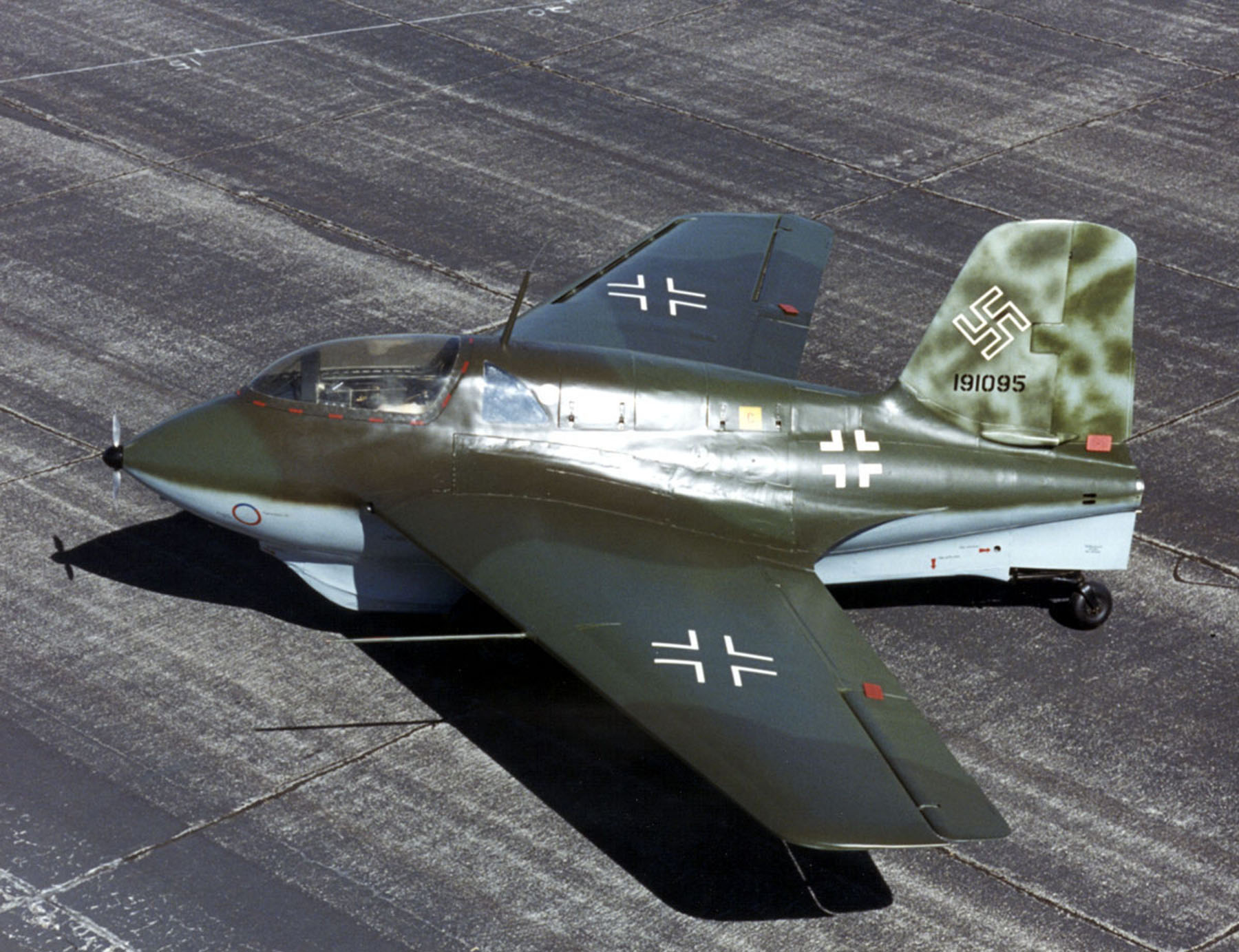
The Messerschmitt Me 163 Komet, was a German rocket-powered fighter aircraft.

The Luftwaffe continued to resist the Allied air assault over Germany proper, which had by March 1945, become the front line itself. In several missions during March the American bomber fleets reported attacks from large groups of German piston-engined and jet aircraft, sometimes numbering up to 150. The fuel shortages were now responsible for grounding the Jagdwaffe. Priority was given to jet units now operating the Messerschmitt Me 163 and Me 262.

Adolf Galland, formerly General der Jagdflieger and now in disgrace after the Fighter Pilots Revolt, formed Jagdverband 44 (JV 44). This unit was a special fighter force consisting of some of the top German fighter aces in the Luftwaffe which would fly the Messerschmitt Me 262 jet fighter.

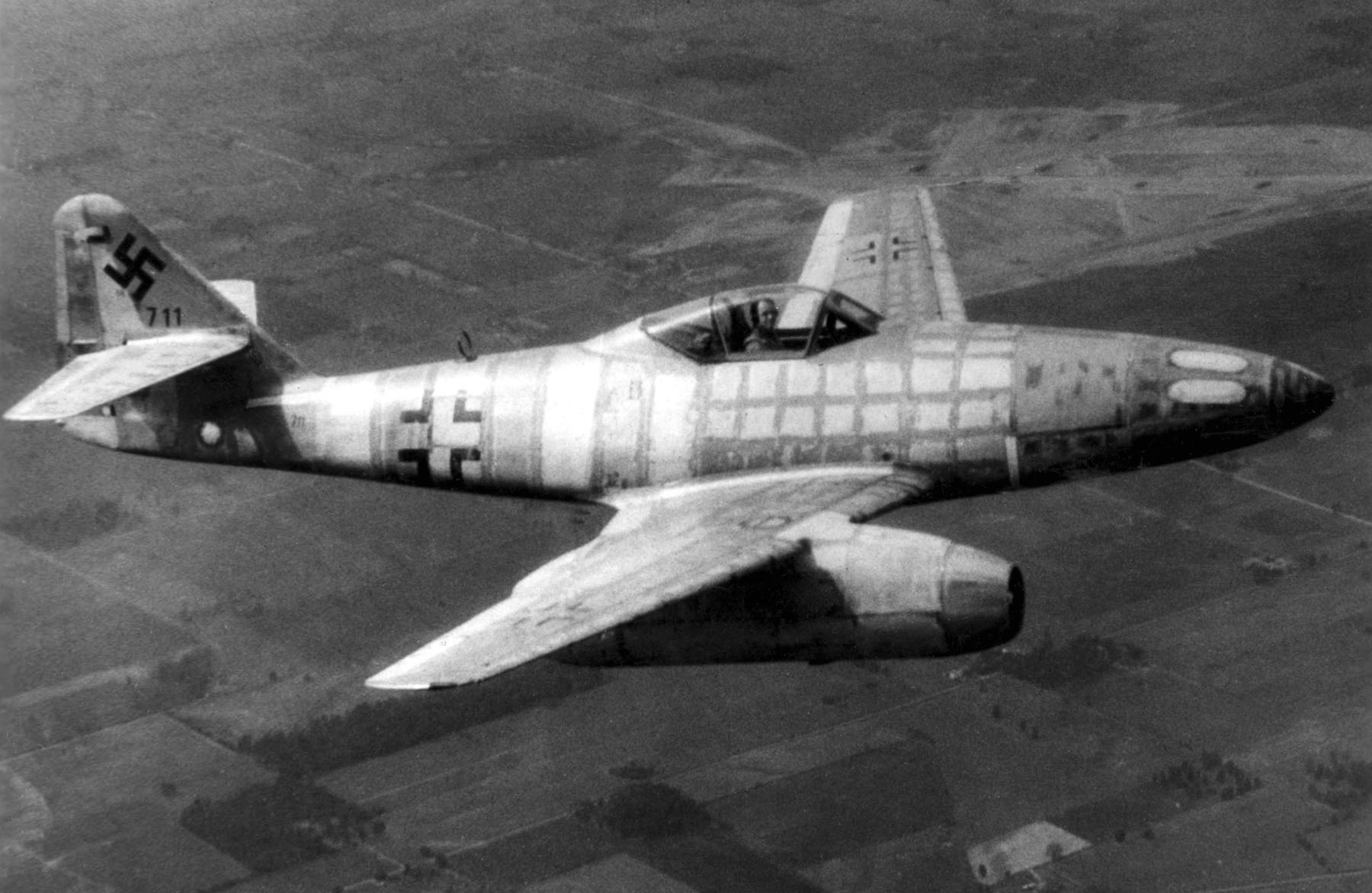
Messerschmitt Me 262 Schwalbe, the world's first operational jet fighter.

The unit was established in February 1945 . The flying personnel of the squadron were made up almost exclusively of high scoring aces, or Experten. The unit's top five aces alone had more than 1,000 victories. JV 44 defended southern Germany and Austria from aerial attack.

Because of the greater length of runway it required, and the slow acceleration it had at low speeds, the Me 262 was especially vulnerable during take-off and landing. The unit constructed a Protection Squadron (Platzschutzstaffel) headed by Lieutenant Heinz Sachsenberg to provide air cover for takeoffs and landings. This unit flew the long-nosed 'Dora', Fw 190 D, variant of the well-known Fw 190. These aircraft were painted bright red on their underbelly with contrasting white stripes so anti-aircraft batteries could distinguish them from Allied aircraft. The unit continued operations until the end of the war, Galland himself was wounded, after destroying a solitary Martin B-26 Marauder, when he was shot down by a Republic P-47 Thunderbolt.

By April, the German front in the west had disintegrated and in the east the Red Army had encircled Berlin. The Germans turned to desperate solutions like the Leonidas Squadron. The last battles fought in the skies over Germany were now insignificant. All but overrun, the mass surrender of German military personnel began. All that remained of the Luftwaffe were scattered wrecks over airfields that were virtually aircraft 'graveyards'. Many examples of the revolutionary aircraft that the Luftwaffe hoped would turn the tide fell into Allied hands, examples like the Me 262 and Heinkel He 162 greatly impressed the Allies.

== See also ==
- German Air Fleets in World War II
- High Command Trial
- List of German World War II jet aces
- List of German World War II night fighter aces
- List of World War II aces from Germany
- List of World War II military aircraft of Germany
- Luftwaffe serviceable aircraft strengths (1940–1945)
- The Bomber Command War Diaries
- Trial of Erhardt Milch
