= Luftwaffe serviceable aircraft strengths (1940–1945) =

Operational strength of the German air force

The following table summarizes the operational strength of the German air force, the Luftwaffe, by general category of aircraft.

The period covered is World War II from 1940 to 1945, starting at part way through of the Battle of Britain which started on 10 July, 1940 to near end of the war and the German unconditional surrender on 8 May, 1945.

Class:	17 August 1940	24 June 1941	27 July 1942	17 May 1943	31 May 1944	10 January 1945	9 April 1945
Single-engine fighters	787	898	945	980	1063	1469	1305
Twin-engine fighters	219	105	58	114	151	n/a	n/a
Night fighters	63	148	203	378	572	808	485
Fighter-bombers	119	124	40	216	278		
Anti-shipping aircraft						83	n/a
Ground attack aircraft	n/a	n/a	19	61	352	613	712
Dive-bombers	294	260	249	413	n/a	n/a	n/a
Night harassment aircraft	n/a	n/a	n/a	n/a	305	302	215
Twin-engine bombers	960	931	1119	1269	841		
Four-engine bombers	7	4	41	33	97		
Multi-engine bombers						294	37
Reconnaissance aircraft	185	282	188	215	153	176	143
Army cooperation aircraft	135	388	209	251	210	293	309
Coastal aircraft	162	76	64	149	123	60	45
Transport aircraft	226	212	365	414	719	269	10
Kampfgeschwader 200 (misc. aircraft)	n/a	n/a	n/a	n/a	65	206	70
Total:	3157	3428	3500	4493	4929	4573	3331

== See also ==
- Luftwaffe
- World War II

== References and links ==
- Price, Alfred (1997). The Luftwaffe Data Book. Greenhill Books. ISBN 1853672939.
