= Anton Hackl =

German Luftwaffe pilot (1915–1984)

- Hackl as a Major
- Born: 25 March 1915; Regensburg, German Empire
- Died: 10 July 1984 (aged 69); Regensburg, West Germany
- Military career
- Allegiance: Nazi Germany
- Branch: Reichsheer (1933–1935); Luftwaffe (1935–1945)
- Service years: 1933–1945
- Rank: Major (major)
- Nickname: Toni
- Units: JG 333, JG 77, JG 11, JG 76, JG 26, JG 300
- Commands: II./JG 26, JG 76, JG 11
- Conflicts: See battles World War II: Phoney War; Norwegian campaign; North African campaign; Operation Barbarossa; Defense of the Reich
- Awards: Knight's Cross of the Iron Cross with Oak Leaves and Swords

Anton "Toni" Hackl (25 March 1915 – 10 July 1984) was a German Luftwaffe military aviator during World War II, a fighter ace credited with 192 enemy aircraft shot down in over 1,000 combat missions. The majority of his victories were claimed over the Eastern Front, with 87 claims over the Western Front. Of his 87 victories over the Western Allies, at least 32 were four-engined bombers, a further 24 victories were unconfirmed.

Born in Regensburg, Hackl volunteered for military service in the Reichsheer in 1933. He transferred to the Luftwaffe (Air Force) in 1935 and following flight training, Hackl was posted to Jagdgeschwader 77 (JG 77–77th Fighter Wing) in April 1938. Following the outbreak of World War II, he flew his first combat missions during the winter 1939/40, a period dubbed the Phoney War. Hackl claimed four victories during the Norwegian Campaign and then flew missions on the Channel Front in aftermath of the Battle of Britain.

Hackl then fought in the aerial battles of Operation Barbarossa, the German invasion of the Soviet Union. On 29 July 1941, Hackl was appointed Staffelkapitän (squadron leader) of the 5. Staffel (5th squadron) of JG 77. He claimed 23 further aerial victories by the end of 1941, and following his 51st victory was awarded the Knight's Cross of the Iron Cross on 25 May 1942. He claimed his 100th victory on 3 August, and on 6 August, he was awarded the Knight's Cross of the Iron Cross with Oak Leaves following his 106th aerial victory. On 19 September 1942, Hackl claimed his 118th and last victory on the Eastern Front, and was then transferred to the North Africa, fighting in the Tunisia Campaign. Hackl claimed six aerial victories over North Africa before he was severely wounded on 4 February 1943. After a period of convalescence, Hackl was posted to III. Gruppe of Jagdgeschwader 11 (JG 11–11th Fighter Wing), fighting in Defense of the Reich. Appointed Gruppenkommandeur (group commander) of the III. Gruppe on 1 October 1943, Hackl was wounded in action again on 15 April 1944, at the time his total was 142 aerial victories. Back in action, following his 162nd victory, he was awarded the Knight's Cross of the Iron Cross with Oak Leaves and Swords on 13 July 1944. He died on 10 July 1984 in Regensburg.

== Early life and career ==
Hackl was born on 25 March 1915 in Regensburg, Upper Palatinate of the Kingdom of Bavaria, as part of the German Empire. He was the son of a master joiner. He joined the Reichswehr (Army of the Weimar Republic) in 1933, initially serving with 20. (Bayerisches) Infanterie-Regiment (20th Bavarian Infantry Regiment), subordinated to the 7. Division (7th Division).

In 1936, Hackl transferred to the newly formed Luftwaffe, initially serving as a driver. In 1937, holding the rank Obergefreiter (senior lance-corporal), Hackl was sent to Halberstadt where he received flight training. (Note: Flight training in the Luftwaffe progressed through the levels A1, A2 and B1, B2, referred to as A/B flight training. A training included theoretical and practical training in aerobatics, navigation, long-distance flights and dead-stick landings. The B courses included high-altitude flights, instrument flights, night landings and training to handle the aircraft in difficult situations.) There, he received his pilot license and was trained in aerobatics. He was promoted to Unteroffizier (staff sergeant) in 1937, received fighter pilot training, and in April 1938 was posted to the II. Gruppe (2nd group) of Jagdgeschwader 77 (JG 77–77th Fighter Wing), (Note: For an explanation of Luftwaffe unit designations see Organization of the Luftwaffe during World War II.) at the time under the command of Oberstleutnant (Lieutenant Colonel) Carl-Alfred Schumacher. In early 1938, II. Gruppe of JG 77 was known as Küstenjagdgruppe I./136 (Coastal Fighter Group). In October 1938, I./136 was renamed to II. Gruppe of Jagdgeschwader 333 (JG 333–333rd Fighter Wing). On 1 May 1939, the Gruppe was again renamed, and from then on, was referred to as II. Gruppe of JG 77.

== World War II ==
World War II in Europe began on Friday, 1 September 1939, when German forces invaded Poland. On the invasion day, Hackl was promoted to Feldwebel (staff sergeant) and did not participate in the Polish campaign. At the time, he attended an officers training course. Following officer training, Hackl was promoted to Oberleutnant (first lieutenant), effective as of 1 August 1940, bypassing the rank of Leutnant (second lieutenant). In the winter 1939/40, Hackl was back with II. Gruppe, flying combat air patrol missions along Germany's western border during the period dubbed the Phoney War. For this, he was awarded the Iron Cross Second Class (Eisernes Kreuz zweiter Klasse) on 6 March 1940. (Note: According to Stockert on 19 March 1940.)

=== Norwegian Campaign ===
By May 1940, Hackl was based in Norway, with JG 77 when he claimed his first aerial victory on 15 June 1940. That day, 5. Staffel flew from Stavanger-Sola and encountered a flight of Lockheed Hudson light bombers from the Royal Air Force (RAF) No. 233 Squadron. In the resulting aerial combat, Hackl claimed two Hudsons shot down, the first at 9:00 and the second at 9:02. The battleship Scharnhorst had been damaged in combat on 8 June 1940. Following preliminary repairs at Trondheim, Scharnhorst began its return voyage to Germany on 20 June. II. Gruppe of JG 77 had been tasked to provide fighter coverage for Scharnhorst. On 21 June, Scharnhorst came under two air attacks by six Swordfish torpedo bombers and nine Beaufort bombers. In this encounter, Hackl was credited with his third aerial victory, claiming a Beaufort shot down between 16:00 and 18:00. At 9:40 on 25 June, he shot down a No. 269 Squadron Hudson for his fourth aerial victory, but was also slightly wounded by the defensive fire. His opponent was Hudson (N7330) "C" of No. 269 Squadron piloted by Pilot Officer P.N. Trolove. His four aerial victories in Norway earned Hackl the Iron Cross First Class (Eisernes Kreuz erster Klasse) on 2 July 1940. (Note: According to Stockert on 6 August 1940.)

=== War against the Soviet Union ===
In July 1941 he was posted with JG 77 to the Eastern Front, supporting Generalfeldmarschall (Field Marshal) Gerd von Rundstedt's Heeresgruppe Süd (Army Group South), with the objective of capturing Ukraine and its capital Kiev. On 29 July 1941, Hackl was appointed Staffelkapitän of 5. Staffel, replacing Hauptmann Erich Friedrich. Hackl claimed his first victory on the Eastern Front, and fifth overall, on 1 August 1941. Operating from an airfield at Kishinev, II. Gruppe flew missions in the vicinity of Grigoriopol, on the eastern bank of the river Dniester. That day, Hackl flew an escort fighter mission for Kampfgeschwader 27 (KG 27–27th Bomber Wing), claiming a Polikarpov I-16 fighter aircraft shot down.

By the end of 1941, his number of aerial victories had increased to 26. Hackl became an "ace-in-a-day" for the first time on 19 April 1942, claiming two Mikoyan-Gurevich MiG-3, two Polikarpov R-Z and one I-18 shot down over the Isthmus of Perekop. His score increased further, and by May 1942, after 51 victories he received the Knight's Cross of the Iron Cross (Ritterkreuz des Eisernen Kreuzes). During the month of July 1942, Hackl claimed 37 enemy aircraft shot down in the aerial battles around Voronezh, including 6 victories in a day on both 21 and 23 July. In August 1942, he claimed 14 further victories which included his 100th claim on 3 August. He was the 16th Luftwaffe pilot to achieve the century mark.

Following his 106th aerial victory, he was awarded the Knight's Cross of the Iron Cross with Oak Leaves (Ritterkreuz des Eisernen Kreuzes mit Eichenlaub) on 7 August 1942. He was the 109th member of the German armed forces to be so honored. Hackl and together with Oberfeldwebel Franz-Josef Beerenbrock were presented the Oak Leaves by Adolf Hitler at the Führerhauptquartier at Rastenburg. He claimed his last victory on the Eastern Front on 5 September 1942. On 7 November, II. Gruppe received orders to immediately transfer to the Mediterranean theater.

=== North Africa ===
The first elements of II. Gruppe arrived in North Africa on 5 December where it was based at Zarzur airfield, approximately 15 km (9.3 mi) west of Tripoli. Hackl's 5. Staffel arrived in North Africa on 18 December, initially based at Tripoli and then moved to Zarzur. On 20 December 1942, Hackl claimed two victories over North Africa. That day, 5. Staffel encountered a flight of Curtiss P-40 Kittyhawk ground-attack aircraft. In the encounter, 5. Staffel claimed five aerial victories, two by Hackl. The opponents were P-40s from the RAF No. 260 Squadron which lost five aircraft that day.

In combat with P-38 Lightnings escorting a flight of 24 Boeing B-17 Flying Fortress' on 4 February 1943, he was badly wounded resulting in a forced landing in his Bf 109 G-2 trop (Werknummer 10787—factory number) near Matmata. His injuries to the head and right hand turned out to be severe. He was flown to Rome and was hospitalized for several months. Command of 5. Staffel was passed on to Oberleutnant Franz Hrdlicka.

=== Defense of the Reich ===
Returning to duties in September 1943, Hackl next operated with III. Gruppe of Jagdgeschwader 11 (JG 11–11th Fighter Wing) on Reichsverteidigung (Defense of the Reich) duties. On 1 October, he became Gruppenkommandeur (group commander) III. Gruppe of JG 11, succeeding Hauptmann Ernst-Günther Heinze. On 11 January, the United States Army Air Forces (USAAF) VIII Bomber Command, later renamed Eighth Air Force, attacked German aircraft manufacturing at Halberstadt, Magdeburg, Oschersleben and Braunschweig. In total 663 heavy bombers, escorted by 592 fighter aircraft were dispatched. III. Gruppe engaged the USAAF bombers in the area west of Hildesheim. In this encounter, Hackl claimed two B-17 bombers shot down. Hackl went on to claim 25 four-engined heavy bombers shot down during his time with III. Gruppe, including three Consolidated B-24 Liberator bombers shot down on 18 March 1944 taking his total to 139 aerial victories. In April 1944, he briefly acted as commander of JG 11, replacing Oberstleutnant Hermann Graf who had been wounded in combat on 29 March.

On 15 April 1944, Hackl was shot down in his Focke-Wulf Fw 190 A and wounded in combat with USAAF Republic P-47 Thunderbolts, grounding him for a period of convalescence. During this period, he was promoted to Major (major) on 1 May 1944. On 30 May 1944, he was replaced by Hauptmann Horst-Günther von Fassong as Gruppenkommandeur of III. Gruppe. Following additional training at the Verbandsführerschule of the General der Jagdflieger, a training school for unit leaders, Hackl was appointed Geschwaderkommodore (Wing Commander) of Jagdgeschwader 76 (JG 76–76th Fighter Wing).

The authors Prien and Rodeike describe Hackl as a tough and ruthless unit commander. According to an Ultra deciphered message sent by Hackl to the General der Jagdflieger on 20 May, he had made recommendations on how to best utilize the young and inexperienced new fighter pilots in combat. His suggestions included attacking the bomber formations from the rear, driving the attack to point-blank range, and threatening the new pilots with court-martial if they did not follow these orders. Hackl received the Knight's Cross of the Iron Cross with Oak Leaves and Swords (Ritterkreuz des Eisernen Kreuzes mit Eichenlaub und Schwertern) on 12 July for 162 aerial victories.

The Geschwaderstab (headquarters unit) of JG 76 was formed on 21 July at Rotenburg an der Wümme and equipped with factory new Bf 109 G-6 aircraft. On 23 August, transferred to Athies-sous-Laon in France where it replaced the Geschwaderstab of Jagdgeschwader 3 (JG 3–3rd Fighter Wing). There, Hackl's command included III. Gruppe of JG 76 and III. Gruppe of JG 3 and initially was subordinated to the 5. Jagd Division (5th Fighter Division). His command flew combat missions in the area of the Seine near Rouen. On 28 August, the Geschwaderstab was forced to retreat to Azannes-et-Soumazannes where it came under the control of the 4. Jagd Division (4th Fighter Division). At Azannes-et-Soumazannes, the airfield came under a strafing attack, losing five aircraft in the attack. On 31 August, the Geschwaderstab was ordered to Wiesbaden-Erbenheim Airfield and to Freiburg im Breisgau on 5 September where it again came under control of the 5. Jagd Division. There the Geschwaderstab was reequipped with the Fw 190 A-8. On 7 October, Hackl transferred command of JG 76 to Major Ernst Düllberg.

On 8 October, he succeeded Hauptmann Georg-Peter Eder as Gruppenkommandeur of II. Gruppe of Jagdgeschwader 26 "Schlageter" (JG 26–26th Fighter Wing) with 165 victories to his credit. In late-November, II. Gruppe was withdrawn from combat operations and moved to Reinsehlen Airfield for conversion training to the new inline engine powered Fw 190 D-9, the second unit to receive this aircraft. Following the conversion training, II. Gruppe flew its first combat mission on 23 December. Scrambled to intercept an USAAF bomber formation, the flight encountered a flight of 27 Avro Lancaster bombers and three De Havilland Mosquito aircraft. During this aerial encounter, Hackl claimed his 167th aerial victory.

By the end of the year he now had 172 victories. On 29 January 1945, he was appointed Geschwaderkommodore of Jagdgeschwader 300 (JG 300–300th Fighter Wing). He was succeeded by Oberleutnant Waldemar Radener as commander of II. Gruppe of JG 26. In late February, he was appointed Geschwaderkommodore of JG 11, succeeding Major Jürgen Harder who was killed in a flying accident. His last 24 victories were never officially confirmed. On 3 May 1945, two JG 11 pilots, Leutnant Hermann Gern and Feldwebel Franz Keller, attempted to steal a Messerschmitt Bf 108 Taifun aircraft to desert and fly to southern Germany. Too outspoken, the two were denounced and arrested. Gern and Keller were court-martialed and sentenced to death. A number of non-commissioned officers of JG 11 spoke to Hackl on behalf of Keller, no attempt was made to save Gern. While Keller was pardoned, Gern was executed by firing squad on 7 May.

He was shot down eight times and wounded four times. Anton Hackl died on 10 July 1984 in Regensburg.

== Summary of career ==
=== Aerial victory claims ===
According to US historian David T. Zabecki, Hackl was credited with 192 aerial victories. Bergström and Mikhailov state that Hackl flew about 1,000 combat missions and also list him with shooting down 192 enemy aircraft plus another 24 unconfirmed aerial victories. Of this figure, 105 victories were claimed while serving on the Eastern Front and 87 on the Western Front. Among these numbers are 34 four-engined bombers which puts him in second place behind Georg-Peter Eder as the leading daylight bomber claimant. Mathews and Foreman, authors of Luftwaffe Aces – Biographies and Victory Claims, researched the German Federal Archives and state that Hackl was credited with more than 180 aerial victories. This figure includes at least 103 claims made on the Eastern Front and 44 on the Western Front, including at least 16 four-engined bombers.

=== Awards ===
- Wound Badge in Gold
- Front Flying Clasp of the Luftwaffe in Gold with Pennant "1000"
- Combined Pilots-Observation Badge
- "Afrika" Cuff title
- Crimea Shield
- Iron Cross (1939)
  - 2nd Class (6 March 1940)
  - 1st Class (2 July 1940)
- Knight's Cross of the Iron Cross with Oak Leaves and Swords
  - Knight's Cross on 25 May 1942 as Oberleutnant and Staffelkapitän of the 5./Jagdgeschwader 77
  - 109th Oak Leaves 9 August 1942 as Hauptmann and Staffelkapitän of the 5./Jagdgeschwader 77 (Note: According to Scherzer on 7 August 1942.)
  - 78th Swords on 9 July 1944 as Major and Gruppenkommandeur of the III./Jagdgeschwader 11 (Note: According to Scherzer on 12 July 1944.)

== Notes ==
Military offices
Preceded by Oberstleutnant Hermann Graf	Acting commander of Jagdgeschwader 11; April 1944 – April 1944	Succeeded by Major Herbert Ihlefeld
Preceded by Major Jürgen Harder	Commander of Jagdgeschwader 11; 8 May 1944 – 20 February 1945	Succeeded by none
Preceded by none	Commander of Jagdgeschwader 76; 21 July 1944 – 7 October 1944	Succeeded by Major Ernst Düllberg
Preceded by Major Kurd Peters	Acting commander of Jagdgeschwader 300 Wilde Sau; 30 January 1945 – 20 February 1945	Succeeded by Major Kurd Peters
