= Max Stotz =

German fighter ace and Knight's Cross recipient (1912–1943)

- Stotz as an Oberfeldwebel
- Born: 13 February 1912; Mannswörth, Lower Austria, Austria-Hungary
- Died: 19 August 1943 (aged 31) (MIA); Last seen near Kirov, Byelorussian SSR, Soviet Union
- Military career
- Allegiance: First Austrian Republic (1933–1934); Federal State of Austria (1934–1938); Nazi Germany (1938–1943)
- Branch: Austrian Armed Forces (1933–1938); Luftwaffe (1938–1943)
- Service years: 1933–1943
- Rank: Hauptmann (Captain)
- Units: JG 76, JG 54
- Commands: 5./JG 54
- Conflicts: See battles World War II: Invasion of Poland; Battle of France; Battle of Britain; Operation Barbarossa
- Awards: Knight's Cross of the Iron Cross with Oak Leaves

Max Stotz (13 February 1912 – 19 August 1943) was an Austrian Luftwaffe military aviator during World War II, a fighter ace credited with shooting down 189 enemy aircraft claimed in more than 700 combat missions.

Born in Mannswörth, Stotz volunteered for military service in the Austrian Army in 1933. In 1935, he transferred to the Austrian Air Force and following the Anschluss, Austria's annexation into Nazi Germany, he served in the German Luftwaffe, initially with Jagdgeschwader 76 (JG 76—76th Fighter Wing) and later with Jagdgeschwader 54 (JG 54—54th Fighter Wing). He flew his first combat missions in the Invasion of Poland and claimed his first aerial victory during the "Phoney War" period on the Western Front. Following his 53rd aerial victory he was awarded the Knight's Cross of the Iron Cross, the highest award in the military and paramilitary forces of Nazi Germany during World War II, on 19 June 1942 and the Knight's Cross of the Iron Cross with Oak Leaves on 30 October 1942 after 100 victories.

In early August 1943, Stotz was appointed Staffelkapitän (squadron leader) of the 5. Staffel (5th squadron) of JG 54. Stotz was posted as missing in action after aerial combat near Vitebsk on 19 August 1943. He was promoted to Hauptmann (captain) posthumously.

== Early life and career ==
Stotz was born on 13 February 1912 in Mannswörth, at the time in Austria-Hungary. He was the son of a farmer and joined the military service in the Austrian Army (Bundesheer) on 7 April 1933. He initially served as a Gebirgsjäger with Alpenjäger-Regiment 11 in Klagenfurt. In 1935, he requested transfer to the Austrian Air Force (Österreichische Luftstreitkräfte) and was transferred to Flieger-Regiment 2 in Graz. There, from 1 July to 23 November 1936, he was trained as a pilot. From 24 November 1936 to 5 May 1938, Stotz served with Flieger-Regiment 1 at Wiener Neustadt. At Wiener Neustadt, he was a member of the aerobatics squadron in 1937/38. Following the Anschluss, Austria's annexation into Nazi Germany on 12 March 1938, Stotz was accepted into the German Luftwaffe and became a pilot with 1. Staffel (1st squadron) of Jagdgeschwader 76 (JG 76—76th Fighter Wing), a squadron of I. Gruppe (1st group) under the command of Oberleutnant Dietrich Hrabak.

== World War II ==
World War II in Europe began on Friday 1 September 1939 when German forces invaded Poland. I. Gruppe of JG 76 participated in the invasion and returned to its home airfield at Wien-Aspern where it remained until end of October. On 26 October, the Gruppenstab and 1. Staffel were ordered to Frankfurt Rhein-Main where it was united again with 2. and 3. Staffel on 2 November. From Frankfurt Rhein-Main, the Gruppe flew fighter protection during the "Phoney War" for the Frankfurt, Rhine and Saar region. On 5 November, Stotz received the Iron Cross 2nd Class (Eisernes Kreuz zweiter Klasse). The next day, he claimed his first aerial victory over a Royal Air Force (RAF) Bristol Blenheim bomber near Völklingen. In April 1940, I. Gruppe moved to an airfield at Mainz-Finthen, originally named Fliegerhorst Ober-Olm. The Gruppe stayed at Ober-Olm until the Battle of France began.

On 11 May, I. Gruppe moved from Ober-Olm to Wengerohr, present-day a suburb of Wittlich. From Wengerohr, the unit flew combat air patrols in the area of Montmédy, Charleville-Mézières and Bastogne. On 14 May, I. Gruppe flew combat missions over the Meuse and Sedan area during the Battle of Sedan. In this action, Stotz claimed two Fairey Battle light bombers shot down over the Sedan combat area. Following the German advance into France, I. Gruppe was moved to an airfields at Bastogne and Nives on 15 May. On 19 May, Stotz claimed a Potez 63 and a Morane-Saulnier M.S.406 west of Laon. This earned him the Iron Cross 1st Class (Eisernes Kreuz erster Klasse), awarded to him on 1 June 1940. On 21 May, I. Gruppe moved to Charleville from where the unit flew missions in the Battle of Dunkirk. On 3 June, I. Gruppe participated in Operation Paula (Unternehmen Paula), an offensive operation to destroy the remaining units of the Armée de l'Air. That day, Stotz claimed the destruction of a Curtiss P-36 Hawk fighter west of Épernay. Three days later, he claimed two further Curtiss fighters northwest of Amiens. The Gruppe was moved to Conteville on 7 June, to Guise on 16 June, and then to Émerainville on 18 June. On 19 June, I. Gruppe was withdrawn from France and moved to Brussels on 22 June.

On 26 June 1940, I. Gruppe of JG 76 was moved to the airfield at Waalhaven in the Netherlands and subordinated to Jagdgeschwader 54 (JG 54—54th Fighter Wing). There, the Gruppe was tasked with providing aerial protection over the Dutch coastal area. On 5 July, I./JG 76 was officially integrated into JG 54 and was renamed to II./JG 54. Three days later, Stotz claimed his last aerial victory on the Western Front over a Blenheim bomber south of Rotterdam. He was awarded the Honor Goblet of the Luftwaffe (Ehrenpokal der Luftwaffe) on 20 September 1940.

On 29 March 1941, II./JG 54 was withdrawn from the English Channel and was ordered to Graz-Thalerhof. There the various squadrons were split up with 4. Staffel being subordinated to III. Gruppe of Jagdgeschwader 77 (JG 77—77th Fighter Wing) and ordered to Deta in Romania. On 6 April, 4. Staffel flew combat missions in the Invasion of Yugoslavia. The next day, the Staffel flew combat air patrols on the Hungarian-Yugoslavian border. On 9 April, II./JG 54 was united again at Kecskemét, Hungary and returned to Deta on 11 April. The Gruppe was withdrawn from this theater on 19 April and ordered to an airfield at Zemun near Belgrade.

=== Operation Barbarossa ===
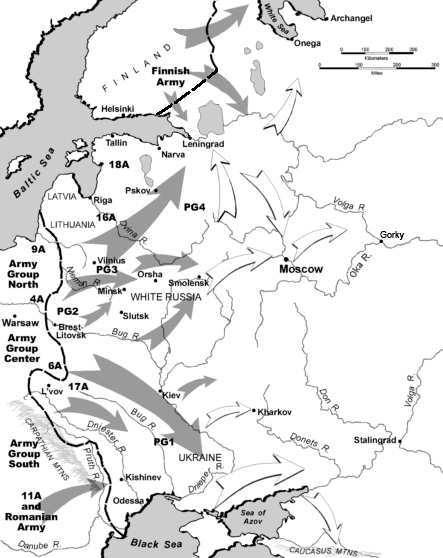
Map indicating Operation Barbarossa's attack plan

Following the surrender of the Royal Yugoslav Army on 17 April 1941, JG 54 received orders on 3 May 1941 to turn over all Bf 109-Es so they could receive the new Bf 109-F variant. Transition training was completed at Airfield Stolp-Reitz in Pomerania. Following intensive training, the Geschwader was moved to airfields in Eastern Prussia. II. Gruppe under command of Hauptmann Hrabak was moved to Trakehnen on 20 June 1941. The Wehrmacht launched Operation Barbarossa, the invasion of the Soviet Union, on 22 June with II. Gruppe supporting Army Group North in its strategic goal towards Leningrad.

On 25 June, II. Gruppe was moved to an airfield at Kowno and was tasked with providing fighter escort for Panzer Group 4 advancing towards the Düna river. The next day, Stotz claimed his first aerial victory in this theater of operations over a Tupolev SB-2 bomber in the vicinity of Ostrov.

=== Eastern Front ===
On 7 August 1942, Stotz flew one of ten Bf 109s escorting a formation of Junkers Ju 88 bombers from Kampfgeschwader 3 (KG 3—3rd Bomber Wing) attacking the Soviet 6th and 8th Tank Corps at Sychyovka when they were intercepted by eight Yakovlev Yak-1 fighters from 32 IAP (32nd Fighter Aviation Regiment). In this encounter, Stotz claimed two Yak-1s shot down. On 16 August 1942, Stotz for the first time encountered the unknown to him Lavochkin La-5 fighter aircraft from 49 IAP (49th Fighter Aviation Regiment). That day, he claimed two aerial victories which were misidentified and filed as a Lavochkin-Gorbunov-Gudkov LaGG-3 and a Curtiss P-40 Warhawk.

On 29 October 1942, Stotz was credited with his 100th aerial victory. He was the 29th Luftwaffe pilot to achieve the century mark. The next day, he was awarded the Knight's Cross of the Iron Cross with Oak Leaves (Ritterkreuz des Eisernen Kreuzes mit Eichenlaub) for this achievement. He was the 137th member of the German armed forces to be so honored. The presentation was made by Adolf Hitler personally. On this account, he was also promoted to Leutnant (second lieutenant), backdated to 1 October 1942. On 30 December 1942, Stotz claimed 10 aerial victories, bringing his total to 129. On 12 January 1943, Soviet forces launched Operation Iskra, also known as the second battle of Lake Ladoga, an operation which created a corridor into the besieged city Leningrad. Defending against this operation, Stotz claimed his 150th aerial victory on 26 January when he was credited with five Lavochkin-Gorbunov-Gudkov LaGG-3 fighters and a single Yak-1 fighter shot down in the area of Mga and Shlisselburg.

Stotz was promoted to Oberleutnant (first lieutenant) on 1 February 1943. On 21 February, Stotz flew as wingman of his Gruppenkommandeur (group commander), Major Hans Hahn. During this mission, Hahn's aircraft suffered engine failure resulting in a forced landing behind enemy lines. Hahn was captured and taken prisoner of war. Stotz was appointed Staffelkapitän (squadron leader) of 5. Staffel of JG 54 on 10 August 1943. He succeeded Leutnant Emil Lang who had temporarily led the Staffel after Oberleutnant Alfred Teumer had been transferred in July. Following aerial combat on 19 August 1943 with a large formation of Yakovlev Yak-9 fighters in the vicinity of Vitebsk, Stotz bailed out of his Focke-Wulf Fw 190 A-6 (Werknummer 550 201—factory) 12 kilometres (7.5 miles) north of Kirov and went missing in action. He was last seen drifting down over Soviet held territory. Command of 5. Staffel was then again given to Leutnant Lang.

== Summary of career ==
=== Aerial victory claims ===
According to US historian David T. Zabecki, Stotz was credited with 189 aerial victories. Spick also list him with 189 aerial victories claimed in over 500 combat missions, and a mission-to-claim ratio of 2.65. Mathews and Foreman, authors of Luftwaffe Aces — Biographies and Victory Claims, researched the German Federal Archives and found documentation for 182 aerial victory claims, plus one further unconfirmed claim. This number includes 174 on the Eastern Front and 8 on the Western Front.

Victory claims were logged to a map-reference (PQ = Planquadrat), for example "PQ 28123". The Luftwaffe grid map (Jägermeldenetz) covered all of Europe, western Russia and North Africa and was composed of rectangles measuring 15 minutes of latitude by 30 minutes of longitude, an area of about 360 square miles (930 km^{2}). These sectors were then subdivided into 36 smaller units to give a location area 3 km × 4 km (1.9 mi × 2.5 mi) in size.

Chronicle of aerial victories
This and the ♠ (Ace of spades) indicates those aerial victories which made Stotz an "ace-in-a-day", a term which designates a fighter pilot who has shot down five or more airplanes in a single day. This and the ? (question mark) indicates information discrepancies listed by Prien, Stemmer, Rodeike, Bock, Mathews and Foreman.
| Claim | Date | Time | Type | Location | Claim | Date | Time | Type | Location |
– 1. Staffel of Jagdgeschwader 76 – "Phoney War" — 1 September 1939 – 9 May 1940
| 1? (Note: According to Mathews and Foreman this claim is unconfirmed.) | 6 November 1939 | — | Blenheim | Völklingen | | | | | |
– 1. Staffel of Jagdgeschwader 76 – Battle of France — 10 May – 25 June 1940
| 2 | 14 May 1940 | 16:15 | Battle | Sedan | 6 | 3 June 1940 | 15:20 | Curtiss | west of Épernay |
| 3 | 14 May 1940 | 16:15 | Battle | Sedan | 7 | 6 June 1940 | 21:00 | Curtiss | northwest of Amiens |
| 4 | 19 May 1940 | 14:15 | Potez 63 | | 8 | 6 June 1940 | 21:00 | Curtiss | northwest of Amiens |
| 5 | 19 May 1940 | 18:30 | M.S.405 | west of Laon | | | | | |
– 4. Staffel of Jagdgeschwader 54 – At the Channel and over England — 26 June 1940 – 29 March 1941
| 9 | 8 July 1940? (Note: According to Mathews and Foreman claimed on 20 July 1940.) | 14:10 | Blenheim | south of Rotterdam | | | | | |
– 4. Staffel of Jagdgeschwader 54 – Operation Barbarossa — 22 June – 5 December 1941
| 10 | 26 June 1941 | 20:15 | SB-2 | vicinity of Ostrov | 19 | 19 August 1941 | 18:00 | I-16 | |
| 11 | 8 July 1941 | 02:53 | I-15 | Ostrov | 20 | 27 August 1941 | 05:55 | I-18 (MiG-1) | |
| 12 | 23 July 1941 | 09:00 | I-18 (MiG-1) | | 21 | 9 September 1941 | 10:10 | I-18 (MiG-1) | |
| 13 | 11 August 1941 | 15:40 | I-16 | | 22 | 10 September 1941 | 12:45 | I-18 (MiG-1) | |
| 14 | 13 August 1941 | 09:25 | I-16 | | 23 | 11 September 1941 | 10:45 | I-18 (MiG-1) | |
| 15 | 13 August 1941 | 18:25 | I-16 | | 24 | 14 September 1941? (Note: According to Mathews and Foreman claimed on 12 September 1941.) | 09:05 | I-18 (MiG-1) | |
| 16 | 15 August 1941 | 14:35 | I-18 (MiG-1) | | 25 | 14 September 1941 | 18:00 | I-18 (MiG-1) | |
| 17 | 18 August 1941 | 10:50 | DB-3 | | 26 | 16 September 1941 | 07:15 | I-18 (MiG-1) | |
| 18 | 18 August 1941 | 10:58 | I-18 (MiG-1) | | 27 | 25 October 1941 | 15:55 | I-16 | |
– 4. Staffel of Jagdgeschwader 54 – Eastern Front — 20 January – 30 April 1942
| 28 | 23 February 1942 | 15:18 | I-18 (MiG-1) | | 38 | 1 April 1942 | 18:10 | I-18 (MiG-1) | |
| 29 | 23 February 1942 | 15:20 | I-18 (MiG-1) | | 39 | 1 April 1942 | 18:12 | I-18 (MiG-1) | |
| 30 | 26 February 1942 | 12:30 | Pe-2 | | 40 | 16 April 1942 | 09:50 | LaGG-3 | |
| 31 | 12 March 1942 | 13:40 | P-40 | | 41 | 19 April 1942 | 06:40 | LaGG-3 | |
| 32 | 12 March 1942 | 13:42 | I-16 | | 42 | 19 April 1942 | 06:50 | Yak-1 | |
| 33 | 14 March 1942 | 17:44? (Note: According to Mathews and Foreman claimed at 17:40.) | Il-2 | | 43 | 19 April 1942 | 14:15 | Yak-1 | |
| 34 | 15 March 1942 | 11:10 | I-18 (MiG-1) | | 44 | 21 April 1942 | 16:58 | Yak-1 | |
| 35 | 20 March 1942 | 14:30 | I-16 | | 45 | 30 April 1942 | 07:40 | Yak-1 | |
| 36 | 29 March 1942 | 16:50 | I-18 (MiG-1) | | 46 | 30 April 1942 | 13:45 | Yak-1 | |
| 37 | 1 April 1942 | 10:25 | P-40 | | | | | | |
– 4. Staffel of Jagdgeschwader 54 – Eastern Front — 1 May 1942 – 3 February 1943
| 47 | 9 May 1942 | 15:50 | Yak-1 | | 99 | 26 October 1942 | 08:41 | LaGG-3 | PQ 28123; 35 km (22 mi) northwest of Demyansk |
| 48 | 12 May 1942 | 08:45 | LaGG-3 | | 100 | 29 October 1942 | 07:28 | LaGG-3 | PQ 29792; 45 km (28 mi) north of Demyansk |
| 49 | 15 May 1942 | 10:10 | LaGG-3 | | 101 | 3 December 1942 | 12:30 | Yak-1 | PQ 2814 |
| 50 | 29 May 1942 | 10:25 | MiG-3 | | 102♠ | 3 December 1942 | 07:25 | Il-2 | PQ 18234; 30 km (19 mi) east-southeast of Staraya Russa |
| 51 | 4 June 1942 | 12:25 | LaGG-3 | | 103♠ | 3 December 1942 | 10:42? (Note: According to Mathews and Foreman claimed at 10:43.) | La-5 | PQ 18251; 25 km (16 mi) southeast of Staraya Russa |
| 52 | 4 June 1942 | 12:27 | LaGG-3 | | 104♠ | 3 December 1942 | 10:45 | La-5 | PQ 18263; 30 km (19 mi) east-southeast of Staraya Russa |
| 53 | 7 June 1942 | 08:10 | Il-2 | | 105♠ | 3 December 1942 | 13:50 | La-5 | PQ 28231; 15 km (9.3 mi) northwest of Demyansk |
| 54 | 2 August 1942 | 16:20 | I-16 | PQ 00154; 10 km (6.2 mi) south of Leningrad | 106♠ | 3 December 1942 | 13:58 | Il-2 | PQ 28124; 35 km (22 mi) northwest of Demyansk |
| 55 | 4 August 1942 | 15:50 | Yak-1 | PQ 29781; 45 km (28 mi) north-northwest of Demyansk | 107 | 6 December 1942 | 11:38 | LaGG-3 | PQ 18261; 30 km (19 mi) east-southeast of Staraya Russa |
| 56 | 4 August 1942 | 15:51 | Yak-1 | PQ 29751; 20 km (12 mi) southwest of Arensburg | 108 | 6 December 1942 | 12:23 | LaGG-3? (Note: According to Mathews and Foreman claimed as a Lavochkin La-5.) | PQ 29783; 55 km (34 mi) north of Demyansk |
| 57 | 4 August 1942 | 15:53 | Yak-1 | PQ 29723; 60 km (37 mi) northeast of Staraya Russa | 109 | 12 December 1942 | 13:52? (Note: According to Mathews and Foreman claimed at 14:00 as a Lavochkin La-5.) | Il-2? | PQ 18234; 45 km (28 mi) north-northwest of Demyansk |
| 58 | 7 August 1942 | 16:10 | Yak-1 | PQ 4626 | 110 | 12 December 1942 | 13:57 | LaGG-3 | PQ 28116; 40 km (25 mi) northwest of Demyansk |
| 59 | 7 August 1942 | 16:12 | Yak-1 | PQ 4626 | 111 | 12 December 1942 | 13:58 | LaGG-3 | PQ 29773; 40 km (25 mi) east-northeast of Staraya Russa |
| 60 | 9 August 1942 | 10:15 | Pe-2 | PQ 4786; 20 km (12 mi) east-southeast of Zubtsov | 112 | 25 December 1942 | 10:41 | P-39 | PQ 28141; 30 km (19 mi) northwest of Demyansk |
| 61 | 9 August 1942 | 10:17 | Pe-2 | PQ 4734; 45 km (28 mi) north-northwest of Rzhev | 113 | 25 December 1942 | 10:43 | P-39 | PQ 28173; 25 km (16 mi) west-northwest of Demyansk |
| 62 | 9 August 1942 | 10:18 | LaGG-3 | PQ 4787; 15 km (9.3 mi) south of Zubtsov | 114 | 25 December 1942 | 10:45 | P-39 | PQ 18292; 40 km (25 mi) southeast of Staraya Russa |
| 63 | 10 August 1942 | 13:40 | LaGG-3? | PQ 47593; 20 km (12 mi) south of Staritsa | 115♠ | 29 December 1942 | 09:17 | LaGG-3 | PQ 28342; 20 km (12 mi) west of Demyansk |
| 64 | 10 August 1942 | 13:41 | LaGG-3? | PQ 47523; 5 km (3.1 mi) west of Rzhev | 116♠ | 29 December 1942 | 09:36? (Note: According to Mathews and Foreman claimed at 09:30.) | LaGG-3 | PQ 28133; 20 km (12 mi) northwest of Demyansk |
| 65 | 10 August 1942 | 13:42 | LaGG-3? | PQ 47533; 15 km (9.3 mi) north-northeast of Rzhev | 117♠ | 29 December 1942 | 11:40 | LaGG-3 | PQ 29761; 55 km (34 mi) north of Demyansk |
| 66 | 10 August 1942 | 14:15 | Il-2 | PQ 46254; 15 km (9.3 mi) northeast of Konaja | 118♠ | 29 December 1942 | 11:45 | LaGG-3 | PQ 28112; 40 km (25 mi) northwest of Demyansk |
| 67 | 11 August 1942 | 06:41? (Note: According to Mathews and Foreman claimed at 06:40.) | LaGG-3 | PQ 47842; 10 km (6.2 mi) south of Zubtsov | 119♠ | 29 December 1942 | 11:47 | LaGG-3 | PQ 28112; 40 km (25 mi) northwest of Demyansk |
| 68 | 11 August 1942 | 07:40 | LaGG-3 | PQ 47593 north of Rzhev | 120♠ | 30 December 1942 | 08:50 | LaGG-3 | PQ 18262; 30 km (19 mi) east-southeast of Staraya Russa |
| 69 | 11 August 1942 | 07:43 | LaGG-3 | PQ 47592 north of Rzhev | 121♠ | 30 December 1942 | 08:51 | LaGG-3 | PQ 18161; 30 km (19 mi) northwest of Demyansk |
| 70 | 16 August 1942 | 07:38 | LaGG-3 | west of Flolowskoje west of Grolovskoye | 122♠ | 30 December 1942 | 08:52 | LaGG-3 | PQ 18133; 40 km (25 mi) northwest of Demyansk |
| 71 | 16 August 1942 | 07:41 | P-40 | PQ 55874; 15 km (9.3 mi) southeast of Sukhinichi | 123♠ | 30 December 1942 | 08:54 | LaGG-3 | PQ 28111; 40 km (25 mi) northwest of Demyansk |
| 72 | 16 August 1942? (Note: According to Mathews and Foreman claimed on 19 August 1942.) | 13:45 | P-40 | PQ 54162; 25 km (16 mi) south of Sukhinichi | 124♠ | 30 December 1942 | 08:56 | LaGG-3 | PQ 29771; 40 km (25 mi) east-southeast of Staraya Russa |
| 73 | 16 August 1942? | 13:47 | P-40 | PQ 54134; 20 km (12 mi) south of Sukhinichi | 125♠ | 30 December 1942 | 11:48? (Note: According to Mathews and Foreman claimed at 11:40.) | LaGG-3 | PQ 18261; 20 km (12 mi) southwest of Valday |
| 74♠ | 22 August 1942 | 07:30 | MiG-3 | PQ 64172 vicinity of Belyov | 126♠ | 30 December 1942 | 13:45 | Il-2 | PQ 28173; 35 km (22 mi) northwest of Demyansk |
| 75♠ | 22 August 1942 | 07:35 | MiG-3 | PQ 64172 vicinity of Belyov | 127♠ | 30 December 1942 | 13:47 | LaGG-3 | PQ 18261; 30 km (19 mi) east-southeast of Staraya Russa |
| 76♠ | 22 August 1942 | 07:38 | Pe-2 | PQ 64174 vicinity of Belyov | 128♠ | 30 December 1942 | 13:49 | LaGG-3 | PQ 28141; 30 km (19 mi) northwest of Demyansk |
| 77♠ | 22 August 1942 | 15:40 | Yak-1 | PQ 64171 vicinity of Belyov | 129♠ | 30 December 1942 | 13:55 | LaGG-3 | PQ 39582; 60 km (37 mi) east-northeast of Staraya Russa |
| 78♠ | 22 August 1942 | 15:45 | Yak-1 | PQ 64143; 10 km (6.2 mi) north of Belyov | 130 | 6 January 1943 | 07:50 | P-40 | PQ 28112; 40 km (25 mi) northwest of Demyansk |
| 79 | 23 August 1942 | 07:00 | Yak-1 | PQ 54264; 15 km (9.3 mi) west-northwest of Belyov | 131 | 6 January 1943 | 07:51 | P-40 | PQ 28113; 40 km (25 mi) northwest of Demyansk |
| 80 | 23 August 1942 | 07:03 | P-40 | PQ 54262; 15 km (9.3 mi) west-northwest of Belyov | 132 | 6 January 1943 | 07:52 | LaGG-3 | PQ 28121; 35 km (22 mi) northwest of Demyansk |
| 81 | 23 August 1942 | 13:05 | Yak-1 | PQ 5442; 25 km (16 mi) southwest of Belyov | 133 | 6 January 1943 | 07:53 | LaGG-3 | PQ 28121; 35 km (22 mi) northwest of Demyansk |
| 82 | 23 August 1942 | 13:08 | Yak-1 | PQ 54284; 25 km (16 mi) west of Belyov | 134♠ | 14 January 1943 | 10:35 | La-5 | PQ 10194 east of Mga |
| 83 | 24 August 1942 | 16:35 | Yak-1 | PQ 54261; 15 km (9.3 mi) west-northwest of Belyov | 135♠ | 14 January 1943 | 10:36 | La-5 | PQ 10193 east of Mga |
| 84 | 27 August 1942 | 09:12? (Note: According to Mathews and Foreman claimed at 09:17.) | Yak-1 | PQ 47593 north of Rzhev | 136♠ | 14 January 1943 | 10:37 | La-5 | PQ 10193 east of Mga |
| 85 | 1 September 1942 | 07:24 | LaGG-3 | PQ 10164, Putilowo | 137♠ | 14 January 1943 | 10:38 | La-5 | PQ 10192 east of Mga |
| 86 | 15 September 1942 | 11:12 | Yak-1 | PQ 28114; 40 km (25 mi) northwest of Demyansk | 138♠ | 14 January 1943 | 12:10 | La-5 | PQ 10241; 25 km (16 mi) east-southeast of Mga |
| 87 | 15 September 1942 | 11:13 | Yak-1 | PQ 28121; 35 km (22 mi) northwest of Demyansk | 139♠ | 14 January 1943 | 12:11 | La-5 | PQ 10253; 30 km (19 mi) west-southwest of Shlisselburg |
| 88 | 22 September 1942 | 13:25 | LaGG-3 | PQ 28153; 25 km (16 mi) north of Demyansk | 140♠ | 14 January 1943 | 12:12 | La-5 | PQ 10194 east of Mga |
| 89 | 22 September 1942 | 14:00? (Note: According to Mathews and Foreman claimed at 14:08.) | P-40 | PQ 29293 | 141 | 15 January 1943 | 11:15 | Yak-1 | PQ 00234; 10 km (6.2 mi) west of Shlisselburg |
| 90 | 25 September 1942 | 17:50 | P-40 | PQ 28221; 30 km (19 mi) north-northeast of Demyansk | 142 | 25 January 1943 | 09:44 | La-5 | PQ 10152 southeast of Shlisselburg |
| 91 | 4 October 1942 | 13:55 | LaGG-3 | PQ 3875 | 143 | 25 January 1943 | 09:45 | La-5 | PQ 10148 south of Shlisselburg |
| 92 | 5 October 1942 | 07:00? (Note: According to Mathews and Foreman claimed at 07:05.) | LaGG-3 | PQ 3859 | 144 | 25 January 1943 | 09:48 | LaGG-3 | PQ 10161 southeast of Shlisselburg |
| 93 | 5 October 1942 | 07:45 | LaGG-3 | PQ 3864 | 145♠ | 26 January 1943 | 10:57 | LaGG-3 | PQ 10112 vicinity of Shlisselburg |
| 94 | 6 October 1942 | 12:35 | LaGG-3 | PQ 38551; 25 km (16 mi) north-northeast of Ostashkov | 146♠ | 26 January 1943 | 10:59 | Yak-1 | PQ 10151 southeast of Shlisselburg |
| 95 | 6 October 1942 | 13:00 | Yak-1 | PQ 38632; 40 km (25 mi) west-southwest of Vyshny Volochyok | 147♠ | 26 January 1943 | 11:25 | LaGG-3 | PQ 10171; Mga |
| 96 | 7 October 1942 | 10:12 | Yak-1 | PQ 3853 | 148♠ | 26 January 1943 | 14:00 | LaGG-3 | PQ 11773; Lake Ladoga |
| 96? (Note: According to Mathews and Foreman this claim is listed as Stotz's 96th aerial victory. However, Prien, Stemmer, Rodeike and Bock do not list this claim.) | 21 October 1942 | 13:28 | Il-2 | 15 km (9.3 mi) north of Staraya Russa | 149♠ | 26 January 1943 | 14:01? (Note: According to Mathews and Foreman claimed at 14:03.) | LaGG-3 | PQ 10111 vicinity of Shlisselburg |
| 97 | 23 October 1942 | 16:25 | LaGG-3 | PQ 28211; 30 km (19 mi) north-northeast of Demyansk | 150♠ | 26 January 1943 | 14:05 | LaGG-3 | PQ 11773; Lake Ladoga |
| 98 | 26 October 1942 | 08:36 | LaGG-3 | PQ 28131; 30 km (19 mi) north of Demyansk | 151 | 27 January 1943 | 10:42 | LaGG-3 | PQ 10712; 25 km (16 mi) south of Lyuban |
– 4. Staffel of Jagdgeschwader 54 – Eastern Front — February 1943
| 152 | 9 February 1943 | 10:10 | La-5 | PQ 36 Ost 10161 southeast of Shlisselburg | 157 | 11 February 1943 | 10:06 | P-40 | PQ 36 Ost 00273; 15 km (9.3 mi) northeast of Pushkin |
| 153 | 9 February 1943 | 10:12 | La-5 | PQ 36 Ost 10123 east of Shlisselburg | 158 | 19 February 1943 | 11:52 | Il-2 | PQ 35 Ost 28354; 10 km (6.2 mi) west of Demyansk |
| 154 | 9 February 1943 | 13:12 | P-40 | PQ 36 Ost 00421; Pushkin-Mga | 159 | 19 February 1943 | 11:54 | Il-2 | PQ 35 Ost 28441; 10 km (6.2 mi) east of Demyansk |
| 155 | 11 February 1943 | 09:51? (Note: According to Mathews and Foreman claimed at 13:15.) | P-40 | PQ 36 Ost 00281; 20 km (12 mi) west of Mga | 160 | 21 February 1943 | 09:11 | La-5 | PQ 35 Ost 18464; 30 km (19 mi) west of Demyansk |
| 156 | 11 February 1943 | 09:54 | LaGG-3 | PQ 36 Ost 00282; 20 km (12 mi) west of Mga | 161 | 21 February 1943 | 09:12 | La-5 | PQ 35 Ost 18463; 30 km (19 mi) west of Demyansk |
– 5. Staffel of Jagdgeschwader 54 – Eastern Front — May – 19 August 1943
| 162 | 21 May 1943 | 15:27 | I-153 | PQ 35 Ost 21883 | 173 | 5 June 1943 | 11:50 | Yak-7 | PQ 36 Ost 10333; 20 km (12 mi) east-southeast of Mga |
| 163 | 21 May 1943 | 19:07 | LaGG-3 | PQ 35 Ost 20231 | 174 | 5 June 1943 | 11:51 | Yak-7 | PQ 36 Ost 10411; 25 km (16 mi) east-southeast of Mga |
| 164 | 22 May 1943 | 11:01 | La-5 | PQ 36 Ost 10414; 25 km (16 mi) east-southeast of Mga | 175 | 21 June 1943 | 10:20 | LaGG-3 | PQ 36 Ost 10142 south of Shlisselburg |
| 165 | 22 May 1943 | 11:07 | La-5 | PQ 36 Ost 10442; 30 km (19 mi) southeast of Mga | 176 | 21 June 1943 | 10:22 | LaGG-3 | PQ 36 Ost 10113 vicinity of Shlisselburg |
| 166 | 26 May 1943 | 19:50 | LaGG-3 | PQ 36 Ost 10123 east of Shlisselburg | 177 | 9 August 1943 | 16:00 | LaGG-3 | PQ 35 Ost 54583; 25 km (16 mi) northeast of Karachev |
| 167 | 26 May 1943 | 19:52 | LaGG-3 | PQ 36 Ost 10152 southeast of Shlisselburg | 178 | 11 August 1943 | 18:35 | LaGG-3 | PQ 35 Ost 45751; 5 km (3.1 mi) northwest of Kirov |
| 168 | 26 May 1943 | 19:55 | LaGG-3 | PQ 36 Ost 10142 south of Shlisselburg | 179 | 12 August 1943 | 07:53 | LaGG-3 | PQ 35 Ost 45754; 5 km (3.1 mi) west of Kirov |
| 169 | 30 May 1943 | 20:00 | LaGG-3 | PQ 36 Ost 11892; 20 km (12 mi) northeast of Leningrad | 180 | 12 August 1943 | 07:56 | LaGG-3 | PQ 35 Ost 45753; 5 km (3.1 mi) north of Kirov |
| 170 | 30 May 1943 | 20:01 | LaGG-3 | PQ 36 Ost 11892; 30 km (19 mi) northwest of Shlisselburg | 181 | 15 August 1943 | 16:04 | LaGG-3 | PQ 35 Ost 44693; 20 km (12 mi) north-northwest of Karachev |
| 171 | 30 May 1943 | 20:25 | P-40 | PQ 36 Ost 10161 southeast of Shlisselburg | 182 | 15 August 1943 | 16:05 | LaGG-3 | PQ 35 Ost 44694; 20 km (12 mi) north-northwest of Karachev |
| 172 | 1 June 1943 | 16:05 | LaGG-3 | PQ 36 Ost 20121 west of Volkhov | | | | | |

=== Awards ===
- Iron Cross (1939)
  - 2nd Class (5 November 1939)
  - 1st Class (1 June 1940)
- Honour Goblet of the Luftwaffe (Ehrenpokal der Luftwaffe) (28 September 1940)
- German Cross in Gold on 1 December 1941 as Oberfeldwebel in the 4./Jagdgeschwader 54
- Knight's Cross of the Iron Cross with Oak Leaves
  - Knight's Cross on 19 June 1942 as Oberfeldwebel and pilot in the 5./Jagdgeschwader 54
  - 137th Oak Leaves on 30 October 1942 as Oberfeldwebel and pilot in the 5./Jagdgeschwader 54

== See also ==
- List of people who disappeared
