= Ernst Düllberg =

German flying ace (1913–1984)

- Born: 28 March 1913; Unna, Germany
- Died: 27 July 1984 (aged 71); Essen, Germany
- Military career
- Allegiance: Nazi Germany
- Branch: Luftwaffe
- Service years: 1936–1945
- Rank: Major (major)
- Units: JG 3, JG 27, JG 76, EJG 2, JG 7
- Conflicts: World War II: Western Front; Eastern Front
- Awards: Knight's Cross of the Iron Cross

Ernst Düllberg (28 March 1913 – 27 July 1984) was a former German Luftwaffe fighter ace and recipient of the Knight's Cross of the Iron Cross during World War II. Ernst Düllberg was credited with 45 victories in 650 combat missions, 36 over Western Front and 9 victories over the Eastern Front.

== Career ==
Düllberg was born on 28 March 1913 in Unna, at the time in the Province of Westphalia within the German Empire. In mid-1936, he joined the military service of the Luftwaffe. In November 1937, Düllberg attended the flight school in Celle. (Note: Flight training in the Luftwaffe progressed through the levels A1, A2 and B1, B2, referred to as A/B flight training. A training included theoretical and practical training in aerobatics, navigation, long-distance flights and dead-stick landings. The B courses included high-altitude flights, instrument flights, night landings and training to handle the aircraft in difficult situations.) In August 1939, he was posted to the 2. Staffel (2nd squadron) of Ergänzungs-Jagdgruppe Merseburg, a supplementary training unit stationed at Merseburg, where newly trained fighter pilots received instruction from pilots with combat experience. There, Düllberg served as an instructor. In July 1940, he was transferred to Jagdgeschwader 27 (JG 27—27th Fighter Wing) where he was assigned to 8. Staffel. On 1 August, Düllberg shot down the Bristol Blenheim bomber R2774 from the Royal Air Force (RAF) No. 236 Squadron.

=== Battle of Britain and squadron leader ===
On 5 August 1940, II. Gruppe (2nd group) of JG 27 was ordered to an airfield at Crépon, France for combat in the Battle of Britain. During this battle, JG 27 was subordinated to the VIII. Fliegerkorps (8th Air Corps). On 8 August, the Gruppenkommandeur (group commander) Hauptmann Werner Andres was shot down. Although rescued, his injuries prevented him from leading the Gruppe. In consequence, Düllberg was briefly put in command until Hauptmann Wolfgang Lippert officially assumed command on 4 September. In parallel, Düllberg was also appointed Staffelkapitän (squadron leader) of 5. Staffel of JG 27. He replaced Hauptmann Albrecht von Ankum-Frank who had been killed in a crash landing on 2 August. On 18 August, also known as the Hardest Day, Düllberg led the Gruppe on a Junkers Ju 87 dive bomber escort mission to Thorney Island. Near the Isle of Wight, the flight was intercepted by two squadrons of Hawker Hurricane fighters, shortly after Supermarine Spitfire engaged too. During this encounter, I. Gruppe of Sturzkampfgeschwader 77 (StG 77—77th Dive Bomber Wing) suffered heavy losses while Düllberg claimed one of the Hurricanes shot down.

=== North African Campaign ===
Following the withdrawal from the Eastern Front, II. Gruppe arrived at Döberitz, located approximately 10 kilometers (6.2 miles) west of Staaken, on 24 July. Here, the Gruppe was equipped with the Messerschmitt Bf 109 F-4 and prepared for combat in the North African campaign. On 24 September, 5. Staffel under command of Düllberg began the relocation, arriving at Ayn al-Ġazāla on 1 October. Düllberg claimed his first aerial victory in North Africa on 5 October. That day, 5. Staffel deployed to a makeshift airfield near Gambut, flying multiple missions from Gambut before returning to Ayn al-Ġazāla that evening. At 09:20, Düllberg led a flight of three Bf 109s on a combat air patrol to Sidi Omar where they engaged in aerial combat with four Hurricanes. During this melee, Düllberg claimed one of two Hurricane fighters shot down. The Hurricanes belonged to the RAF No. 33 Squadron. Both pilots were captured and taken prisoner of war. On 22 October, Düllberg shot down the Curtiss P-40 Tomahawk AN230 from the South African Air Force (SAAF) 2 Squadron. The pilot, Lieutenant Denis Hubert Byrne Sturman was killed in action. In preparation for Operation Crusader, Allied air operations targeted the Axis supply lines into North Africa and the airfields in the Cyrenaica. On 12 November, 5. Staffel engaged in aerial combat with P-40s in the area between Sollum and Bardia, claiming three aerial victories, one of which by Düllberg. Allied units lost five aircraft that day, a P-40 belonging to the SAAF 4 Squadron, a Hurricane of the SAAF 40 Squadron, two Hurricanes of the Royal Australian Air Force (RAAF) No. 451 Squadron, and a Hurricane from the No. 2 Photographic Reconnaissance Unit.

On 22 November 1941, Düllberg was wounded in aerial combat south of Sidi Rezegh resulting in a forced landing in his Bf 109 F-4 trop (Werknummer 8466—factory number). After the war it was established that Düllberg's aircraft was hit by Alan Rawlinson. His Bf 109 was hit in the cockpit. Although severely injured, Düllberg flew his damaged aircraft back to the airfield at Ayn al-Ġazāla. He was immediately flown to Athens on a Junkers Ju 52. He was then sent on home-leave for further treatment and a period of convalescence. Düllberg returned to his unit in early February 1942.

=== Adjutant and group commander ===
On 20 May 1942, Düllberg was succeeded by Oberleutnant Ernst Börngen as commander of 5. Staffel of JG 27. Düllberg was then transffered and made Geschwaderadjutant, the adjutant to the wing commander of JG 27 on 26 May. He held this position until 16 October 1942. On 11 October, Düllberg was appointed Gruppenkommandeur of III. Gruppe of JG 27. He succeeded Hauptmann Erhard Braune who was transferred.

=== Wing commander ===
On 30 September 1944, Düllberg was appointed Geschwaderkommodore (wing commander) of Jagdgeschwader 76 (JG 76—76th Fighter Wing). Command of III. Gruppe of JG 27 was then temporarily transferred to Oberleutnant Franz Stigler. Command of JG 76 was transferred from Major Anton Hackl on 7 October. In mid-October, JG 76 was transferred from Freiburg to the southeastern sector of the Eastern Front and placed under the command of Luftflotte 4 (Air Fleet 4).

== Later life ==
Düllberg died on 27 July 1984 at the age of 71 in Essen, West Germany.

== Summary of career ==
=== Aerial victory claims ===
According to Obermaier, Düllberg was credited with 45 aerial victories claimed in approximately 650 combat missions. This figure includes nine aerial victories on the Eastern Front and 36 over the Western Allies, including ten four-engined bombers. Mathews and Foreman, authors of Luftwaffe Aces — Biographies and Victory Claims, researched the German Federal Archives and states that he was credited 43 aerial victory claims, plus four further unconfirmed claims. This figure includes nine aerial victories on the Eastern Front and another 34 on the Western Front, including nine four-engined bombers.

Victory claims were logged to a map-reference (PQ = Planquadrat), for example "PQ 94 Ost N/AU". The Luftwaffe grid map (Jägermeldenetz) covered all of Europe, western Russia and North Africa and was composed of rectangles measuring 15 minutes of latitude by 30 minutes of longitude, an area of about 360 square miles (930 km^{2}). These sectors were then subdivided into 36 smaller units to give a location area 3 km × 4 km (1.9 mi × 2.5 mi) in size.

Chronicle of aerial victories
This and the – (dash) indicates unconfirmed aerial victory claims for which Düllberg did not receive credit. This and the ? (question mark) indicates information discrepancies listed by Prien, Stemmer, Rodeike, Bock, Mathews and Foreman.
Claim	Date	Time	Type	Location	Unit	Claim	Date	Time	Type	Location	Unit
– Claims with III. Gruppe of Jagdgeschwader 27 – On the Channel Front – 26 June – August 1940
1? (Note: According to Mathews and Foreman this claim is unconfirmed.)	1 August 1940	16:45	Blenheim	vicinity of Cherbourg	8./JG 27						
– Claims with II. Gruppe of Jagdgeschwader 27 – On the Channel Front – August – 10 November 1940
2	18 August 1940	15:27	Hurricane	Selsey Bill	5./JG 27	5	30 September 1940	17:50	Hurricane	London	5./JG 27
3	30 August 1940	12:15	Spitfire	Ashford	5./JG 27	6	7 October 1940	14:45	Hurricane	London	5./JG 27
—	6 September 1940	—	Spitfire		5./JG 27	—	28 October 1940	—	Spitfire		5./JG 27
4	27 September 1940	10:17	Hurricane	Biggin Hill	5./JG 27						
– Claims with II. Gruppe of Jagdgeschwader 27 – Operation Barbarossa – 22 June – 19 July 1941
7	25 June 1941	12:31	DB-3	southwest of Vilnius	5./JG 27						
– Claims with II. Gruppe of Jagdgeschwader 27 – In North Africa — September 1941 – 20 May 1942
8	5 October 1941	09:40	Hurricane	north of Sidi Omar	5./JG 27	12	12 February 1942	13:25	Hurricane	10–15 km (6.2–9.3 mi) north of Tobruk	5./JG 27
9	22 October 1941	12:00	P-40	east of Sidi Omar	5./JG 27	— ? (Note: This unconfirmed claim is not listed by Prien, Stemmer, Rodeike and Bock.)	27 March 1942	—	P-40		5./JG 27
10	12 November 1941	15:44	P-40	east-northeast of Bardia	5./JG 27	13	11 April 1942	10:54	P-40	east-southeast of Sidi-el-Mansur	5./JG 27
11	9 February 1942	09:58	P-40	southeast of Martuba	5./JG 27	14	20 April 1942	11:55	P-40	8 km (5.0 mi) south of Gambut	5./JG 27
– Claims with the Stab of Jagdgeschwader 27 – In North Africa — 26 May – 16 October 1942
15	13 July 1942	18:48	Hurricane	12 km (7.5 mi) southwest of El Alamein	Stab/JG 27						
– Claims with III. Gruppe of Jagdgeschwader 27 – In North Africa — 16 October – November 1942
16	20 October 1942	09:25	P-46	east of El Dabaa	Stab III./JG 27	17	25 October 1942	08:40	P-46	northwest of El Alamein	Stab III./JG 27
– Claims with III. Gruppe of Jagdgeschwader 27 – Mediterranean theater — February – December 1943
18	28 September 1943	16:08	Spitfire	30 km (19 mi) south of Kardamaina	Stab III./JG 27	23	6 December 1943	12:55	B-17	west of Milos	Stab III./JG 27
19	30 September 1943	14:40	Walrus	Strait of Leros	Stab III./JG 27	24	13 December 1943	08:18	Baltimore	south of Georgios	Stab III./JG 27
20	5 October 1943	12:55	B-24	15 km (9.3 mi) west of Lidoriki	Stab III./JG 27	25	14 December 1943	10:55	B-17	east of Tatoi	Stab III./JG 27
21	14 November 1943	13:35	Beaufighter	northeast of Leros	Stab III./JG 27	26	20 December 1943	12:39	B-17	Eleusis	Stab III./JG 27
22	16 November 1943	12:30	Beaufighter	east of Levitha	Stab III./JG 27	27	20 December 1943	12:50	B-17	north-northwest of Megara	Stab III./JG 27
– Claims with III. Gruppe of Jagdgeschwader 27 – Defense of the Reich — 1 March – 6 June 1944
28	2 April 1944	10:34	B-24	southwest of Wolfsberg	Stab III./JG 27	31	24 May 1944	10:15	B-24	40 km (25 mi) north of Bruck an der Mur	Stab III./JG 27
29	23 April 1944	13:40	B-24	west of Veszprém	Stab III./JG 27	32	29 May 1944	09:50	B-24	30 km (19 mi) southeast of Markersdorf	Stab III./JG 27
30	12 May 1944	12:35	B-17	50 km (31 mi) northeast of Frankfurt	Stab III./JG 27						
– Claims with III. Gruppe of Jagdgeschwader 27 – In defense of the Normandy Invasion — 6 June – 30 September 1944
33	10 June 1944	14:30	P-47	northeast of Lisieux	Stab III./JG 27	35	17 August 1944	19:07	Typhoon	PQ 94 Ost N/AU, vicinity of Flers	Stab III./JG 27
34	6 July 1944	06:25	P-47	25 km (16 mi) northeast of Lisieux	Stab III./JG 27	36	18 August 1944	19:25	P-51	5 km (3.1 mi) west of Laigneville	Stab III./JG 27
– Claims with the Stab of Jagdgeschwader 76 – Eastern Front — November 1944 – May 1945
37	4 November 1944	14:45	Yak-9		Stab JG 76						
According to Mathews and Foreman, his last seven aerial victories claimed on the Eastern Front were not documented.

=== Awards ===
- Iron Cross (1939) 2nd and 1st Class
- German Cross in Gold on 16 January 1944 as Major in the III./Jagdgeschwader 27
- Knight's Cross of the Iron Cross on 27 July 1944 as Major and Gruppenkommandeur of the III./Jagdgeschwader 27

== Notes ==
Military offices
Preceded by Major Anton Hackl	Commander of Jagdgeschwader 76; 7 October 1944 – March 1945	Succeeded by none
