= Zerstörergeschwader 76 =

- Active: 1 May 1939 – September 1944
- Country: Nazi Germany
- Branch: Luftwaffe
- Type: Heavy fighter
- Role: Air superiority Offensive counter air Close air support Surgical strike
- Size: Wing
- Engagements: World War II

Commanders
- Notable commanders: Walter Grabmann

Insignia
- Identification symbol: Geschwaderkennung of M8

Aircraft flown
- Fighter: Messerschmitt Bf 109; Messerschmitt Bf 110; Messerschmitt Me 410

Zerstörergeschwader 76 (ZG 76) was a Zerstörer (heavy fighter; lit. "destroyer") geschwader (wing) of the German Luftwaffe during World War II. The wing operated the Messerschmitt Bf 109 in the early phases of World War II, then the Messerschmitt Bf 110 for the duration of the war.

Created in 1939 based on the Zerstörer concept advocated by Hermann Göring, commander-in-chief of the Luftwaffe, the wing was only partially equipped with the Bf 110. Some units were designated Jagdgruppe 76 and flew the Messerschmitt Bf 109 during the Phoney War. Those elements (gruppen, or groups) that operated the Bf 110 fought in the Invasion of Poland in September 1939 which began World War II. Thereafter, ZG 76 fought in the Battle of the German Bight in December 1939 which encouraged RAF Bomber Command to switch to night bombing. In April 1940 it supported the German invasion of Denmark and fought in the Norwegian Campaign. From May to October 1940 ZG 76 served in the Battle of Belgium, Battle of France and Battle of Britain. Elements of the wing fought in the German invasion of Yugoslavia, Battle of Greece and Battle of Crete. The majority of the gruppen were disbanded in late 1941 after serving in the early stages of the Defence of the Reich by defending the German-occupied Low Countries.

In 1943 ZG 76 was reformed. The Oberkommando der Luftwaffe felt the heavy fighters could be successful against the unescorted United States Army Air Force bombers. The introduction of long-range US fighter escorts in 1944 resulted in heavy casualties and operations were scaled down until the final disbandment of ZG 76 in September 1944. The remaining pilots were transferred to the Bf 109 wing Jagdgeschwader 76.

== Formation ==
Zerstörergeschwader 76 was formed on 1 May 1939 from Zerstörergeschwader 144. I. Gruppe and II. Gruppe formed without a Geschwaderstab. The II. Gruppe was initially equipped with the Messerschmitt Bf 109 and was known as Jagdgruppe 176, while it retained its heavy fighter identity officially, then re-equipped with the Messerschmitt Bf 110 over the winter, 1939/40. The organisation and equipment of the Zerstörergeschwader units was typical at this time. Zerstörergeschwader 26 (ZG 26—26th Destroyer Wing) was operated and organised in a similar fashion.

The Geschwaderstab was created on 15 April 1940 in Köln-Wahn. The III. Gruppe was raised on 26 June 1940 in Trier-Euren with the Messerschmitt Bf 110.

== World War II ==
=== Invasion of Poland and Phoney War ===
On 1 September 1939 the German Wehrmacht invaded Poland beginning World War II in Europe. ZG 76 operated with one gruppe during the campaign. I./ZG 76 was based at Gablingen under the command of 6. Fliegerdivision (6th Air Division). Approximately 100 Bf 110s were combat ready for action in Poland indicating a shortfall in production. A ratio of one rotte [flight] per kampfstaffel [bomber squadron] had to suffice.

Alexander Löhr, commanding Luftflotte 4, regarded the destruction of the Polish Air Force of such importance he ordered Wolfram Freiherr von Richthofen's air command to attack airfields near Kraków. I./ZG 76 was ordered to provide fighter escort for bombers from I. and III. Gruppe of Kampfgeschwader 4 (KG 4—4th Bomber Wing) and I. and III. Gruppe of Kampfgeschwader 77 (KG 77—77th Bomber Wing). The attacks on these airfields involved 150 sorties. KG 4 dropped 200 tons of bombs on 1 September. The group claimed 19 Polish fighters destroyed. Future German fighter pilots Wolfgang Falcke, Helmut Lent and Gordon Gollob made claims in aerial combat. I./ZG 76 provided effective protection to Kampfgeschwader 27 (KG 27—27th Bomber Wing) on its long-range bombing missions.

Other heavy fighter units claimed victories as well; I.(Z) Gruppe of Lehrgeschwader 1 (LG 1—1st Demonstration Wing) claimed wildly optimistic total of 34 Polish fighters shot down, while Zerstörergeschwader 2 (ZG 2—2nd Destroyer Wing) claimed 78 in the air and 50 on the ground. The true losses of Colonel Stefan Pawlikowski's Pursuit Brigade were 10 fighters destroyed and 24 "unserviceable" [presumably meaning damaged]; 62 percent of its strength. Total German losses across Poland was 25 aircraft. The Polish loss percentage increased to 72 percent by the 5 September.

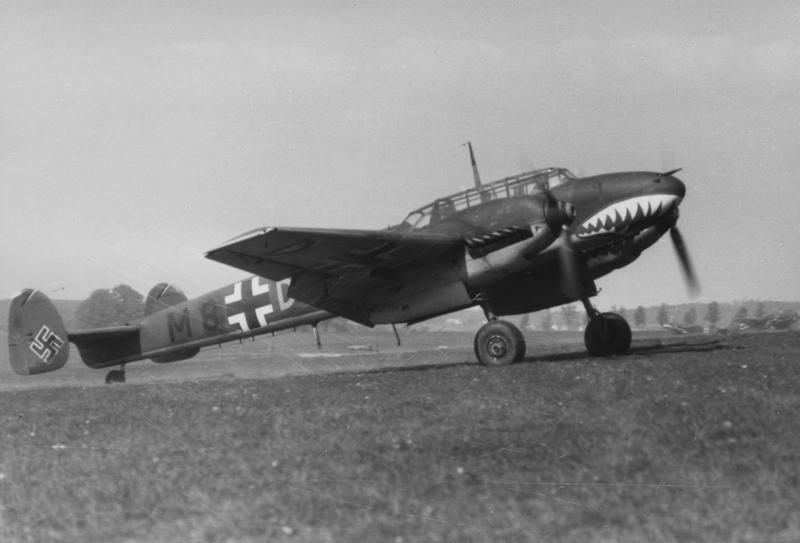
A ZG 76 Bf 110C with "sharks mouth" nose paint

On 2 September I./ZG 76, led by Lent, claimed 11 aircraft at Dęblin, while KG 4 dropped 180 tonnes of bombs in 13 staffeln-sized operations. The aircraft destroyed were not frontline aircraft, but were from training units. Later in the day the gruppe was credited with nine Łódź Army fighters, attached to protect the Polish army on the approaches to Warsaw. Only three were actually lost. The survivors, however, lost five to Bf 109s to JGr 102. The Pursuit Brigade was transferred to an unspecified sector giving Luftwaffe bombers a free hand. The cost of the air battle to ZG 76 was three Bf 110s.

On 3 September the Zerstörergruppen escorted bombers attacking the PZL P.11 factory in Warsaw. They claimed three of the 40 defending fighters losing one. From 4 September Polish aerial resistance had been reduced, and consequently were ordered to conduct a larger number of close air support operations. I./ZG 76 was temporarily transferred to Ulrich Grauert's 1. Fliegerdivision and fought in the Battle of Iłża from 9 September.

After the Polish capitulation following the Soviet Invasion of Poland on 17 September 1939, ZG 76 reorganised in the Phoney War period. II. and III./ZG 76 finally were able to convert from the Bf 109 to Bf 110 and shed their Jadggruppe designations. ZG 76 flew protection patrols (Defence of the Reich) over the German North Sea coast in late 1939. Elements of it took part in the Battle of the Heligoland Bight on 18 December 1939 and the wing claimed five Vickers Wellington bombers shot down. RAF losses were 12 bombers destroyed, three damaged and 57 men killed, though German claims were far higher.

=== Norwegian campaign ===
On 9 April 1940, German forces began Operation Weserübung, an invasion of Denmark and Norway. X Fliegerkorps was allocated to the operation, which was conducted in cooperation with the German Army and the Kriegsmarine. The air corps was commanded by Generalleutnant Hans Ferdinand Geisler. Only I./ZG 76 from the wing participated based at airstrips near Westerland. 3. Staffel of Zerstörergeschwader 1 (ZG 1—1st Destroyer Wing) was attached to it. The immediate objective was to secure airfields in northern Denmark to secure the air space and communications links to the Norwegian capital Oslo from Royal Navy intervention. The German invasion of Denmark was carried out in the space of 24 hours. 1./ZG 76 assisted in the seizure of Aalborg airport on the northern Danish coast granting air superiority over the Skagerrak. Signallers, ground crews, clerks and essential equipment was flown in by Junkers Ju 52s from KGzbV 1. II./KGzbV 1 flew to Oslo Airport, Fornebu to land soldiers and Fallschirmjäger battalions. Lent and 1./ZG 76 gave air cover. The staffel claimed one Royal Norwegian Air Force Gloster Gladiator in combat and two on the ground in exchange for one Ju 52. Commander Hansen and Helmut Lent maintained over claiming an RAF Coastal Command Short Sunderland probing Oslo fjord.

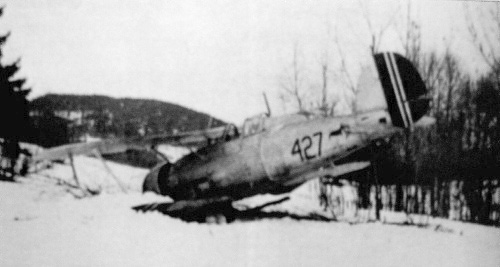
Norwegian Gladiator 427 downed by Lent on 9 April 1940

The Haerens Flygevåpen possessed only 24 combat aircraft (13 serviceable) and five Tiger Moth trainers. Most flew north to continue the fight against the invaders. Six aircraft, including four Curtiss P-36 Hawks, were destroyed by ZG 76. The landing at Stavanger was successful, but 3./KG 4 and 3./ZG 76 failed to prevent eight Caproni Ca.135 bombers escaping north. From Stavanger Airport, Sola, on 12 April, Hauptmann Günther Reinecke's I./ZG 76 claimed five Wellingtons on this date but the Luftwaffe could not stop the destruction of 12 aircraft and the damage to 31 others at Bergen and Stavanger-Sola to 2 May. ZG 76 carried out strafing missions countering the Åndalsnes landings and Namsos campaign. Kampfgeschwader 26 (KG 26—26th Bomber Wing) and Kampfgeschwader 1 (KG 1—1st Bomber Wing) destroyed the ammunition dumps and razed the wharves. HMS Glorious flew in Gladiator squadrons to Lesjaskogsvatnet on 24 April. In response, LG 1, escorted by Bf 110s from ZG 76 and sometimes the Zerstörergruppe (Z) of Kampfgeschwader 30 (KG 30—30th Bomber Wing), destroyed the airfield in eight hours, eliminating 19 fighters. The survivors flew to the airstrip at Setnesmoen, which was destroyed in further attacks while the last five Norwegian combat aircraft and five Moths flew north.

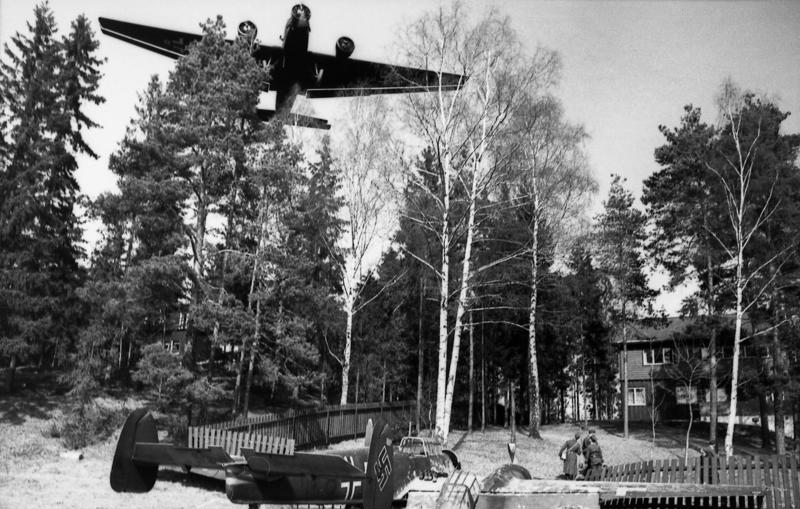
Lent's Bf 110C ran out of fuel during the Battle of Fornebu and was forced to land. A troop-carrying Ju 52 flies over Lent's Bf 110.

Further south, I./ZG 76 was less successful. On 12 April it accounted for two No. 149 Squadron Wellingtons and Squadron Leader Nolan, No. 38 Squadron. All crews were killed. Nolan was probably shot down by the future night fighter ace Helmut Woltersdorf. On 30 April RAF Bomber Command struck at Stavanger. ZG 76 lost their commanding officer, Hauptmann Günther Reinecke killed in action with British bombers, along with other flying aces Leutnant Helmut Fahlbusch and Oberfeldwebel Georg Fleischmann. Reinecke was replaced by Hauptmann Werner Restermeyer. The gruppe claimed four bombers between 20:40 and 21:00 in the last minutes of daylight preventing the action from being classified as night fighter interceptions.

ZG 76 fought in the Battles of Narvik to counter the threat from RAF fighter units operating from Bardufoss Airport. The aerial battles were complicated for ZG 76 by the introduction of the Bf 110D-0 "dachshund" belly which provided the aircraft with a 30-minute increase in endurance but at the cost of further reductions in maneuverability in an already unmanuverable aircraft in combat nimble single-seat fighters. The wing supported I./StG 1 and its bombing offensive against Bodø, which damaged much of the town. Among the final known air combats over Norway during the campaign involved Lent. Flight Lieutenant Caesar Hull was shot down by Lent on 27 May and on the 2 June No. 263 Squadron, aircraft serial number N5893 piloted by Pilot Officer J.L. Wilkie were downed. I./ZG 76 remained in Norway with Jagdgeschwader 77 (JG 77—77th Fighter Wing) for air defence after the campaign. On 9 July 1940 they two units shot down seven from 12 Blenheim bombers (from No. 12 Squadron) sent to bomb Stavanger.

The Luftwaffe considered a glider-borne assault on the Allied-held airfield at Bardufoss but it had only nine gliders available. Further operations were precluded by the Allied withdrawal in view of the worsening situation in France. The cost of the campaign to the Luftwaffe was 260 aircraft, including 86 transports. 1,130 aircrew became casualties, including 341 killed, and 448 missing. They destroyed 93 of the 169 British aircraft lost including 43 in air combat, 24 by Luftwaffe-controlled anti-aircraft units. The most successful unit was ZG 76 which was credited with 16 enemy aircraft followed by JG 77 with 13.

=== Western Europe ===
Stab and II./ZG 76 was assigned to the Fliegerkorps I under the command of Generaloberst Grauert near Cologne-Wahn. On 10 May 1940 the German offensive opened with Fall Gelb, the Battle of the Netherlands and Battle of Belgium as a prelude to the larger Battle of France. During the first day of operations the heavy fighter wings flew 2,000 sorties with the Bf 109-equipped units. ZG 76 supported the southern flank of Army Group B and the northern flank of Army Group A during the Panzer Divisions dash to the English Channel following the breakthrough at Sedan from 14 May. With JG 2, JG 53 and JG 77 the wing protected the bridges over the Meuse at Sedan. The French and RAF Advanced Air Striking Force (AASF) air attacks were repulsed with heavy losses.

On 15 May it is known to have fought in combat with No. 87 Squadron over Montcornet—the site of a major battle two days later—II./ZG 76 reporting two losses. A No. 87 Squadron pilot was reported killed in this encounter. Later in the day, a known success was reported in combat with No. 3 Squadron which attempted to engage Dornier Do 17s of 8./KG 76. Two pilots are believed to have been lost to II./ZG 76. One was killed, the other captured. On 18 May, II./ZG 76 flew as escorts to III./KG 76 as the group made repeated bombing raids. Over Vitry airfield, a large dogfight broke out when all available Hawker Hurricane units were scrambled to intercept. No. 79, No. 607, No. 615 and No. 151 Squadron were involved. Over Merville, Nord and Lille one 4 and one 6./ZG 76 crew were killed. Geschwaderkommodore Walter Grabmann, who flew with Stab./ZG 76 that evening was shot down and became a prisoner of war. His gunner, Feldwebel Richard Krone was killed in action. According to records, one Hurricane from B Flight, No. 111 Squadron, that arrived on the scene was shot down by a ZG 76 Bf 110. a No. 56 Squadron Hurricane pilot from B Flight, Flight Lieutenant S Soden was killed in action with II./ZG 76.

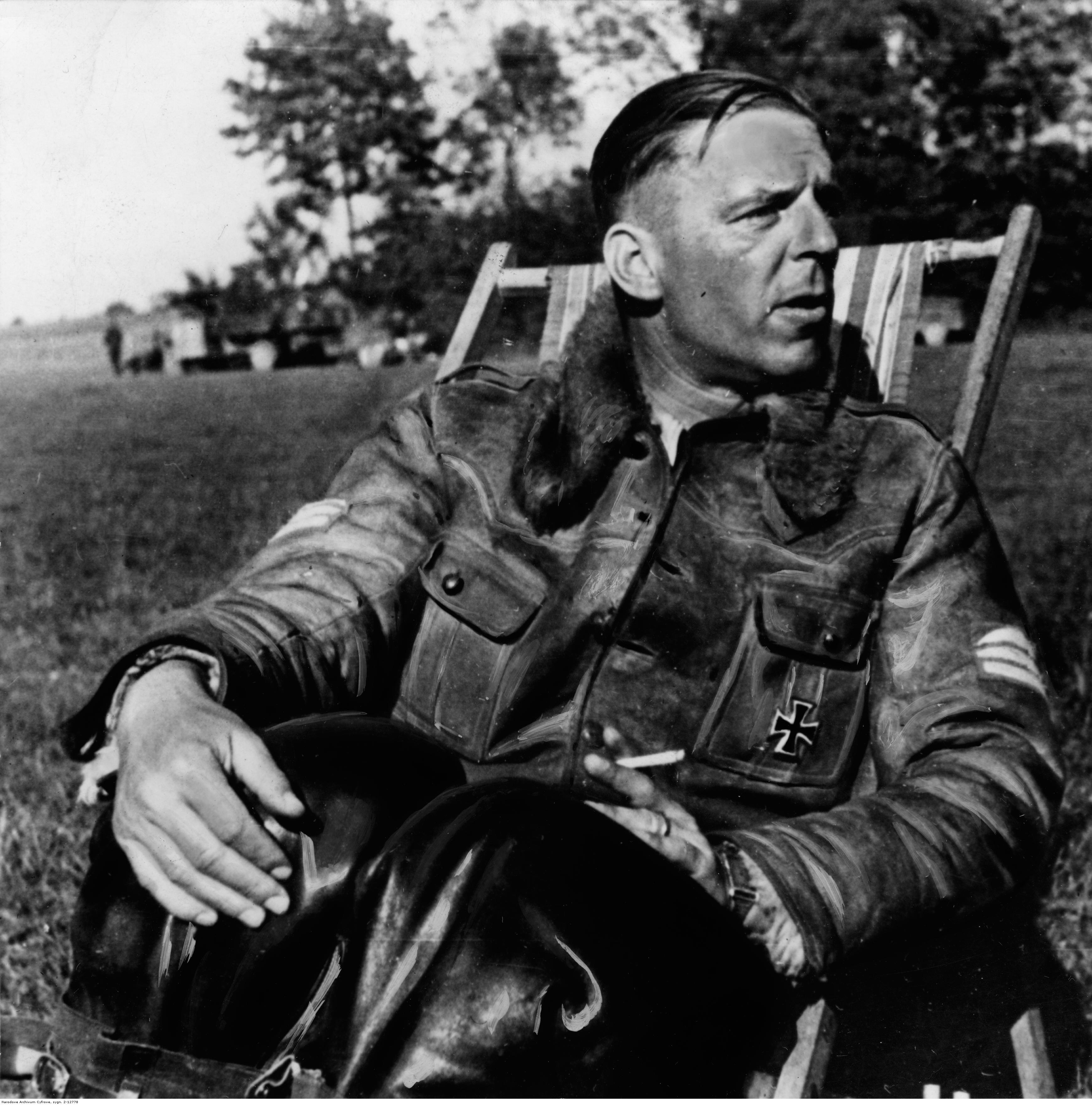
Walter Grabmann, the first Geschwaderkommodore was shot down and captured on 18 May 1940

On 21 May, ZG 76 was in combat supporting German forces in the Battle of Arras. In combat with No. 229 and No. 253 Squadrons intercepting bombers from III./KG 1, the ZG 76 Bf 110s managed to down two Hurricanes; one pilot was killed while Squadron Leader Elliot was captured. One of the 9./KG 1 bombers was shot down. On 23 May, according to Fighter Command records, four fighters were lost in action with Bf 110 units killing one pilot, wounding another while two were wounded.

II./ZG 76 fought over the Dunkirk beaches during the Battle of Dunkirk. On 26 May the gruppe made a single claim against an unknown aircraft type and squadron. According to RAF Fighter Command records, two Hurricane pilots were shot down by Bf 110s this day—the pilot from No. 17 Squadron was killed and the other from No. 605 Squadron returned to his unit. Neither ZG 1, ZG 2 or ZG 26 filed any claims on 26 May. Dunkirk was a severe test for Fighter Command which had been designed as a defensive force. Fighter leaders were often forced to operate outside of British-based radar range, and thus RAF controllers in England were unable to assist in coordinating the squadrons. The Germans could dictate the terms of the battle; the when, where and height of the engagement, often in superior numbers. On 27 May four fighters were reported lost in combat with Bf 110s (two credited to Bf 110s and Junkers Ju 88 bombers) by Fighter Command.

The command staffel and II./ZG 76 continued operations with Fliegerkorps I for the duration of Fall Rot. Fliegerkorps I operated in the Brittany and Normandy sectors in a bid to stop further evacuations. The air corps failed, and Operation Aerial succeeded.

Hans-Joachim Jabs surmised his experience with ZG 76 over Europe in the Bf 110 as follows; "I flew a 110 from 10 May 1940 over France, Belgium and during the Battle of Britain. In the Me 110 we were superior to the French and Belgians, whether Morane or Curtis. But we were inferior to the Spitfire, and Hurricane as well." By the end of May 1940 Jabs had claimed six aircraft.

=== Battle of Britain ===
In August 1940 the Stabschwarme, II. and III. Gruppe based at Laval. Hitler decided that air superiority of England was required if any invasion, codenamed Operation Sea Lion proceeded. The Luftwaffe began probing attacks by day and night over England. Luftflotte 2 and Luftflotte 3 began bombing attacks on British convoys in the English Channel in the hopes of blocking the sea lanes to shipping and drawing out RAF Fighter Command and depleting its strength and a prelude to attacking airfields and aircraft factories. The Luftwaffe referred to this period as the Kanalkampf.

On 10 July the Battle of Britain opened with attacks on Channel convoy Bread. Wolfram Freiherr von Richthofen ordered Fliegerkorps VIII to prepared for further operations at first light. Hugo Sperrle, commanding Luftflotte 3, ordered more Stuka attack. ZG 76 from Fliegerkorps I was tasked with performing fighter escort duties for Ju 87s of III/StG 2. No. 87, No. 238 and No. 601 Squadron intercepted and ZG 76 lost four crews protecting the Stukas over the Isle of Portland. The Ju 87s lost one from the two staffeln committed to the attack. Only one No. 601 Squadron fighter was lost, to British anti-aircraft fire. On 12 August, ZG 76 joined with ZG 2 to field 120 Bf 110s ordered to protect 100+ Ju 88s from Kampfgeschwader 51 (KG 51—51st Bomber Wing), supported by 25 Bf 109s from I. Gruppe of Jagdgeschwader 53 (JG 53—53rd Fighter Wing). Convoys Agent and Booty were under-attack at sea, but the formation passed these and was picked up by Poling radar station south of Brighton. Fighter Command responded with large forces. 48 Hurricanes and 10 Spitfires were ordered from RAF Middle Wallop, Exeter, RAF Tangmere and RAF Warmwell to intercept. The fighters orbited to attract RAF fighters while the Ju 88s turned to attack Portsmouth. The attack destroyed many installations including Portsmouth Harbour railway station, three small vessels and oil storage tanks. Geschwaderkommodore Dr Johann-Volkmar Fisser was killed despite the escort. The RAF controllers fed their pilots piecemeal into the battle and the German fighters, denied a worthwhile target to justify breaking from their position, remained high above the battle and did not surrender it until the Ju 88s were in danger of decimation. Ten Ju 88s were shot down. ZG 2 lost three Bf 110s and four damaged while ZG 76 reported on loss and two damaged. ZG 76 were engaged by No. 609 Squadron.

On 13 August Operation Eagle Attack began with Adlertag. The official go-ahead was given at 14:00. 52 Ju 87s from StG 1 and StG 2 who were to strike at RAF Warmwell and Yeovil. II., and III./JG 53 and III./ZG 76 flew escort for the Ju 87s. Virtually all of No. 10 Group RAF scrambled to intercept. One staffel from II./StG 2 was badly hit by No. 609 Squadron; six out of nine Ju 87s were shot down. StG 1 and 2 gave up on their original targets owing to clouds. Both headed for Portland. Erprobungsgruppe 210 was sent further east for an operation to attack targets near Southend. They took off at 15:15 and were escorted by ZG 76. They found unbroken cloud over Essex. No. 56 Squadron intercepted, and Erprobungsgruppe 210 dropped their bombs over Canterbury. ZG 76 reported two losses during the mission; apparently elements of the gruppe spotted and attacked RAF Manston and lost two crews to ground fire.

On 15 August Luftflotte 5 joined the battle as the Luftwaffe attacked Fighter Command from the south, east and north. I./ZG 76 was still based in Norway and provided escort for Heinkel He 111s from I. and III./KG 26. The bombers headed for Newcastle but were intercepted by No. 605, No. 72, No. 69 and No. 41 Squadrons. Heinkel He 115 floatplanes from and 1 and 3 /506 flew toward Montrose but a three degree error by the leading He 111s caused the German formation to fly a parallel track which proved disastrous. No. 13 Group RAF were able to concentrate against the intruders. Eight He 111s from KG 26 were shot down. Seven I./ZG 26 Bf 110s were shot down protecting them. Gruppenkommandeur Hauptmann Restemeyer was killed in action. Stab, II. and III./ZG 76 lost 12 Bf 110s between them in the southeast flying escort for elements of LG 1 against RAF Worthy Down. Gruppenkommandeur Hauptmann Dickore, III./ZG 26 was killed—two group commanders were lost this day. The day's operations cost the Luftwaffe heavy losses which prompted the crews to refer to the 15 August as "Black Thursday." Dickore was replaced by Rolf Kaldrack.

ZG 76 was back in action the following day. Heavy raids were made against airfields in southern England, though German intelligence failings often mistook RAF Bomber Command, RAF Coastal Command and Fleet Air Arm bases for fighter fields. The day's operations cost ZG 76 four crews and one damaged, from the Stab/ZG 76 in combat with No. 609 and No. 19 Squadron. The casualties were sustained when 100 aircraft from StG 2, Jagdgeschwader 2 (JG 2—2nd Fighter Wing) followed by 12 Kampfgeschwader 54 (KG 54—54th Bomber Wing) Ju 88s escorted by III./ZG 76 struck at Tangmere and other airfields. ZG 76 did not participate in the battles of the 18 August—known as The Hardest Day—it reported no casualties on this date. ZG 26 made up the burden of Bf 110 operations and suffered heavy losses. 13 Bf 110s were recorded as destroyed and 6 damaged. Among their casualties were two Staffelkapitän. Little activity was recorded over the following days, the only casualty being a II./ZG 76 machine in a taxiing accident at Jersey Airport; the gruppe retained a staffel there on 24 August during the German occupation of the Channel Islands in 1940. According to German loss reports from the quartermaster general Hans-Georg von Seidel, ZG 2, V./LG 1 and ZG 76 were active on 25 August. ZG 76 reported the loss of one crew, their fate is unknown. ZG 2 reported the loss of four Bf 110s and three damaged. V./LG 1 suffered two losses and two damaged. ZG 76 reported no losses on 26 August; ZG 76 reported one severely damaged and ZG 26 lost three over Chelmsford. ZG 76's last major operation of the month occurred on 30 August. Two of its aircraft were lost and one damaged. While escorting Do 17s in the vicinity of RAF Manston, No. 85 and No. 111 Squadron intercepted the German formation by chance after initialling being vectored to investigate an unknown formation—which transpired to be Blenheims from No. 25 Squadron RAF. The action attracted No. 54 Squadron led by Alan Christopher Deere the scene and they damaged two of the bombers.

The battle reached a climax in September 1940. On 1 September, ZG 76 were flying combat operations and reported one damaged but their opponents are unknown. On 2 September Kampfgeschwader 3 (KG 3—3rd Bomber Wing) Dornier bombers were operating off Deal when No. 72 Squadron engaged; Bf 110s were reported to be present among the German escorts and the fight developed over Maidstone. ZG 76 were known to operational for the wing reported one destroyed and two damaged in air combat. ZG 2 and ZG 26 were also active reporting heavier losses—four each. The burden of operations on 3 September fell to ZG 2 and ZG 26 which reported the loss of seven and two severely damaged in total. ZG 76 claimed its 500th air victory on this date, becoming the first Luftwaffe unit to do so. Grabmann had claimed 13 aerial victories in the war so far; two on this date.

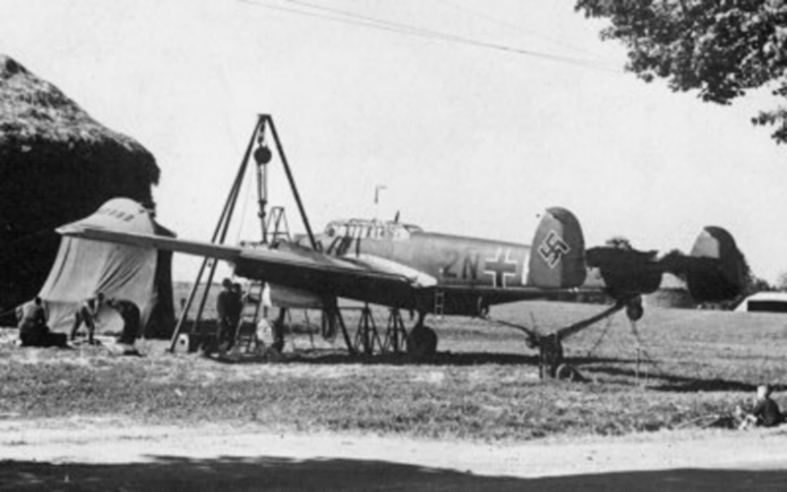
ZG 26 Bf 110 undergoing maintenance and re-arming, July 1940

The following day, 6./ZG 76 of III. Gruppe were involved in a strategic bombing operation. The OKL issued orders on 1 September to bomb British fighter factories. The staffel flew as escort for Erprobungsgruppe 210 fighter-bombers towards Sussex, crossing the coast at Littlehampton with the objective of attacking the Brooklands factory. A simultaneous operation by 70 Do 17s and 200 Bf 109s began attacks against Canterbury, Faversham, Reigate, Redhill and Eastchurch. The formation of 20 bomb-carrying Bf 110s and their ZG76 escort were spotted by the Royal Observer Corps near Guildford at 6,000 feet (1,800 metres). No. 253 Squadron from Kenley was ordered to intercept. However the Erprobungsgruppe 210 fighter-bombers reached the target unmolested, but overflew the Hawker factory, and hit the Vickers works destroying the machine shops and assembly sheds for the Vickers Wellington bomber. The area was devastated and took four days to clear the rubble. 700 factory workers became casualties; 88 were killed. The specific target, the Hawker assembly plant escaped untouched and the fighter-bombers escaped without loss. However, their escort from ZG76 were bounced by the 253 squadron Hurricanes as they fled south. Several were shot down over West Clandon, West Horsley and Netley Heath on the North Downs above Shere. Only one crew member, a rear gunner, managed to bail out, and he was treated for his wounds by the doctor in Ripley, Surrey. Other Bf 110 units suffered losses in the day's fighting. LG 1 lost four and one damaged, ZG 2 suffered damage to one aircraft. Zerstörer pilots and crew were, by 5 September at least, aware of their precarious position in the skies over England and their aircraft were at a disadvantage against modern single-engine fighters.

On 15 September 1940 the Luftwaffe sent nearly 1,000 aircraft against Greater London. This date became known as the Battle of Britain Day. The Luftwaffe's attacks were repulsed with high losses though London and the Thames Estuary docks were severely damaged. LG 1 were the only wing to report losses to its Bf 110 units. Over the next two days the only recorded activity of ZG 76 was the loss of one aircraft in an accident on 17 September On 24 September Erprobungsgruppe 210 bombed the Woolston factory at Southampton on the water front. 98 people were killed and 40 wounded when the shelter was hit, but little damage occurred to the factory. ZG 76 flew as escort. The bomb-carrying Bf 110s lost one and although ZG 76 avoided losses, four suffered damage to anti-aircraft fire; two of the damaged fell into the Channel. One of the crews was rescued by a Heinkel He 59. Three days later seven Bf 110s from LG 1 and ZG 76 were lost on similar operations over England in the morning. In the afternoon ZG 76 flew missions in the Bristol area. ZG 76 lost one on this date, with another severely damaged in action with No. 17 Squadron. On 5 October ZG 76 escorted the unit to RAF West Malling. Engaged by the famed No. 303 Squadron, ZG 76 suffered no losses but their charges lost two and two damaged. Among the dead was acting group commander of Erprobungsgruppe 210, Werner Weimann.

The Bf 110, according to one analyst, has been underestimated in the Battle of Britain historiography. The statistics show Bf 110 pilots' claim-to-loss ratio was more favourable than other fighters of the battle; but German claims were usually exaggerated. German airmen claimed 3,085 British aircraft destroyed during the battle; actual RAF losses were 915. The Battle of Britain was expensive for the Zerstörer wings. The Luftwaffe began the battle with 237 serviceable Bf 110s. They lost 223 in the waging of it, with many units fighting to near extinction.

=== Post-Battle of Britain, Balkans, Mediterranean and Iraq ===
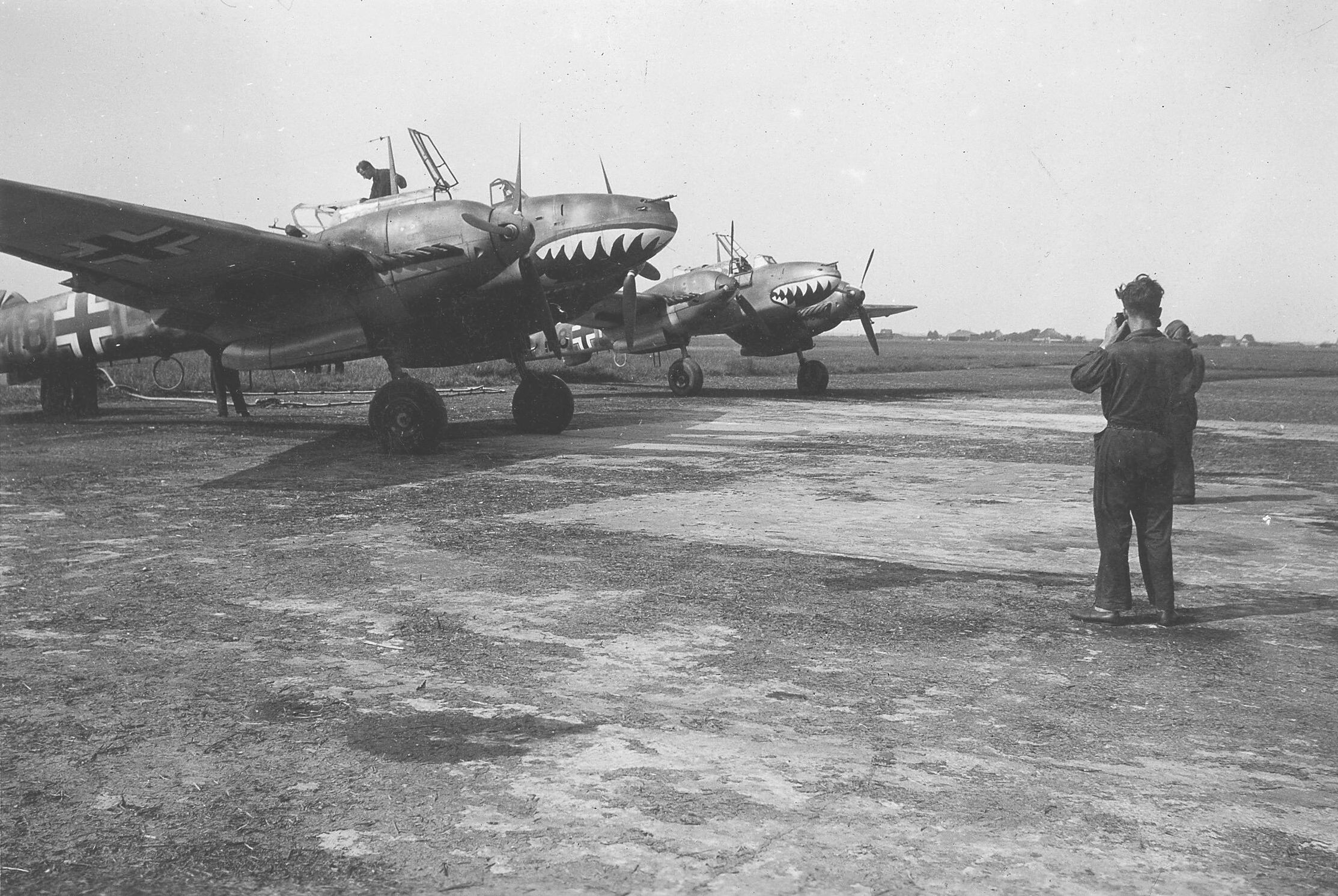
Bf 110 aircraft of ZG 76 at De Kooy airfield, Occupied Netherlands, in 1941.

ZG 76 lingered on the Channel and in Scandinavia until late 1940. Stab/ZG 76 became Jagdfliegerführer Norwegen under Grabmann until approximately June 1941, when appears to have been disbanded. I./ZG 76, under the command of Hauptmann Heinrich Graf von Stillfried und Rattonitz, was disbanded on 7 September 1940, during the Battle of Britain in Norway and re designated II. Gruppe of Nachtjagdgeschwader 1 (NJG 1—1st Night Fighter Wing). II./ZG 76 was withdrawn to the German-occupied Netherlands, Amsterdam, then to Jever to protect the Heliogland Bight from 1 January 1941 and renamed III. Gruppe of Nachtjagdgeschwader 3 (NJG 3—3rd Night Fighter Wing). In each case the pilots were retrained as night fighter pilots from 11 November 1941. It was the only gruppe to participate in the Balkans Campaign in April and May 1941. II./ZG 76 was attached to the Stab of Jagdgeschwader 1 (JG 1—1st Fighter Wing) and Zerst.E-Gruppe, the latter based at Wesermünde Geest. The latter group moved to Aalborg in Denmark. III./ZG 76 moved to Bergen, Norway while Stab/ZG 76 remained in Stavanger. III./ZG 76 was exiled to Norway in October 1940 under the command of Rolf Kaldrack and disbanded on 24 April 1941 to become II/SKG 210. It began reformation in 1943 but this was never completed and personnel were sent to the reformed I./ZG 76 in 1944.

ZG 76 was not recorded on Luftflotte 4's order of battle for the German invasion of Yugoslavia or the Battle of Greece on 5 April 1941. II./ZG 76 moved to Argos where one of its aircraft was damaged in a surprise attack by No. 252 Squadron on 14 May, during the build-up to the Battle of Crete. II./ZG 76 was allocated to Richthofen's Fliegerkorps VIII. On 22 May, two days into the battle, ZG 76 reported its first two losses in action over Suda Bay. A further crew was lost when the group attacked Motor Launch ML1011. The vessel was holed and one crewman killed. During the Crete operation a single staffel, 4./ZG 76, flew to Mosul, Iraq, to fight the Anglo-Iraqi War, but the venture was a failure. Among the crews that travelled was Martin Drewes who became a successful night fighter pilot. The aircraft wore Iraqi Air Force insignia. The campaign in Crete ended in a pyrrhic victory for the Germans because of the paratrooper and aircraft losses.

=== Defence of the Reich ===
In mid-1943 the Zerstörer wings experienced a brief revival. The Defence of the Reich (Reichsverteidigung—RLV) was now a priority theatre, despite the defeats on the Eastern Front and in North Africa. The RLM in Berlin decided there was merit in reforming the Bf 110 units for the firepower of the type was suitable for destroying heavy bombers over Germany. The OKL foresaw their use while the Luftwaffe still retained a measure of control over German skies and in southern European theatres in the naval escort and close air support role. Scattered Zerstörer units were recalled from Eastern Europe and Mediterranean for be reformed into wings. ZG 76 was ordered to reform in southern Germany from training and reconnaissance units. The wing was permitted two gruppen of Bf 110Gs. The wing was partially equipped with Messerschmitt Me 410s and aircrew drawn from I./NJG 101. The reformed unit was assigned to the 5. Jagddivision. ZG 76 was still in southern Germany through the winter, 1943/44. 6./ZG 76 were photographed in formation over the German Alps with drop tanks, a double 20mm cannon pod under the fuselage and armed with Werfer-Granate 21. All gruppen of ZG 76 had the Werfer-Granate 21 installed to break up American bomber formations.

Theodor Rossiwall was given command of ZG 76. Initially formed with Bf 110s but converted to the Me 410 in full by April 1944. I./ZG 76 reformed at Ansbach, II./ZG 76 at Wertheim under Major Herbert Kaminski. Hauptmann Johannes Kiel was to command III./ZG 76 from Oettingen in Bayern, but a shortage of aircraft forced the abandonment of this and the remnants were subsumed into I./ZG 76. Though faster than the Bf 110, the Me 410 was not liked by its crews. It was more difficult to bail out of, and was not as agile as the Bf 110. Some crews felt the Bf 110 could sustain much more combat damage than the Me 410.

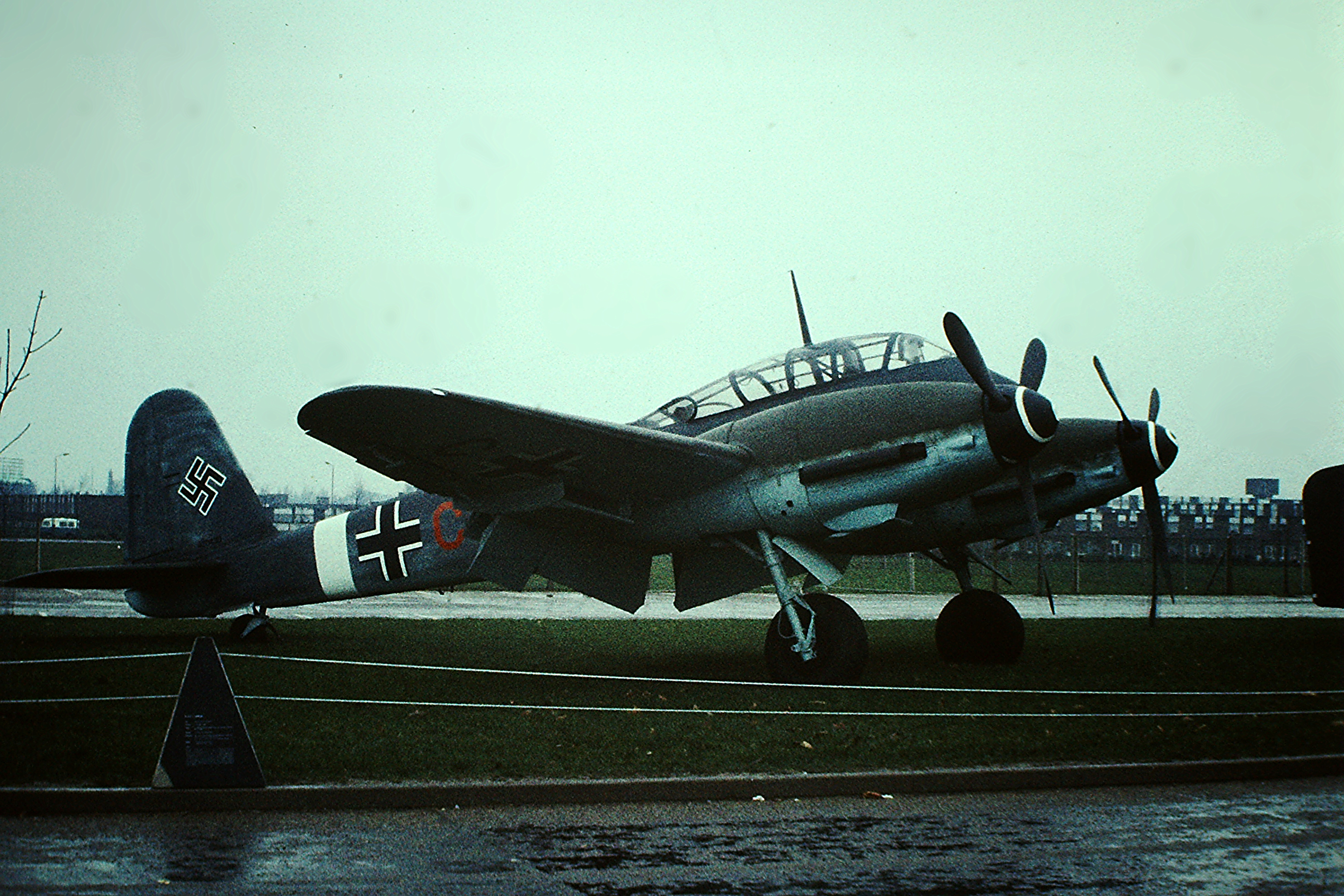
Me 410, operated by ZG 76 from April 1944

On 4 October 1943 the US Eighth Air Force attacked targets in Frankfurt. Some 130 B-17 Flying Fortress bombers were dispatched by the 1st Bombardment Division while 168 from the 3rd Bomb Division operated against targets in the Saarland and the Saint-Dizier airbase, which had been made operational and housed II. Gruppe of Jagdgeschwader 27 (JG 27—27th Fighter Wing). 14 B-17s were ultimately lost. II./ZG 76 engaged the bomber stream alone and claimed four. They then ran into the US 56th Fighter Group, without any escorting Focke-Wulf Fw 190s or Bf 109s near Düren. The resulting dogfight was characterised by Caldwell and Richard R. Muller as a "slaughter." Nine Bf 110s and 11 men were killed with seven wounded. The dead included both group commanders. The introduction of long-range American fighter escorts in February 1944, signalled an increase in losses for the Zerstörergeschwader. On 16 March 1944, 26 of 43 Bf 110s sent by ZG 76 into battle were shot down; a devastating loss rate.

By August 1944, the German front in Normandy was on the verge of collapse at Falaise. The battles in Normandy had left the German fighter forces spread thinly; the resulting attrition having taken a toll of fighter units. II./ZG 76 was reforming and recuperating alone at Prague. Stab and I./ZG 76 were still operational but had to be used with extreme caution. They were based in Vienna under the command of the 8. Jagddivision with II./ZG 1. Only I. Gruppe of Jagdgeschwader 302 (JG 302—302nd Fighter Wing) was assigned to the division with single-engine fighters. II./ZG 26 remained isolated in East Prussia. In the south ZG 76 formed the defences against the US Fifteenth Air Force. On 16 June 1944 the Americans attacked Vienna and Bratislava. I. Gruppe of Jagdgeschwader 300 (JG 300—300th Fighter Wing), I./JG 302, II./ZG 1 and I./ZG 76 flew interceptions. 20 Consolidated B-24 Liberator bombers were claimed along with one Lockheed P-38 Lightning and two North American P-51 Mustangs. American losses totalled nine B-24s, two B-17s, seven P-38s and one P-51s. The majority of the P-38s fell to Hungarian-flown Bf 109s. US fighter pilot claimed 40; at least 16 Axis fighters were shot down. On 20 June, the Eighth Air Force sent 1,378 bombers to targets in Hamburg, Bremen and Hannover. The only interception attempted by ZG 76 was against the 492nd Bombardment Group as the Germans flew north from Prague. They were hit by P-51s before they reached the bombers and lost three Me 410s and their crews. An attack by 667 bombers of the US Fifteenth against Vienna unfolded on the 26 June 1944. I./ZG 76 claimed three B-24s but lost eight Bf 110s. On 27 June the Fifteenth attacked Budapest. Over Lake Balaton, II./ZG 1 and I./ZG 76 took advantage of cloud cover to shoot down four B-24s from the 460th Bombardment Group. On 2 July the Americans struck at the city again. I./ZG 76 committed 20 Me 410s. I./ZG 76 reported to have found a gap in the escort and claimed 13 bombers for one Me 410. Only four bombers failed to return, however.

=== Disbandment ===
ZG 76 was disbanded and its personnel went to the reformation of Jagdgeschwader 76 (JG 76—76th Fighter Wing), equipped with the Bf 109 single-engine fighter.

== Commanding officers ==
- Generalmajor Walter Grabmann, 15 April 1940 – 31 July 1941
- Oberstleutnant Theodor Rossiwall, August 1943 – 24 January 1944
- Oberstleutnant Robert Kowalewski, 25 January – 24 July 1944
