= Dietrich Hrabak =

German Luftwaffe pilot during World War II (1914–1995)

- Hrabak during World War II
- Born: 19 December 1914; Großdeuben, German Empire
- Died: 15 September 1995 (aged 80); Pfaffenhofen, Germany
- Military career
- Allegiance: Nazi Germany (to 1945); West Germany
- Branch: Reichsmarine (to 1935); Luftwaffe; German Air Force
- Service years: 1934–1945; 1955–1970
- Rank: Oberst (Wehrmacht); Generalmajor (Bundeswehr)
- Units: JG 138, JG 76
- Commands: JG 54, JG 52
- Conflicts: See battles World War II: Invasion of Poland; Battle of France; Battle of Britain; Operation Barbarossa
- Awards: Knight's Cross of the Iron Cross with Oak Leaves

Dietrich "Dieter" Hrabak (19 December 1914 – 15 September 1995) was a German Luftwaffe military aviator and wing commander during World War II. Following the war, he became a Generalmajor (major general) in the German Air Force of West Germany. As a fighter ace, he claimed 125 enemy aircraft shot down in over 1000 combat missions. The majority of his aerial victories were claimed over the Eastern Front with 16 claims over the Western Allies.

Born in Großdeuben, Hrabak grew up in the German Empire and the Weimar Republic. Following graduation from school, he volunteered for military service in the Reichsmarine in 1934. In November 1935, he transferred to the Luftwaffe. Following flight training, he was posted to a Jagdgeschwader (fighter wing). In 1939, Hrabak was made a Staffelkapitän (squadron leader) and with Jagdgeschwader 76 (JG 76—76th Fighter Wing) participated in the Invasion of Poland and Battle of France and claimed his first aerial victory on 13 May 1940. In July 1940, JG 76 was integrated into Jagdgeschwader 54 (JG 54—54th Fighter Wing). During the Battle of Britain, Hrabak was made a Gruppenkommandeur in JG 54 and awarded the Knight's Cross of the Iron Cross in October 1940. In 1941, he participated in Operation Barbarossa, the German invasion of the Soviet Union. In November 1942, Hrabak left JG 54 and was appointed Geschwaderkommodore (wing commander) of Jagdgeschwader 52 (JG 52—52nd Fighter Wing). There, following his 118th aerial victory, he was awarded the Knight's Cross of the Iron Cross with Oak Leaves on 25 November 1943. In October 1944 Hrabak, returned to JG 54, serving as its last Geschwaderkommodore until the end of the war.

Following World War II, Hrabak initially worked in the private industry. During the Wiederbewaffnung (rearmament) of West Germany, Hrabak joined the newly established German Air Force in 1955. He then went on to command the Advanced Pilot Training Center at Fürstenfeldbruck. Following further command positions, Hrabak was named NATO's Chief of Air Defense/Central Europe until becoming special manager for the Lockheed F-104 Starfighter programme. Hrabak retired in September 1970 and died on 15 September 1995.

== Early life and career ==
Hrabak was born on 19 December 1914 in Großdeuben, part of Böhlen, in the Kingdom of Saxony, a federated state of the German Empire, the son of a real estate developer. Following his graduation from the Königin-Carola-Gymnasium, a secondary school, he volunteered for military service. On 8 April 1934, Hrabak joined the Reichsmarine, (Note: The German Reichsmarine was renamed the Kriegsmarine on 1 June 1935.) the German navy of the Weimar Republic and in November 1935 transferred to the newly emerging Luftwaffe (German air force) as an Oberfähnrich (officer candidate). On 1 April 1936, Hrabak was promoted to Leutnant (second lieutenant).

Following the Anschluss, Austria's annexation into Nazi Germany on 12 March 1938, Hrabak was posted to I. Gruppe (1st group) of Jagdgeschwader 138 (JG 138—138th Fighter Wing) stationed in Wien-Aspern also referred to as the "Wiener-Jagdgruppe" ("Vienna fighter group"). There, he was promoted to Oberleutnant (first lieutenant) on 1 January 1939 and was made Staffelkapitän (squadron leader) of 1. Staffel (1st squadron) of JG 138. On 1 May 1939, his unit I./JG 138 was re-designated I./Jagdgeschwader 76 (I./JG 76—1st group of the 76th Fighter Wing).

== World War II ==
World War II in Europe began on Friday 1 September 1939 when German forces invaded Poland. In preparation of the invasion, I. Gruppe of JG 76 had been moved to an airfield at Stubendorf, present-day Izbicko in Poland, in mid-August 1939 and supported the German advance on the central and southern sectors of the front. On 3 September, Hrabak made a forced landing behind enemy lines following combat with PZL.23 light bombers and returned to his unit the next day.

On 14 September, I. Gruppe was withdrawn from combat operations and returned to its home airfield at Wien-Aspern where it arrived on 26 September. On 26 October, the Gruppenstab and 1. Staffel were ordered to Frankfurt Rhein-Main where it was united again with 2. and 3. Staffel on 2 November. From Frankfurt Rhein-Main, the Gruppe flew fighter protection during the "Phoney War" for the Frankfurt, Rhine and Saar region. In April 1940, I. Gruppe moved to an airfield at Mainz-Finthen, originally named Fliegerhorst Ober-Olm. The Gruppe stayed at Ober-Olm until the Battle of France began.

On 13 May 1940, he claimed his first victory, and he claimed five more victories before the Armistice of 22 June 1940. On 26 June 1940, I. Gruppe of JG 76 was moved to the airfield at Waalhaven in the Netherlands and subordinated to Jagdgeschwader 54 (JG 54—54th Fighter Wing). There, the Gruppe was tasked with providing aerial protection over the Dutch coastal area. On 5 July, I./JG 76 was officially integrated into JG 54 and was renamed to II./JG 54 and 1./JG 76 became 4./JG 54.

On 25 August 1940 during the Battle of Britain, Hrabak was made Gruppenkommandeur of II./JG 54. In consequence, Oberleutnant Hans Philipp was given command of 4./JG 54. During the Battle of Britain he added ten victories against Royal Air Force (RAF) fighters. On 21 October 1940 Hrabak was awarded the Knight's Cross of the Iron Cross (Ritterkreuz des Eisernen Kreuzes). The presentation was made by Reichsmarschall Hermann Göring in his personal command train at Beauvais on 23 October.

On 29 March 1941, II./JG 54 was withdrawn from the English Channel and was ordered to Graz-Thalerhof. There the various squadrons were split up and became part of Fliegerführer Arad. 4. Staffel was subordinated to III. Gruppe of Jagdgeschwader 77 (JG 77—77th Fighter Wing) and 6. Staffel assigned to II. Gruppe of JG 77. Both Staffeln were ordered to Deta in Romania while 5. Staffel went to Arad. On 6 April, all three Staffeln flew combat missions in the Invasion of Yugoslavia. The next day, they flew combat air patrols on the Hungarian-Yugoslavian border. On 9 April, II./JG 54 was united again at Kecskemét, Hungary and returned to Deta on 11 April. The Gruppe was withdrawn from this theater on 19 April and ordered to an airfield at Zemun near Belgrade.

=== Operation Barbarossa ===
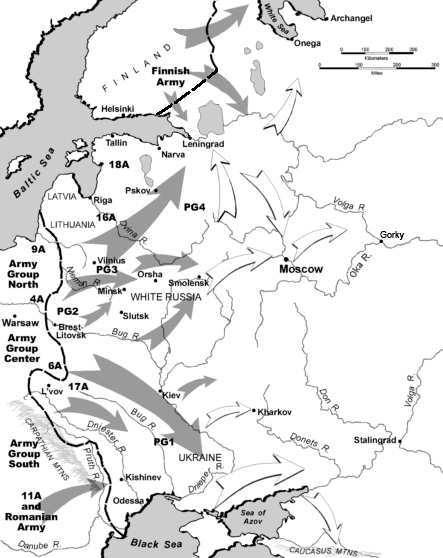
Map indicating Operation Barbarossa's attack plan

Following the surrender of the Royal Yugoslav Army on 17 April 1941, JG 54 received orders on 3 May 1941 to turn over all Bf 109-Es so they could receive the new Bf 109-F variant. Transition training was completed at Airfield Stolp-Reitz in Pomerania. Following intensive training, the Geschwader was moved to airfields in Eastern Prussia. II. Gruppe under command of Hrabak was moved to Trakehnen on 20 June 1941. The Wehrmacht launched Operation Barbarossa, the invasion of the Soviet Union, on 22 June with II. Gruppe supporting Army Group North in its strategic goal towards Leningrad.

In early November, the Gruppe was withdrawn from the Eastern Front for a period of rest and replenishment where they were based at airfields in Döberitz, and later at Uetersen. On 20 January 1942, the Gruppe began relocating to the Eastern Front where they would be based at Siverskaya near Leningrad. In August to early September 1941, Hrabak was on home leave. He was promoted to Major (major) on 1 October 1942.

=== Wing commander ===
On 1 November 1942, Hrabak left JG 54 and took over command of Jagdgeschwader 52 (JG 52—52nd Fighter Wing) as Geschwaderkommodore (wing commander). At the time, JG 52 was based at Prokhladny and Gonschtakowka and operated over the front at the Terek River in the Northern Caucasus. In consequence, command of II. Gruppe of JG 54 was given to Major Hans Hahn. Under Hrabak's leadership, JG 52 claimed its 10,000th aerial victory on 2 September 1944.

On 23 November, the Geschwaderstab (headquarters unit) of JG 52 began its retreat from the Caucasus region and moved to Maykop. There, Hrabak claimed his first aerial victory as Geschwaderkommodore on 13 December over a Petlyakov Pe-2 bomber. While the Battle of Stalingrad was coming to end, Hrabak and the Geschwaderstab were ordered to Rostov-on-Don on 20 January 1943 to organize fighter protection over the retreating Army Group A.

Hrabak was promoted to Oberstleutnant on 1 July 1943. On 2 August, Hrabak claimed his 100th victory. He was the 48th Luftwaffe pilot to achieve the century mark. On 25 November 1943, Hrabak was awarded the Knight's Cross of the Iron Cross with Oak Leaves (Ritterkreuz des Eisernen Kreuzes mit Eichenlaub). He was the 337th member of the German armed forces to be so honored and at the time was credited with 118 aerial victories. The presentation was made by Adolf Hitler at the Wolf's Lair, Hitler's headquarters in Rastenburg, present-day Kętrzyn in Poland, on 9 December. Also presented with awards that day by Hitler were Hauptmann Hans-Ulrich Rudel, who received the Swords to his Knight's Cross with Oak Leaves. Rudel's air gunner and radio operator Oberfeldwebel (Master Sergeant) Erwin Hentschel was honored with the Knight's Cross.

On 20 September 1944, Hrabak scored the last of his 125 victories. In October 1944 Hrabak returned to JG 54, serving as its last Geschwaderkommodore until the end of the war. His greatest contribution to the Luftwaffe was not his combat record however but his command, tactical and leadership qualities, which endeared him to the men under his command and sealed his reputation within the Luftwaffe leadership.

== Later life ==
In 1956, he commanded the Advanced Pilot Training Center at Fürstenfeldbruck. In 1962, he took charge of the air defense covering northern Germany and the Netherlands. In 1964, he was named NATO's Chief of Air Defense/Central Europe until becoming special manager for the Lockheed F-104 Starfighter programme. As a major general, he commanded the GAF's tactical command. Hrabak died on 15 September 1995 at the age of 80 in Pfaffenhofen which is part of Jesenwang, Germany.

== Summary of career ==
=== Aerial victory claims ===
According to US historian David T. Zabecki, Hrabak was credited with 125 aerial victories. Spick also lists Hrabak with 125 aerial victories, claimed in 820 combat missions, 109 of which on the Eastern Front and 16 on the Western Front, and a mission-to-claim ratio of 6.56. Mathews and Foreman, authors of Luftwaffe Aces — Biographies and Victory Claims, researched the German Federal Archives and found documentation for 125 aerial victory claims, all of which confirmed. This number includes 109 on the Eastern Front and 16 on the Western Front.

Victory claims were logged to a map-reference (PQ = Planquadrat), for example "PQ 54291". The Luftwaffe grid map (Jägermeldenetz) covered all of Europe, western Russia and North Africa and was composed of rectangles measuring 15 minutes of latitude by 30 minutes of longitude, an area of about 360 square miles (930 km^{2}). These sectors were then subdivided into 36 smaller units to give a location area 3 km × 4 km (1.9 mi × 2.5 mi) in size.

Chronicle of aerial victories
This and the ? (question mark) indicates information discrepancies listed by Barbas, Prien, Stemmer, Rodeike, Bock, Mathews and Foreman.
Claim	Date	Time	Type	Location	Claim	Date	Time	Type	Location
– 1. Staffel of Jagdgeschwader 76 – Battle of France — 10 May – 25 June 1940
1	13 May 1940	11:05	Potez 63	Authe, south of Sedan	4	25 May 1940	16:45	Spitfire	Gravelines
2	18 May 1940	16:25	Curtiss	west of Rethel	5	3 June 1940	15:20	Curtiss	west of Épernay
3	19 May 1940	18:30	M.S.406	west of Laon	6	6 June 1940	21:00	Curtiss	northwest of Amiens
– 4. Staffel of Jagdgeschwader 54 – At the Channel and over England — 26 June – August 1940
7	11 August 1940	11:00	Spitfire	20 km (12 mi) off Dover					
– Stab II. Gruppe of Jagdgeschwader 54 – At the Channel and over England — August 1940 – 29 March 1941
8	26 August 1940	13:25	Spitfire	Canterbury	13	5 October 1940	12:25	Hurricane	Rochester
9	14 September 1940	17:00	Hurricane	south of London	14	8 October 1940	11:45	Spitfire	north of Folkestone
10	14 September 1940	11:35	Spitfire	Ashford	15	12 October 1940	11:05	Hurricane	Tonbridge
11	27 September 1940	13:00	Hurricane? (Note: According to Mathews and Foreman claimed as a Supermarine Spitfire.)	south of London	16	20 October 1940	11:00	Hurricane	Ashford
12	27 September 1940	16:20	Hurricane?	Hastings					
– Stab II. Gruppe of Jagdgeschwader 54 – Operation Barbarossa — 22 June – 5 December 1941
17	23 June 1941	11:10	SB-2	north of Schlossberg	21	22 July 1941	18:30	I-18 (MiG-1)	Gogolewo
18	30 June 1941	15:15	DB-3	northwest of Dünaburg	22	25 July 1941	07:56	DB-3	Ssabsk
19	30 June 1941	17:17	DB-3	northeast of Dünaburg	23	25 July 1941	18:30	I-18 (MiG-1)	south of Ropcha
20	6 July 1941	18:30	DB-3	southeast of Ostrov	24	30 July 1941	11:20	I-18 (MiG-1)	Wladimirskaja
– Stab of II. Gruppe of Jagdgeschwader 54 – Eastern Front — 20 January – 30 April 1942
25	5 February 1942	15:35	I-18 (MiG-1)	northwest of Orelje	38	16 March 1942	11:42	Pe-2	forest south of Lyuban
26	6 February 1942	09:35	I-18 (MiG-1)	southeast of Malaya Vishera	39	19 March 1942	17:10	I-18 (MiG-1)	1 km (0.62 mi) southeast of Gremjatschewo
27	26 February 1942	16:40	I-26 (Yak-1)	southeast of Grusino	40	22 March 1942	14:59	Pe-2	15 km (9.3 mi) southeast of Staraya Russa
28	27 February 1942	08:20	I-18 (MiG-1)	20 km (12 mi) southeast of Kirishi	41	28 March 1942	15:23	P-40	5 km (3.1 mi) northwest of Ramushevo
29	27 February 1942	08:35	I-16	15 km (9.3 mi) south-southwest of Kirishi	42	29 March 1942	15:39	I-18 (MiG-1)	15 km (9.3 mi) northeast of Staraya Russa
30	5 March 1942	08:05	I-18 (MiG-1)	10 km (6.2 mi) southeast of Chudovo	43	31 March 1942	14:58	I-18 (MiG-1)	north of Parfino
31	7 March 1942	07:29	Pe-2	4 km (2.5 mi) southwest of Dubzy	44	1 April 1942	15:14	Il-2	northwest of Ramushevo
32	13 March 1942	17:47	I-18 (MiG-1)	west of Dubownik	45	4 April 1942	12:07	I-18 (MiG-1)	Gremjatschewo
33	13 March 1942	16:48	I-18 (MiG-1)	15 km (9.3 mi) west of Chudovo	46	4 April 1942	15:15	Il-2	east of Budogoschtsch
34	14 March 1942	11:20	Il-2	2 km (1.2 mi) north of Kholm	47	19 April 1942	18:20	Yak-1	south of Ramushevo
35	14 March 1942	16:20	I-26 (Yak-1)	forest northeast of Karlivka	48	25 April 1942	08:20	Yak-1	east of Parfino
36	14 March 1942	16:22	I-26 (Yak-1)	forest east of Sawisha	49	25 April 1942	18:20	Yak-1	Jam Jedrowo
37	16 March 1942	08:20	I-26 (Yak-1)	southwest of Gladi					
– Stab of II. Gruppe of Jagdgeschwader 54 – Eastern Front — 1 May – 31 October 1942
50	30 May 1942	09:15	MiG-3	west of Wyschitino	59	22 August 1942	11:00	LaGG-3	5 km (3.1 mi) north of Kozelsk
51	30 May 1942	16:10	MiG-3	southwest of Malaya Vishera	60	22 August 1942	15:00	Il-2	PQ 54291; 15 km (9.3 mi) west of Belyov
52	8 June 1942	15:05	MiG-3? (Note: According to Mathews and Foreman claimed as a Yakovlev Yak-1.)	2 km (1.2 mi) northeast of Kresttsy	61	22 August 1942	17:58	Il-2	20 km (12 mi) northeast of Uljanowo; 25 km (16 mi) west of Belyov
53	16 June 1942	10:50	MiG-3	southwest of Pola train station	62	23 August 1942	06:55	Pe-2	PQ 64183, east of Belyov
54	26 June 1942	16:50	MiG-3	30 km (19 mi) east of Spasskaja-Polist	63	23 August 1942	11:05	U-2	PQ 55881, Kozelsk
55	28 June 1942	11:18	P-40	15 km (9.3 mi) northeast of Kirishi	64	1 September 1942	09:04	Yak-1	PQ 10164, Putilowo
56	4 July 1942	21:00	Il-2	east of Podberesje	65	2 September 1942	06:55	Yak-1	PQ 10221, north of Wysta
57	17 July 1942	19:02	Yak-1	southeast of Pola train station	66	2 September 1942	10:16	Il-2	PQ 00254 northeast of Mga
58	19 July 1942	17:40	Yak-1	west of Beglowo	67	12 September 1942	11:05	LaGG-3	PQ 10291, Pogotje
– Stab of Jagdgeschwader 52 – Eastern Front — 1 November 1942 – 3 February 1943
68	13 December 1942	07:30	Pe-2	PQ 5463; Adler airfield					
– Stab of Jagdgeschwader 52 – Eastern Front — 4 February – 31 December 1943
69	10 March 1943	10:25	LaGG-3	PQ 34 Ost 88143, southwest of Abinskaja	94	16 July 1943	17:40	La-5	PQ 35 Ost 61251, southeast of Prokhorovka
70	10 March 1943	15:05	Il-2	PQ 34 Ost 88154, east of Abinskaja	95	1 August 1943	11:10	Il-2 m.H. (Note: The "m.H." refers to an Ilyushin Il-2 with rear gunner (mit Heckschütze).)	PQ 34 Ost 88282, Kalinowka
71	12 March 1943	08:35	Il-2	PQ 34 Ost 76584, northwest of Temrjuk	96	1 August 1943	11:12	Il-2 m.H.	PQ 34 Ost 88282, Kalinowka
72	13 March 1943	13:10	I-16	PQ 34 Ost 86351, Griwenskaja	97	1 August 1943	18:45	Il-2 m.H.	PQ 34 Ost 88261, Marinowka
73	18 March 1943	15:45	LaGG-3	PQ 34 Ost 86541, south of Petrowskaja	98	1 August 1943	18:47	Il-2 m.H.	PQ 34 Ost 88261, Marinowka
74	18 March 1943	15:47	LaGG-3	PQ 34 Ost 86541, southeast of Petrowskaja	99	2 August 1943	17:00	La-5? (Note: According to Mathews and Foreman claimed as a Lavochkin-Gorbunov-Gudkov of unknown type.)	PQ 34 Ost 98142, east of Dmitriyevka
75	19 March 1943	09:25	LaGG-3	PQ 34 Ost 85574, north of Sslawjanskaja	100	2 August 1943	17:04	Il-2 m.H.	PQ 34 Ost 98112, east of Dmitriyevka
76	20 March 1943	08:00	P-39	PQ 34 Ost 86841, southwest of Popowitschewskaja	101	20 August 1943	10:00	La-5?	PQ 35 Ost 61538, Warwarowka
77	20 March 1943	08:01	P-39	PQ 34 Ost 86841, Popowitschewskaja	102	20 August 1943	17:40	Il-2	PQ 34 Ost 88254, west of Dmitriyevka
78	16 April 1943	08:18	P-39	southeast of Abinskaja	103	20 August 1943	17:46	Il-2	PQ 34 Ost 88262, east of Dmitriyevka
79	20 April 1943	16:14	Il-2	PQ 34 Ost 75463, southwest of Kabardinka	104	21 August 1943	08:05	La-5?	PQ 34 Ost 88292, east of Kuibyschewo
80	21 April 1943	11:05	Il-2	PQ 34 Ost 75371, west of Kabardinka	105	21 August 1943	17:10	Il-2	PQ 34 Ost 88238, northwest of Stepanowka
81	21 April 1943	09:05	La-5?	PQ 34 Ost 85152, east of Abinskaja	106	21 August 1943	17:20	Il-2	PQ 34 Ost 88228, west of Stepanowka
82	8 May 1943	16:00	P-39	northwest of Krymskaja	107	20 September 1943	08:30	Il-2 m.H.	PQ 34 Ost 58131, northeast of Zaporizhia
83	5 July 1943	07:32	Yak-1?	PQ 35 Ost 61156, north of Tomarowka	108	24 September 1943	15:45	LaGG-3	PQ 34 Ost 58423, southeast of Zaporizhia
84	5 July 1943	11:32	La-5?	PQ 35 Ost 61331, north of Tomarowka	109	25 September 1943	16:35	P-39	PQ 34 Ost 58473, southeast of Zaporizhia
85	5 July 1943	18:00	Boston? (Note: According to Mathews and Foreman claimed as an Ilyushin Il-2.)	PQ 35 Ost 61552, southeast of Belgorod	110	26 September 1943	10:40	P-39	PQ 34 Ost 58571, southeast of Zaporizhia
86	6 July 1943	16:20	Il-2	PQ 35 Ost 61243, northwest of Belgorod	111	27 September 1943	16:00	La-5	PQ 34 Ost 59573, north of Zaporizhia
87	6 July 1943	18:00	Boston	PQ 35 Ost 61152, northwest of Belgorod	112	27 September 1943	16:30	P-39	PQ 34 Ost 58672, northwest of Bolschoj Tokmak
88	6 July 1943	18:05	Il-2	PQ 35 Ost 61132, northwest of Belgorod	113	5 October 1943	15:20	P-39	PQ 34 Ost 58813, west of Bolschoj Tokmak
89	8 July 1943	08:10	Il-2	PQ 35 Ost 61622, southeast of Belgorod	114	8 October 1943	08:40	La-5	PQ 34 Ost 66662, east of Saporoshskaja
90	8 July 1943	08:13	Il-2	PQ 35 Ost 61633, southeast of Belgorod	115	8 October 1943	15:10	La-5?	PQ 34 Ost 66651, northwest of Kossa Tschuschka
91	16 July 1943	06:45	La-5?	PQ 35 Ost 61251, northeast of Belgorod	116	23 October 1943	09:15	La-5?	PQ 34 Ost 58551, southeast of Wassijewka
92	16 July 1943	11:15	Il-2	PQ 35 Ost 61254, northeast of Belgorod	117	25 October 1943	14:25	La-5?	PQ 34 Ost 57154, west of Melitopol
93	16 July 1943	11:33	Il-2	PQ 35 Ost 61223, north of Belgorod	118	25 October 1943	14:30	La-5?	PQ 34 Ost 57324, south of Melitopol
– Stab of Jagdgeschwader 52 – Eastern Front — 1 January – 30 September 1944
119	21 March 1944	15:20? (Note: According to Mathews and Foreman claimed at 15:26.)	P-39	PQ 18631; 5 km (3.1 mi) northeast of Troitskoye	122	2 June 1944	11:32	Il-2 m.H.	PQ 78733; 15 km (9.3 mi) northwest of Iași
120	3 May 1944	15:00	Yak-7	PQ 68833 north of Târgu Frumos	123	8 June 1944	15:52	La-5	north of Iași; 15 km (9.3 mi) west of Țuțora
121	31 May 1944	18:55	P-39	PQ 78643; 10 km (6.2 mi) south of Țuțora	124	8 June 1944	19:20	P-39	PQ 78674; 8 km (5.0 mi) north of Iași
– Stab of Jagdgeschwader 54 – Eastern Front — 1 October 1944 – 8 Maz 1945
125	30 October 1944	10:05	P-39	45 km (28 mi) east-southeast of Libau					

=== Awards ===
- Iron Cross (1939)
  - 2nd class (15 September 1939)
  - 1st class (28 May 1940)
- Honour Goblet of the Luftwaffe (28 September 1940)
- German Cross in Gold on 10 July 1944 as Oberstleutnant in Jagdgeschwader 52
- Knight's Cross of the Iron Cross with Oak Leaves
  - Knight's Cross on 21 October 1940 as Hauptmann and Gruppenkommandeur of the II./Jagdgeschwader 54
  - 337th Oak Leaves on 25 November 1943 as Oberstleutnant and Geschwaderkommodore of Jagdgeschwader 52

== Notes ==
Military offices
Preceded by Major Herbert Ihlefeld	Commander of Jagdgeschwader 52; 1 November 1942 – 30 September 1944	Succeeded by Oberstleutnant Hermann Graf
Preceded by Oberstleutnant Anton Mader	Commander of Jagdgeschwader 54 Grünherz; 1 October 1944 – 8 May 1945	Succeeded by none
