= Jagdgeschwader 302 =

- Active: 1943–44
- Country: Nazi Germany
- Branch: Luftwaffe
- Type: Fighter Aircraft
- Role: Air superiority
- Size: Air Force Wing

Aircraft flown
- Fighter: Bf 109

Jagdgeschwader 302 (JG 302) was a Luftwaffe fighter-wing of World War II. JG 302 was formed on 1 November 1943 in Stade, Germany with a theoretical establishment of Stab and three Gruppen (groups) known as a "Wilde Sau" (wild boar) single-seat night fighter unit. After re-equipping with the Focke-Wulf 190 A-8, I./JG 302 was redesignated III./JG 301 on 30 September. JG 302 made a known total of at least 348 air victory claims

== Operations 1944 ==
The unit's primary mission, when formed in late 1943, was to intercept Royal Air Force (RAF) heavy bombers at night, flying modified single-engined day fighters. Eventually JG 302 also engaged United States Army Air Forces (USAAF) bombers by day. Initially, the pilots recruited were a mix of former bomber pilots and instructors, experienced in night and instrument flying.

During the night of 22 November, Hauptmann Heinrich Wurzer (26 victories, 24 by day, all with JG 302) shot down a RAF Lancaster bomber for his first victory and on 14 January 1944 was appointed Staffelkapitän of 1./JG 302.

On 6/7 February 1944 the Soviet Long-Range Bomber Force (ADD) launched a series of large scale air raids against Helsinki. Thus, early in 1944 elements of I./JG 302 were temporarily transferred North to Nachtjagd-Kommando Helsinki to assist in the city's defence. On 12 February 1944, 12 Messerschmitt Bf 109G-6/R6 night-fighters of I. Gruppe arrived at Malmi airfield from Jüterbog in Germany. Using the "Wilde Sau" method, I./JG 302 shot down two Soviet aircraft on 16/17 February. On 26/27 February the unit shot down another four bombers. In April 1944 I./JG 302 lost three planes in flying accidents and had had just seven fighters operational. The unit returned to Germany for Reich defence duties on 15 May 1944.

On 16 April 18 Bf 109G-6s of I gruppe intercepted USAAF bombers over Plattensee. Some six bombers, two P-51s and a P-38 were claimed for three JG 302 fighters downed.

On 2 July I./ JG 302, led by Hptm. Richard Lewens, attacked 603 B-24 Liberators of the 15th Air Force, attacking targets near Budapest; they were escorted by 270 fighters. Combats ranged from Budapest into Southern Slovakia. I./ JG 302 claimed 19 B-24s and two P-51s, but lost 12 Bf 109s and 10 crewmen killed in the battle.

Unteroffizier Willi Reschke was JG 302's most prolific ace, scoring 14 of his eventual 26 combat claims with JG 302. He achieved his first success when he shot down two B-24s over Budapest on 2 July. Reschke rammed a B-24 on 7 July when his guns malfunctioned, successfully baling out of his stricken fighter.

On 8 July 1944 I./JG 302 took off from Götzendorf under Hpt. Heinrich Würzer to intercept 15th Air Force heavy bombers over Bratislava and Vienna. The unit claimed nine B-24s and three B-17s, with I./ JG 302 losing one pilot killed and four wounded. On this day Hpt. Wurzer shot down two B-24s. However, he was wounded in the right arm during this combat and had to make an emergency landing with his Bf 109 G-6 near the Götzendorft airfield.

On 25 July 1944 420 B-17s and B-24s bombed the tank factories in Linz while other bombers hit the Villach marshalling yards. Nearly 200 Luftwaffe fighters opposed the attacks, drawn from II./ JG 27, Stab, I. and II./JG 300 and I./ JG 302. 16 bombers were downed, while the USAAF bombers and escort fighters claimed over 60 fighters shot down. I./ JG 302 lost four killed, two wounded, and 12 planes lost for six bombers claimed destroyed.

On 24 August, Reschke claimed a further B-24 but shortly afterwards, during an attack on a second, his aircraft was hit by return fire, and he baled out when P-51 fighters attacked his Bf 109.

Hpt. Wurzer was appointed Gruppenkommandeur of I./JG 302 on 28 August 1944. In September I./JG 302 was reformed as III./JG 301 and re-equipped with the Fw 190 A-8. A new commander, Ritterkreuz holder Hpt. Wilhelm Fulda (one victory), was appointed to lead the unit.

== Commanding officers ==
- Major Ewald Janssen, November 1943 – February 1944
- Major Kurd Peters, February 1944 – June 1944
