= Jagdgeschwader 76 =

- Active: 1939–40, 1944–45
- Country: Nazi Germany
- Branch: Luftwaffe
- Type: Fighter Aircraft
- Role: Air superiority
- Size: Air Force Wing

Commanders
- Notable commanders: Anton Hackl

Aircraft flown
- Fighter: Bf 109

Jagdgeschwader 76 (JG 76) was a Luftwaffe fighter-wing of World War II. JG 76 was first formed in 1939 in Wien-Aspern with only I. Gruppe (1st group). The Geschwader was renamed II./Jagdgeschwader 54 on 4 July 1940.

The Geschwader was recreated in July 1944 at Salzburg from the Stab/Zerstörergeschwader 76. From 22 July 1944 to August the gruppe was based at Rotenburg and Athis in France.

== Operational history ==
The unit participated in the invasion of Poland, claiming 6 aircraft shot down. JG 76 then flew operations through the summer of 1940, and during the Battle of France the unit claimed some 69 Allied aircraft downed, with Ltn. Roloff von Aspern (8), Ltn. Hans Philipp and Ofw. Max Stotz (both 7) Oblt. Dietrich Hrabak (6) the top scorers.

JG 76 saw very limited combat in the autumn of 1944, mainly during operations in response to Operation Market Garden. Some 46 aircraft were claimed shot down during 1944-45. Based in Athis, France, on 25 August 1944 III./JG 76 were intercepted by USAAF P-51 Mustang fighters and Gruppenkommandeur Oblt. Egon Albrecht-Lemke was shot down and killed in his Bf 109G-14 over Creil. Hpt. Hans Morr took command of the gruppe. On 28 August 1944 six USAAF P-38s were claimed by III./JG 76 over Creil. 11 September saw 5 P-51s claimed downed near Kassel, while on 12 September 1944 seven B-17s were shot down.

19 September 1944 26 Bf 109Gs of I./JG 76 saw action over Arnhem and lost two aircraft, in return Uffz.Ibold of 2./JG 76 claimed a P-51. The next day 15 fighters made low-level strafing attacks on troops around Nijmegen. No losses were suffered. On 24 September 26 Bf 109's joined III./JG 11 and IV./JG 54 as part of the temporary tactical formation Gefechstverband Späthe in anti-fighter sweeps over the Netherlands. Two fighters were lost on 26 September flying ground attack missions.

On 27 September 1944 a formation of some 29 I./JG 76 Bf 109s were attacked by No 412 and 443 RCAF Spitfires over the Arnhem-Nijmegen area. Five Bf 109s were lost in return for five Spitfires claimed shot down. On 29 September 1944 eight further aircraft were lost, in return for six Spitfires and a P-47 claimed, Ltn. Böer claiming two. Ltn. Fick, of 2./JG 76 claimed a Spitfire on 2 October 1944. Thirteen P-47s were claimed through October.

IV./JG 300 was formed from elements of I./JG 76 at the beginning of October 1944. The unit was disbanded on 24 April 1945 in Wien.

== Commanding officers ==
- Major Anton Hackl, 21 July 1944 – 7 October 1944
- Major Ernst Düllberg, 7 October 1944 – April 1945
