= Kurd Peters =

German fighter ace and Knight's Cross recipient

- Born: 7 August 1914; Braunschweig
- Died: 24 July 1957 (aged 42); Fürstenfeldbruck
- Military career
- Allegiance: Nazi Germany (to 1945); West Germany
- Branch: Luftwaffe; German Air Force
- Rank: Major (Wehrmacht); Major (Bundeswehr)
- Unit: Aufklärungsgruppe 22
- Commands: JG 300, JG 302
- Conflicts: World War II: Defense of the Reich
- Awards: Knight's Cross of the Iron Cross

Kurd Peters (7 August 1914 – 24 July 1957) was a German officer (Major) in the Luftwaffe during World War II, and a recipient of the Knight's Cross of the Iron Cross of Nazi Germany. He was credited with four aerial victories in Defense of the Reich actions.

In November 1943. Peters was appointed Gruppenkommandeur (group commander) of II. Gruppe of Jagdgeschwader 300 (JG 300—300th Fighter Wing). On 21 June 1944, Peters claimed three aerial victories. His first two claims of the day were in fact Herausschüsse (separation shots)—a severely damaged heavy bomber forced to separate from its combat box which was counted as an aerial victory. A Consolidated B-24 Liberator bomber was forced from its combat box southeast of Berlin at 10:07. The second B-24 bomber was then forced from formation at 10:15 20 kilometers (12 miles) southwest of Berlin. At 10:20, he shot down a B-24 bomber near Adlershof. On 29 June, Peters was shot down in his Focke-Wulf Fw 190 A-7 (Werknummer 340303—factory number) near Laucha an der Unstrut and Naumburg. He baled out and was wounded. Command of II. Gruppe was then transferred to Major Alfred Lindenberger.

== Summary of career ==
=== Aerial victory claims ===
Chronicle of aerial victories
This along with the * (asterisk) indicates an Herausschuss (separation shot)—a severely damaged heavy bomber forced to separate from his combat box which was counted as an aerial victory.
Claim	Date	Time	Type	Location	Claim	Date	Time	Type	Location
– Stab III. Gruppe of Jagdgeschwader 300 "Wilde Sau" – Night Fighter
1	23 May 1944	00:52	four-engined bomber	Dortmund					
– Stab II. Gruppe of Jagdgeschwader 300 "Wilde Sau" – Defense of the Reich — 28 May – 29 June 1944
2	21 June 1944	10:07	B-24*	southeast of Berlin	4	21 June 1944	10:15	B-24*	Berlin-Adlershof
3	21 June 1944	10:15	B-24*	20 km (12 mi) southwest of Berlin					

== Awards and decorations ==
- Honour Goblet of the Luftwaffe (5 October 1942)
- German Cross in Gold on 20 October 1942 as Hauptmann in the 1.(Fern)/Aufklärungsgruppe 22
- Knight's Cross of the Iron Cross on 29 October 1944 as Major and Gruppenkommandeur of the II.(Sturm)/Jagdgeschwader 300 (Note: According to Scherzer as Gruppenkommandeur of the II./Jagdgeschwader 300.)

== Notes ==
Military offices
Preceded by Oberstleutnant Ewald Janssen	Commander of Jagdgeschwader 302; February 1944 – June 1944	Succeeded by disbanded
Preceded by Oberstleutnant Walther Dahl	Acting commander of Jagdgeschwader 300; December 1944 – January 1945	Succeeded by Major Anton Hackl
