= Staffelkapitän =

Command appointment in the air force units of German-speaking countries

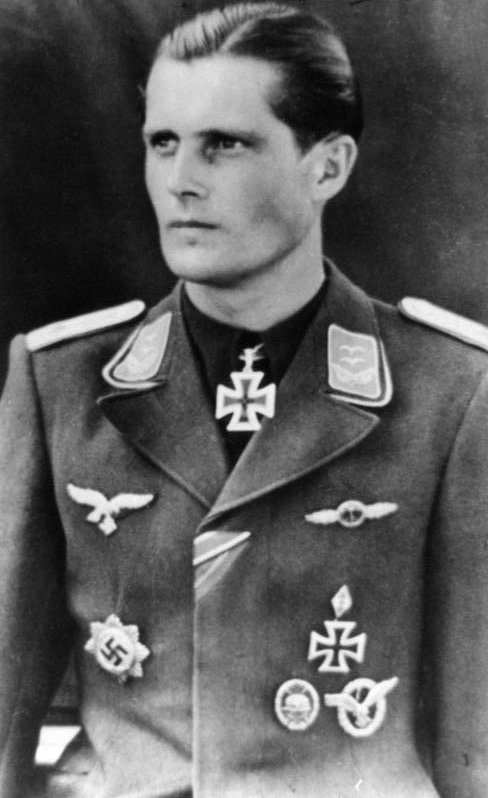
Oberleutnant Egon Albrecht, Staffelführer in Zerstörergeschwader 76.

Staffelkapitän is a command appointment, rather than a military rank, in the air force units of German-speaking countries.

The rank normally held by a Staffelkapitän has changed over time. In the present-day German Luftwaffe – part of the Bundeswehr – the position is usually held by an Oberstleutnant (lieutenant colonel) or Major.

== World War II ==
In the Luftwaffe of the World War II Wehrmacht, a full-strength Staffel had nine to 12 operational aircraft; as such it was slightly smaller than a full-strength squadron (at least 12 aircraft) in the air forces of other countries. Hence a Luftwaffe Staffelkapitän usually held the rank of an Oberleutnant or Hauptmann. (In other countries, a squadron was normally commanded by, at the very least, a Major or direct equivalent rank, such as an RAF Squadron Leader.)

An acting or newly-appointed Staffelkapitän, for the first weeks of their assignment, was known as Staffelführer ("Staffel leader"). In this sense a non-commissioned officer might also be referred to as a Staffelführer. (As such the Luftwaffe title differed significantly from the SS rank of Staffelführer.)

== See also ==
- Organization of the Luftwaffe (1933–1945)
