= Gmina Maszewo =

Gmina Maszewo may refer to either of the following administrative districts in Poland:

- Gmina Maszewo, West Pomeranian Voivodeship
- Gmina Maszewo, Lubusz Voivodeship
