= Lubogoszcz =

Lubogoszcz may refer to the following places:

- Lubogoszcz, Gmina Maszewo, Krosno County in Lubusz Voivodeship (west Poland)
- Lubogoszcz, Wschowa County in Lubusz Voivodeship (west Poland)
- Lubogoszcz, West Pomeranian Voivodeship (north-west Poland)
