= Hohenhof =

Coordinates: 51°21′34″N 7°30′49″E

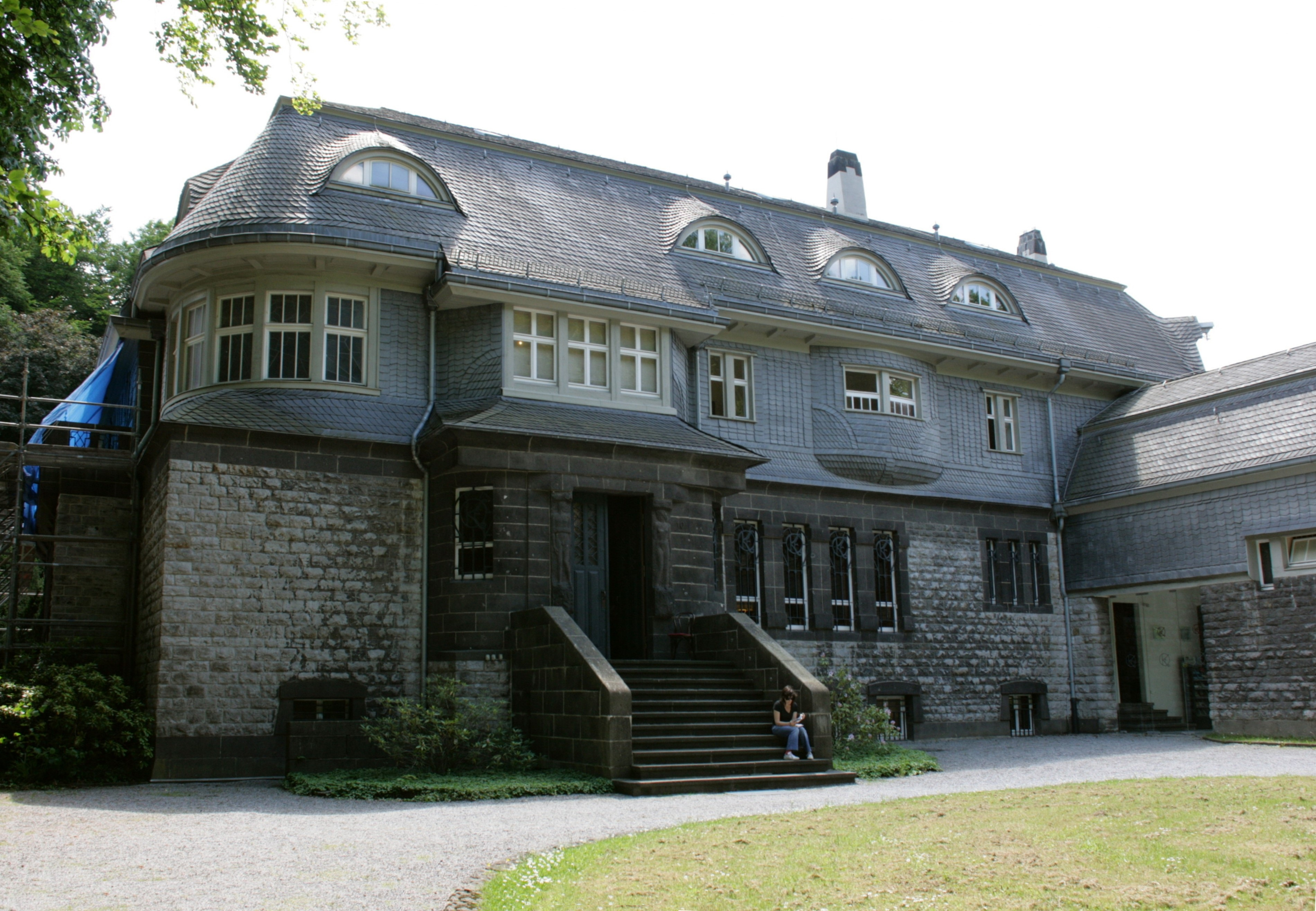
Forecourt of Hohenhof in 2010

Hohenhof is a 1908-built Art Nouveau villa, located within Gartenstadt Hohenhagen in the city of Hagen, Germany. The villa was designed by Belgian architect Henry van de Velde as a Gesamtkunstwerk - incorporating shell, accessories, furnishings, landscape and all into the building's design.

The client, German industrialist and arts patron Karl Ernst Osthaus, used the building as his family home until his death in 1921. His children sold the estate to the city of Hagen under the condition to maintain the overall design character. Already beginning in the early 1920s and until the late 1970s, the mansion underwent a number of use-changes. Since then it has been renovated and today houses a publicly open museum.

== See also ==
- Karl Ernst Osthaus-Museum
