= Karl Ernst Osthaus =

German patron of avant-garde art and architecture

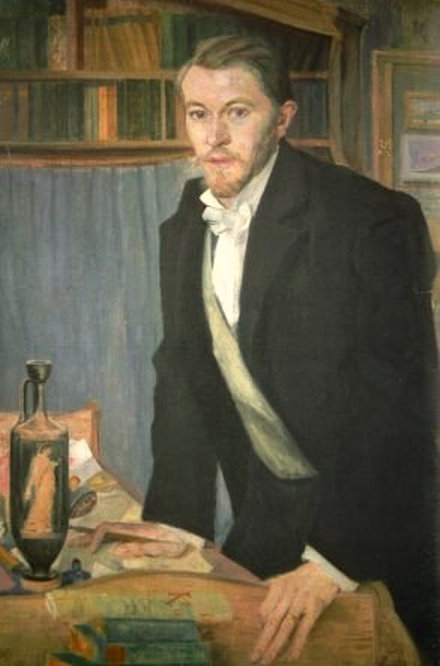
- Osthaus portrayed by Gerhardi c. 1903
- Born: Karl Ernst Osthaus

Karl Ernst Osthaus (15 April 1874 – 25 March 1921) was a German businessman, heir, patron and art collector primarily of avant-garde art. His collection is currently housed at Osthaus-Museum Hagen.

== Early life and education ==
Osthaus was born 15 April 1874 in Hagen, Province of Westphalia, to Carl Ernst August Osthaus (1842–1902), a banker, and Selma Emilie Osthaus (née Funcke; 1852–1874), an heiress to screw fortune, into an Evangelical family.

His parents rose to considerable affluence through the growing economy in the Ruhr Valley. His father was an associate at Essener-Credit-Anstalt and also a private investor who held participations in a variety of industries such as steel and textile manufacturing.

After completing his Abitur, he was sent to one of the textile mills his father was a shareholder in, but owing to a nervous breakdown, he decided to pursue academic studies instead. In 1893, he enrolled into studies of art history and philosophy, and studied at universities in Kiel, Berlin, Strasbourg, Vienna, Bonn and Munich, ultimately dropping out in 1896.

== Career ==
In 1896, Osthaus inherited 3 million Goldmark (approximately 30 million Euro in modern equivalency), from the estate of his grandparents, which ultimately enabled him to pursue his interest in art collecting and starting a museum.

In 1902, Osthaus founded the Folkwang Museum in Hagen, Germany. After his death, the city of Hagen was unable to purchase the museum collection and in 1922 Hagen was outbid by the neighbouring city of Essen which now houses the Folkwang Collection. A separate museum survives in Hagen, the Karl Ernst Osthaus-Museum.

Osthaus was a notable patron of the European avant-garde. Although in his early life he tended to German nationalism, active in the Alldeutscher Verband, the Pan-German League, and supporting figures such as the Austrian Georg von Schönerer, Osthaus's nationalism became tempered with interest in transforming Hagen and Germany into the leading centers of the European avant-garde. Under the guidance of Henry van de Velde, Osthaus began a collection of European modernist painting that comprised one of the first purely modernist collections to be open to the public. The Folkwang in Hagen sponsored some of the earliest exhibits of Expressionist painting, and the collection early on included works by Ernst Ludwig Kirchner, Emil Nolde, and Christian Rohlfs and work by non-German artists such as Aristide Maillol, Johan Thorn Prikker, and Henri Matisse.

Osthaus also attempted to spark interest in avant-garde architecture in Hagen. In this regard, he encountered many frustrations. In some ways, the story of the projects that were not built is more interesting than the projects that were built. Major architects including Henry van de Velde, Richard Riemerschmid, Peter Behrens, and Walter Gropius were all active in Hagen. A small artist colony also emerged including the sculptor Milly Steger, the Dutch artist and theosophist J.L.M. Lauweriks, and a score of figures important for Hagen's local cultural history.

== Personal life ==
In 1899, Osthaus married Gertrud Maria Louise Colsman (1880–1975), the daughter of a textile manufacturer from Langenberg. They had five children;

- Eberhardt Ernst Osthaus (1900–1945)
- Waldemar Osthaus (1901–1927)
- Manfred Osthaus (1903–1982)
- Helga Osthaus (1905–1986), married Wolfgang Ernst Otto Laves (1901–1973)
- Imogen Osthaus (1909–)

Osthaus's Jugendstil villa, the Hohenhof, is one of the most important examples of bourgeois Jugendstil architecture in Europe. It was recently renovated and is open to the public.
