= Rzeczyca, Gmina Maszewo =

Rzeczyca
- Village
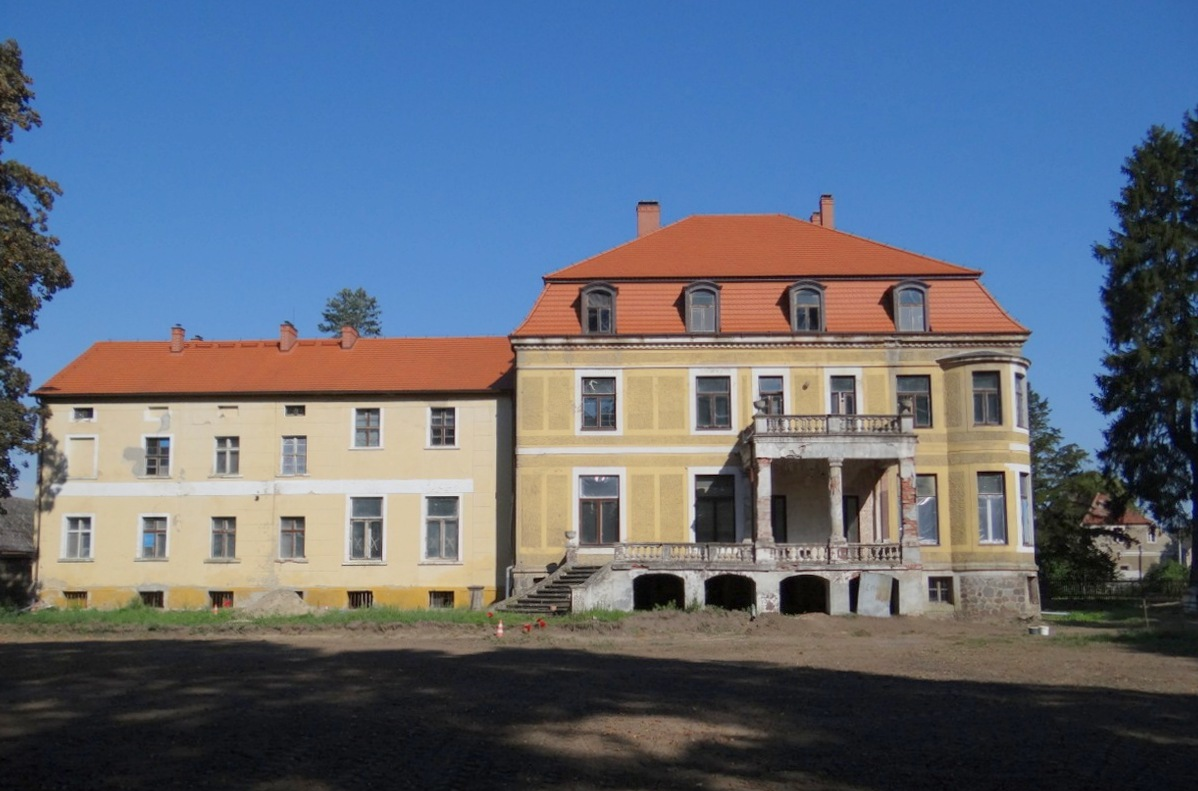
- Palace

- Location within Poland
- Coordinates: 52°10′19″N 14°53′53″E
- Country: Poland
- Voivodeship: Lubusz
- County: Krosno
- Gmina: Maszewo
- Population: 60

Rzeczyca ([ʐɛˈt͡ʂɨt͡sa]; German: Riesnitz) is a village in the administrative district of Gmina Maszewo, within Krosno County, Lubusz Voivodeship, Poland.
