= Rybaki, Lubusz Voivodeship =

Rybaki
- Village
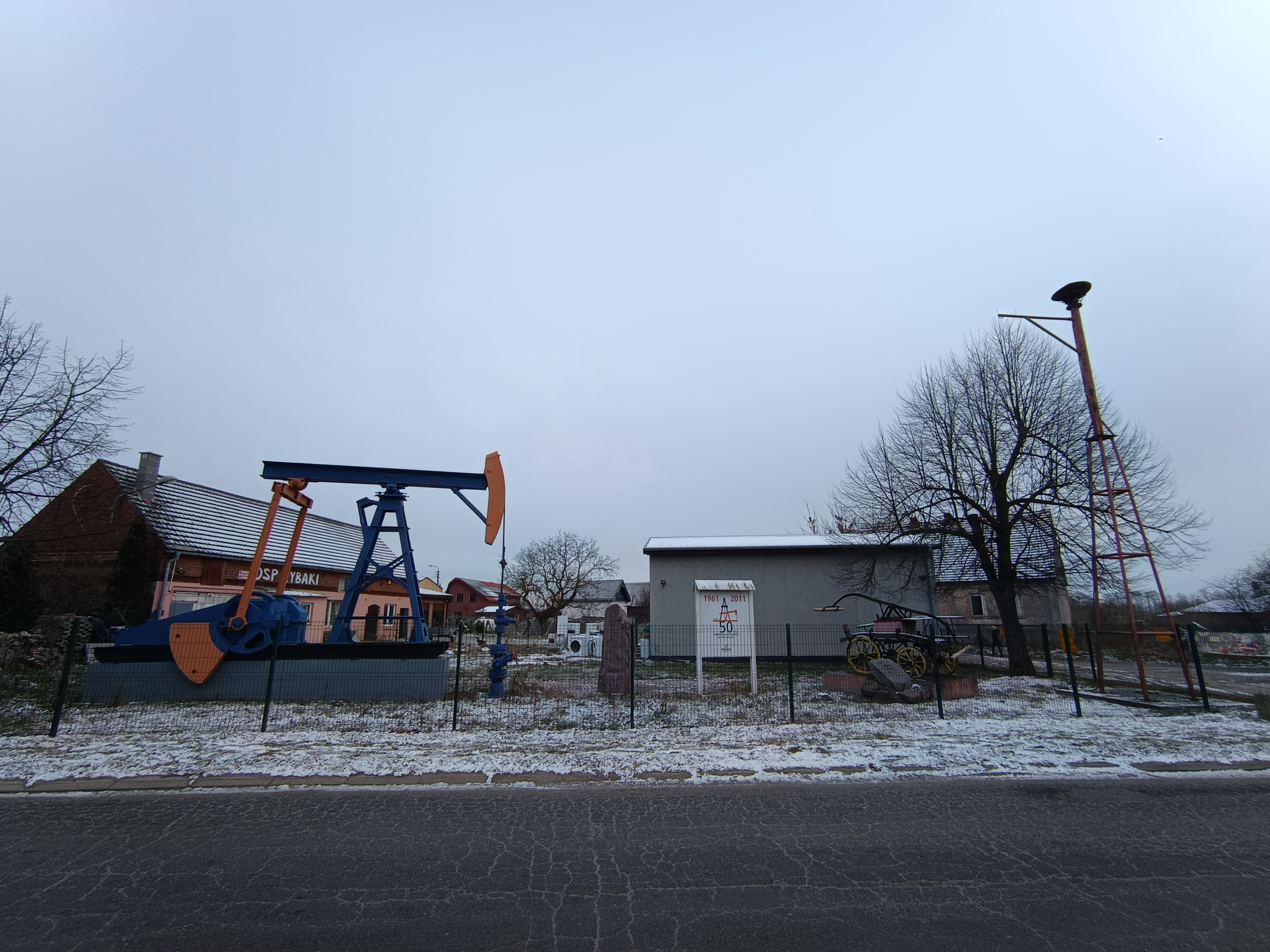

- Location within Poland
- Coordinates: 52°5′N 14°52′E
- Country: Poland
- Voivodeship: Lubusz
- County: Krosno
- Gmina: Maszewo

Rybaki ([rɨˈbaki]; German: Schönfeld) is a village in the administrative district of Gmina Maszewo, within Krosno County, Lubusz Voivodeship, in western Poland.
