= Korczyców =

- Village
- Location within Poland
- Coordinates: 52°07′48″N 14°55′51″E
- Country: Poland
- Voivodeship: Lubusz
- County: Krosno
- Gmina: Maszewo

Korczyców ([kɔrˈt͡ʂɨt͡suf]; German: Kurtschow) is a village in the administrative district of Gmina Maszewo, within Krosno County, Lubusz Voivodeship, in western Poland.
