= Henry van de Velde =

Belgian painter, architect, interior designer, and art theorist

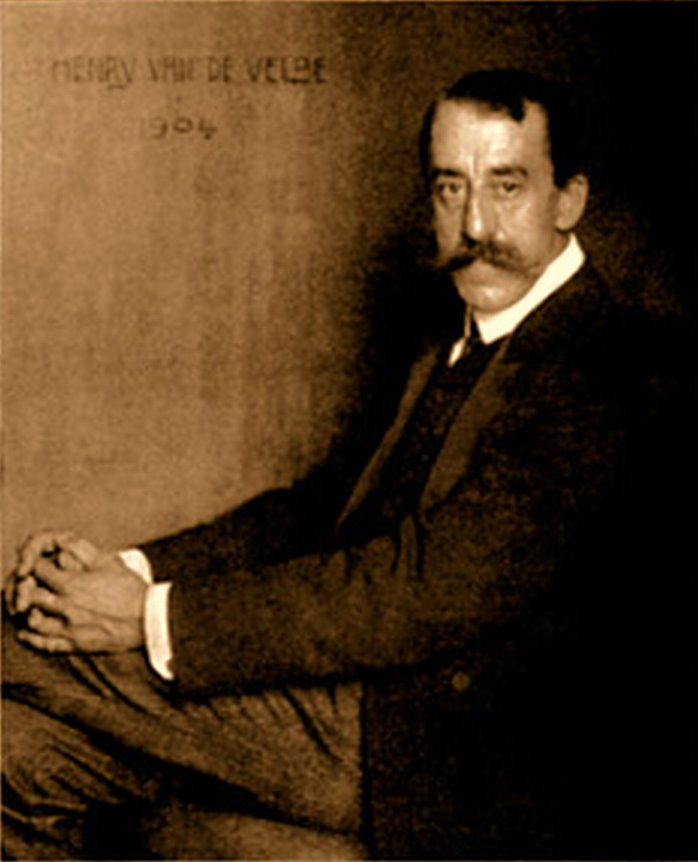
- Henry van de Velde; portrait by Nicola Perscheid (1904)
- Born: Henry Clemens van de Velde; 3 April 1863; Antwerp, Belgium
- Died: 15 October 1957 (aged 94); Oberägeri, Switzerland
- Occupation: Architect
- Spouse: Maria Sèthe (m. 1894)
- Buildings: Villa Bloemenwerf in Uccle (1895); Kunstgewerbeschule in Weimar (1907); Deutsche Werkbund Theatre in Cologne (1914); Boekentoren at Ghent University Library (1933)

Henry Clemens van de Velde (Dutch: [ˈɦɛnri vɑn də ˈvɛldə]; 3 April 1863 – 15 October 1957) was a Belgian painter, architect, interior designer, and art theorist. Together with Victor Horta and Paul Hankar, he is considered one of the founders of Art Nouveau in Belgium. He worked in Paris with Siegfried Bing, the founder of the first gallery of Art Nouveau in Paris. Van de Velde spent the most important part of his career in Germany and became a major figure in the German Jugendstil. He had a decisive influence on German architecture and design at the beginning of the 20th century.

== Early life ==
Henry Clemens van de Velde was born in Antwerp, Belgium, where he studied painting under Charles Verlat at the Royal Academy of Fine Arts, Antwerp. He then went on to a year's study with the painter Carolus-Duran in Paris.

As a young painter, he was strongly influenced by Paul Signac and Georges Seurat and soon adopted a neo-impressionist style, and pointillism. In 1889, he became a member of the Brussels-based artist group "Les XX". After Vincent van Gogh exhibited some work on the yearly exhibition of Les XX, Van de Velde became one of the first artists to be influenced by the Dutch painter. During this period he developed a lasting friendship with the painter Théo van Rysselberghe and the sculptor Constantin Meunier.

== Career ==
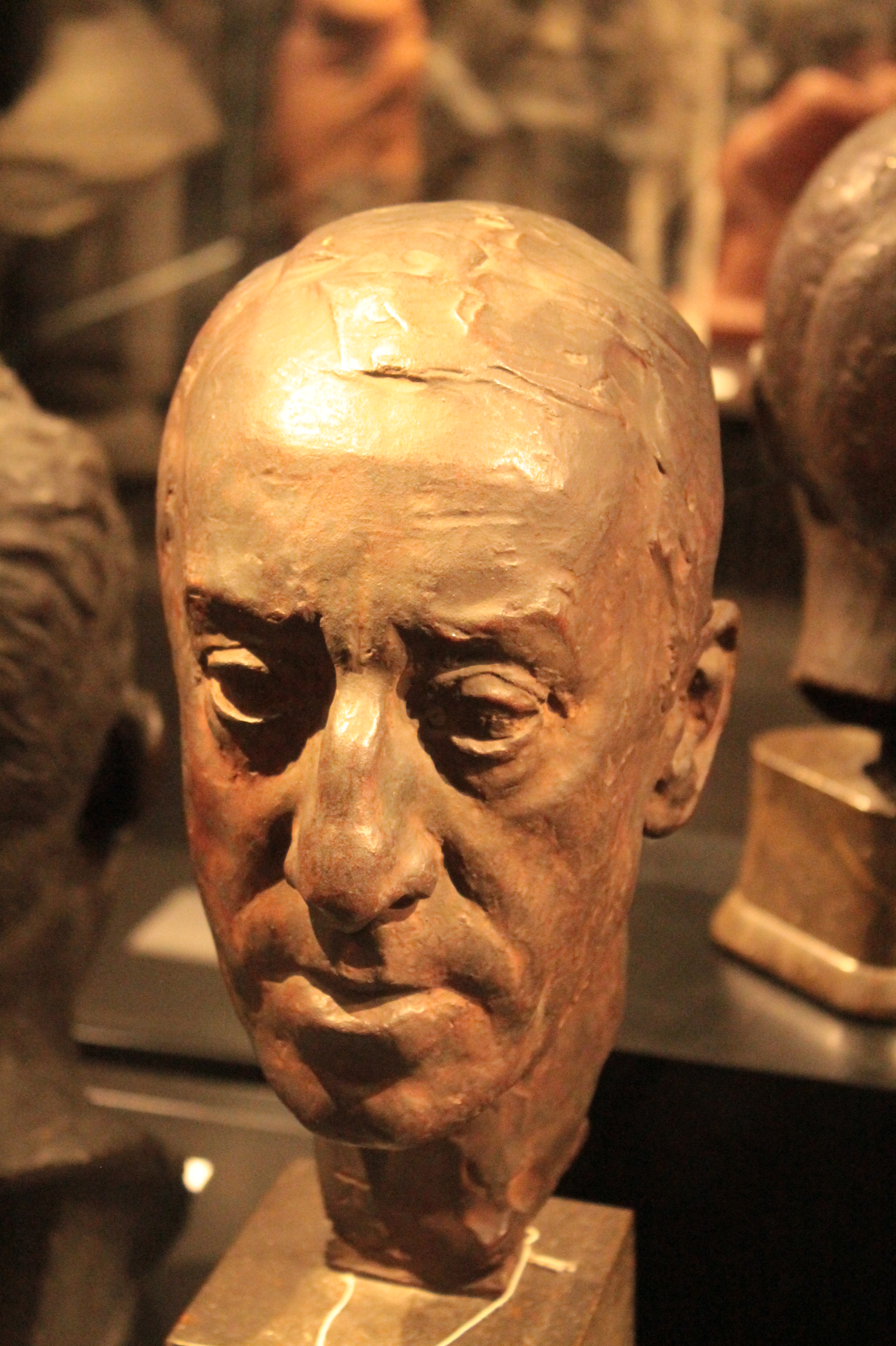
Henry van de Velde by Georg Kolbe, 1913, Albertinum gallery, Dresden

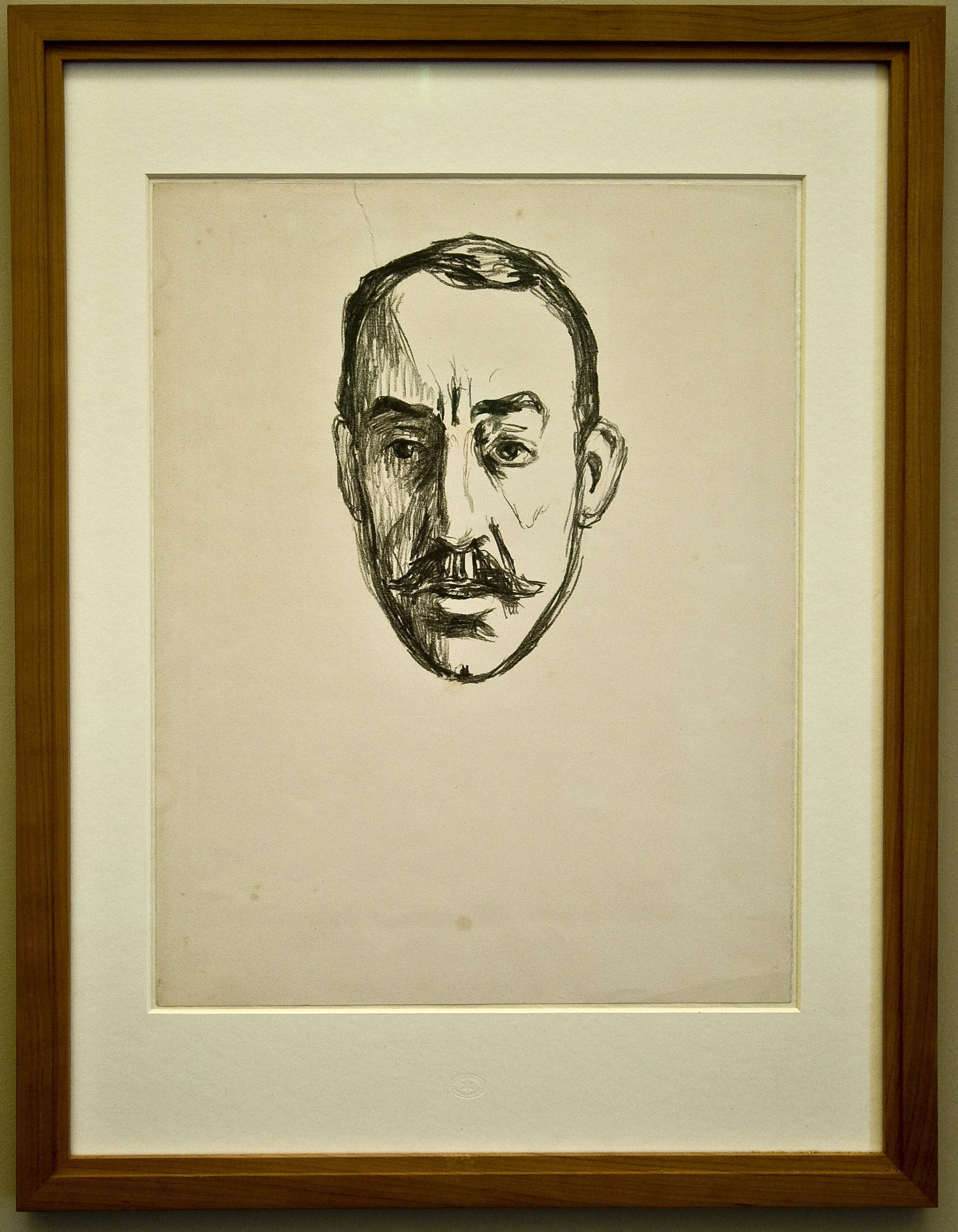
Henry van de Velde by Edvard Munch

In 1890, Van de Velde wrote that "there will be no place in the society of the future for anything which is not of use to everyone."

In 1892, he abandoned painting, devoting his time to the arts of decoration and interior design (silver and goldsmith's trade, chinaware and cutlery, fashion design, carpet and fabric design). His meeting with Maria Sèthe, his future wife, was instrumental in this change. They collaborated on a number of projects together, including designing wallpapers and female clothing. Their first house, the Villa Bloemenwerf in Uccle, was Van de Velde's first attempt at architecture and was inspired by the British Arts and Crafts Movement. Its exterior closely resembled the Red House of William Morris. Maria Sèthe designed the garden surrounding the house.

Van de Velde also designed interiors and furniture for the influential art gallery "L'Art Nouveau" of Samuel Bing in Paris in 1895, the shop from which Art Nouveau took its name. He participated in Bing's pavilion at the Paris Universal Exposition of 1900 and showed his own work.

Van de Velde was strongly influenced by John Ruskin and William Morris's English Arts and Crafts movement and he was one of the first architects or furniture designers to apply curved lines in an abstract style, rather than based on nature.

Van de Velde's design work became known in Germany through periodicals such as Innen-Dekoration. As a result, he received commissions for interior designs in Berlin. Around the turn of the century, he designed Villa Leuring in the Netherlands, and Villa Esche in Chemnitz, two works that show his Art Nouveau style in architecture. He also designed the interior of the Folkwang Museum in Hagen (today the building houses the Karl Ernst Osthaus-Museum) and the Nietzsche Archive in Weimar.

In 1899, he settled in Weimar, Germany, where he was employed as artistic advisor to William Ernest, Grand Duke Saxe-Weimar-Eisenach. In 1907, he established the Grand-Ducal School of Arts and Crafts, under the patronage of the Grand Duke. Van de Velde designed the school's building and was the school's first director. He stepped down during World War I due to his Belgian citizenship and suggested that architect Walter Gropius succeed him. In 1919, the School merged with the Weimar Art Academy to form the modernist art school, Bauhaus.

Although a Belgian, van de Velde played an important role in the German Jugendstil. In 1907, he co-founded the German Werkbund, an association to help improve and promote German design by establishing close relations between industry and designers. Van de Velde was a proponent of incorporating logic into all facets of design, taking inspiration from engineers application of reason and calculation.

During World War I, van de Velde, as a foreign national, was obliged to leave Weimar (although on good terms with the Weimar government) and returned to his native Belgium. Later, he lived in Switzerland and in the Netherlands where he designed the Kröller-Müller Museum in Otterlo.

In 1925, he was appointed professor at the Ghent University Institute of Art History and Archaeology, where he lectured architecture and applied arts from 1926 to 1936. He was instrumental in founding in Brussels, in 1926, today's architecture and visual arts school La Cambre, under the name of Institut supérieur des Arts décoratifs.

== Modernism ==
Van de Velde continued his practice in architecture and design, which had demarcated itself significantly from the Art Nouveau phase, whose popularity was in decline by 1910. During this period, he mentored the architect Victor Bourgeois.

In 1933, he was commissioned to design the new building for the university library (the Boekentoren). Construction started in 1936, but the work would not be completed until the end of the Second World War. For budget reasons, the eventual construction did not entirely match the original design. For instance, the reading room floor was executed in marble instead of the black rubber Van de Velde originally intended. He was also later involved in the construction of the Ghent University Hospital.

== Death ==
Van de Velde died, aged 94, in Zürich, Switzerland.

== Auctions and exhibitions ==
On 12 October 2005, a teapot designed by Van de Velde made €170,000 at a public auction at the Brussels Beaux-Arts auction house – eleven times the opening bid. It is a teapot on a chafing dish, with a wooden handle, resting on an oval basis and made of silver-plated brass. During an Art Nouveau and Design exhibition at Brussels' Cinquantenaire Museum in 2005, Van de Velde's tea set, two china plates and a silver dish were badly damaged in an unfortunate accident. The silver candle stand remained unharmed. The pieces had been given on temporary loan by the Kaiser Wilhelm Museum in Krefeld, the Museum für Angewandte Kunst in Cologne and a private collector.

== The Manuscript on Ornament ==
Van De Velde played the role in elaborating an aesthetic theory a synthesis of the two opposite poles of rational conception associated with particular understanding of the ornamental function. The Manuscript on Ornament sheds further light on this aesthetic theory, and the role played therein by the notion of ornament.

== Selected works ==
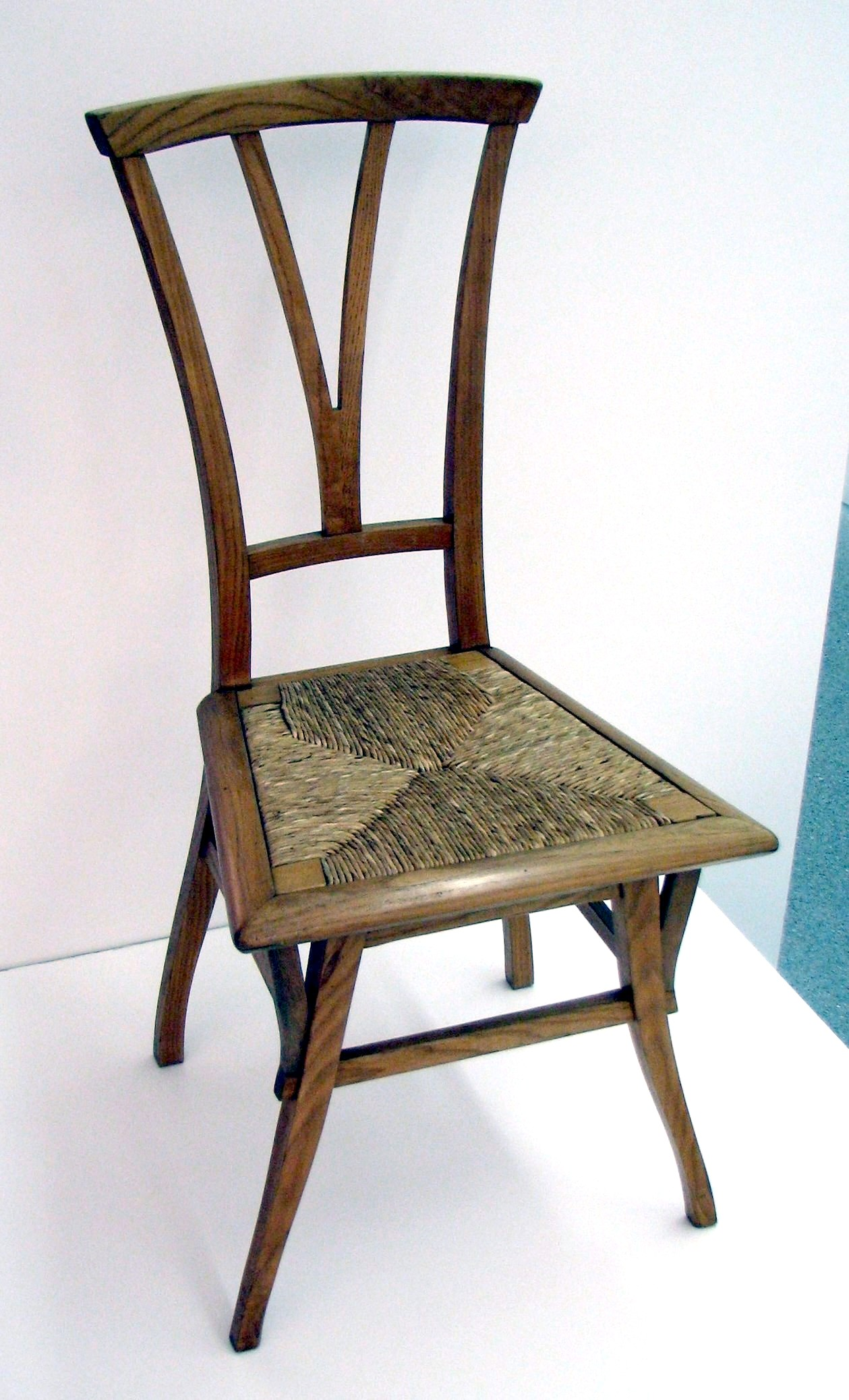
Chair designed for "Villa Bloemenwerf", 1895

- 1895–96: "Villa Bloemenwerf", Van de Velde's first private residence, in Uccle (Brussels), Belgium
- 1895: Interior decoration of Siegfried Bing's art Gallery "Maison de l'art nouveau" in Paris, France
- 1898: Monument to Count Frédéric de Mérode in Brussels, Belgium
- 1900–02: Interior of the Folkwang Museum in Hagen, Germany
- 1902–03, 1911 (extension): "Villa Esche" in Chemnitz, Germany
- 1903: Extension and interior decoration of the Nietzsche Archive in Weimar, Germany
- 1906–07: Clubhouse of the "Chemnitzer Lawn-Tennis-Club" in Chemnitz, Germany (demolished)
- 1907–08: "Hohenhof", mansion for Karl Ernst Osthaus in Hagen, Germany
- 1907–08: "Haus Hohe Pappeln", Van de Velde's private residence in Weimar, Germany
- 1909–11: "Ernst-Abbe-Denkmal", memorial for Ernst Abbe in Jena, Germany (in collaboration with the sculptors Max Klinger and Constantin Meunier)
- 1912–13: Palace for Graf Dürckheim in Weimar, Germany
- 1913–14: "Werkbund-Theater", theatre at the Deutsche Werkbund exhibition in Cologne, Germany
- 1913–14: "Villa Schulenburg" in Gera, Germany
- 1913–14: Wohnhaus für den Fabrikanten Dr. Theo Koerner in Chemnitz, Germany
- 1927–28: "La Nouvelle Maison", Van de Velde's private residence in Tervuren, Belgium
- 1929: "Wolfers House" in Ixelles (Brussels), Belgium
- 1929–31: Home for the elderly of the 'Minna und James Heinemann-Stiftung' in Hanover, Germany
- 1933–35: Polyclinic and "Villa Landing" for Dr. Adriaan Martens in Astene near Ghent, Belgium
- 1933–38: Library of Ghent University with "Boekentoren" in Ghent, Belgium
- 1936–42: "Technische School", school building in Leuven, Belgium
- 1937: Belgian Pavilion at the 1937 Paris Exposition
- 1937: "Station Blankenberge", railway station in Blankenberge, Belgium
- 1939: Belgian Building for the 1939 New York World's Fair, now at Virginia Union University in Richmond, Virginia
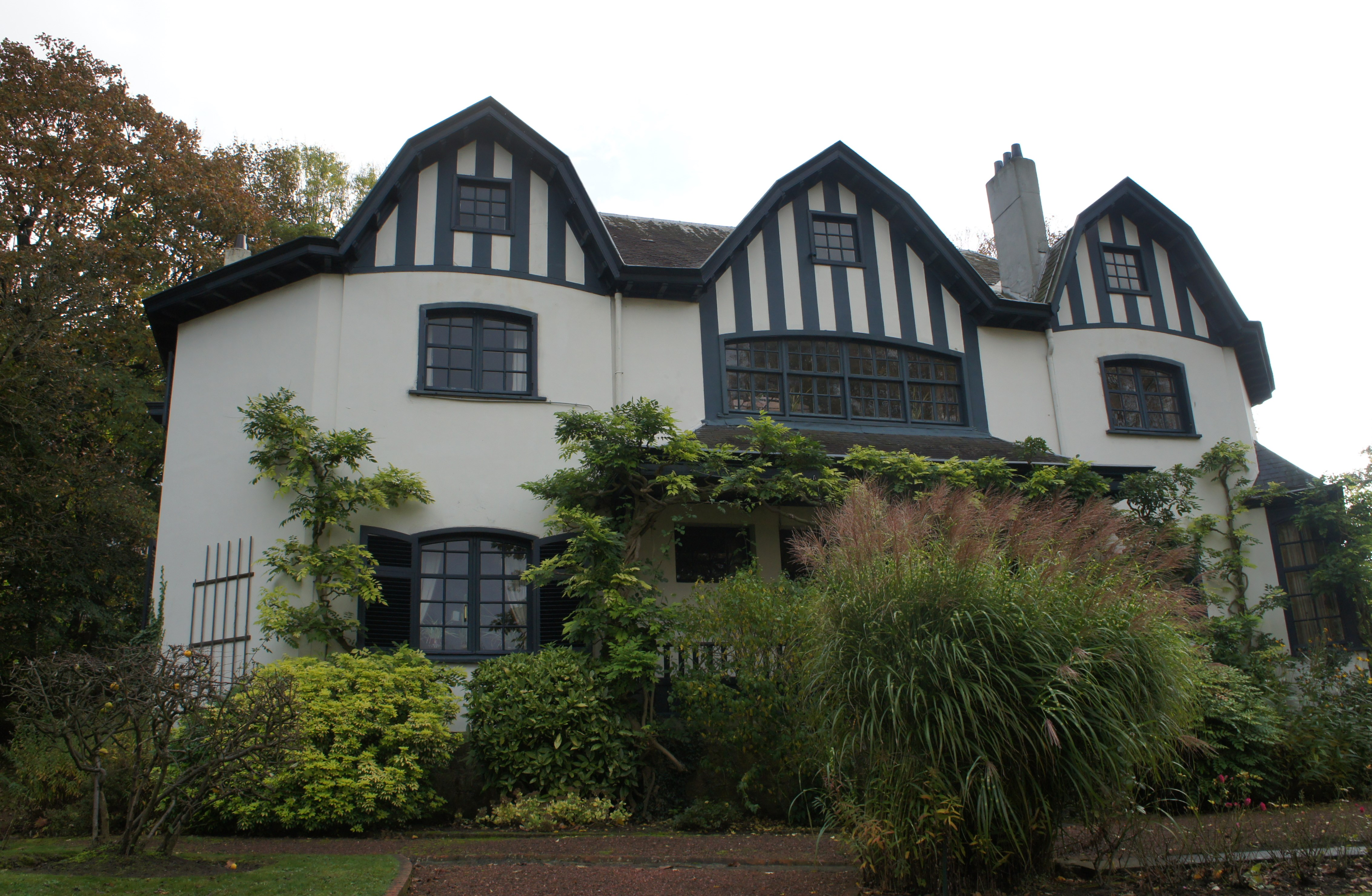
Villa Bloemenwerf, Uccle (Brussels), Belgium

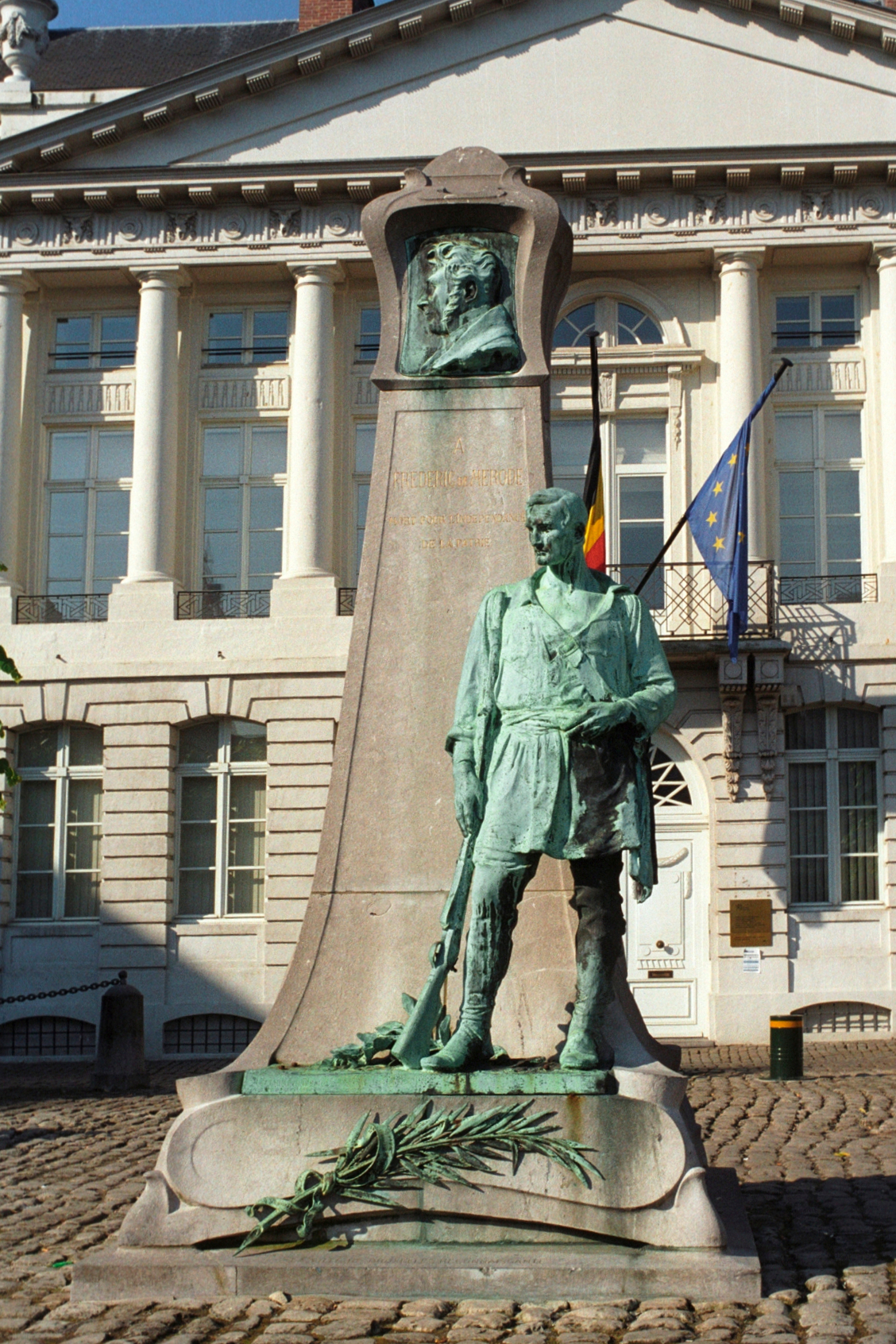
Monument to Count Frédéric de Mérode, Brussels, Belgium

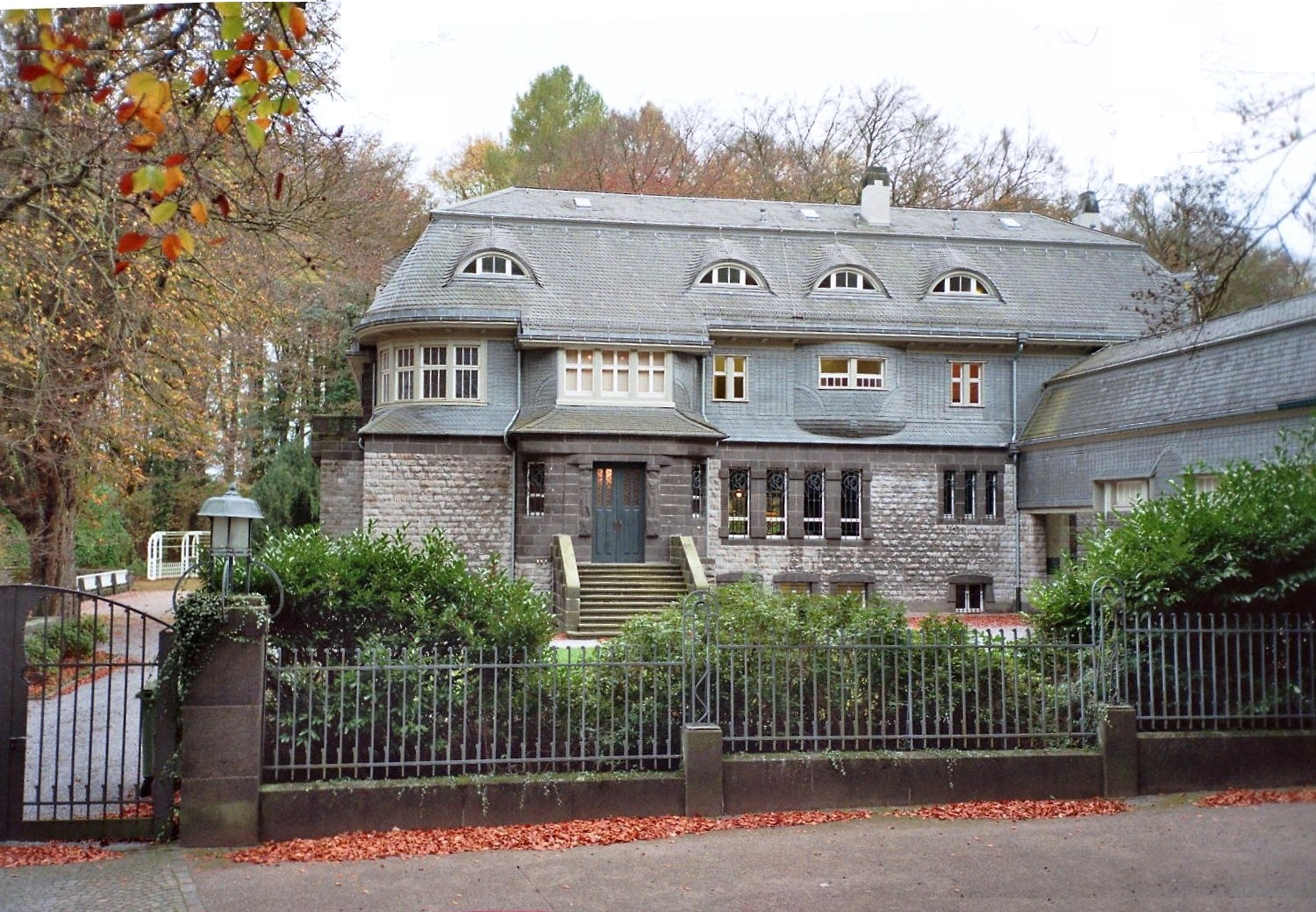
Villa Hohenhof, Hagen, Germany

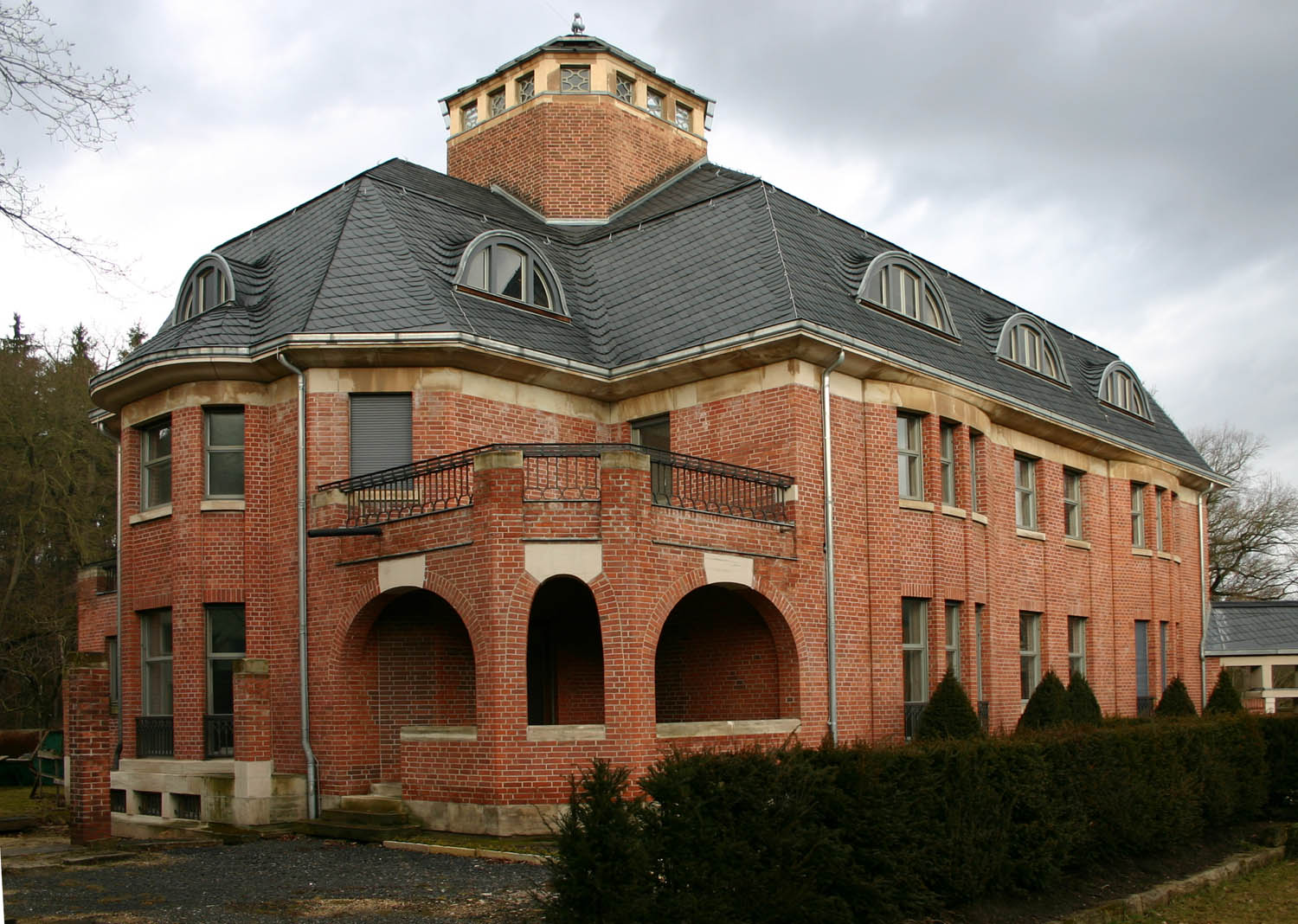
Villa Schulenburg, Gera, Germany

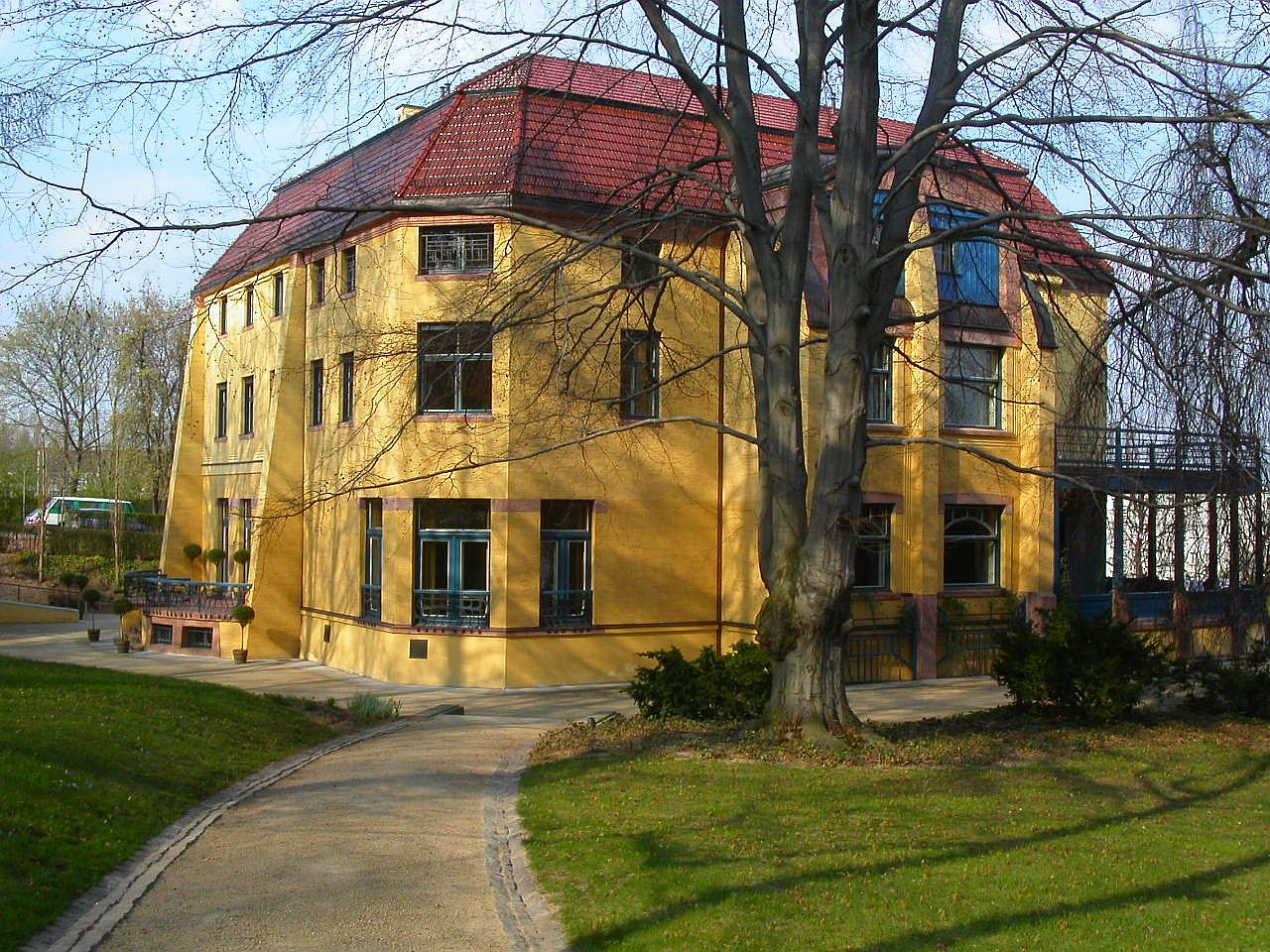
Villa Esche, Chemnitz, Germany

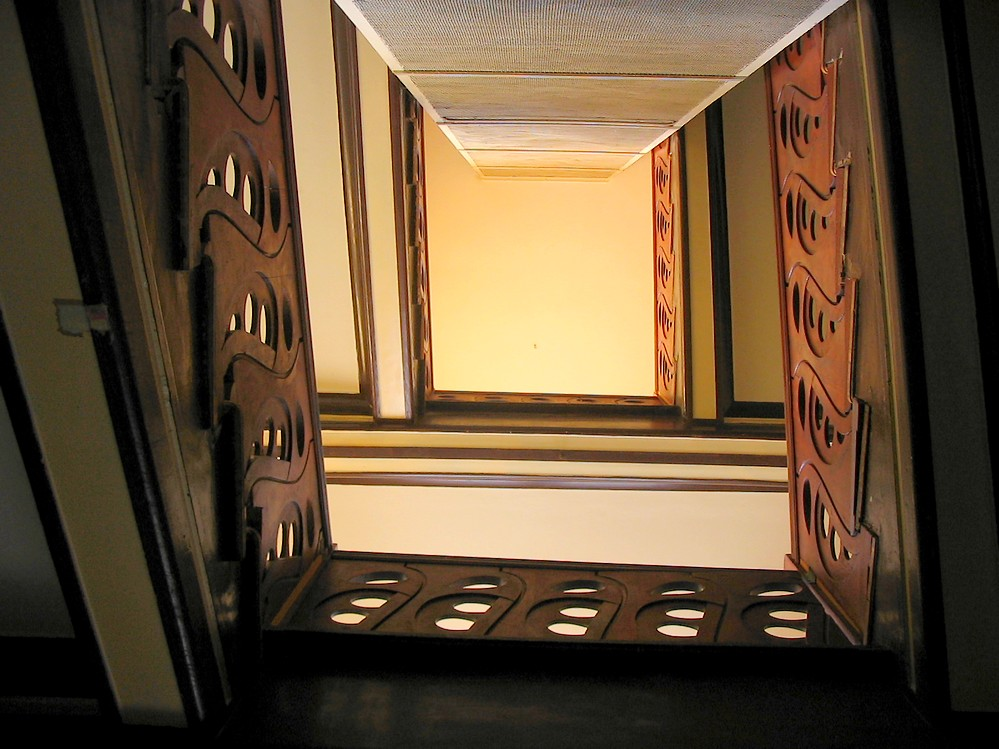
Staircase of the Sanatorium of Trzebiechów, Poland

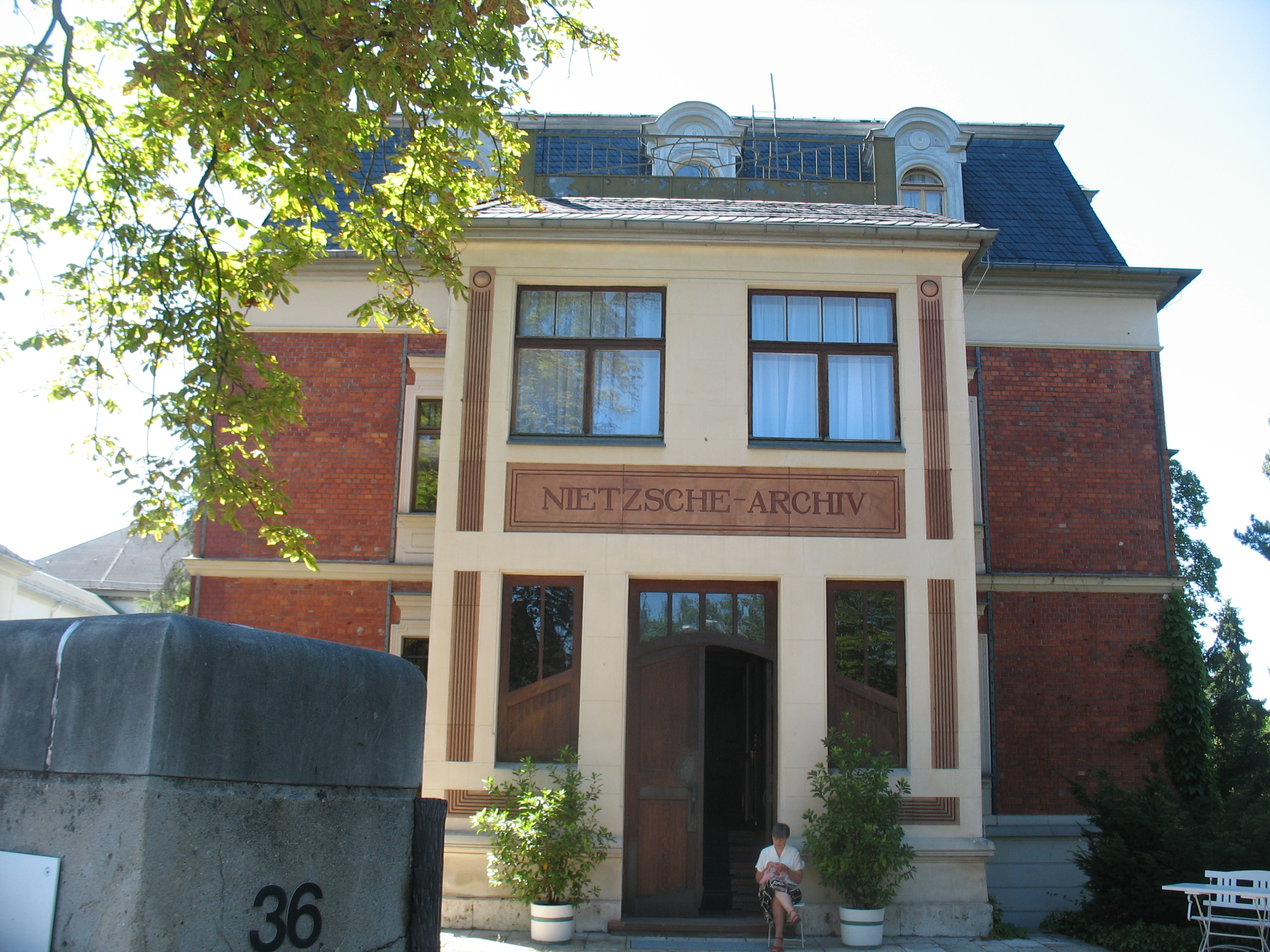
Extension to the Nietzsche Archive, Weimar, Germany

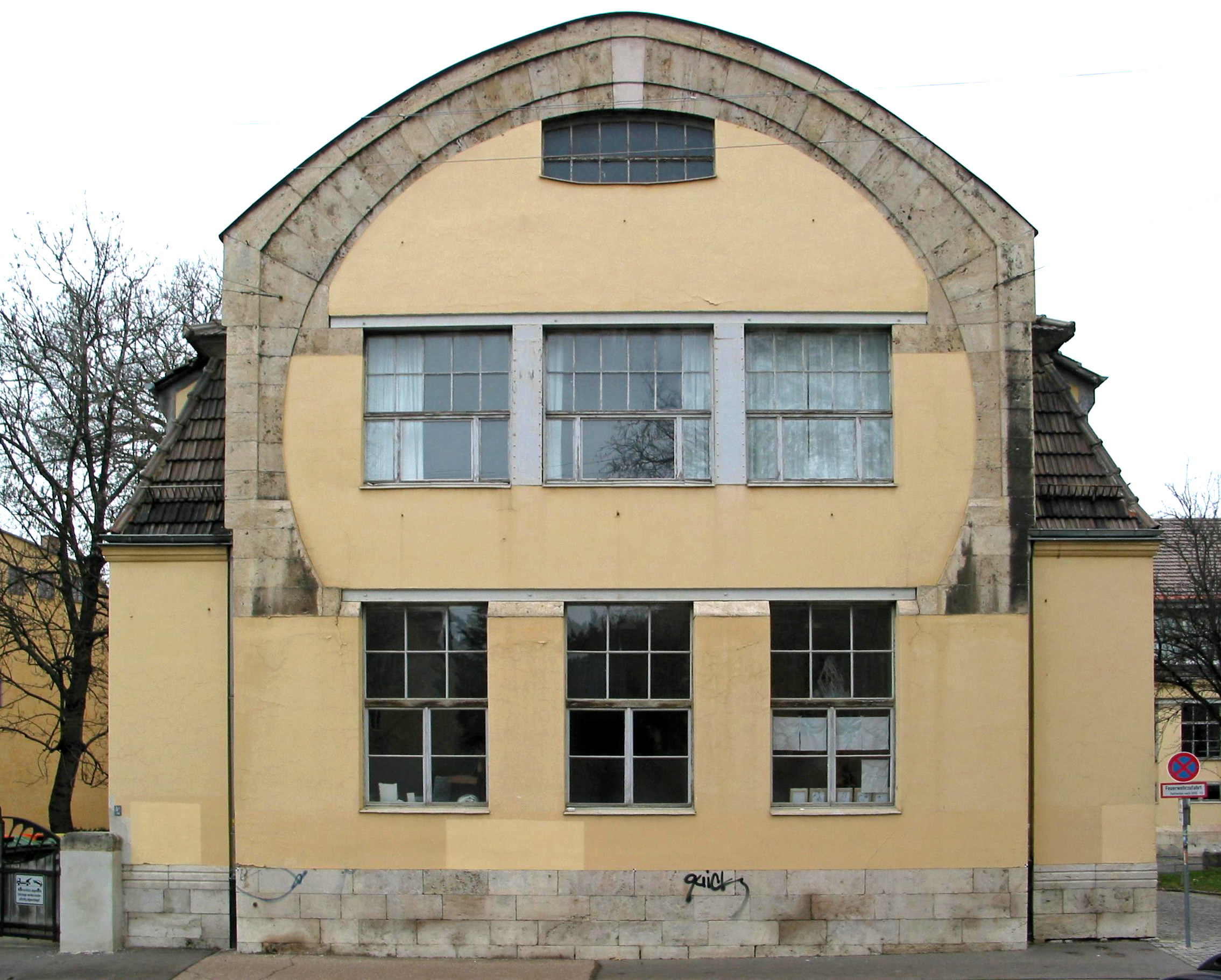
Van-de-Velde-Building, Weimar, Germany, home of the art faculty of the Bauhaus-University

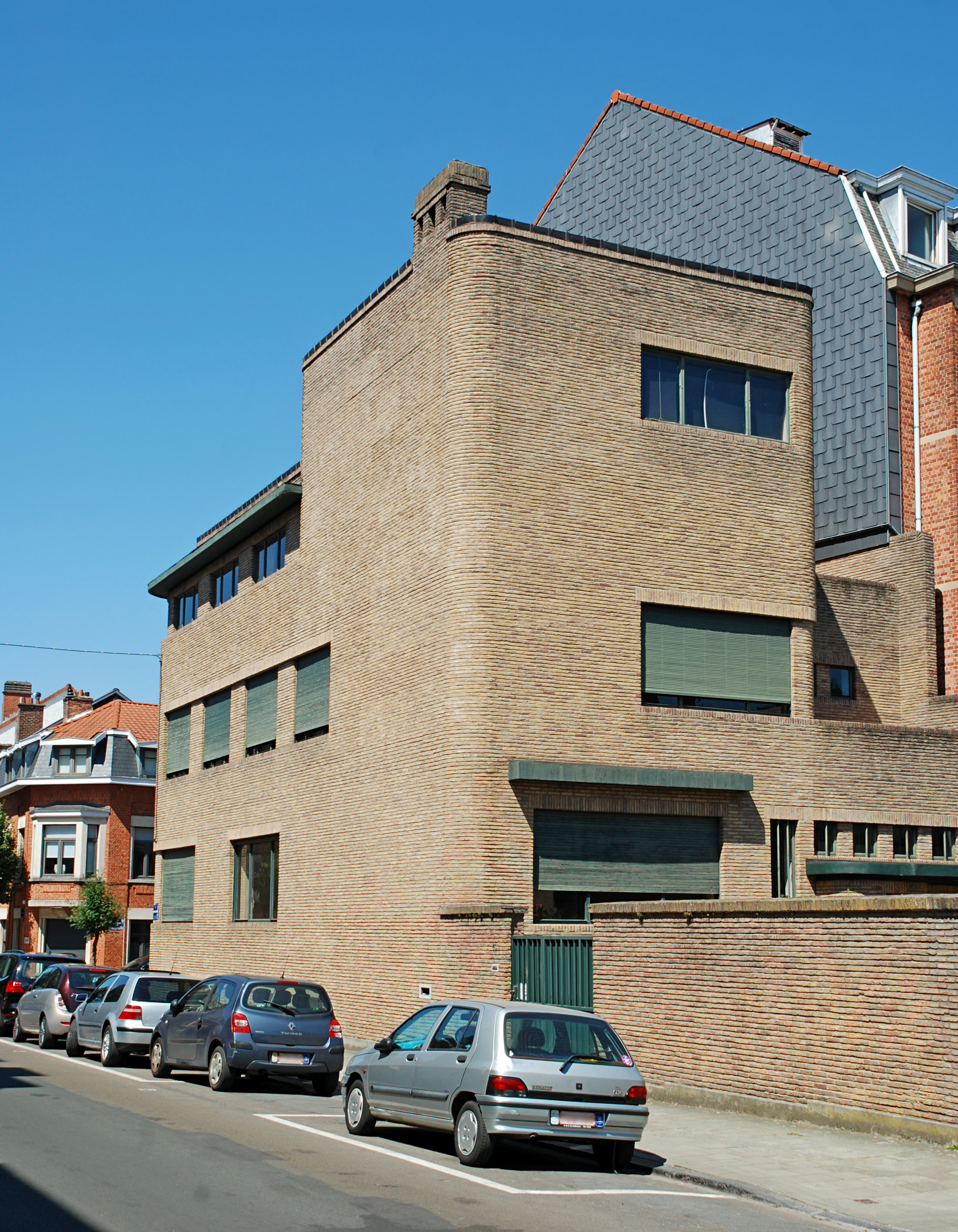
Wolfers House, Ixelles (Brussels), Belgium

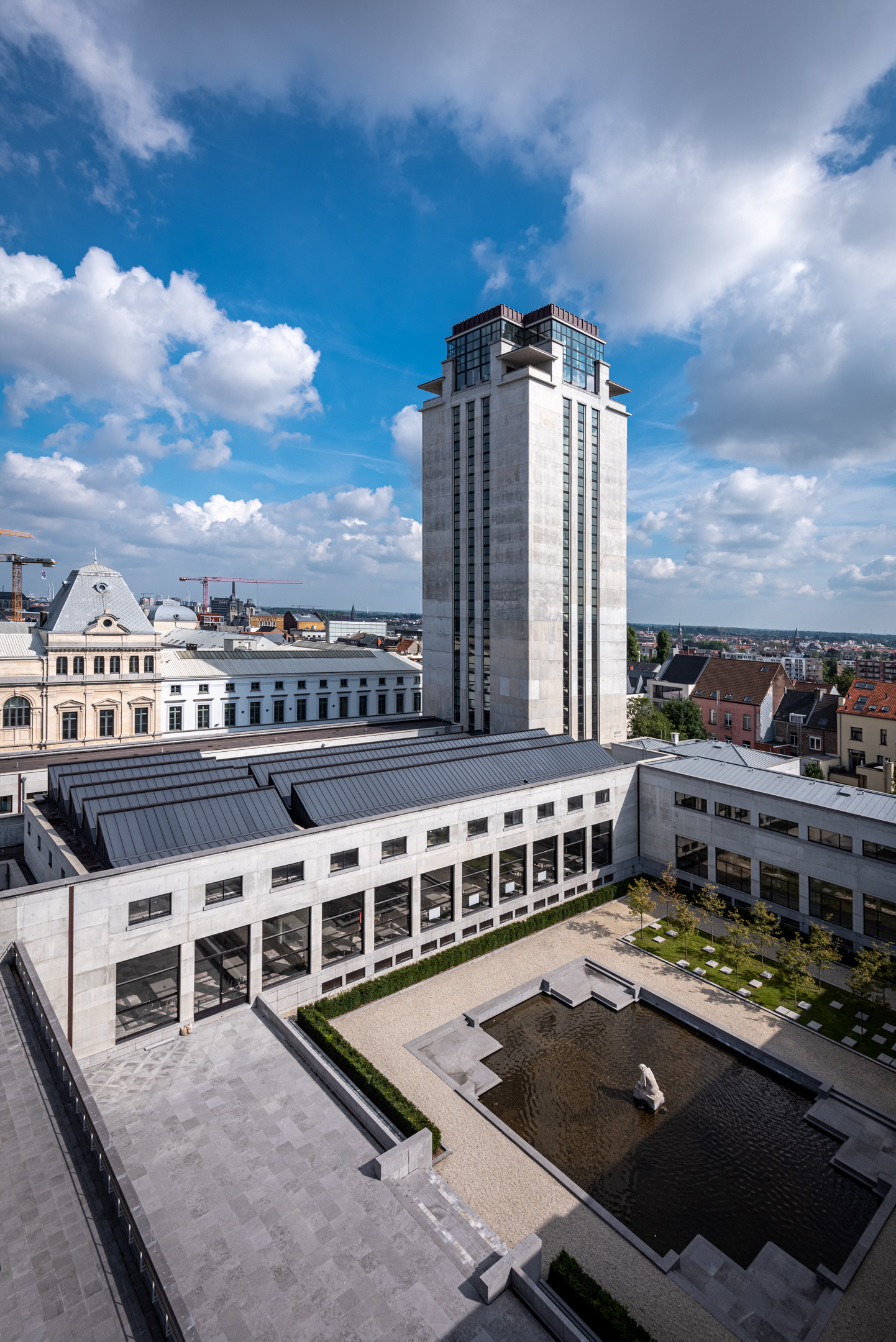
Boekentoren of Ghent University, Ghent, Belgium

== Bibliography ==
- Berko, P; Berko, V (1981), Dictionary of Belgian painters born between 1750 & 1875, Knokke, pp. 684–85.
- Hollis, Richard, Henry van de Velde. The Artist as Designer. From Art Nouveau to Modenism. Occasional Papers, 2019.
- Jacobs, Steven (2005), Wonen als kunstwerk, een woonplaats voor de kunst, Van Halewyck.
- Kuenzli, Katherine Marie. 2019. Henry van de Velde : Designing Modernism. New Haven: Yale University Press.
- Marechal, Dominique (2010), Frank Brangwyn et la galerie L'Art nouveau, in : Siegfried Bing & la Belgique / België. Bulletin 1 – 2010, [colloquium Siegfried Bing et la Belgique, 11–12.V.2006], Brussels Royal Museums of Fine Arts of Belgium, pp. 176–193 [English influence on H.van de Velde, Dahlia Wallpaper].
- Ploegaerts, Léon et Pierre Puttemans, L'œuvre architecturale de Henry van de Velde, Laval, 1987.
- Sembach, Klaus-Jürgen, Henry van de Velde: ein europäischer Künstler seiner Zeit, Köln: Wienand Verlag, 1992, ISBN 3-87909-314-8
- Tucker, Elizabeth and Katherine M Kuenzli (2022), Henry van de Velde :Selected Essays, 1889–1914. Edited by Katherine M. Kuenzli. Translated by Elizabeth Tucker. Los Angeles, Getty Research Institute.
