= Villa Bloemenwerf =

Historic Art Nouveau house in Brussels, Belgium

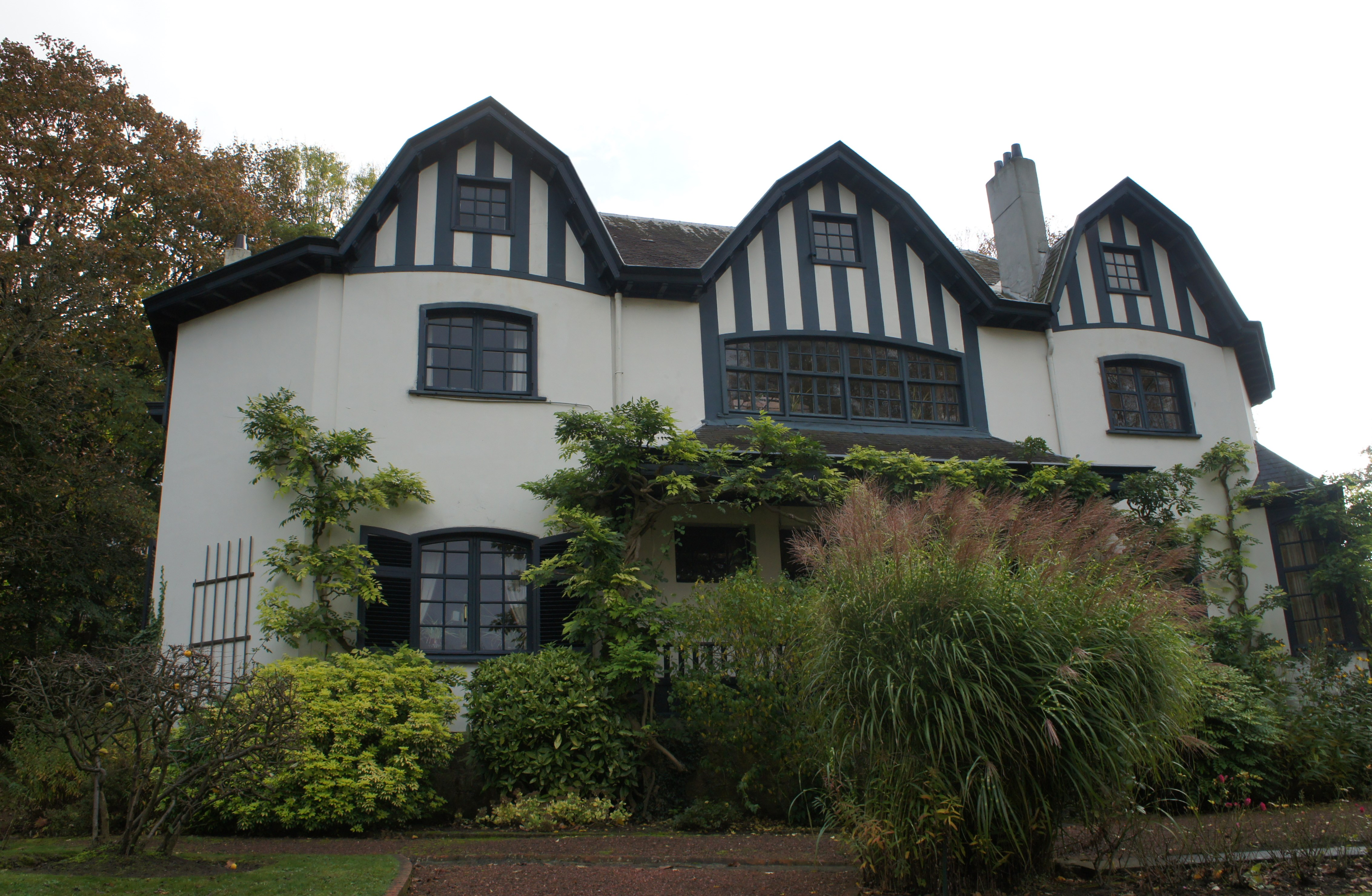
- Exterior of the Villa Bloemenwerf
- Interactive map of the Villa Bloemenwerf area

General information
- Architectural style: Arts and Crafts
- Location: Avenue Vanderaey / Vanderaeylaan 102, 1180 Uccle, Brussels-Capital Region, Belgium
- Coordinates: 50°47′44.9″N 4°20′36.3″E
- Construction started: 1895
- Completed: 1896
- Client: Henry van de Velde

Design and construction
- Architect: Henry van de Velde

The Villa Bloemenwerf (Dutch: [ˈblumə(ɱ)ʋɛr(ə)f]) is the former residence of the Belgian painter, architect and interior designer Henry van de Velde, built in 1895. It is located at 102, avenue Vanderaey/Vanderaeylaan in the Uccle municipality of Brussels, Belgium. Van de Velde designed the house and its interior, as well as the furnishings, partially drawing inspiration from William Morris' Red House in Bexleyheath, London. Maria Sèthe, his wife, designed the garden surrounding the house.

== History ==
The Villa Bloemenwerf, built in 1895, was Henry van de Velde's first creation as an architect. The exterior of the house was inspired by the Red House in Bexleyheath, south-east London, the residence of the British writer and artist William Morris, the founder of the Arts and Crafts movement. Trained as a painter, Van de Velde turned to illustration, then to furniture design, and finally to architecture. For the Villa Bloemenwerf, he created the textiles, wallpaper, silverware, jewellery, and even clothing, that matched the style of the residence.

The Villa Bloemenwerf was Van de Velde's private residence (with his wife Maria Sèthe and their child) and served as a workshop for him and his collaborators, as well as a centre for meetings with the European intellectual and artistic elite of the time. Van de Velde left the Bloemenwerf and Brussels for Weimar, Germany, in 1900.

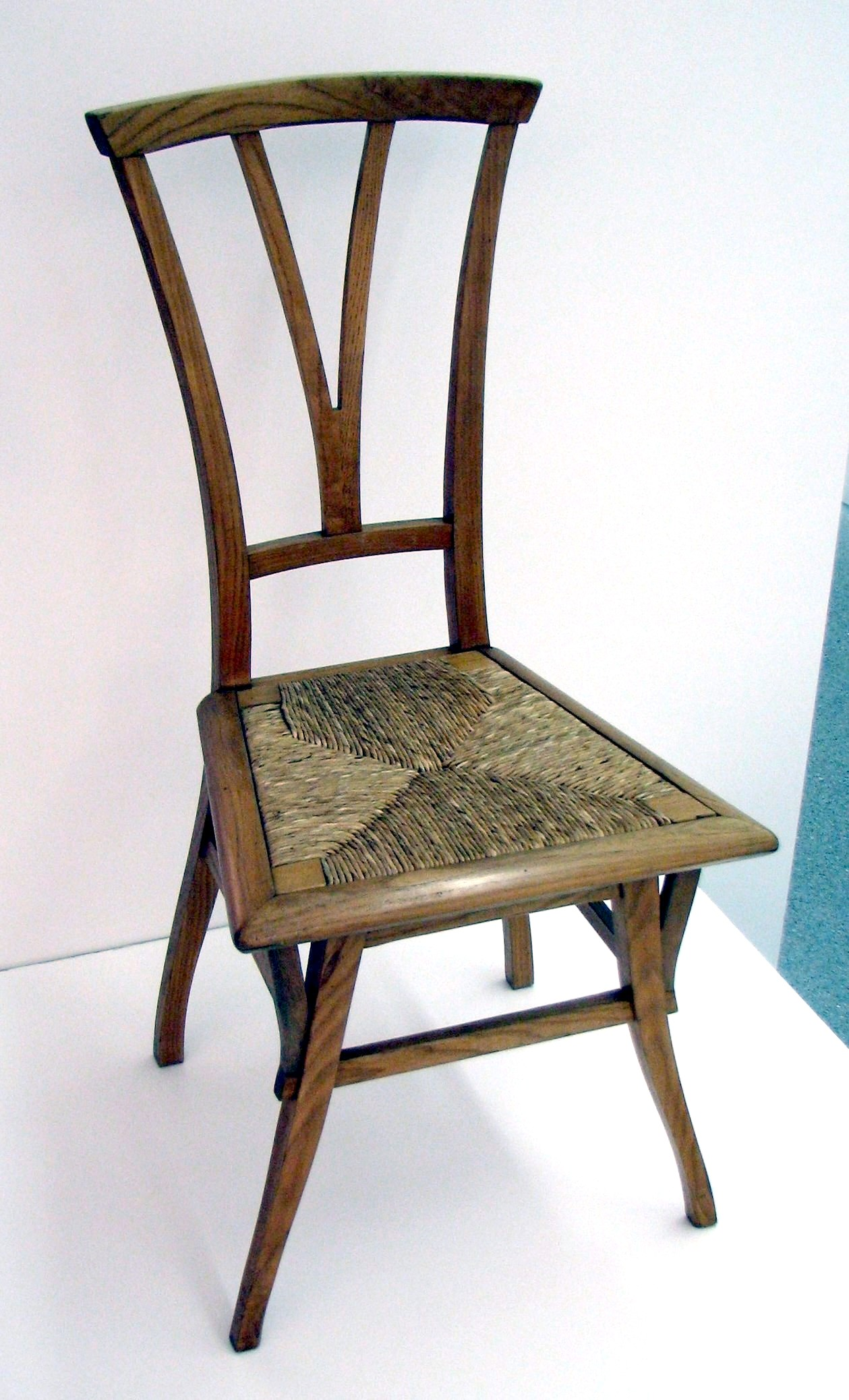
Chair by Van de Velde for the Villa Bloemenwerf (1895)

== See also ==
- Art Nouveau in Brussels
- History of Brussels
- Culture of Belgium
- Belgium in the long nineteenth century
