= Chlebów, Lubusz Voivodeship =

Chlebów
- Village
- Location within Poland
- Coordinates: 52°8′N 14°52′E
- Country: Poland
- Voivodeship: Lubusz
- County: Krosno
- Gmina: Maszewo

Chlebów ([ˈxlɛbuf]; German: Klebow) is a village in the administrative district of Gmina Maszewo, within Krosno County, Lubusz Voivodeship, in western Poland.
