= Gęstowice =

- Village
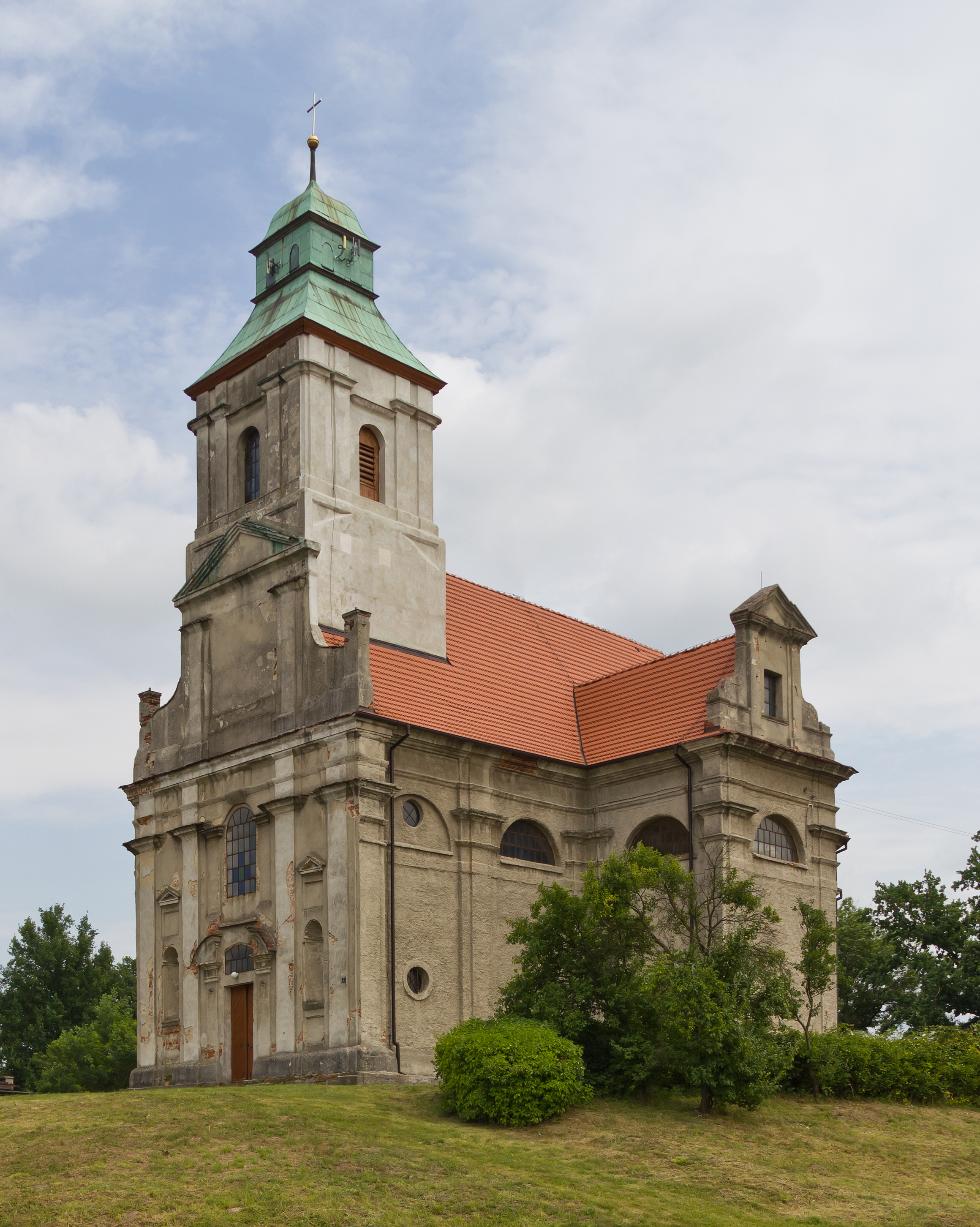

- Location within Poland
- Coordinates: 52°9′N 14°54′E
- Country: Poland
- Voivodeship: Lubusz
- County: Krosno
- Gmina: Maszewo

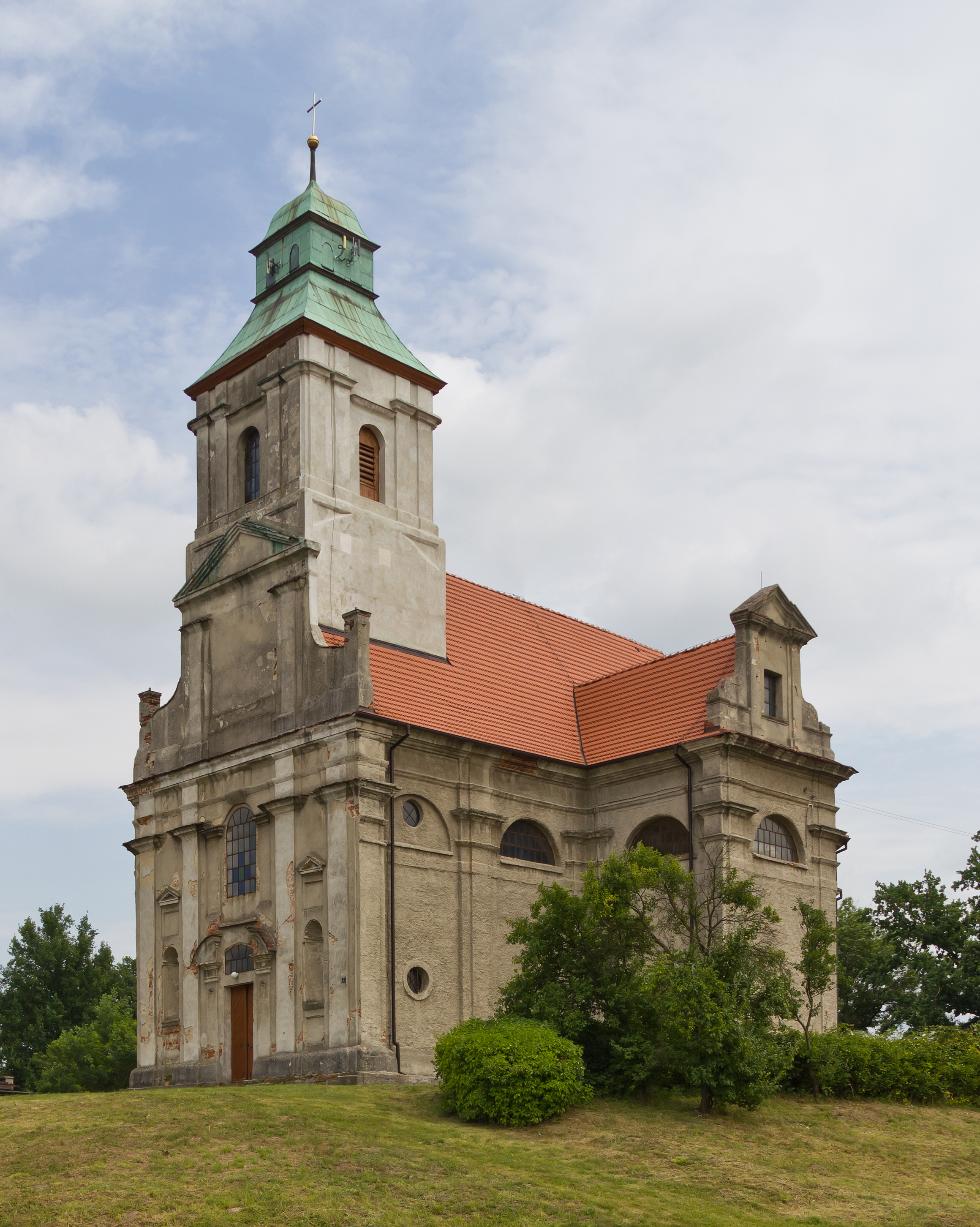
Church

Gęstowice ([ɡɛ̃stɔˈvit͡sɛ]; German: Tammendorf) is a village in the administrative district of Gmina Maszewo, within Krosno County, Lubusz Voivodeship, in western Poland.
