= Połęcko, Gmina Maszewo =

Połęcko
- Village
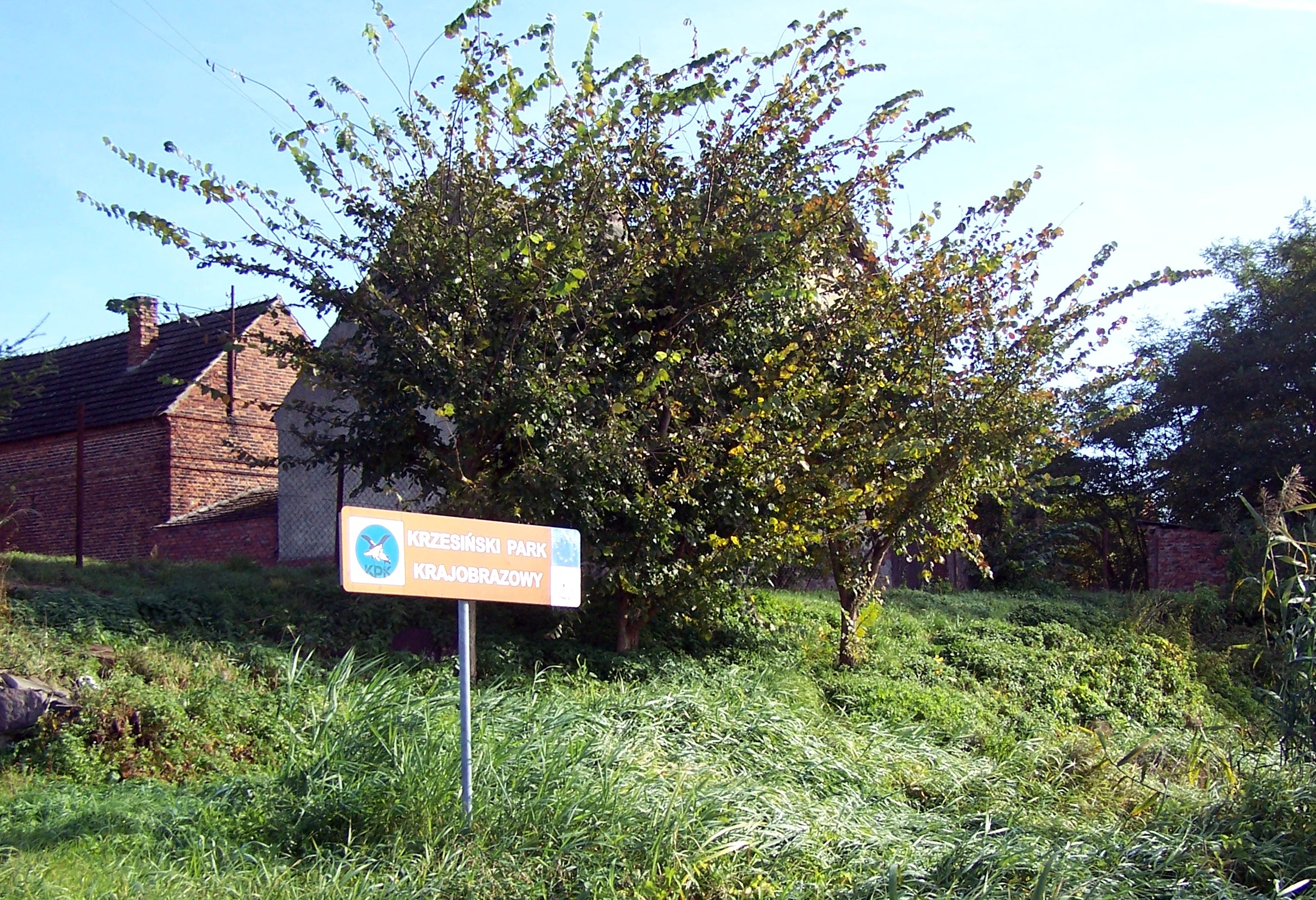

- Location within Poland
- Coordinates: 52°3′15″N 14°53′42″E
- Country: Poland
- Voivodeship: Lubusz
- County: Krosno
- Gmina: Maszewo

Połęcko ([pɔˈwɛnt͡skɔ]; German: Pollenzig) is a village in the administrative district of Gmina Maszewo, within Krosno County, Lubusz Voivodeship, in western Poland.
