= Radomicko, Lubusz Voivodeship =

Radomicko
- Village
- Location within Poland
- Coordinates: 52°7′N 14°58′E
- Country: Poland
- Voivodeship: Lubusz
- County: Krosno
- Gmina: Maszewo

Radomicko [radɔˈmit͡skɔ] is a village in the administrative district of Gmina Maszewo, within Krosno County, Lubusz Voivodeship, in western Poland.
