= Willi Reschke =

German World War II fighter pilot

- Reschke as an Oberfeldwebel
- Born: 3 February 1922; Mühlow, Prussia, Weimar Republic
- Died: 5 July 2017 (aged 95); Thuringia
- Military career
- Allegiance: Nazi Germany
- Branch: Luftwaffe
- Service years: 1941–1945
- Rank: Oberfeldwebel (sergeant)
- Units: JG 302; JG 301
- Conflicts: See battles World War II: Defense of the Reich
- Awards: Knight's Cross of the Iron Cross

Willi Reschke (3 February 1922 – 5 July 2017) was a Luftwaffe ace and recipient of the Knight's Cross of the Iron Cross during World War II, credited with 27 aerial victories in 70 missions. In 1999, Reschke recounted his wartime experiences in print, published in English in 2005 as "Jagdgeschwader 301/302 'Wilde Sau': In Defense Of The Reich with the Bf 109, Fw 190 and Ta 152;" including writing about the late-war period he spent flying the exotic Focke-Wulf Ta 152 high-altitude fighter-interceptor designed by Kurt Tank.

== Early life and career ==
Reschke was born on 3 February 1922 at Mühlow, Province of Brandenburg, present-day Miłów in western Poland. Mühlow is located approximately 15 kilometres (9.3 miles) northeast of Guben where the Luftwaffe operated an A/B flight school. (Note: Flight training in the Luftwaffe progressed through the levels A1, A2 and B1, B2, referred to as A/B flight training. A training included theoretical and practical training in aerobatics, navigation, long-distance flights and dead-stick landings. The B courses included high-altitude flights, instrument flights, night landings and training to handle the aircraft in difficult situations.) According to his own account, there Reschke developed his interest to become an aviator. In February 1940, he volunteered for military service in the Luftwaffe. His medical checkup was conducted at Paunsdorf, a borough of Leipzig, and was accepted. One year later, on 4 February 1941, he joined the Fliegerausbildungs-Bataillon at Königsberg in der Neumark where he received his basic training.

Reschke commenced pilot-training in spring 1942. On 6 April 1943, flight training continued at Neiße, present-day Nysa, Poland. There he learned to fly the Klemm Kl 25, Arado Ar 66, Focke-Wulf Fw 56 and Arado Ar 96 with a focus on formation flying, cross-country flying and aerobatics. Additionally, he also took classroom courses in navigation. Reschke completed flight training on 27 June 1943 and he was presented with the Aviator badge (Flugzeugführerabzeichen). On 23 October 1943, Reschke served with Jagdgeschwader 102 (JG 102—102nd Fighter Wing), formerly Jagdfliegerschule 2 (2nd fighter pilot school), in Zerbst to undergo operational training. On 13 June 1944, Reschke continued his training at the Ergänzungs-Jagdgruppe West, a supplementary training unit for fighter pilots destined to fight on the Western Front which was based in Gabbert, present-day Jaworze in northwestern Poland. Over the next three days, he made 21 combat simulation flights. On 18 June, he was sent to a front-line fighter unit by train.

== World War II ==
World War II in Europe had begun on Friday 1 September 1939 when German forces invaded Poland. On 20 June 1944, Unteroffizier Reschke arrived by train in Vienna. Following a brief stay, he was sent to the airfield at Götzendorf an der Leitha where the I. Gruppe (1st group) of Jagdgeschwader 302 (JG 302—302nd Fighter Wing) under the command of Hauptmann Richard Lewens was based. There, Reschke was assigned to 1. Staffel (1st squadron) of JG 302. Staffelkapitän (squadron leader) of 1. Staffel was Hauptmann Heinrich Wurzer. At the time, the Gruppe was equipped with the Messerschmitt Bf 109 G-6. Reschke flew his first combat mission on 26 June and was almost shot down by escorting fighters, landing his damaged fighter at Deutsch-Wagram. That day, the United States Army Air Forces (USAAF) Fifteenth Air Force targeted the hydrogenation factory at Moosbierbaum as part of the oil campaign. Flying from airfields in Italy, the USAAF dispatched 157 Boeing B-17 Flying Fortress and 502 Consolidated B-24 Liberator bombers, escorted by 321 fighter aircraft.

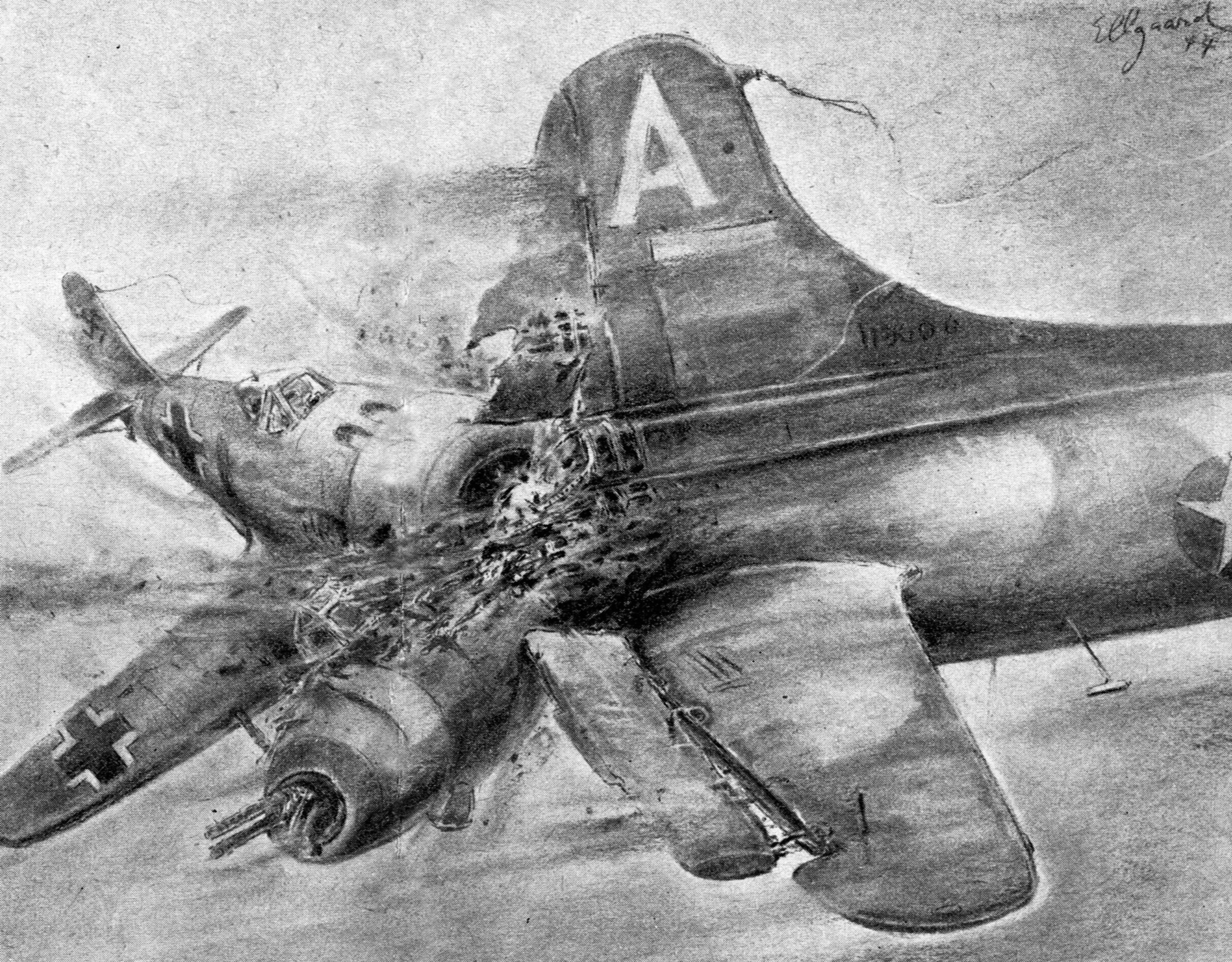
A 1944 drawing by Helmuth Ellgaard illustrating "ramming"

On 2 July, the Fifteenth Air Force attacked Budapest. In defense of this attack, I. Gruppe of JG 302 was scrambled at 09:27. At 10:25 and 10:29, Reschke claimed his first two aerial victories when he shot down two USAAF B-24 bombers shot down southwest of Budapest. During this combat, his Bf 109 G-6 was hit in the radiator resulting in a forced landing in a field near Érd. Reschke claimed an unconfirmed aerial victory over a North American P-51 Mustang fighter on 6 July during an USAAF attack on Munich. The next day, Reschke downed a B-24, his third confirmed claim, this time by ramming when his guns malfunctioned. Following the collision, he successfully bailed out of his damaged fighter. On 24 August Reschke claimed a B-24 near Jindřichův Hradec but during an attack on a second his aircraft was hit by return fire and he attempted to force-land while under attack by P-51 fighters, having to use his parachute. On 29 August he shot down a B-17 bomber south of Zlín, although another Bf 109 fired on his Bf 109 G-6 and Reschke had to force-land damaged. By the end of August 1944 Reschke had claimed 13 aerial victories, seven bombers in July and six in August.

=== Defense of the Reich ===
I. Gruppe of JG 302 was redesignated to III. Gruppe of Jagdgeschwader 301 (JG 301—301st Fighter Wing) in August 1944. The unit was re-equipped with the Focke-Wulf Fw 190 A-8 by end of September 1944 and fought in Defense of the Reich. Reschke claimed his first aerial victory flying the Fw 190 on 21 November, a B-17 shot down south of Magdeburg. In October, the unit transferred to Stendal near Berlin. On 24 December 1944, the USAAF’s Eighth Air Force launched its largest aerial attack of the war, dispatching over 2,000 bombers against Luftwaffe airfields and infrastructure. In total, the Luftwaffe shot down just twelve of the attacking bombers, including two by Reschke. According to Weal, Reschke was credited with two B-24 bombers shot down over Hanover. In the account presented by Mathews and Foreman, Reschke had claimed two B-17 bombers that day south of Hanover. On 1 January 1945, Feldwebel Reschke downed a B-17 for his 22nd victory claim but again, hit by return fire, he bailed out of his Fw 190 near Gardelegen.

=== Flying the Ta 152 ===
III. Gruppe of JG 301 was equipped with the Focke-Wulf Ta 152 H-0 on 27 January 1945, receiving eleven aircraft at the Neuhausen Airfield near Cottbus. Following a short briefing, the pilots transferred the eleven aircraft to an airfield at Alteno. There, the pilots familiarized themselves with this new aircraft. On 16 February, III. Gruppe moved to an airfield at Sachau. Reschke first flew the Ta 152 operationally on 2 March. That day, the USAAF targeted the oil refineries at Böhlen and Leuna. In total twelve Ta 152s scrambled and met up in the area of Burg. The Gruppe failed to make contact with the bombers as they came under attack by Luftwaffe Bf 109 fighters whose pilots failed to identify the Ta 152 as a German aircraft.

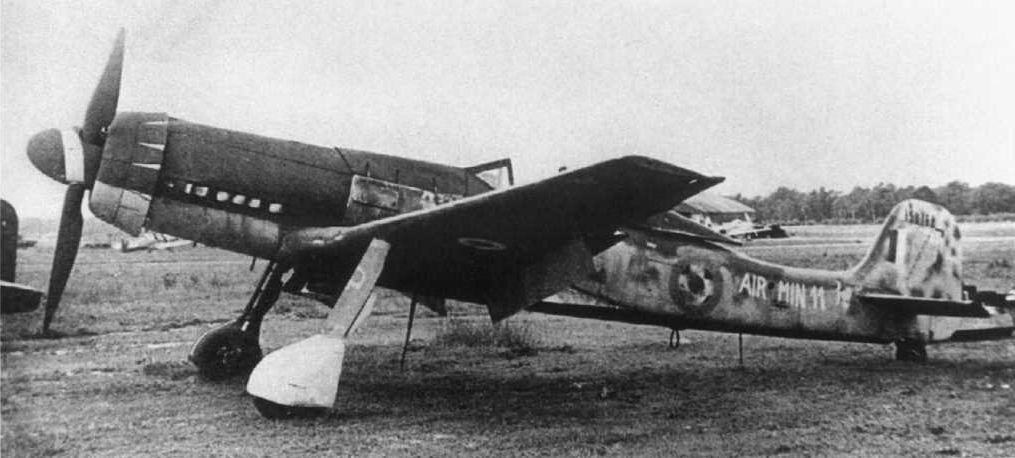
British-captured Ta 152 H-1, Werknummer 150 168, flown by Reschke on 24 April 1945.

The allotted strength of III. Gruppe was 35 Ta 152s. This figure was never reached and in consequence the pilots and their remaining Ta 152s were all transferred to the Geschwaderstab (headquarters unit) of JG 301. Reschke joined the Geschwaderstab on 13 March, which was then based at Stendal. Reschke had left Sachau in his Ta 152 H "black 3" (Werknummer 150 007—factory number) at 16:10, landing in Stendal at 16:25. That day, he was also awarded the German Cross in Gold (Deutsches Kreuz in Gold). The presentation of the German Cross was made by the Geschwaderkommodore of JG 301, Oberstleutnant Fritz Auffhammer. The next day, Generalmajor Dietrich Peltz visited the unit. Peltz had been tasked with the coordination of the aerial defenses of the Reich. At Stendal, Peltz tested one of the Ta 152 H fighters, which happened to be the Ta 152 H assigned to Reschke. In the second half of March, the Geschwaderstab predominantly flew fighter protection for II. Gruppe of JG 301 during the takeoff and landing phase. II. Gruppe at the time was equipped with the Fw 190 D-9.

The Geschwaderstab moved to an airfield at Neustadt-Glewe on 10 April. On 14 April, Reschke and two other pilots were scrambled when Hawker Tempest fighters were reported attacking the railway yards at Ludwigslust. In defense of this attack, he claimed a Tempest of No. 486(NZ) Squadron shot down, its pilot Warrant Officer O.J. Mitchell was killed in action. On 20 April, Oberfeldwebel Reschke received the Knight's Cross of the Iron Cross (Ritterkreuz des Eisernen Kreuzes). That day, fellow JG 301 pilot Oberfeldwebel Walter Loos was also awarded the Knight's Cross. Reschke claimed his last two victories of the war on 24 April when he downed two Soviet Yakovlev Yak-9 fighters near Berlin. According to his own account, the Yak-9 was hopelessly inferior to the Ta 152. The final destination of the Geschwaderstab was Leck Airfield. There, all remaining Ta 152s were handed over to British forces, including Reschke's last aircraft, Ta 152 H-1 "green 9" (Werknummer 150 168). This aircraft was tested by Eric Brown and scrapped in 1946.

== Later life ==
Reschke died on 5 July 2017 at the age of 95 in Thuringia.

== Summary of career ==
=== Aerial victory claims ===
According to Obermaier, Reschke flew about 70 missions during his combat career in which he claimed 27 aerial victories. He claimed two victories in the Eastern Front and 25 over the Western Front, including 20 four-engine bombers. Three claims were made flying the Ta 152. He was shot down eight times, bailing out five times, and was wounded once. Mathews and Foreman, authors of Luftwaffe Aces — Biographies and Victory Claims, researched the German Federal Archives and found records for 20 aerial victory claims, plus seven further unconfirmed claims. This figure of confirmed claims includes two aerial victories on the Eastern Front and eighteen on the Western Front, including fourteen four-engine bombers.

Chronicle of aerial victories
This and the – (dash) indicates unconfirmed aerial victory claims for which Reschke did not receive credit. This along with the * (asterisk) indicates an Herausschuss (separation shot)—a severely damaged heavy bomber forced to separate from his combat box which was counted as an aerial victory. This along with the & (ampersand) indicates a endgültige Vernichtung (final destruction)—a coup de grâce inflicted on an already damaged heavy bomber. This and the ? (question mark) indicates information discrepancies listed by Prien, Stemmer, Bock, Balke, Mathews, Foreman and Weal.
Claim	Date	Time	Type	Location	Claim	Date	Time	Type	Location
– 1. Staffel of Jagdgeschwader 302 – Eastern Front — July – August 1944
1	2 July 1944	10:25	B-24	PQ 14 Ost N/GS-5 southwest of Budapest	8	19 July 1944	09:40	B-17	Lake Starnberg
2	2 July 1944	10:29	B-24	PQ 14 Ost N/GS-7/8 southwest of Budapest	9	16 August 1944	10:00	B-17	PQ 05 Ost S/MU-3, southeast of Kassel
3	7 July 1944	11:55	B-24	PQ 14 Ost N/CQ northeast of Bratislava	10? (Note: According to Mathews Foreman, this claim was unconfirmed.)	20 August 1944	09:45	B-17	south of Budapest
4?	13 July 1944	10:45	B-17	Lake Neusiedl	11?	20 August 1944	09:52	B-17*	south of Budapest
5?	14 July 1944	09:55	B-24	Budapest	— (Note: According to Mathews Foreman, this claim was confirmed and is listed as his sixth aerial victory.)	22 August 1944	12:50	B-17&	PQ 14 Ost N/GP, Pápa north of Lake Balaton
6?	18 July 1944	10:53	B-24	Munich	12	24 August 1944	12:40	B-24	PQ 14 Ost N/UL-3/6; Neuhaus
7?	18 July 1944	11:10	P-51	Munich	13	29 August 1944	10:50	B-17*	PQ 05 Ost S/UQ, Brod
– 9. Staffel of Jagdgeschwader 301 – Defense of the Reich — November 1944 – January 1945
14?	21 November 1944	12:05	B-17	south of Magdeburg	19	24 December 1944	15:03	B-17? (Note: According to Weal claimed as a Consolidated B-24 Liberator.)	south of Hanover
15	26 November 1944	12:45	B-24	PQ 15 Ost S/GU/HU vicinity of Hildesheim	20	31 December 1944	11:35	B-24	northeast of Rotenburg an der Wümme vicinity of Hamburg
16	17 December 1944	11:20	B-24	south of Göttingen	21	1 January 1945	12:00	B-17	vicinity of Gardelegen
17	17 December 1944	11:25	P-51	south of Göttingen	22	14 January 1945	12:45	P-51	vicinity of Mecklenburg
18	24 December 1944	14:55	B-17?	south of Hanover	23	14 January 1945	12:55	P-47	vicinity of Kyritz
– Stab of Jagdgeschwader 301 – Defense of the Reich — April 1945
24	14 April 1945	19:20	Tempest	vicinity of Ludwigslust	26	24 April 1945	08:48	Yak-9	vicinity of Berlin
25	24 April 1945	08:45	Yak-9	vicinity of Berlin					

=== Awards ===
- Aviator badge (27 June 1943)
- Iron Cross (1939) 2nd and 1st Class
- German Cross in Gold on 13 March 1945 as Oberfeldwebel in the 1./Jagdgeschwader 301
- Knight's Cross of the Iron Cross on 20 April 1945 as Oberfeldwebel and pilot in the Stab/Jagdgeschwader 301
