= Siedlisko, Gmina Maszewo =

Siedlisko
- Village
- Location within Poland
- Coordinates: 52°10′38″N 14°59′12″E
- Country: Poland
- Voivodeship: Lubusz
- County: Krosno
- Gmina: Maszewo

Siedlisko ([ɕɛˈdliskɔ]; German: Heidenau) is a village in the administrative district of Gmina Maszewo, within Krosno County, Lubusz Voivodeship, in western Poland.
