= Maszewo, Gmina Maszewo =

Maszewo
- Village
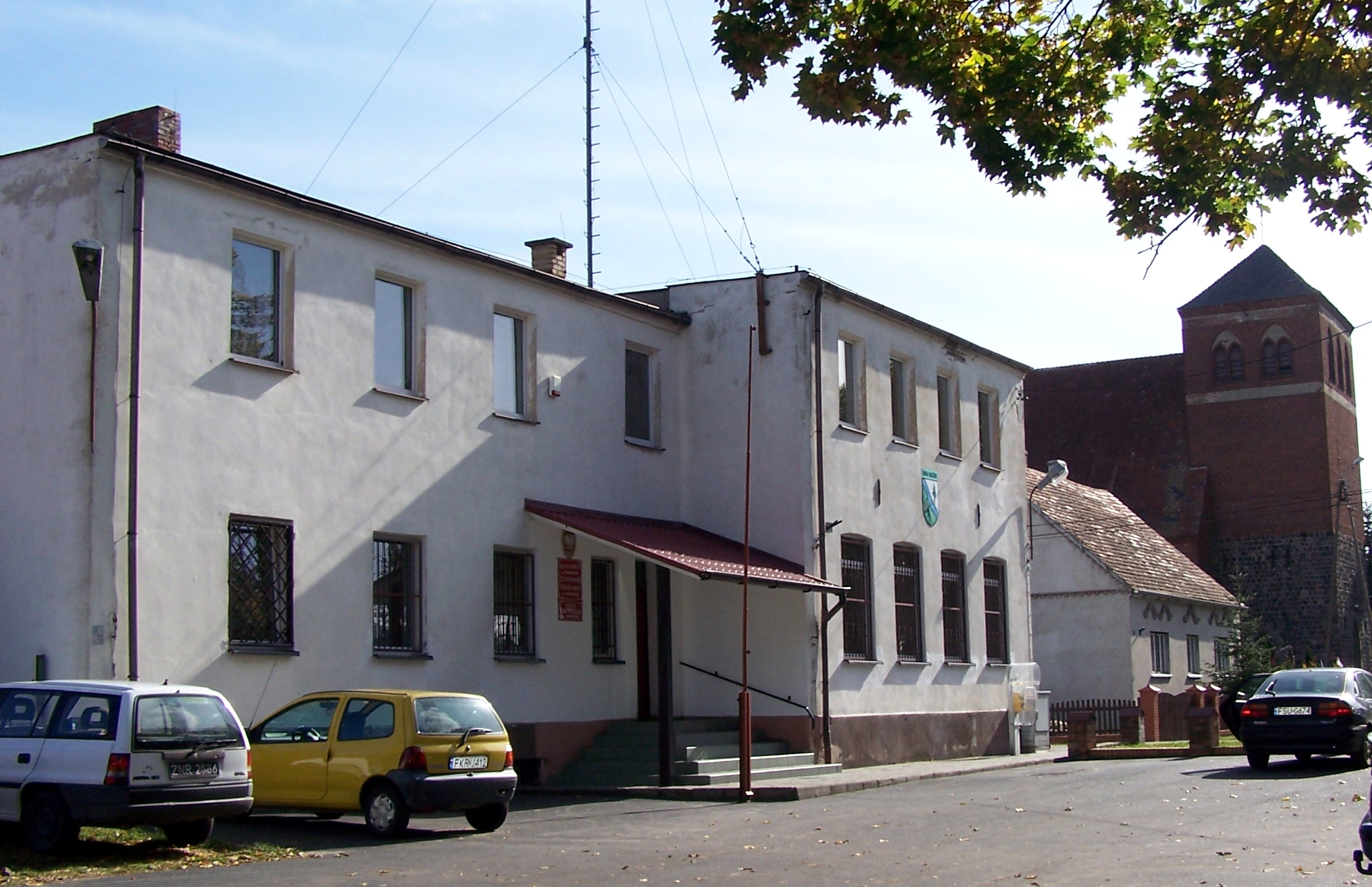
- Village hall building in the village

- Location within Poland
- Coordinates: 52°4′4″N 14°54′27″E
- Country: Poland
- Voivodeship: Lubusz
- County: Krosno
- Gmina: Maszewo
- Population: 460

Maszewo ([maˈʂɛvɔ]; German: Messow) is a village in Krosno County, Lubusz Voivodeship, in western Poland. It is the seat of the gmina (administrative district) called Gmina Maszewo.
