= Skarbona =

- Village
- Location within Poland
- Coordinates: 52°7′N 14°54′E
- Country: Poland
- Voivodeship: Lubusz
- County: Krosno
- Gmina: Maszewo

Skarbona ([skarˈbɔna]; German: Birkendorf) is a village in the administrative district of Gmina Maszewo, within Krosno County, Lubusz Voivodeship, in western Poland.
