= Bytomiec =

- Village
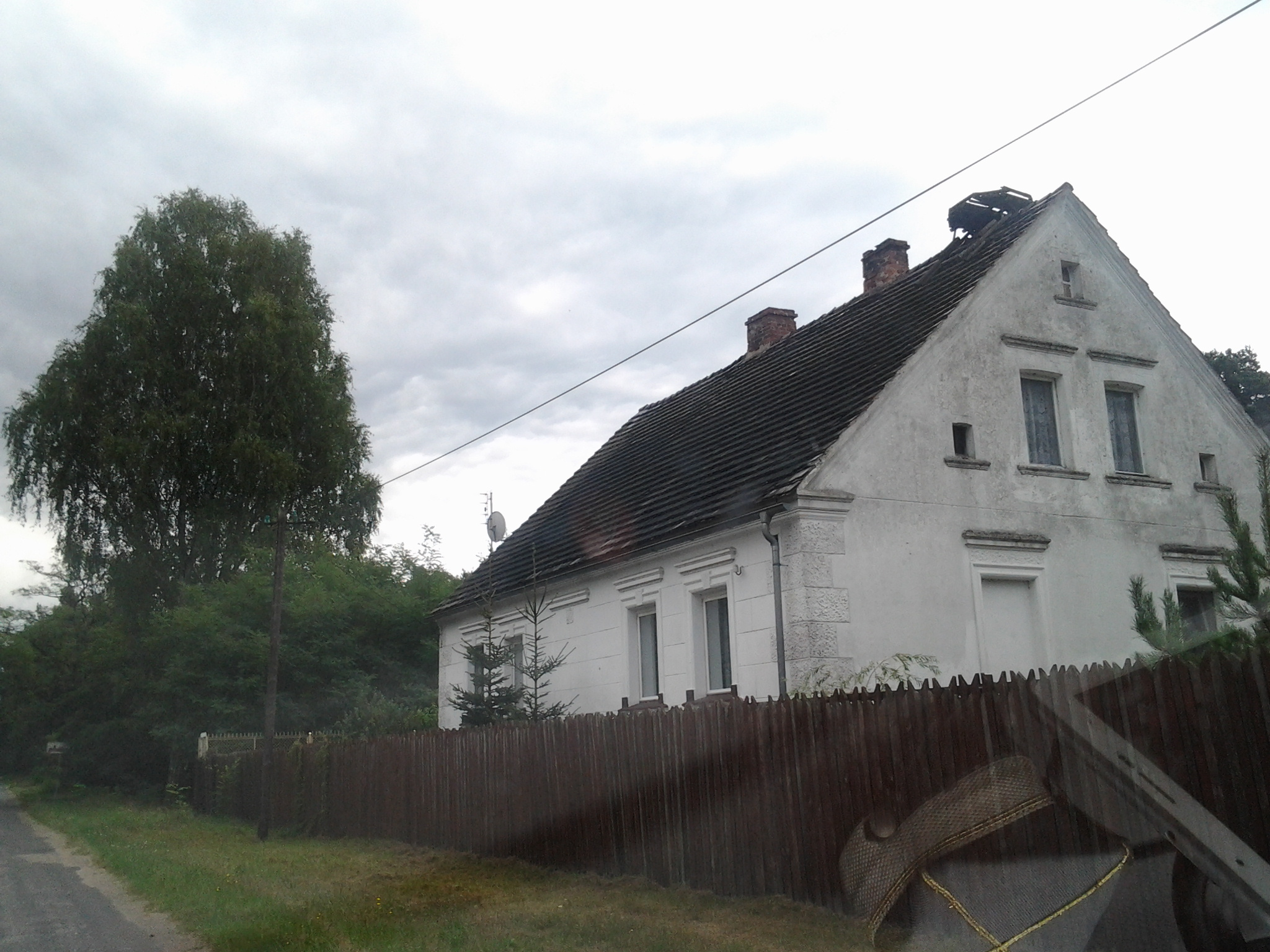

- Location within Poland
- Coordinates: 52°6′N 14°48′E
- Country: Poland
- Voivodeship: Lubusz
- County: Krosno
- Gmina: Maszewo

Bytomiec ([bɨˈtɔmjɛt͡s]; German: Siebenbeuthen) is a village in the administrative district of Gmina Maszewo, within Krosno County, Lubusz Voivodeship, in western Poland.
