= Walter Loos =

German World War II fighter pilot

- Born: 11 April 1923; Oppenheim, Germany
- Died: 27 October 2004 (aged 81); Landsberg am Lech, Germany
- Military career
- Allegiance: Nazi Germany; West Germany
- Branch: Luftwaffe; German Air Force
- Service years: 1939–1945; 1956–1976
- Rank: Hauptmann (Bundeswehr)
- Units: JG 3, JG 300, JG 301
- Conflicts: World War II
- Awards: Knight's Cross of the Iron Cross

Walter Loos (11 April 1923 – 27 October 2004) was a former Luftwaffe fighter ace and recipient of the Knight's Cross of the Iron Cross during World War II. During his career, he was credited with 38 aerial victories in 66 missions.

== World War II ==
In January 1944, Loos was posted to IV. Gruppe (4th group) of Jagdgeschwader 3 "Udet" (JG 3—3rd Fighter Wing). At the time, the Gruppe was commanded by Major Franz Beyer and was fighting in Defense of the Reich. On 26 February, IV. Gruppe moved to the airfield at Salzwedel where it remained until 7 June. That day, Major Friedrich-Karl Müller took command of the Gruppe after Beyer had been killed in action.

=== Defense of the Reich ===
In IV. Gruppe, Loos was assigned to Sturmstaffel 1, headed by Major Hans-Günter von Kornatzki. The Sturmstaffel was an experimental unit flying the so-called Sturmböcke (battering ram) up-gunned Focke-Wulf Fw 190 A-7 and A-8 aircraft. On 8 May, the Sturmstaffel became the 11. Staffel (11th squadron) and was then placed under the command of Oberleutnant Werner Gerth. Loos was credited with his first aerial victory on 6 March when the United States Strategic Air Forces (USAAF) Eighth Air Force sent 730 heavy bombers to Berlin. In the vicinity of Braunschweig, IV. Gruppe made a head-on attack and Loos was credited with an Herausschuss (separation shot)—a severely damaged heavy bomber forced to separate from its combat box which was counted as an aerial victory—over a Boeing B-17 Flying Fortress bomber.

On 22 April, 803 bombers of the USAAF Eighth Air Force targeted various German transportation targets in western Germany, in particular the railroad classification yard in Hamm. IV. Gruppe was scrambled at 18:20 in Salzwedel and engaged Consolidated B-24 Liberator bombers from the 2nd Air Division at 19:40 in a 20 minute aerial battle during which Loos shot down one of the B-24 bombers.

=== Flying the Ta 152 ===
Loos joined the Geschwaderstab (headquarters unit) of Jagdgeschwader 301 (JG 301—301st Fighter Wing) in April 1945. The Geschwaderstab of JG 301 had been equipped with the Focke-Wulf Ta 152 H in March and was commanded by Oberstleutnant Fritz Aufhammer. The Geschwaderstab moved to an airfield at Neustadt-Glewe on 10 April. On 20 April, Oberfeldwebel Loos received the Knight's Cross of the Iron Cross (Ritterkreuz des Eisernen Kreuzes). That day, fellow JG 301 pilot Oberfeldwebel Willi Reschke was also awarded the Knight's Cross. Loos claimed his first two aerial victories flying the Ta 152 on 24 April when he downed two Soviet Yakovlev Yak-9 fighters near Berlin. On 30 April, he claimed his last aerial victory when he again shot down a Yak-9 fighter.

== Summary of career ==
=== Aerial victory claims ===
According to Obermaier, Loos flew 66 missions during his combat career in which he claimed 38 aerial victories. He claimed seven victories in the Eastern Front and 31 over the Western Front, including 21 four-engine bombers. Nine claims were made flying the Ta 152 and he was shot down nine times. Spick states that Loos had a mission-to-claim ratio of 1.74. Forsyth lists him with 22 four-engined bombers shot down. Mathews and Foreman, authors of Luftwaffe Aces — Biographies and Victory Claims, researched the German Federal Archives and state that he was credited with more than 14 aerial victory claims, plus six further unconfirmed claims. This figure of confirmed claims includes at least three aerial victories on the Eastern Front and at least eleven on the Western Front, including at least ten four-engine bombers.

Victory claims were logged to a map-reference (PQ = Planquadrat), for example "PQ DF-DG". The Luftwaffe grid map (Jägermeldenetz) covered all of Europe, western Russia and North Africa and was composed of rectangles measuring 15 minutes of latitude by 30 minutes of longitude, an area of about 360 square miles (930 km^{2}). These sectors were then subdivided into 36 smaller units to give a location area 3 km × 4 km (1.9 mi × 2.5 mi) in size.

Chronicle of aerial victories
This and the – (dash) indicates unconfirmed aerial victory claims for which Loos did not receive credit. This along with the * (asterisk) indicates an Herausschuss (separation shot)—a severely damaged heavy bomber forced to separate from his combat box which was counted as an aerial victory. This and the ? (question mark) indicates information discrepancies listed by Mathews, Foreman and Weal.
Claim	Date	Time	Type	Location	Claim	Date	Time	Type	Location
– 11. Staffel of Jagdgeschwader 3 "Udet" – Defense of the Reich — January – May 1944
1? (Note: According to Mathews and Foreman, this claim was unconfirmed.)	6 March 1944	12:55? (Note: According to Mathews and Foreman claim at 12:52.)	B-17*	Gifhorn-Rathenow	6	11 April 1944	11:10	B-17*	south of Gardelegen
2?	8 March 1944	13:28	B-17*	Celle-Rathenow	7	11 April 1944	11:15	B-17	Magdeburg
3?	8 March 1944	13:31	B-17*	Celle-Rathenow	8	22 April 1944	19:46	B-24	Westerwald, southeast of Bonn
4?	8 April 1944	14:15	B-24*		9	29 April 1944	11:20	B-17	Berg
5?	9 April 1944	12:10	B-24*		10	8 May 1944	10:07	B-24*	south of Sülze-Südheide
– 4. Staffel of Jagdgeschwader 3 "Udet" – Defense of the Reich — May 1944
11	28 May 1944	14:20	B-17*	PQ 15 Ost S/GE-HE northeast of Magdeburg	13?	30 May 1944	11:15	B-24	
12	29 May 1944	12:25	B-24	PQ 15 Ost S/BJ-BK					
– Stab of Jagdgeschwader 300 – Defense of the Reich — June – September 1944
— (Note: This claim is not listed by Mathews and Foreman.)	7 July 1944	—	B-24*		17	23 August 1944	12:15	P-51	south of Mariazell-north of Kapfenberg/Mürzzuschlag
14	7 July 1944	09:45	B-24	north of Quedlinburg	?	28 August 1944	—	P-51	Vienna-Aspern
15?	9 August 1944	12:15	P-51			29 August 1944	10:46	B-17	Gottwaldov-Záhorovice/Púchov
16	15 August 1944	11:47	B-17	PQ 05 Ost S/PP-PO-QO; Büdesheim-Hasborn					
– Stab of Jagdgeschwader 301 – Defense of the Reich — April 1945
	24 April 1945	—	Yak-9	vicinity of Berlin		30 April 1945	—	Yak-9	vicinity of Berlin
	24 April 1945	—	Yak-9	vicinity of Berlin					

=== Awards ===
- Iron Cross (1939)
  - 2nd Class (9 March 1944)
  - 1st Class (9 May 1944)
- German Cross in Gold on 29 September 1944 as Feldwebel in Stab/Jagdgeschwader 300
- Knight's Cross of the Iron Cross on 20 April 1945 as Oberfeldwebel and pilot in the Stab/Jagdgeschwader 300
