= Miłów =

- Village
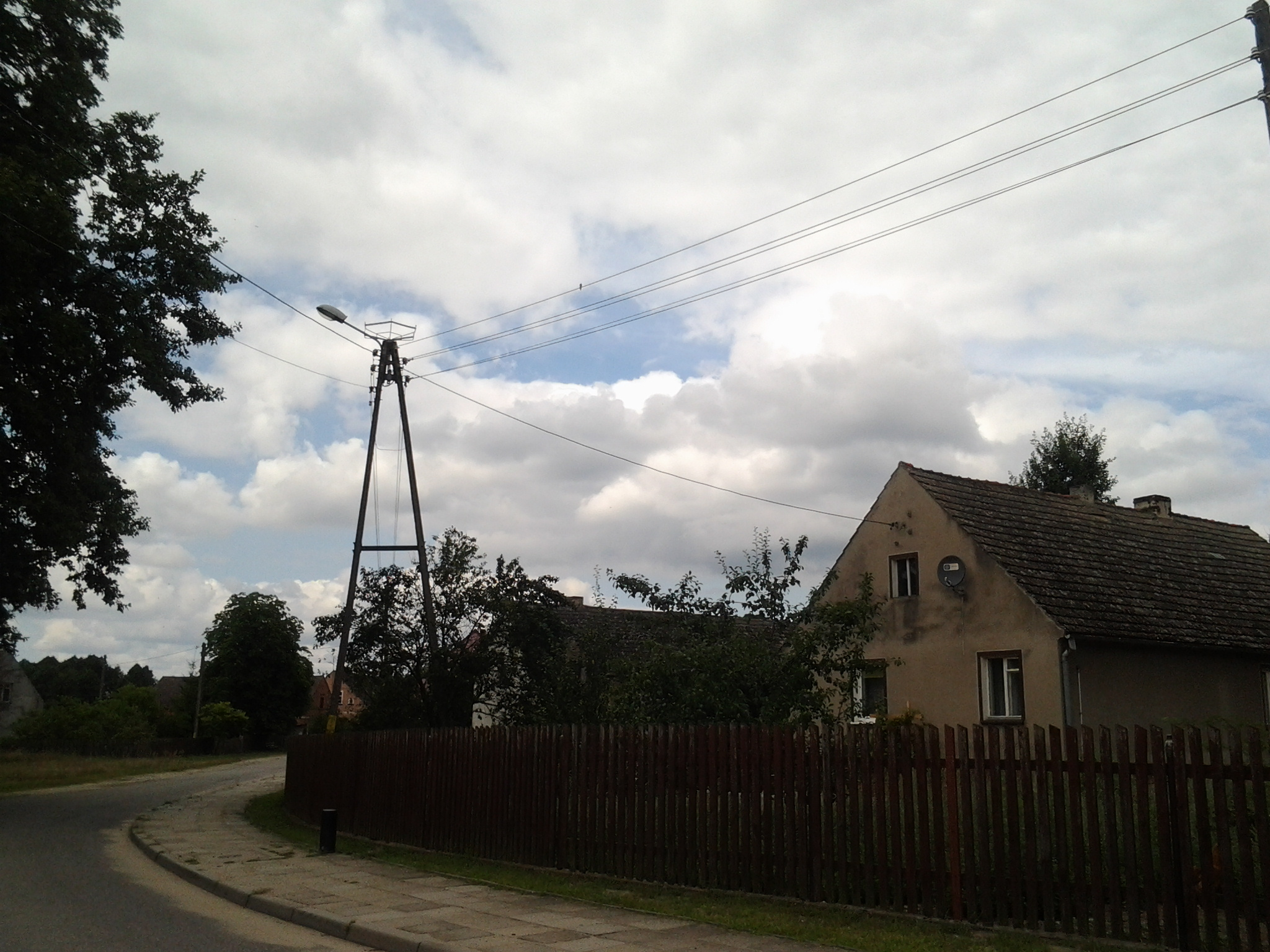
- Miłów in July 2014

- Location within Poland
- Coordinates: 52°5′N 14°51′E
- Country: Poland
- Voivodeship: Lubusz
- County: Krosno
- Gmina: Maszewo
- Population: 150

Miłów ([ˈmiwuf]; German: Mühlow) is a village in the administrative district of Gmina Maszewo, within Krosno County, Lubusz Voivodeship, in western Poland.

== Notable residents ==
- Willi Reschke (1922-2017), Luftwaffe pilot
