= Lubogoszcz, Gmina Maszewo =

Lubogoszcz
- Village
- Location within Poland
- Coordinates: 52°5′50″N 14°57′29″E
- Country: Poland
- Voivodeship: Lubusz
- County: Krosno
- Gmina: Maszewo
- Population: 500

Lubogoszcz ([luˈbɔɡɔʂt͡ʂ]; German: Eichdorf) is a village in the administrative district of Gmina Maszewo, within Krosno County, Lubusz Voivodeship, in western Poland.
