= Trzebiechów, Gmina Maszewo =

Trzebiechów
- Village
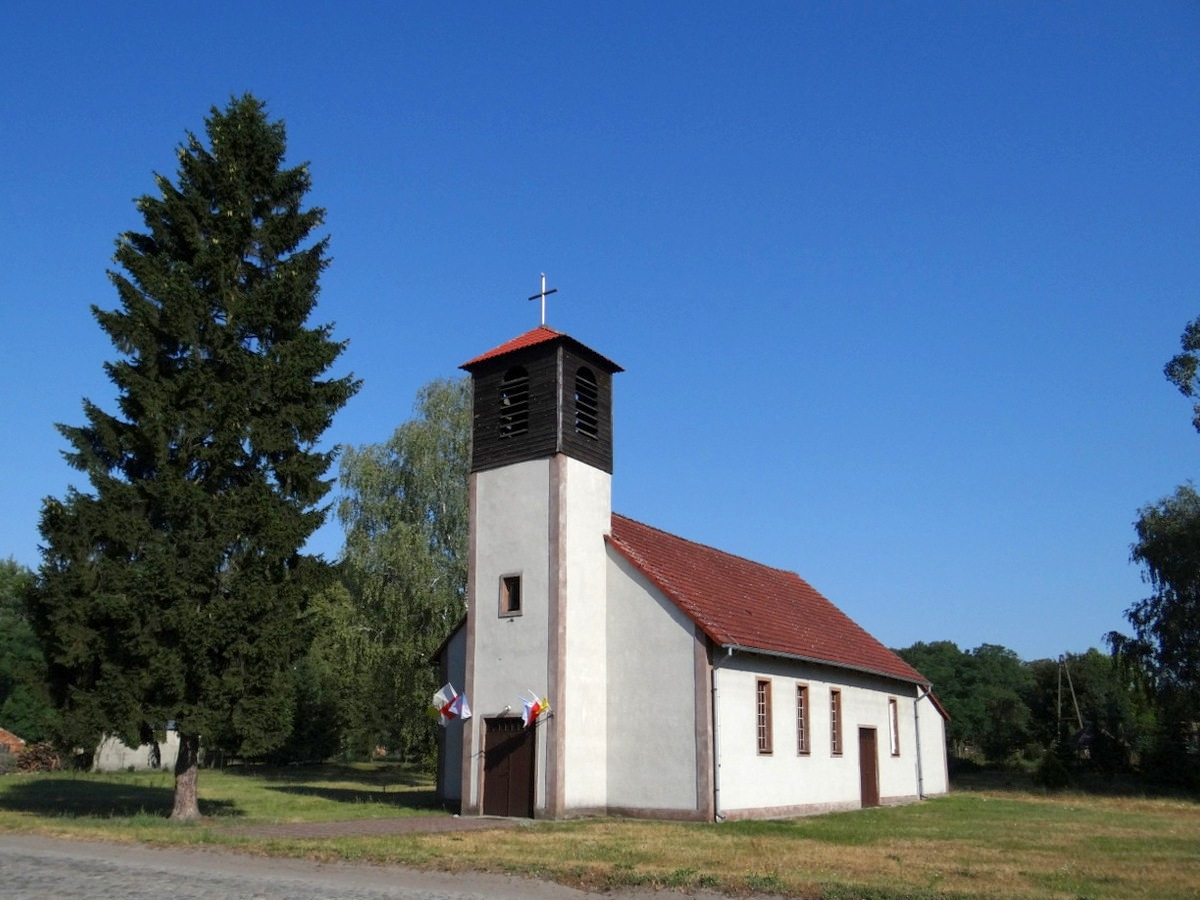
- Catholic church

- Location within Poland
- Coordinates: 52°09′37″N 14°57′12″E
- Country: Poland
- Voivodeship: Lubusz
- County: Krosno
- Gmina: Maszewo

Trzebiechów ([tʂɛˈbjɛxuf]; German: Trebichow) is a village in the administrative district of Gmina Maszewo, within Krosno County, Lubusz Voivodeship, in western Poland.
