= Gmina Maszewo, Lubusz Voivodeship =

Gmina Maszewo Maszewo Commune
- Gmina
- Coat of arms
- Interactive map of Gmina Maszewo
- Coordinates (Maszewo): 52°4′4″N 14°54′27″E
- Country: Poland
- Voivodeship: Lubusz
- County: Krosno
- Seat: Maszewo

Area
  - Total: 213.56 km^{2} (82.46 sq mi)

Population (2019-06-30)
  - Total: 2,812
  - Density: 13.17/km^{2} (34.10/sq mi)
- Website: https://www.maszewo.pl/

Gmina Maszewo is a rural gmina (administrative district) in Krosno County, Lubusz Voivodeship, in western Poland. Its seat is the village of Maszewo, which lies approximately 14 kilometres (9 mi) west of Krosno Odrzańskie and 44 km (27 mi) west of Zielona Góra.

The gmina covers an area of 213.56 square kilometres (82.5 sq mi), and as of 2019 its total population is 2,812.

The gmina contains part of the protected area called Krzesin Landscape Park.

== Villages ==
Gmina Maszewo contains the villages and settlements of Bytomiec, Chlebów, Gęstowice, Granice, Korczyców, Lubogoszcz, Maszewo, Miłów, Połęcko, Radomicko, Rybaki, Rzeczyca, Siedlisko, Skarbona, Skórzyn and Trzebiechów.

== Neighbouring gminas ==
Gmina Maszewo is bordered by the gminas of Bytnica, Cybinka, Gubin, Krosno Odrzańskie and Torzym.

== Twin towns – sister cities ==
Gmina Maszewo is twinned with:

- Loitz, Germany
- Mölln, Germany
