= Osthaus-Museum Hagen =

Art museum in Germany

Coordinates: 51°21′22″N 7°28′23″E

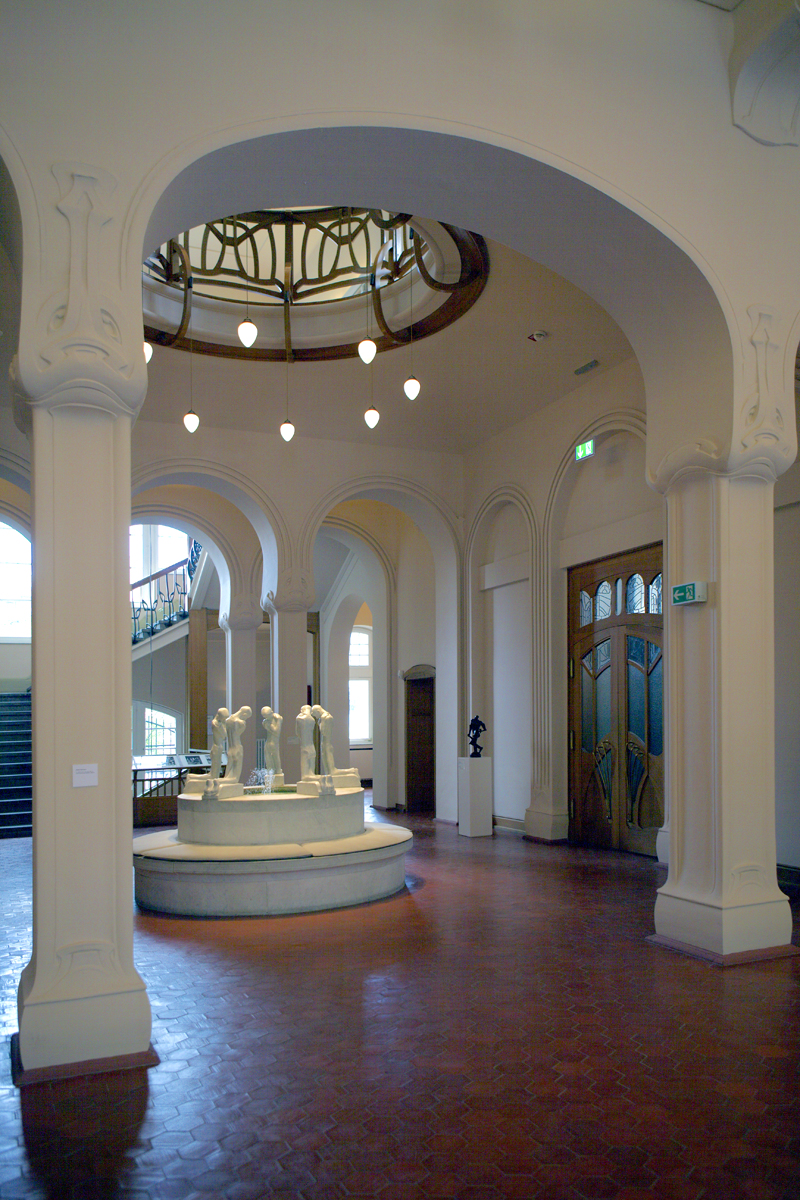
Entrance hall of the villa

Osthaus-Museum Hagen, North Rhine-Westphalia

The Karl Ernst Osthaus-Museum is an art museum in Hagen, North Rhine-Westphalia, Germany. The center of the museum is a building whose interior was designed by Henry van de Velde to house Karl Ernst Osthaus' art collection, open to the public as the Museum Folkwang. When Osthaus' heirs sold his art collection to the city of Essen, the city of Hagen gained possession of the empty museum building. For a time it served as offices for the local electric company.

After World War II, the new director of Hagen's city art museum, Herta Hesse, oversaw the restoration of the old Folkwang building into a new home for Hagen's art museum. Although the original interior design was lost due to reconstruction and World War II bombings, the interior has been restored several times and gives a reasonable approximation of Osthaus' original museum, if not its collection. Under her direction, the museum focused on recapturing what the city had lost when the Folkwang collection was sold to Essen. The museum became a focus for exhibits of Art Nouveau and expressionist art, particularly the artists associated with Osthaus or his art colony.

Under Michael Fehr, the Karl Ernst Osthaus-Museum adopted a more playful attitude toward local history. Large installations created sensations in the city, and numerous works poke fun at Hagen's inability to transcend the Osthaus past.

The painting collection stems from private donations and gradual purchases. It houses one of the main collections of paintings by Christian Rohlfs and the most important collection of paintings by Emil Schumacher. Both are considered Hagen artists. Other notable works on exhibit include environmental art by Herman de Vries, and the German branch of the Museum of Jurassic Technology.

The Karl Ernst Osthaus-Museum also houses the Karl Ernst Osthaus-Archive, a major depository of documents relating to the Folkwang Museum and early 20th century avant garde art and architecture.
