= List of World War II aces from Germany =

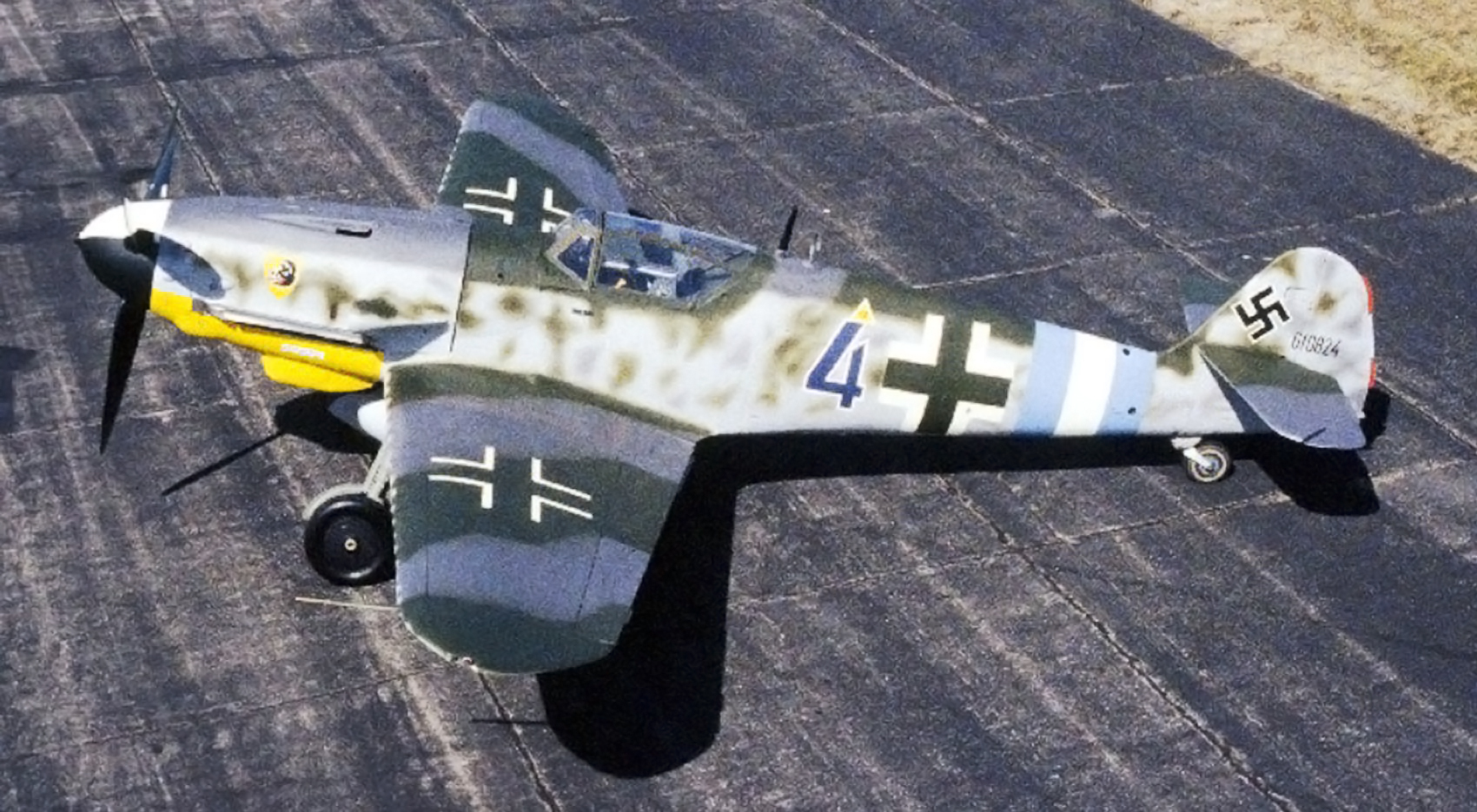
Two aircraft were the backbone of the Luftwaffe fighter force during World War II: the Messerschmitt Bf 109 (shown above) and the Focke-Wulf Fw 190.

This is a list of fighter aces in World War II from Germany. A flying ace or fighter ace is a military aviator credited with shooting down five or more enemy aircraft during aerial combat. It is relatively certain that 2,500 German fighter pilots attained ace status, having achieved at least five aerial victories.

German day and night fighter pilots claimed roughly 70,000 aerial victories during World War II, over 25,000 British or American and over 45,000 Soviet aircraft. 103 German fighter pilots each shot down 100 or more enemy aircraft, for a total of approximately 15,400 victories. Approximately 360 German fighter pilots shot down from 40 to 99 enemy aircraft for a total of approximately 21,000 victories.

Approximately 500 German fighter pilots shot down from 20 to 39 enemy aircraft for a total of approximately 15,000 victories. These achievements were honored with 453 German day fighter pilots and Zerstörer (destroyer) fighter pilots and 85 German night fighter pilots (including 14 crew members), for a total of 538 German fighter pilots, receiving the Knight's Cross of the Iron Cross.

German losses were very high as well. Roughly 12,000 German day fighter pilots were killed or are still missing in action, with a further 6,000 being wounded. The Zerstörer (destroyer) pilots suffered about 2,800 casualties, either killed or missing in action, plus another 900 wounded in action. German night fighter losses were also high, in the magnitude of 3,800 pilots or crew members killed or missing and 1,400 wounded. Hans-Ulrich Rudel was the most decorated flying ace in the Luftwaffe, primarily as a ground-attack bomber pilot with over 800 vehicles destroyed in addition to his victories over opposing aircraft.

== Background ==
There are a number of reasons why Germany's highest-scoring pilots shot down many more aircraft than the most successful Allied pilots. During the first years of the war, German day fighter pilots tended to enjoy favourable tactical circumstances; for instance, during the Battle of Britain British pilots generally tried to attack the German bombers rather than the fighters protecting them. German combat tactics during this period also tended to be superior to those of the Allies, with formation leaders in particular often having a higher chance of success.

Formal and informal Luftwaffe practices also contributed to the high numbers of victories achieved by some pilots. The normal practice in fighter units was for the highest-scoring pilot to lead formations, regardless of their rank, which placed them in the best position to shoot down Allied aircraft. The German pilots also typically conducted much more combat flying than their Allied equivalents: while the western Allied air forces frequently rested their fighter pilots or rotated them out of combat zones after a certain number of missions or flying hours, German pilots were required to fly until they became casualties.

=== Accuracy of claims ===
In the 1990s, the German archives made available to the public, including microfilm rolls of wartime records not seen since January 1945. They show that although the Luftwaffe generally did not accept a "kill" without a witness (in which instance it was considered only a probable and didn't count in the victory scoring process), some pilots habitually submitted unwitnessed claims and these sometimes made it through the verification process, particularly if they were made by pilots with established records.

Unlike all of the other air forces that fought during World War II, the Luftwaffe did not accept shared claims, but sometimes it happened. Each claim should have referred to a particular aircraft, but some victories were awarded to other pilots who had claimed the destruction of the same aircraft. From mid 1943 to 1944, the OKW communiques often overstated Allied bomber losses by a factor of up to two. These claims existed only in the communiques and weren't used in victory scoring.

Defenders of the German fighter pilots maintain that overclaims were eliminated during the confirmation process, but the microfilms show that this wasn't always the case. Stringent reviews and comparisons of Allied archives and German archives show that 90 percent of the claims submitted were confirmed, or found to be "in order" for confirmation, up to the time the system broke down altogether in 1945.

== Aces ==
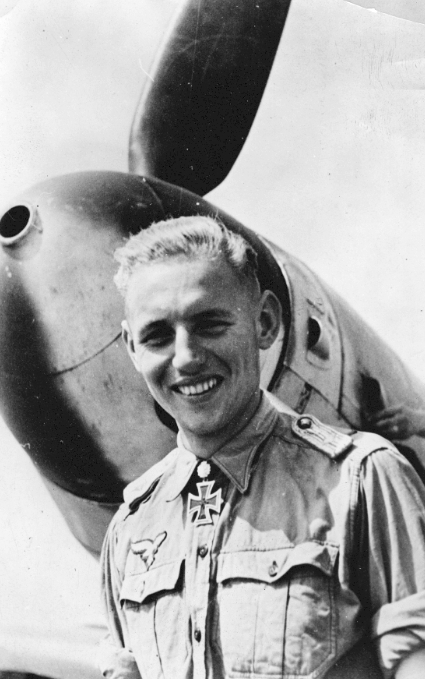
Erich Hartmann, the highest scoring German and all time ace

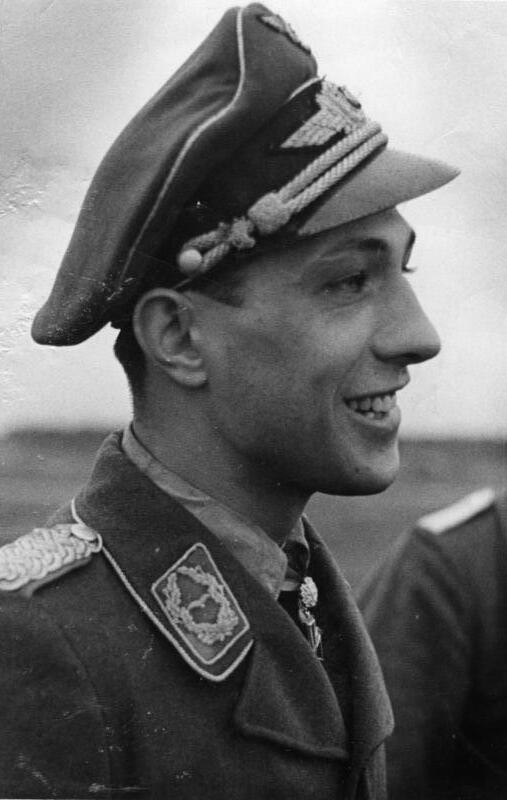
Erich Rudorffer, claimed thirteen aerial victories on a single mission

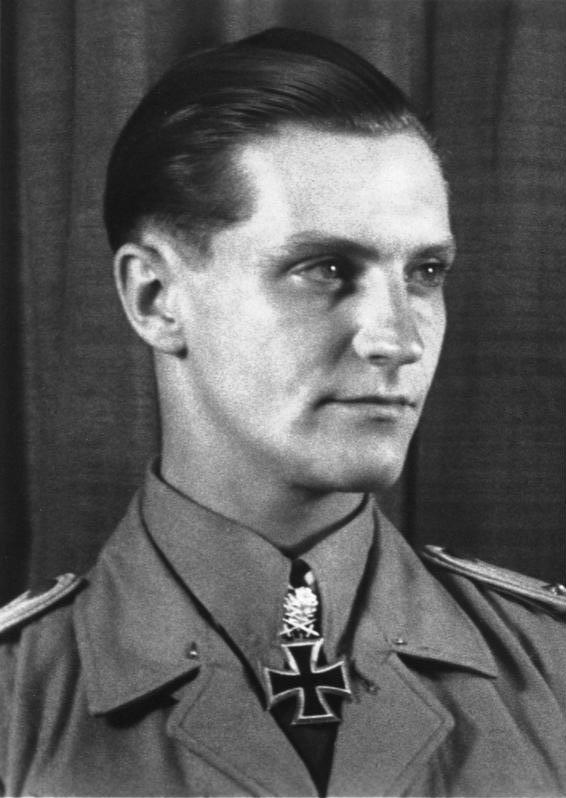
Hans-Joachim Marseille, the highest scoring German ace over the Western Allies

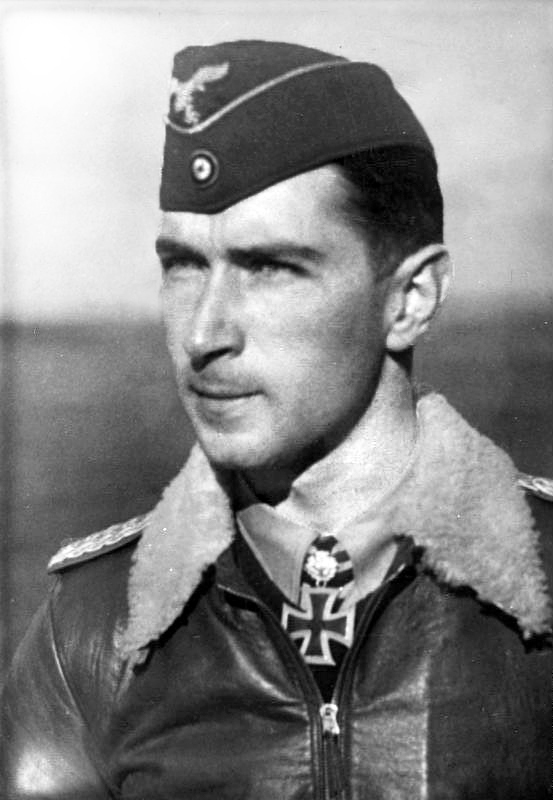
Werner Mölders, the first pilot to claim 100 aerial victories

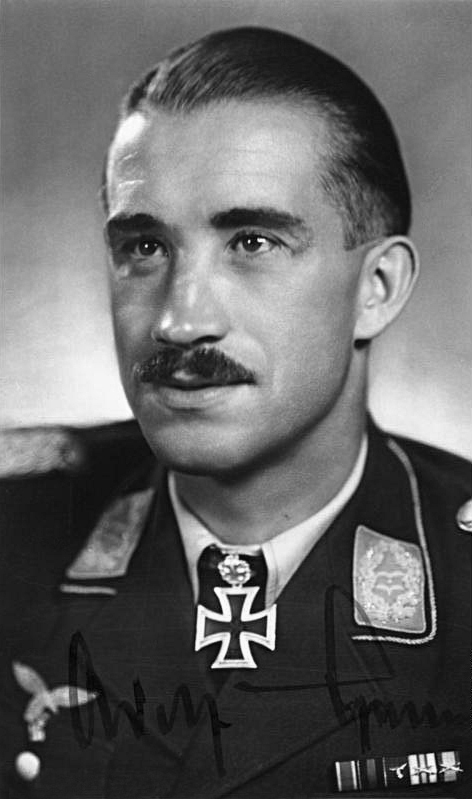
Adolf Galland, the last pilot to claim 100 aerial victories

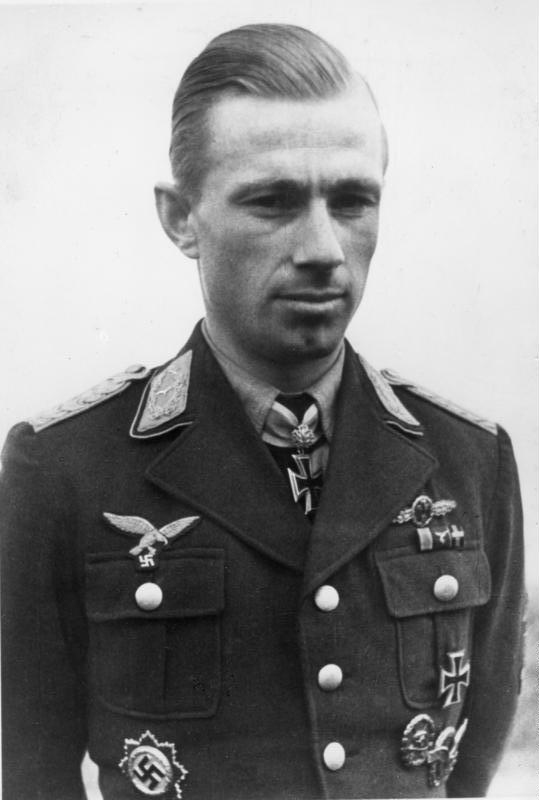
Helmut Lent, the first night fighter pilot to claim 100 aerial victories

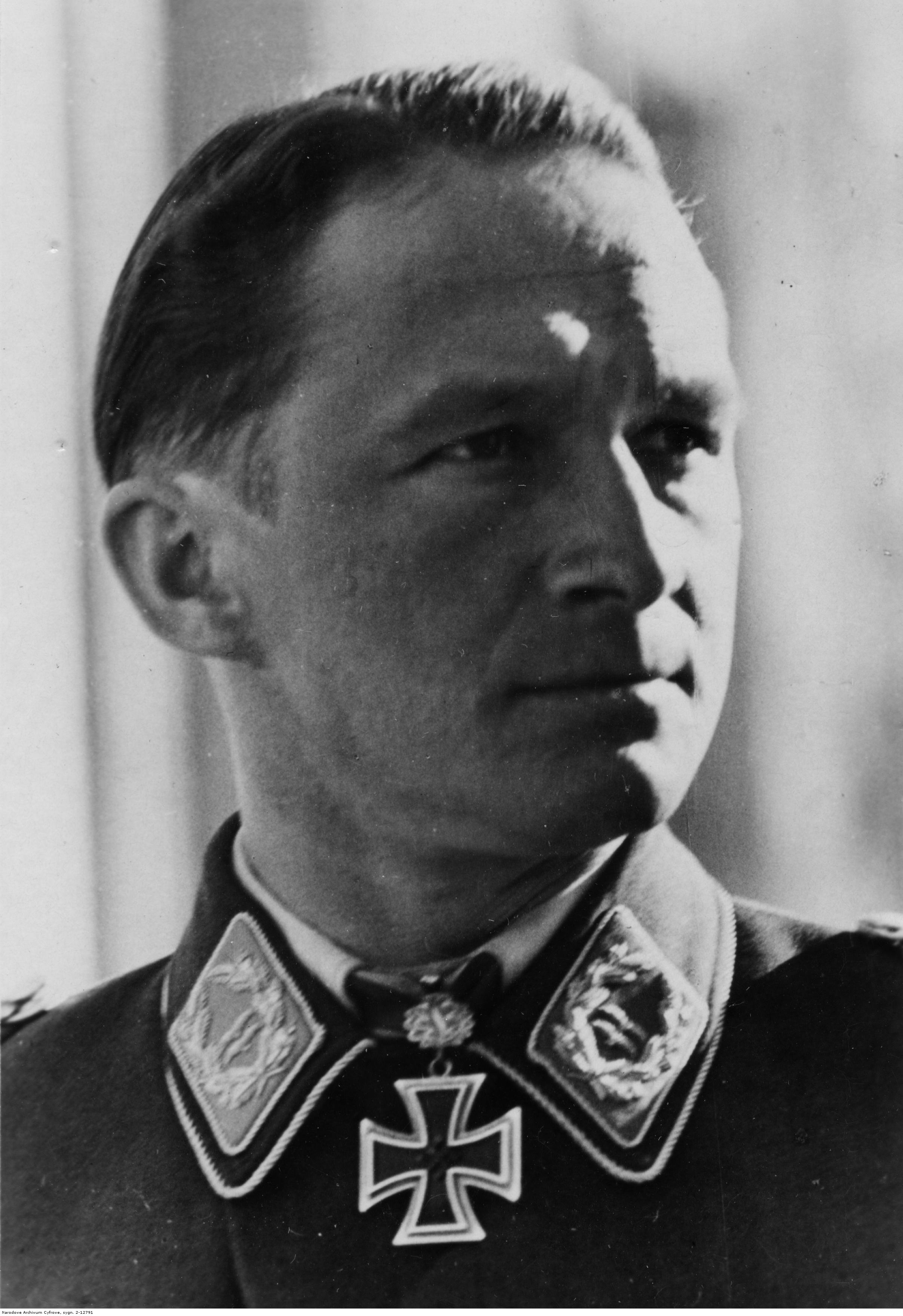
Egon Mayer, claimed 26 heavy bombers shot down

By surname: A–F • G–L • M–P • Q–S • T–Z

== Pilots with more than 100 aerial victory claims ==
Obermaier identifies 103 Luftwaffe pilots credited with more than 100 aerial victories. Mathews and Foreman, using records from the German Federal Archives and distinguishing between confirmed and unconfirmed claims, identify 94 pilots in this category. The following pilots appear in Obermaier's list but are not included in the corresponding category by Mathews and Foreman:

- Eberhard von Boremski, listed with at least 88 aerial victories, plus two unconfirmed claims, potentially further aerial victories with EJG 1.
- Kurt Bühligen, listed with 99 aerial victory claims, plus nine further unconfirmed claims.
- Walther Dahl, claimed at least 90 aerial victories, plus further 13 unconfirmed claims.
- Siegfried Freytag, listed with 89 aerial victories.
- Friedrich Geißhardt, listed with 93 aerial victory claims, plus eight further unconfirmed claims.
- Hartmann Grasser, listed with more than 96 aerial victory claims, plus six further unconfirmed claims.
- Kurt Tanzer, listed with at least 35 aerial victories.
- Kurt Ubben, listed with 93 aerial victory claims, plus 13 further unconfirmed claims.
- Franz Woidich, listed with 82 aerial victory claims, plus thirty further unconfirmed claims.

Other published sources give higher victory totals for several pilots. Spick credits Horst-Günther von Fassong with 136 victories, Rudolf Rademacher with 126, and Herbert Rollwage with 102. Zabecki credits Friedrich Wachowiak with 140 victories, and Paul-Heinrich Dähne with 100. Toliver and Constable credit Rudolf Müller with 101 victories.

This along with the ! (exclamation mark), indicates the first pilot to reach the 100th, 150th, 200th, 250th, or 300th victory claim.
This and the ? (question mark) indicates information discrepancies listed by Obermaier, Prien, Stemmer, Rodeike, Bock, Mathews and Foreman.

Name	100th Claim	150th Claim	200th Claim	250th Claim	300th Claim
Werner Mölders	15 July 1941!				
Günther Lützow	24 October 1941				
Walter Oesau	26 October 1941				
Hans Philipp	31 March 1942	14 January 1943	17 March 1943		
Herbert Ihlefeld	22 April 1942				
Max-Hellmuth Ostermann	12 May 1942				
Hermann Graf	14 May 1942	4 September 1942	26 September 1942!		
Adolf Dickfeld	18 May 1942				
Heinrich Bär	19 May 1942	27 January 1943	22 April 1944		
Gordon Gollob	20 May 1942	29 August 1942!			
Hans-Joachim Marseille	17 June 1942	15 September 1942			
Erwin Clausen	22 July 1942				
Heinrich Setz	24 July 1942				
Viktor Bauer	25 July 1942				
Franz-Josef Beerenbrock	1 August 1942				
Anton Hackl	5 August 1942	9 July 1944			
Kurt Brändle	22 August 1942	5 July 1943			
Johannes Steinhoff	31 August 1942	2 February 1943			
Joachim Müncheberg	5 September 1942				
Wolf-Dietrich Wilcke	6 September 1942	17 December 1942			
Heinz Schmidt	15 September 1942	12 August 1943			
Friedrich-Karl "Tutti" Müller	19 September 1942				
Wilhelm Crinius	22 September 1942				
Wolfgang Tonne	22 September 1942				
Hans Beißwenger	30 September 1942	5 March 1943			
Ernst-Wilhelm Reinert	3 October 1942	25 April 1943			
Günther Rall	22 October 1942	7 August 1943	29 August 1943	28 November 1943	
Josef Zwernemann	25 October 1942				
Max Stotz	29 October 1942	26 January 1943			
Friedrich Geißhardt	10 November 1942				
Gerhard Barkhorn	19 December 1942	8 August 1943	30 November 1943	12 February 1944	5 January 1945
Hartmann Grasser	2 January 1943				
Kurt Ubben	14 January 1943				
Hans "Assi" Hahn	26 January 1943				
Wilhelm Lemke	16 March 1943				
Alfred Grislawski	27 April 1943				
Joachim Kirschner	27 April 1943	5 July 1943			
Hans Dammers	5 May 1943				
Wolf-Udo Ettel	6 May 1943				
Heinrich Ehrler	8 June 1943	25 May 1944	20 November 1944		
Rudolf Miethig	8 June 1943				
Walter Nowotny	15 June 1943	18 August 1943	8 September 1943	14 October 1943!	
Theodor Weissenberger	4 July 1943	25 March 1944	25 July 1944		
Reinhard Seiler	6 July 1943				
Johannes Wiese	17 July 1943				
Emil Bitsch	21 July 1943				
Werner Lucas	21 July 1943				
Dietrich Hrabak	2 August 1943				
Karl-Heinz Weber	12 August 1943				
Berthold Korts	17 August 1943				
Walter Krupinski	18 August 1943	12 October 1943			
Günther Schack	3 September 1943	13 August 1944			
Otto Kittel	14 September 1943	4 April 1944	26 August 1944	27 October 1944	
Erich Hartmann	20 September 1943	13 December 1943	26 March 1944	4 June 1944	24 August 1944!
Erich Rudorffer	11 October 1943	26 July 1944	28 October 1944		
Anton Hafner	15 October 1943	16 July 1944	16 October 1944		
Albin Wolf	25 October 1943				
Emil Lang	2 November 1943	14 June 1944			
Erich Leie	6 November 1943				
Joachim Brendel	22 November 1943	22 October 1944			
Otto Fönnekold	12 January 1944				
Horst Ademeit	15 January 1944	28 May 1944			
Egon Mayer	5 February 1944				
Wilhelm Batz	22 March 1944	31 May 1944	17 August 1944		
Heinrich Sturm	23 March 1944	December 1944? (Note: Mathews and Foreman, who researched the German Federal Archives, state that Sturm is attributed with 158 aerial victories. The archives revealed records for 123 of these claims. However, there are 52 additional claims attributed to II. Gruppe of JG 52 in the timeframe November to December 1944 that have no names associated to them. The authors assume that many of these claims belong to Sturm.)			
Heinrich Sterr	31 March 1944				
Helmut Lipfert	11 April 1944	24 October 1944	8 April 1945		
Hans Waldmann	11 April 1944				
Gerhard Hoffmann	22 April 1944? (Note: According to Obermaier on 16 March 1944, making him the 65th Luftwaffe pilot to achieve the century mark.)				
Fritz Tegtmeier	3 May 1944				
Karl Gratz	6 May 1944				
Robert Weiß	19 May 1944				
Werner Schröer	24 May 1944				
Walter Wolfrum	1 June 1944				
Kurt Bühligen	7 June 1944				
Heinz Sachsenberg	8 June 1944				
Josef Wurmheller	8 June 1944? (Note: According to Obermaier on 16 June 1944, making him the 80th Luftwaffe pilot to achieve the century mark.)				
Siegfried Freytag	13 June 1944? (Note: According to Obermaier in December 1944, making him the 96th Luftwaffe pilot to achieve the century mark.)				
Josef Priller	15 June 1944				
Walter Schuck	15 June 1944	23 August 1944	24 March 1945		
Helmut Lent	16 June 1944				
Kurt Tanzer	June 1944				
Rudolf Trenkel	14 July 1944				
Jakob Norz	17 July 1944				
Franz Woidich	20 July 1944				
Günther Josten	20 July 1944	17 February 1945			
Friedrich Obleser	21 July 1944? (Note: According to Obermaier in August 1944, making him the 87th Luftwaffe pilot to achieve the century mark.)				
Adolf Borchers	24 July 1944				
Franz Dörr	23 August 1944				
Franz Schall	31 August 1944				
Franz Eisenach	14 September 1944				
Heinz Wernicke	14 September 1944				
Peter Düttmann	24 September 1944	15 April 1945			
Gerhard Thyben	30 September 1944	23 February 1945			
Heinz-Wolfgang Schnaufer	9 October 1944				
Hans-Joachim Birkner	16 October 1944				
Eberhard von Boremski	January 1945				
Walther Dahl	28 February 1945				
Bernhard Vechtel	25 March 1945				
Ulrich Wernitz	26 March 1945				
August Lambert	April 1945				
Heinz Marquardt	14 April 1945				
Adolf Galland	21 April 1945				

== Heavy bomber aces ==
The Luftwaffe fighter force was responsible for defending German-occupied territory against Allied air attacks, initially by RAF Bomber Command and subsequently by the United States Army Air Forces (USAAF) during the Combined Bomber Offensive. The interception of American heavy bombers, particularly Boeing B-17 Flying Fortresses operating in combat box formations, presented a significant challenge to German daytime fighter operations. The destruction of a heavy bomber, or the Herausschuss (separation shot)—a severely damaged heavy bomber forced to separate from its combat box which was counted as an aerial victory—were considered an exceptional achievement.

In 1943, the Luftwaffe introduced a point system which accounted for the difficulties in shooting down a heavy bomber. Although a single heavy bomber shot down or damaged still counted as one aerial victory, the accumulated points earned a fighter pilot awards, medals and promotions. The point system worked as follows:

- Three points were granted for the destruction of heavy bomber.
- Two points were earned for the Herausschuss of a heavy bomber.
- One point was awarded for the endgültige Vernichtung (final destruction), a coup de grâce inflicted on an already damaged heavy bomber.
This along with the * (asterisk), indicates that the pilot was either killed in action (KIA), missing in action (MIA), died of wounds (DOW) or killed in a flying accident (KIFA).
This and the / (slash) indicates information discrepancies listed by Aders, Caldwell, Forsyth, Girbig, Held, Obermaier, Spick, Ring, Mathews, Foreman and Zabecki.

Name	Heavy bomber claims	Total wartime claims	Unit	Notes
Herbert Rollwage	44/14/10	102	JG 53, JG 106	Knight's Cross with Oak Leaves
Georg-Peter Eder	36/23+	78/50+	JG 51, JG 2, JG 1, JG 26, Kdo Nowotny, EJG 2, JG 7	Knight's Cross with Oak Leaves
Anton Hackl	34/16+	192/180+	JG 77, JG 11, JG 26, JG 300	Knight's Cross with Oak Leaves and Swords
Konrad Bauer	32/13	68/38+	JG 51, JG 3, JG 300	Knight's Cross
Walther Dahl	30/22+	129/128/90+	JG 3, JG z.b.v., JG 300, EJG 2	Knight's Cross with Oak Leaves
Werner Schroer	26/23	114/106	JG 3, JG 27, JG 54	Knight's Cross with Oak Leaves and Swords
Egon Mayer*	26/27	102	JG 2	Knight's Cross with Oak Leaves and Swords; KIA 2 March 1944
Rolf Hermichen	26	64	ZG 1, ZG 76, SKG 210, JG 26, JG 11, JG 104	Knight's Cross with Oak Leaves
Hermann Staiger	26	63	JG 51, JG 26, JG 1, JG 7	Knight's Cross
Anton-Rudolf Piffer*	26/21	35/29/26	JG 1	Knight's Cross; KIA 17 June 1944
Hugo Frey*	25	32	JG 1, JG 11	Knight's Cross; KIA 6 March 1944
Alwin Doppler*	25/17	21	JG 1, JG 11	German Cross; KIA 1 January 1945
Kurt Bühligen	24	112/99+	JG 2	Knight's Cross with Oak Leaves and Swords
Hans Ehlers*	24	55	JG 3, JG 1	Knight's Cross; KIA 27 December 1944
Friedrich-Karl "Tutti" Müller*	23	140/139	JG 53, JG 3	Knight's Cross with Oak Leaves; KIA 29 May 1944
Heinrich Wurzel	23/11	26/12	JG 302, JG 301	German Cross
Walter Loos	22	38	JG 3, JG 301	Knight's Cross
Hans Weik	22	36	JG 3, EJGr Ost, EJG 2	Knight's Cross
Werner Gerth*	22	38	JG 3, JG 300, JG 400	Knight's Cross; KIA 2 November 1944
Heinrich Bär	21	222/220/208	JG 51, JG 77, JG 1, JG 3, EJG 2, JV 44	Knight's Cross with Oak Leaves and Swords
Fritz Karch	21	47	JG 2	Knight's Cross
Willy Unger	21	22/21	JG 3, JG 7	Knight's Cross
Josef Wurmheller*	20+	102/103	JG 53, JG 2	Knight's Cross with Oak Leaves and Swords; KIA 22 June 1944
Willy Kientsch*	20	53	JG 27	Knight's Cross with Oak Leaves; KIA 29 January 1944
Hans-Heinrich Koenig	20	28	ZG 76, NJG 3, JG 11	Knight's Cross
Willi Reschke	20	28	JG 302, JG 301	Knight's Cross
Adolf Glunz	20/17	71/69	JG 52, JG 26, JG 7	Knight's Cross with Oak Leaves
Klaus Neumann	19/17+	37	JG 51, JG 3, JG 7, JV 44	Knight's Cross
Heinz Knoke	19/13	33/15	JG 1, JG 11	Knight's Cross
Alfred Grislawski	18/14	133/127	JG 52, JG 1	Knight's Cross with Oak Leaves
Anton Benning	18	28/13+	JG 106, JG 301	Knight's Cross
Herbert Huppertz*	17	68	JG 51, JG 5, JG 2	Knight's Cross with Oak Leaves; KIA 8 June 1944
Eduard Isken	17	56	JG 77, JGr 200, I(F)/123, JG 53	Knight's Cross
Waldemar Radener	17/12	37/23	JG 26, JG 300	Knight's Cross
Klaus Bretschneider*	17/15	34/22	JG 300	Knight's Cross; KIA 24 December 1944
Rudolf Rademacher	16	126/93	JG 54, JG 7	Knight's Cross
Johann Pichler	16/10	75/39	JG 77	Knight's Cross
Ernst Börngen	16	45/41	JG 27	Knight's Cross
Friedrich "Fritz" Stehle	16	21	ZG 2, ZG 26, JG 6, JG 7	German Cross
Leopold Münster*	15	95	JG 3	Knight's Cross with Oak Leaves; KIA 8 May 1944
Otto Wessling	15	83	JG 3	Knight's Cross with Oak Leaves; KIA 19 April 1944
Günther Specht*	15	34	ZG 26, JG 1, JG 11	Knight's Cross; KIA 1 January 1945
Gerhard Sommer*	15/14	20	JG 11, JG 1	Knight's Cross; KIA 12 May 1944
Rudi Zwesken	14+	52/23+	JG 52, JG 300	Knight's Cross
Erwin Clausen*	14	132/100	JG 77, JG 11	Knight's Cross with Oak Leaves; KIA 4 October 1943
Walter Oesau*	14	125 (incl. 8 in Spain)/127	JG 1, JG 2, JG 51, J/88	Knight's Cross with Oak Leaves and Swords; KIA 11 May 1944
Erwin Laskowski	14	46	JG 51, JG 11	Knight's Cross
Walter Matoni	14	34	JG 27, JG 26, JG 2, JG 11	Knight's Cross
Peter Werfft	14	26	JG 27	Knight's Cross
Gustav Rödel	13	98	JG 27	Knight's Cross with Oak Leaves
Gerhard Michalski	13	73	JG 53, JG 4	Knight's Cross with Oak Leaves
Klaus Mietusch*	13	72	JG 26	Knight's Cross with Oak Leaves; KIA 17 September 1944
Armin Köhler	13	69	JG 27, JG 77	Knight's Cross
Erich Hohagen	13	56	JG 51, JG 2, JG 27, JG 7, JV 44	Knight's Cross
Franz Ruhl*	13/12	36	JG 3	Knight's Cross; KIA 24 December 1944
Gustav Sturm	13	21	JG 27, JG 3, JG 51, EJG 2, JG 7	
Siegfried Schnell*	12+	93	JG 54, JG 2	Knight's Cross with Oak Leaves; KIA 25 February 1944
Wilhelm Moritz	12	44/41	JG 51, JG 3	Knight's Cross
Rudi Dassow	12	22	ZG 1, ZG 76, JG 6	Knight's Cross
Peter Jenne	12	17/12+	ZG 1, ZG 26, JG 300	Knight's Cross; KIA 2 March 1945
Erich Rudorffer	11	222/219	JG 2, JG 54, JG 7	Knight's Cross with Oak Leaves and Swords
Karl Willius*	11	50	JG 26	Knight's Cross; KIA 8 April 1944
Karl Rammelt	11	46/41	JG 51	Knight's Cross
Oskar Zimmermann	11	34/28+	JG 51, JG 3	Knight's Cross
Friedrich May*	11	27	JG 2	German Cross; KIA 20 October 1943
Ekkehard Tichy*	11/5	25	JG 53, JG 3	Knight's Cross; KIA 16 August 1944
Siegfried Zick	11	20	JG 1, JG 11	
Hans Iffland	11	11	JG 3	
Jürgen Hörschelmann*	11	16	JG 3	KIA 12 May 1944
Hans Schrangl	11	12	JG 11, JG 7	
Josef Priller	10	101	JG 51, JG 26	Knight's Cross with Oak Leaves and Swords
Hans Grünberg	10	82/78	JG 3, JG 52, JG 7 JV 44	Knight's Cross
Eugen-Ludwig Zweigart*	10	69/66	JG 54	Knight's Cross; KIA 8 June 1944
Jürgen Harder*	10	64	JG 53, JG 11	Knight's Cross with Oak Leaves; KIFA 17 February 1945
Hermann Buchner	10	58	SG 2, JG 7	Knight's Cross
Horst Haase*	10	62/54	JG 51, JG 3	Knight's Cross; KIA 26 November 1944
Karl-Heinz Bendert	10	55	JG 27, JG 104	Knight's Cross
Rudolf Klemm	10	42/43	JG 54, JG 26	Knight's Cross
Fritz Gromotka	10	29	JG 27	Knight's Cross
Herbert Schob	10	28 (incl. 6 in Spain)	LG 1, ZG 76, ZG 26	Knight's Cross
Leo Schuhmacher	10/3+	23/8+	ZG 76, JG 1, JV 44	Knight's Cross
Karl-Heinz Munsche*	10	22	JG 2	KIA 25 July 1944
Günther Wegmann	10	14	ZG 26, Kdo Nowotny, JG 7	German Cross
Otto Pritzl	10	11	JG 51, JG 302, JG 3, JG 7	
Dieter Zink	10	11	JG 3	
Emil-Rudolf Schnoor	9+	12	LG 1, JG 1, JG 11	
Karl "Quax" Schnörrer	9	46	JG 54, JG 7, Kdo Nowotny	Knight's Cross
Ernst Düllberg	9	45/43	JG 3, JG 27, JG 76, EJG 2, JG 7	Knight's Cross
Otto Russ*	9	27	JG 53	German Cross; KIA 2 July 1944
Ernst-Erich Hirschfeld*	9	24	JG 300, JG 54	Knight's Cross; KIA 28 July 1944
Walter Köhne	9	20+	JG 52, JG 1, JG 11, EJG 2	
Gerhard Vivroux	9	10	Sturmstaffel 1, JG 3	
Rudolf Metz*	9	10	JG 5, JG 3, JG 4	KIA 6 October 1944
Hubert Engst	8+	10+	JG 300	
Erich Hondt	8+	10+	JG 11, JV 44	
Heinrich Klöpper*	8	94	JG 51, JG 1	Knight's Cross; KIA 29 November 1943
Oskar Romm	8	92	JG 51, JG 3	Knight's Cross
Helmut Rüffler	8	98/88	JG 3	Knight's Cross
Günther Seeger	8	56	JG 53, JG 2	Knight's Cross
Wilhelm-Ferdinand (Wutz) Galland*	8	54/56	JG 26	Knight's Cross
Heinz-Gerhard Vogt*	8	48	JG 26	Knight's Cross; KIA 14 January 1945
Hans Remmer*	8	27/21	JG 27	Knight's Cross; KIA 2 April 1944
Karl Wünsch*	8	20	JG 27	German Cross; 21 November 1944
Willi Maximowitz*	8	15+	JG 1, JG 3	MIA 20 April 1945
Siegfried Müller	8	15	JG 51, JG 3, JG 7	German Cross
Kurt Gabler	8	14	JG 300	
Eberhard Schade	8	10	JG 27	
Hans-Ulrich Jung*	8	10	JG 3	KIA 1 January 1945
Heinz Angres*	8	8	JG 3	KIA 16 October 1944
Bernhard Kunze*	8	8	JG 1	KIA 5 January 1944
Rüdiger von Kirchmayr	7+	20±	JG 1, JG 11	
Ernst Haase*	7+	8+	JG 302	German Cross; KIA 25 February 1945
Heinrich Ehrler*	7	209/182+	JG 5, JG 7	Knight's Cross with Oak Leaves; KIA 4 April 1945
Theodor Weissenberger	7	208	JG 5, JG 7	Knight's Cross with Oak Leaves
Otto Schultz	7	73	JG 51	Knight's Cross
Johannes Naumann	7	34	JG 26, JG 6, JG 7	Knight's Cross
Harry Koch*	7	21+	JG 26, JG 1	German Cross; KIA 22 December 1943
Kurt Gren*	7	19	JG 51, JG 3	German Cross; KIA 23 August 1944
Oskar Bösch	7	18	JG 3, JG 301, JG 7	
Karl Paashaus*	7	15	JG 53	KIA 22 August 1944
Walter Hagenah	7	15	JG 3, JG 7	German Cross
Helmut Beckmann	7	13	JG 27	
Alexander Ottnad	7	12	JG 27	German Cross
Georg Schanz	7	9	JG 27	
Hans Pancritius*	7	7	JG 1, JG 11	KIA 17 July 1943
Emil-Karl Demuth	6+	10+	JG 1	German Cross
Rudolf Engleder	6+	8+	JG 1, EJG 2	
Hermann Graf	6	212/206	JG 52, JG 11	Knight's Cross with Oak Leaves, Swords and Diamonds
Walter Höckner*	6	68	JG 52, JG 77, JG 26, JG 1, JG 4	Knight's Cross; KIA 25 August 1944
Reinhold Hoffmann*	6/5	66	JG 54	Knight's Cross; KIA 24 May 1944
Herbert Kutscha	6	47	SKG 210, ZG 1, ZG 76, JG 3, JG 11, JG 27	Knight's Cross
Karl-Wilhelm Hofmann*	6	44	JG 26	Knight's Cross; KIA 26 March 1945
Artur Beese	6	22	JG 26	German Cross
Horst Rippert	6	18	JGr. 200, JG 27	German Cross
Hannes Löffler*	6	10	JG 27	KIA 29 June 1944
Rudolf Hübl	6	9	JG 1	
Karl-Heinz Kapp*	6	9	JG 27	KIA 6 August 1944
Franz Steiner	6	8	JG 27, JG 1, JG 11, JV 44	
Willi Hallenberger	6	6	JG 51, JG 302	
Hans Schäfer	6	6	JG 3	
Herbert Stephan	6	6	JG 302	
Helmut Lennartz	5+	8+	JG 1, JG 11, JG 6, JG 7	
Franz Schall*	5	137/133	JG 52, Kdo Nowotny, JG 7	Knight's Cross; KIFA 10 April 1945
Josef Zwernemann*	5	126/123	JG 52, JG 11	Knight's Cross with Oak Leaves; KIA 8 April 1944
Franz Götz	5	63	JG 53, JG 26	Knight's Cross
Heinz Arnold*	5	49/48	JG 5, JG 7	KIA 17 April 1945
Bruno Stolle	5	35	JG 2	Knight's Cross
Albert Böckl	5	10	JG 26, Kdo Nowotny, JG 7	
Artur Groß	5	10	JG 300, JG 302, JG 106	
Erich Schwarz	5	10	JG 26	
Gerhard Bärsdorf	5	7	JG Hermann, JG 300	
Karl-Heinz Böttner	5	6	JG 77	
