= Konrad Bauer =

German fighter ace and Knight's Cross recipient (1919–1990)

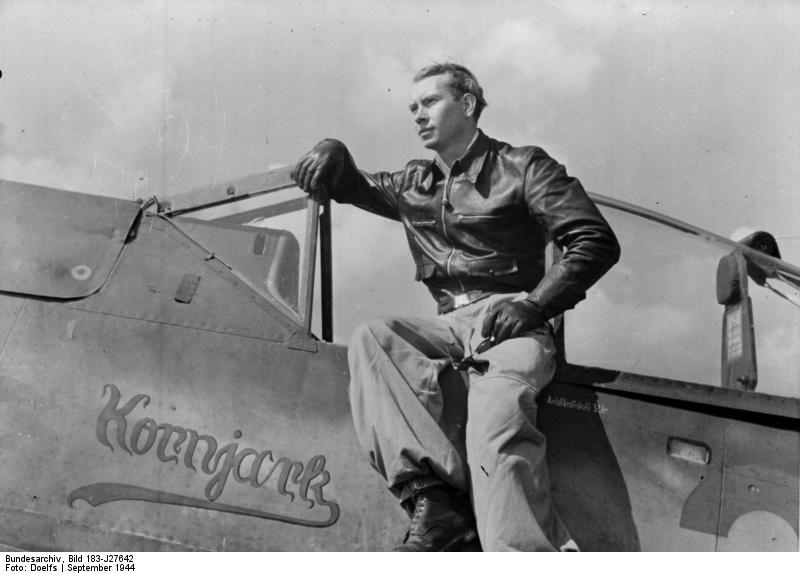
- Born: 9 February 1919; Gelsenkirchen
- Died: 17 June 1990 (aged 71); Gelsenkirchen
- Military career
- Allegiance: Nazi Germany (to 1945); West Germany
- Branch: Luftwaffe; German Air Force
- Service years: 1939–1945 ?–1960
- Rank: Oberleutnant (Wehrmacht); Hauptmann (Bundeswehr)
- Nickname: "Pitt"
- Units: JG 51, JG 3, JG 300
- Conflicts: World War II: Eastern Front; Defence of the Reich
- Awards: Knight's Cross of the Iron Cross

Konrad Bauer (9 February 1919 – 17 June 1990) was a Luftwaffe fighter pilot during World War II and a recipient of the Knight's Cross of the Iron Cross. Bauer claimed 57 aerial victories, 39 over the Western Front and 18 over the Eastern Front. Other sources list him with 68 aerial victories, of which 50 were claimed over the Western Allies.

Bauer claimed his first of 18 victories over the Eastern Front on 20 March 1943. In 1944 he was transferred to the Western Front where he claimed another 39 victories. He was awarded the Knight's Cross of the Iron Cross on 31 October 1944 after his 34th victory. After the war he joined the new Luftwaffe and retired as a Hauptmann in 1960.

== Early life and career ==
Bauer was born on 9 February 1919 in Gelsenkirchen in the Ruhrgebiet of the Weimar Republic. He joined the military service of the Luftwaffe in 1939. Following fighter pilot training at the air combat school in Fürstenfeldbruck, (Note: Flight training in the Luftwaffe progressed through the levels A1, A2 and B1, B2, referred to as A/B flight training. A training included theoretical and practical training in aerobatics, navigation, long-distance flights and dead-stick landings. The B courses included high-altitude flights, instrument flights, night landings, and training to handle the aircraft in difficult situations.) Bauer was posted to Jagdgeschwader 51 "Mölders" (JG 51—51st Fighter Wing) in March 1943 as an Unteroffizier (non-commissioned officer).

== World War II ==
On Friday 1 September 1939 German forces had invaded Poland which marked the beginning of World War II, and in June 1941, Germany had invaded the Soviet Union which created the Eastern Front. In March 1943 Bauer was assigned to 10. Staffel (10th squadron) of JG 51, a squadron of JG 51's IV. Gruppe (4th group). At the time, 10. Staffel was headed by Oberleutnant Horst-Günther von Fassong. The Gruppe, commanded by Major Rudolf Resch, was based at based at Smolensk and had just been equipped with the Focke-Wulf Fw 190 A-4. In support of Operation Büffel, a series of local retreats by Army Group Centre, Bauer claimed his first aerial victory on 20 March when he shot down a Petlyakov Pe-2 bomber.

In January 1944, Bauer flew with the Stabsstaffel (headquarters squadron) of JG 51 which was based at Bobruysk and headed by Hauptmann Diethelm von Eichel-Streiber. (Note: In early October 1942, II. Gruppe of JG 51 had been withdrawn from the Eastern Front and sent to Jesau, near present-day Bagrationovsk, to Heiligenbeil, present-day Mamonovo, to be reequipped with the Focke-Wulf Fw 190 A. While undergoing training on this aircraft, the Gruppe received orders on 4 November to transfer to the Mediterranean theatre flying the Messerschmitt Bf 109 again. 6. Staffel had been exempt from this order, was detached from II. Gruppe, and continued its training on the Fw 190. In late November, 6. Staffel was renamed to Stabsstaffel (headquarters squadron) of JG 51. Alternatively, the Stabsstaffel was also referred to as Geschwaderstabsstaffel z.b.V., roughly translating to fighter wing squadron for special deployment'. The abbreviation z. b. V. is German and stands for zur besonderen Verwendung (for special deployment).) Bauer claimed his first aerial victories with the Stabsstaffel on 10 January, flying fighter escort missions for Junkers Ju 87 dive bombers attacking Soviet positions in the area of Zhlobin. That day, Bauer was credited with the destruction of a Yakovlev Yak-7 fighter and an Ilyushin Il-2 ground-attack aircraft. Two days later Bauer was credited with his last aerial victories on the Eastern Front in the same combat area. He claimed three Pe-2 bombers destroyed but received credit for only two of them.

In anticipation of the Normandy landings, the liberation of German-occupied Western Europe, JG 51 received orders to transfer at least two experienced pilots from every squadron to the Western Front, among them Bauer. Bauer was transferred to 2. Staffel of Jagdgeschwader 3 "Udet" (JG 3—3rd Fighter Wing). Here, he claimed his first aerial victory on 18 April. That day, the United States Army Air Forces (USAAF) Eighth Air Force attacked Berlin. Defending against the attack, Bauer claimed a Boeing B-17 Flying Fortress bomber shot down.

=== Defense of the Reich ===
On 10 June 1944, Bauer was transferred to II. Sturmgruppe (2nd assault group) of Jagdgeschwader 300 "Wilde Sau" (JG 300—300th Fighter Wing) flying defense of the Reich missions. There, he was assigned to 5. Staffel. At the time, the Sturmgruppe was based at Merzhausen and moved to Frankfurt Airfield on 12 June. Three days later, the Sturmgruppe relocated to Unterschlauersbach, present-day part of Großhabersdorf. Here on 7 July, a force of 1,129 B-17s and B-24 Liberators of the USAAF Eighth Air Force set out from England to bomb aircraft factories in the Leipzig area and the synthetic oil plants at Boehlen, Leuna-Merseburg and Lützkendorf. This formation was intercepted by a German Gefechtsverband (combat formation) consisting of IV. Sturmgruppe of JG 3, led by Hauptmann Wilhelm Moritz, escorted by two Gruppen of Messerschmitt Bf 109s from JG 300 led by Major Walther Dahl. Dahl and Moritz drove the attack to point-blank range behind the Liberators of the 492d Bombardment Group before opening fire. 492d Bombardment Group was temporarily without fighter cover. Within about a minute the entire squadron of twelve B-24s had been annihilated. The Germans claimed 28 USAAF 2nd Air Division B-24s that day and were credited with at least 21. The majority to the Sturmgruppe attack. In this encounter, also known as the Luftschlacht bei Oschersleben (aerial battle at Oschersleben), Bauer claimed his first aerial victories with JG 300, two B-24 bombers shot down near Artern, and a few minutes later an escorting Lockheed P-38 Lightning fighter near Wernigerode. (Note: Authors Mathews and Foreman list Bauer with eight aerial victories claimed between 13 and 29 June 1944. Lorant and Goyat however state that these claims do not match a list compiled in September 1944. It is therefore possible that these eight claims are merely duplicated and incorrectly dated official claims.)

Combat box of a 12-plane B-17 squadron. Three such boxes completed a 36-plane group box.: 1. Lead Element; 2. High Element; 3. Low Element; 4. Low Low Element

On 10 July, Bauer was awarded the German Cross in Gold (Deutsches Kreuz in Gold). Two days later, II. Sturmgruppe moved from Unterschlauersbach to Holzkirchen. On 27 July, the USAAF Fifteenth Air Force sent 295 B-24 and 109 B-17 bombers on mission to bomb the armament factories located at Budapest. This formation was first intercepted by fighters at 09:25 over Lake Balaton from I. Gruppe of Jagdgeschwader 302 (JG 302—302nd Fighter Wing), II. Gruppe of Jagdgeschwader 27 (JG 27—27th Fighter Wing) and the Hungarian 101st Home Air Defence Fighter Group (101. Honi Légvédelmi Vadászrepülő Osztály). Twenty to thirty minutes later, Bretschneider led an attack of 15 Fw 190 fighters from II. Gruppe in an attack on a combat box formation of B-24 bombers in the area Pápa and Budapest. In this attack, Brettschneider claimed three B-24 bombers shot down but also had to bail out of Fw 190 was hit in the engine.

On 9 August, Bauer made a forced landing in his Fw 190 A at Griesheim Airfield following combat with B-17 bombers. In August, the Sturmgruppe moved to Erfurt–Bindersleben Airfield. On 15 August, the USAAF Eighth Air Force attacked various Luftwaffe airfields in Germany. That day, Bauer claimed a B-17 bomber shot down. On 11 September, the USAAF Eighth Air Force sent a force of 1,131 bombers against German oil refineries and synthetic-fuel factories. That day, Bauer claimed three escorting North American P-51 Mustang fighters shot down in aerial combat ranging from 7,000 to 50 meters (22,970 to 160 feet). In this encounter, Bauer's Fw 190 A-8 (Werknummer 681469—factory number) was also hit, resulting in a forced landing near Nordhausen. Bauer, who had two fingers shot off from his right hand, struggled to escape from his cockpit when his aircraft came under strafing attack from marauding P-51 fighters. Crouched up behind the armor plating, he survived the attack and was hospitalized at Nordhausen. Six weeks later, he rejoined his unit but did not fly regularly for the final months of the war. Bauer was awarded the Knight's Cross of the Iron Cross (Ritterkreuz des Eisernen Kreuzes) on 31 October for 34 aerial victories.

On 9 February 1945, the USAAF Eighth Air Force attacked German synthetic-fuel manufacturing and transportation infrastructure with a force of 1,296 bombers escorted by more than 800 fighter aircraft. II. Gruppe attacked a formation of B-24 bombers near Magdeburg. Avoiding the fighter escorts, the Gruppe claimed two B-24 bombers shot down east of Magdeburg, including one by Bauer, his first claim since the injuries sustained on 11 September 1944. On 22 February, II. Gruppe was placed under command of Oberleutnant Waldemar Radener. On 30 April, Bauer belonged to a group of ten soldiers hiding in a forest near Holzkirchen to avoid capture by advancing American forces. He had been nominated for the Knight's Cross of the Iron Cross with Oak Leaves (Ritterkreuz des Eisernen Kreuzes mit Eichenlaub) which was not approved before the war ended.

== Later life ==
Following World War II, Bauer served in the post-war Bundesluftwaffe, retiring in December 1960 holding the rank of Hauptmann (captain). He died on 26 October 1990 at the age of 71 in Gelsenkirchen, Germany.

== Summary of career ==
=== Aerial victory claims ===
According to US historian David T. Zabecki, Bauer was credited with 57 aerial victories. Obermaier also lists Bauer with 57 aerial victory claims, 39 over the Western Front, including 32 four-engine bombers, and 18 over the Eastern Front. Additionally, Page states that his 57 aerial victories were claimed in 416 combat missions. According to Weal, he was credited with 68 aerial victories. Spick also lists him with 68 aerial victories claimed in 416 combat missions. Mathews and Foreman, authors of Luftwaffe Aces — Biographies and Victory Claims, researched the German Federal Archives and found documentation for 38 aerial victory claims, plus further ten unconfirmed claims. The number of confirmed claims includes 16 on the Eastern Front and 22 on the Western Front, including 13 four-engine bombers.

Victory claims were logged to a map-reference (PQ = Planquadrat), for example "PQ 35 Ost 25281". The Luftwaffe grid map (Jägermeldenetz) covered all of Europe, western Russia and North Africa and was composed of rectangles measuring 15 minutes of latitude by 30 minutes of longitude, an area of about 360 square miles (930 km^{2}). These sectors were then subdivided into 36 smaller units to give a location area 3 km × 4 km (1.9 mi × 2.5 mi) in size.

Chronicle of aerial victories
This and the ♠ (Ace of spades) indicates those aerial victories which made Bauer an "ace-in-a-day", a term which designates a fighter pilot who has shot down five or more airplanes in a single day. This and the ? (question mark) indicates information discrepancies listed by Prien, Stemmer, Rodeike, Balke, Bock, Mathews and Foreman.
Claim	Date	Time	Type	Location	Claim	Date	Time	Type	Location
– 10. Staffel of Jagdgeschwader 51 "Mölders" – Eastern Front — March – August 1943
1	20 March 1943	15:25	Pe-2	PQ 35 Ost 25281	3? (Note: This claim is not listed by Mathews and Foreman.)	2 August 1943	08:42	Il-2 m.H. (Note: The "m.H." refers to an Ilyushin Il-2 with rear gunner (mit Heckschütze).)	PQ 35 Ost 53681
2	17 July 1943	08:11	Il-2 m.H.	PQ 35 Ost 63643 vicinity of Lukowets					
– Stabsstaffel of Jagdgeschwader 51 "Mölders" – Eastern Front — September – 31 December 1943
4	1 September 1943	18:12	La-5	PQ 35 Ost 25467; 20 km (12 mi) west-northwest of Yelnya	9♠	15 December 1943	10:06	Boston	PQ 25 Ost 93276; 10 km (6.2 mi) east of Parichi
5	2 September 1943	11:10	Il-2 m.H.	PQ 35 Ost 25496, west of Yelnya; 20 km (12 mi) west of Yelnya	10♠	15 December 1943	10:07	Boston	PQ 25 Ost 93425, southwest of Zhlobin; 20 km (12 mi) east-southeast of Parichi
6	5 September 1943	11:23	Il-2 m.H.	southwest of Yelnya; 10 km (6.2 mi) west of Yelnya	11♠	15 December 1943	10:09	Il-2 m.H.	PQ 25 Ost 93436; 20 km (12 mi) south of Zhlobin
7	29 November 1943	14:24	Pe-2	25 km (16 mi) east of Zhlobin	12♠	15 December 1943	10:09	Il-2 m.H.	PQ 35 Ost 03311; 20 km (12 mi) south-southwest of Zhlobin
8♠	15 December 1943	08:20	Il-2 m.H.	PQ 35 Ost 03176; 10 km (6.2 mi) south of Zhlobin	13♠	15 December 1943	10:10	Il-2 m.H.	PQ 25 Ost 93299, 15 km (9.3 mi) south of Zhlobin
– Stabsstaffel of Jagdgeschwader 51 "Mölders" – Eastern Front — January 1944
14	10 January 1944	11:15	Yak-7	PQ 25 Ost 93566; 20 km (12 mi) west-southwest of Talachyn	17	12 January 1944	12:06	Pe-2	PQ 25 Ost 93626; 40 km (25 mi) north-northeast of Mazyr
15	10 January 1944	11:17	Il-2	PQ 25 Ost 93617; 40 km (25 mi) south-southeast of Parichi	— ? (Note: This unconfirmed claim is not listed by Mathews and Foreman.)	12 January 1944	—	Pe-2	
16	12 January 1944	12:05	Pe-2	PQ 25 Ost 93627; 40 km (25 mi) southeast of Parichi					
– 2. Staffel of Jagdgeschwader 3 "Udet" – Defense of the Reich — April 1944
19	18 April 1944	14:50	B-17	PQ 15 Ost S/EG-4/3; Zehdenick	21?	24 May 1944	—	B-17	
20?	24 May 1944	—	B-17						
– 5. Staffel of Jagdgeschwader 300 "Wilde Sau" – Defense of the Reich — June – August 1944
— ? (Note: This unconfirmed claim is not listed by Lorant and Goyat.)	13 June 1944	—	B-24	vicinity of Munich	27	20 July 1944	11:06	B-17	Zwickau
— ?	13 June 1944	—	B-24	vicinity of Munich	28	25 July 1944	11:08	B-24	PQ 14 Ost N/CL; Grein forest, west of Krems an der Donau; Martinsburg/Spitz
— ?	20 June 1944	—	B-24		29	27 July 1944	10:00	B-24	PQ 14 Ost N/GR-7; Mór; Székesfehérvár
— ?	20 June 1944	—	B-24		30	27 July 1944	10:00	B-24	PQ 14 Ost N/GR; 15 km (9.3 mi) southwest of Mór; Székesfehérvár
— ?	26 June 1944	—	B-24		31	27 July 1944	10:01	B-24	PQ 14 Ost N/GR; Mór; Székesfehérvár
— ?	26 June 1944	—	B-24		32	9 August 1944	10:45	B-17	Herrenberg, southwest of Stuttgart; Wildberg
— ?	29 June 1944	—	B-17	vicinity of Naumburg	33	15 August 1944	11:45	B-17	Schwarzenborn, northeast of Bitburg vicinity of Kyllburg
— ?	29 June 1944	—	B-17		34	22 August 1944	10:05	B-24	PQ 14 Ost N/HP; Celldömölk-Sümeg/Herend; Nagykanizsa
22	7 July 1944	09:36	B-24	PQ 15 Ost S/LC; Artern	35	23 August 1944	12:18	P-51	PQ 14 Ost N/FL-5; Seeberg; Hochschwab
23	7 July 1944	09:37	B-24	PQ 15 Ost S/LC; Artern	36	23 August 1944	12:19	P-51	PQ 14 Ost N/FL-5; Seeberg; Hochschwab
24	7 July 1944	09:46	P-38	PQ 15 Ost S/JB; Wernigerode	37	29 August 1944	10:45	B-17	PQ 05 Ost S/UR; Púchov; Brno
— ?	16 July 1944	—	B-17	vicinity of Weilheim	38	11 September 1944	11:52	P-51	PQ 05 Ost S/MU, Lichtenau-Rotenburg
— ?	16 July 1944	—	B-17	vicinity of Weilheim	39	11 September 1944	11:53	P-51	PQ 05 Ost S/MU, Lichtenau-Rotenburg
25	19 July 1944	09:35	P-51	PQ 14 Ost N/EA-6; Obergünzburg	40	11 September 1944	11:58	P-51	PQ 05 Ost S/NT, Schwalmstadt-Ziegenhain
26	20 July 1944	11:05	B-17	Zwickau					
– 5. Staffel of Jagdgeschwader 300 "Wilde Sau" – Defense of the Reich — September 1944 – May 1945
41	9 February 1945	—	B-24	Magdeburg	42	2 April 1945	15:00–15:15	P-51	west of Halle

=== Awards ===
- Iron Cross (1939) 2nd and 1st Class
- Honor Goblet of the Luftwaffe on 8 May 1944 as Feldwebel and pilot (Note: According to Obermaier on 31 March 1944.)
- German Cross in Gold on 10 July 1944 as Feldwebel in the 5./Jagdgeschwader 300
- Knight's Cross of the Iron Cross on 31 October 1944 as Feldwebel and pilot in the 5./Jagdgeschwader 300
