= Waldemar Radener =

German fighter ace and Knight's Cross recipient (1921–1957)

- Born: 24 January 1921; Lüchtringen, Germany
- Died: 8 January 1957 (aged 35); Schongau, West Germany
- Spouse: Helga Radener-Blaschke
- Military career
- Allegiance: Nazi Germany (to 1945); West Germany
- Branch: Luftwaffe (Wehrmacht); German Air Force (Bundeswehr)
- Service years: 1939–1945; 1956–1957
- Rank: Oberleutnant (Wehrmacht); Hauptmann (Bundeswehr)
- Units: JG 26; JG 300
- Commands: II./JG 26; II./JG 300
- Conflicts: See battles World War II: Western Front; Defense of the Reich; Operation Jericho; Operation Overlord; Operation Bodenplatte
- Awards: Knight's Cross of the Iron Cross
- Other work: fashion industry

Waldemar Radener (Note: According to Scherzer later named Waldemar Radener-Blaschke.) (24 January 1921 – 8 January 1957) was a German Luftwaffe military aviator and fighter ace during World War II. He is credited with 37 aerial victories, all of which claimed over the Western Front and in Defense of the Reich.

Born in Lüchtringen, Radener grew up in the Weimar Republic and Nazi Germany. He joined the military service in the Luftwaffe and was trained as a fighter pilot. Following flight training, (Note: Flight training in the Luftwaffe progressed through the levels A1, A2 and B1, B2, referred to as A/B flight training. A training included theoretical and practical training in aerobatics, navigation, long-distance flights and dead-stick landings. The B courses included high-altitude flights, instrument flights, night landings and training to handle the aircraft in difficult situations.) he was posted to Jagdgeschwader 26 "Schlageter" (JG 26—26th Fighter Wing) in February 1943. Flying with this wing, Radener claimed his first aerial victory on 13 March 1943 on the Western Front over a Royal Air Force fighter aircraft which was not confirmed. After he had temporarily led 6. Staffel (6th squadron) of JG 26 in late 1943, he was officially appointed squadron leader of 7. Staffel (7th squadron) of JG 26 in February 1944. In late January 1945, Radener was given command of II. Gruppe (2nd group) of JG 26. In late February 1945, he transferred to Jagdgeschwader 300 (JG 300—300th Fighter Wing) where he commanded II. Gruppe of JG 300. On 12 March, he was awarded the Knight's Cross of the Iron Cross for his service with JG 26. After World War II, he joined the German Air Force and was killed in a flying accident 8 January 1957.

== Early life ==
Radener was born on 24 January 1921 at Lüchtrigen, present-day part of Höxter, at the time in the Province of Westphalia, a Free State of Prussia in the Weimar Republic.

== World War II ==
World War II in Europe began on Friday 1 September 1939 when German forces invaded Poland. Following flight training, Leutnant Radener joined 4. Staffel of Jagdgeschwader 26 "Schlageter" (JG 26—26th Fighter Wing) on 28 February 1943. Equipped with the Focke-Wulf Fw 190 A-4, his squadron was part of II. Gruppe (2nd group) of JG 26 and at the time under the command of Major Wilhelm-Ferdinand Galland and based at Vitry-En-Artois Airfield in northern France. Radener filed his first aerial victory claim on 13 March which was not confirmed. The Supermarine Spitfire fighter came from either the Royal Canadian Air Force (RCAF) No. 402 or No. 403 Squadron and claimed shot down east of Étaples. His first confirmed aerial victory came on 3 May. That day, he shot down a Royal Air Force (RAF) Spitfire 20 kilometres (12 miles) west of the Baie de Somme.

Combat box of a 12-plane B-17 squadron. Three such boxes completed a 36-plane group box.: 1. Lead Element; 2. High Element; 3. Low Element; 4. Low Low Element

On 14 May, Radener claimed a Herausschuss (separation shot) over a United States Army Air Forces (USAAF) Boeing B-17 Flying Fortress bomber from the 351st Bombardment Group northwest of Antwerp. A Herausschuss was a severely damaged heavy bomber forced to separate from his combat box which normally was counted as an aerial victory. In this instance, Radener was not credited with an aerial victory. The USAAF VIII Bomber Command flew its first daylight mission during the Battle of the Ruhr on 22 June. In defense of this attack, Radener claimed a Republic P-47 Thunderbolt escort fighter shot down 10–15 km (6.2–9.3 mi) northwest of Domburg. Four days later, the VIII Bomber Command attacked the Villacoublay Airfield. Defending against this attack, Radener shot down a P-47 from the 56th Fighter Group 10 km (6.2 mi) north-northwest of Le Tréport. VIII Bomber Command dispatched 237 B-17 on 4 July, attacking various targets in France, including the aircraft factories at Nantes and Le Mans, as well as the U-boat pen at La Pallice. This attack force was escorted by RAF Spitfire fighters of which Radener claimed one shot down. This claim however was not confirmed. On 30 July he claimed two USAAF P-47 fighters from the 78th Fighter Group and 56th Fighter Group near Arnhem and south of Werkendam.

=== Squadron leader and group commander ===
On 17 August 1943, during the Schweinfurt-Regensburg mission, the Gruppenkommandeur (group commander) Galland, was killed in action. In consequence, Hauptmann Johannes Naumann was temporarily given command of II. Gruppe. Naumann had led 6. Staffel until then and Radener was chosen as his successor as Staffelkapitän (squadron leader) of the Staffel. On 9 September, Oberstleutnant Johannes Seifert was officially appointed Gruppenkommandeur of II. Gruppe and Naumann returned to lead his 6. Staffel. On 27 August, Radener may have shot down Commandant René Mouchotte, commander of the Free French squadron in the RAF No. 341 (G.C.III/2 'Alsace') Squadron. Following the integration on 10. Staffel into JG 26 on 1 October, 6. Staffel was re-designated to 7. Staffel. The USAAF VIII Bomber Command targeted Ludwigshafen on 30 December. That day, Radener claimed his fifth heavy bomber destroyed.

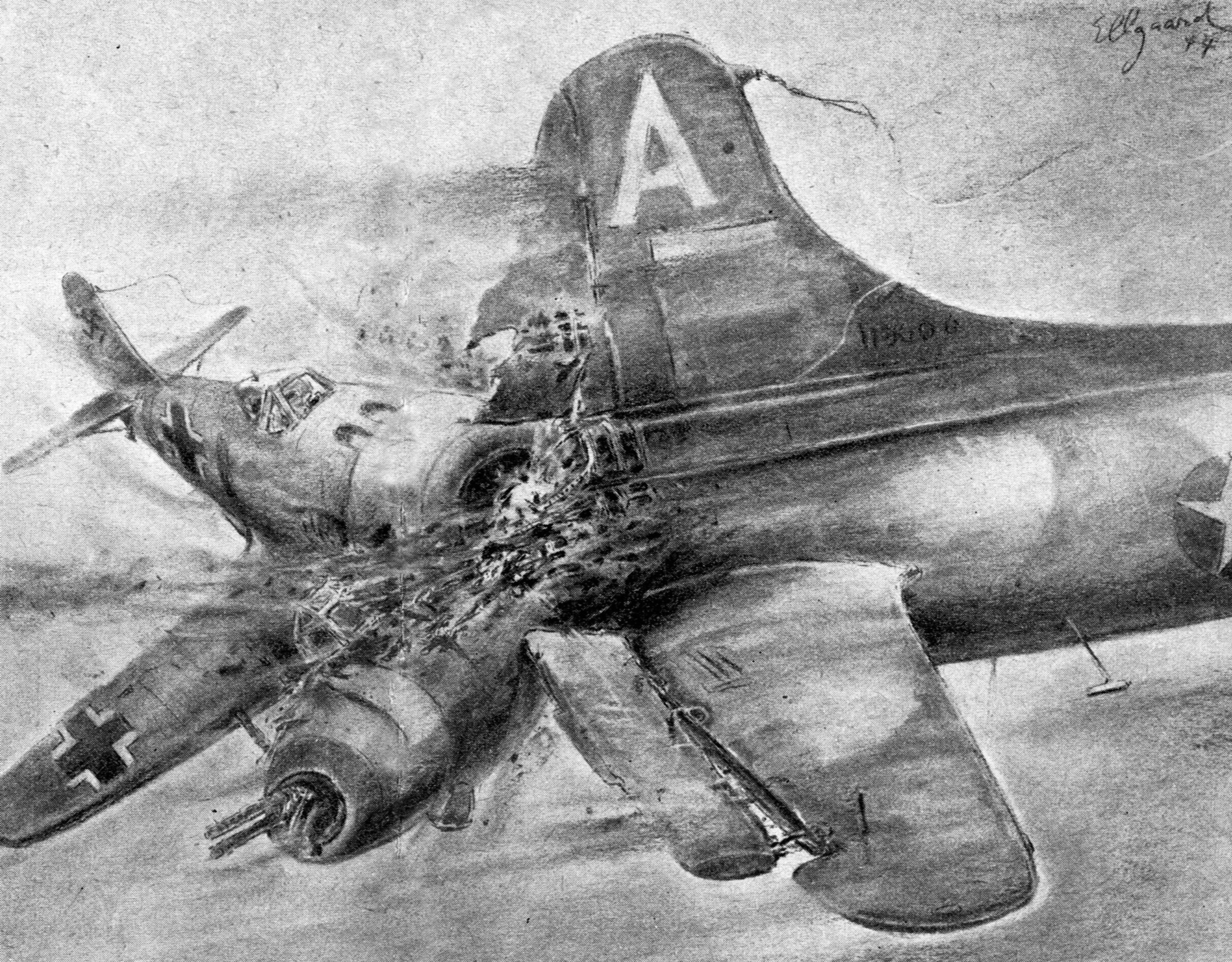
A 1944 drawing by Helmuth Ellgaard illustrating "ramming"

Radener shot down a P-47 fighter from the 353rd Fighter Group on 11 January 1944. This was his 10th aerial victory claim and the combat took place at Backum, near Lingen. On 9 February, Radener officially became the Staffelkapitän of 7. Staffel when Naumann was transferred again. On 18 February 1944, the RAF flew a low-level bombing raid on the Amiens Prison in German-occupied France dubbed Operation Jericho. The objective of the raid was to free French Resistance and political prisoners. The attack force of nineteen de Havilland Mosquito bombers was escorted by eight Hawker Typhoon fighters from No. 174 Squadron. At 11:35, Luftwaffe fighters were scrambled from Grévillers. Defending against this attack, Radener was credited with the destruction of a Typhoon, shot down north Amiens. His opponent was Flying Officer J. E. Renaud who made a forced landing and was taken prisoner of war.

On 16 April, Radener was awarded the German Cross in Gold (Deutsches Kreuz in Gold) for 16 aerial victories. On 11 May, he downed a Consolidated B-24 Liberator bomber from the 487th Bombardment Group but then accidentally rammed a second B-24 in his Focke-Wulf Fw 190 A-8 (Werknummer 680120—factory number). He bailed out with minor injuries while the B-24 returned to England. On 15 June, Radener claimed an unconfirmed aerial victory over a USAAF North American P-51 Mustang fighter from the 339th Fighter Group in combat east of Bonneval. Shortly after, he was also shot down by another P-51 from the 339th Fighter Group. He bailed out but his parachute failed to fully deploy after it got entangled with his Fw 190 A-8 (Werknummer 730934) and suffered injuries on landing keeping him hospitalised until the end of the month. During his convalescence, he was temporarily replaced by Leutnant Heinz-Gerhard Vogt as leader of 7. Staffel.

On 11 September, Radener returned from his injury leave and retained his command of 7. Staffel of JG 26. He claimed his last two aerial victories on 23 December, taking his total to 23 aerial victories. That day, the RAF Bomber Command attacked German transportation infrastructure east of combat area of the Battle of the Bulge which was fought in the Ardennes. In defense of this attack, Vogt shot down two Avro Lancaster bombers from the RCAF No. 405 Squadron or the RAF No. 582 Squadron in aerial combat west of Cologne.

Radener led his 7. Staffel during Operation Bodenplatte on 1 January 1945, an attempt at gaining air superiority during the stagnant stage of the Battle of the Bulge. II. Gruppe, under the leadership of Major Anton Hackl was based at Nordhorn at attacked the Evere Airfield at Brussels. Together with III. Gruppe, which was led by Hauptmann Walter Krupinski, the attack on Evere was the only successful mission. II. Gruppe lost 13 Fw 190s destroyed and two damaged. Nine of its pilots were missing; five were killed and four captured. While III. Gruppe lost six Bf 109s and four pilots, one of them was captured, the others were killed. Allied losses are given at Evere as 32 fighters, 22 twin-engine aircraft and 13 four-engine aircraft destroyed, plus another nine single-, six twin- and one four-engine aircraft damaged.

On 29 January 1945, Hackl was appointed Geschwaderkommodore (wing commander) of Jagdgeschwader 300 (JG 300—300th Fighter Wing). In consequence, Radener was handed command of II. Gruppe of JG 26 while command of 7. Staffel passed on to Leutnant Gottfried Dietze. On 22 February 1945, Radener was transferred to take command II. Gruppe of JG 300 on request by Hackl. Radener was awarded the Knight's Cross of the Iron Cross (Ritterkreuz des Eisernen Kreuzes) on 12 March 1945 for his service in JG 26.

== Later life and death ==
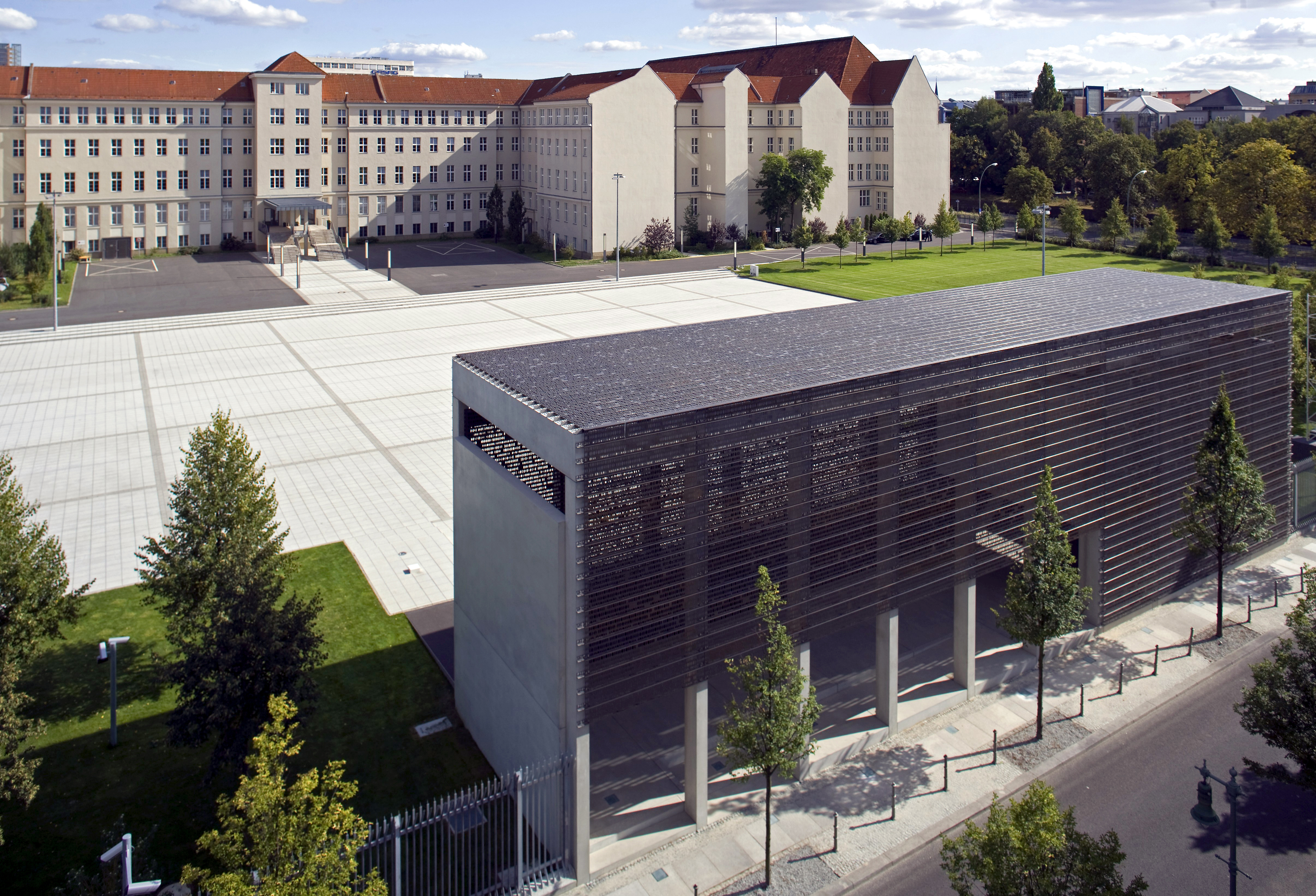
Bundeswehr Memorial, the Federal Ministry of Defence in the back

Following World War II, Radener joined the post-war Bundesluftwaffe. Hauptmann Radener was killed in a flying accident flying a Canadian Car and Foundry manufactured variant of the North American T-6 Texan "AA+637" on 8 January 1957 near Peißenberg. He is listed on the Ehrenmal der Bundeswehr (Bundeswehr Memorial). Radener was practicing a spin during a refresher course. He was the first Bundesluftwaffe pilot to die in a flying accident. Prior to joining the Bundesluftwaffe, Radener had worked in the fashion industry. He was married to Helga Radener-Blaschke, a German artist. Günther Rall delivered the eulogy at his funeral.

== Summary of career ==
=== Aerial victory claims ===
According to Obermaier, Radener was credited with 37 aerial victories all which claimed over the Western Front, including 17 heavy bombers. Mathews and Foreman, authors of Luftwaffe Aces — Biographies and Victory Claims, researched the German Federal Archives and found records for 23 aerial victories, plus 15 further unconfirmed claims. All of his aerial victories were claimed over the Western Allies and includes twelve four-engined bombers.

Chronicle of aerial victories
This and the – (dash) indicates unwitnessed aerial victory claims for which Radener did not receive credit. This along with the * (asterisk) indicates an Herausschuss (separation shot)—a severely damaged heavy bomber forced to separate from his combat box which was counted as an aerial victory. This along with the & (ampersand) indicates a endgültige Vernichtung (final destruction)—a coup de grâce inflicted on an already damaged heavy bomber. This and the ? (question mark) indicates information discrepancies listed by Caldwell, Prien, Stemmer, Rodeike, Bock, Mathews and Foreman.
Claim	Date	Time	Type	Location	Claim	Date	Time	Type	Location
– 4. Staffel of Jagdgeschwader 26 "Schlageter" – On the Western Front — 28 February – July 1943
—	13 March 1943	15:10? (Note: According to Mathews and Foreman claimed at 15:33.)	Spitfire	south of Belleville east of Étaples	2	22 June 1943	09:34	P-47	10–15 km (6.2–9.3 mi) northwest of Domburg
1	3 May 1943	06:50	Spitfire	20 km (12 mi) west of the Baie de Somme; 35 km (22 mi) west of Berck-sur-Mer	3	26 June 1943	19:04	P-47	10 km (6.2 mi) north-northwest of Le Tréport
—	14 May 1943	12:43? (Note: According to Caldwell claimed at 13:00.)	B-17*	Ostend northwest of Antwerp	—	4 July 1943	17:38? (Note: According to Caldwell claimed at 17:40.)	Spitfire	north of Amiens; Berck-sur-Mer
– 6. Staffel of Jagdgeschwader 26 "Schlageter" – On the Western Front — July – 30 September 1943
—	26 July 1943	11:45? (Note: According to Caldwell claimed at 11:25.)	Spitfire	Dunkirk-Ostend; 15 km (9.3 mi) southeast of Lille	—	27 August 1943	19:40	Spitfire	northwest of Dunkirk
4	30 July 1943	10:20	P-47	west of Arnhem	6	3 September 1943	09:58	P-47	3 km (1.9 mi) north of Guyancourt
5	30 July 1943	10:28	P-47	3 km (1.9 mi) south of Werkendam	—	6 September 1943	12:10	B-17*	south of Reims
– 7. Staffel of Jagdgeschwader 26 "Schlageter" – On the Western Front — 1 October – 31 December 1943
—	10 October 1943	15:35	B-17*	northeast of Münster	7	30 December 1943	14:00	P-47	12 km (7.5 mi) southeast of Beauvais
—	14 October 1943	13:35	B-17*	north of Koblenz	8	30 December 1943	14:36	B-17*	32 km (20 mi) west-northwest of Arras
– 7. Staffel of Jagdgeschwader 26 "Schlageter" – On the Western Front and in Defense of the Reich — 1 January – 31 December 1944
9	5 January 1944	13:14	B-17	vicinity of Miraumont	14	25 February 1944	14:45	B-24*	Nothweiler-west of Bad Bergzabern
10	11 January 1944	13:15	P-47	Backum, near Lingen	15	25 February 1944	15:20? (Note: According to Mathews and Foreman claimed at 15:22.)	B-17&	Wilgartswiesen-Pirmasens
—	29 January 1944	11:25? (Note: According to Mathews and Foreman claimed at 12:00.)	B-24*	north of Trier	16	12 April 1944	13:10	B-24*	18 km (11 mi) north of Namur
11	4 February 1944	12:00	B-24	10 km (6.2 mi) southeast of Albert	17	24 April 1944	12:22	B-17*	northeast of Saint-Dizier
—	8 February 1944	11:10	P-47	north of Laon	18	27 April 1944	17:42	P-47	southwest of Reims
—	8 February 1944	11:12	P-47	north of Laon	19	29 April 1944	13:35	B-17*	5 km (3.1 mi) southeast of Roubaix
—	11 February 1944	13:50	P-38	southeast of Valenciennes	20	8 May 1944	10:32	P-47	6 km (3.7 mi) north of Soissons
12	18 February 1944	12:05? (Note: According to Mathews and Foreman claimed at 12:10.)	Typhoon	north of Amiens	21	11 May 1944	14:00	B-24	44 km (27 mi) west of Chartres; Bazoches
—	24 February 1944	12:25	B-17*	northwest of Ascheberg	—	15 June 1944	—	P-51	east of Bonneval
13	24 February 1944	14:00	B-24	Aßlar, 5 km (3.1 mi) northwest of Wetzlar	22	23 December 1944	12:57	Lancaster	west of Cologne
—	24 February 1944	14:20	P-51	northwest of Wetzlar-southeast of Bonn	23	23 December 1944	13:01	Lancaster	northwest of Cologne-north-northwest of Düren

=== Awards ===
- Iron Cross (1939) 2nd and 1st Class
- German Cross in Gold on 16 April 1944 as Leutnant in the 7./Jagdgeschwader 26
- Knight's Cross of the Iron Cross on 12 March 1945 as Oberleutnant and Gruppenkommandeur of the II./Jagdgeschwader 26 "Schlageter"

== Notes ==
Military offices
Preceded by Major Anton Hackl	Gruppenkommandeur of II./JG 26; 30 January 1945 – 22 February 1945	Succeeded by Hauptmann Paul Schauder
Preceded by Major Alfred Lindenberger	Gruppenkommandeur of II./JG 300; 23 February 1945 – 16 April 1945	Succeeded by Hauptmann Karl-Heinz Dietsche
