= Ernst-Erich Hirschfeld =

German Luftwaffe pilot (1918–1944)

- Born: 25 August 1918; Breslau, Kingdom of Prussia, German Empire
- Died: 28 July 1944 (aged 25); Erfurt, Nazi Germany
- Military career
- Allegiance: Nazi Germany
- Branch: Luftwaffe
- Service years: ?-1944
- Rank: Oberleutnant
- Units: JG 54; JG 300
- Conflicts: World War II: Defense of the Reich
- Awards: Knight's Cross of the Iron Cross

Ernst-Erich Hirschfeld (25 August 1918 – 28 July 1944) was a German Luftwaffe fighter pilot during World War II and a recipient of the Knight's Cross of the Iron Cross during World War II of Nazi Germany. During his career he was credited with 24 aerial victories, 23 on the Western Front and 1 on the Eastern Front.

On 28 July 1944, Hirschfeld was killed in action after his parachute failed to open after he bailed out from his damaged Focke-Wulf Fw 190 A-8 (Werknummer 171459—factory number) between Gehren and Erfurt. Hirschfeld, who had commanded the 5. Staffel of Jagdgeschwader 300 (JG 300—300th Fighter Wing), was succeeded by Oberleutnant Hans-Joachim Weber. He was posthumously awarded the Knight's Cross on 24 October 1944.

== Summary of career ==
=== Aerial victory claims ===
Mathews and Foreman, authors of Luftwaffe Aces — Biographies and Victory Claims, researched the German Federal Archives and found records for 18 aerial victories, plus seven further unconfirmed claims. This figure of confirmed aerial victories includes one claim on the Eastern Front and 17 claims on the Western Front, including more than nine four-engined bombers.

Chronicle of aerial victories
This and the – (dash) indicates unconfirmed aerial victory claims for which Hirschfeld did not receive credit. This along with the & (ampersand) indicates a endgültige Vernichtung (final destruction)—a coup de grâce inflicted on an already damaged heavy bomber. This and the ? (question mark) indicates information discrepancies listed by Prien, Stemmer, Rodeike, Bock, Mathews and Foreman.
Claim	Date	Time	Type	Location	Claim	Date	Time	Type	Location
– 2. Staffel of Jagdgeschwader 54 – Eastern Front — 27 March – July 1943
1	26 May 1943	19:34	La-5	PQ 36 Ost 20231					
– 5. Staffel of Jagdgeschwader 300 – Western Front — July 1943 – June 1943
2? (Note: According to Mathews and Foreman, this claim was unconfirmed.)	24 August 1943	—	four-engine bomber		10	20 February 1944	04:20	Lancaster	Leipzig
3	22 September 1943	22:55	Stirling	Hannover	11	21 February 1944	14:45	B-24	vicinity of Achmer
4? (Note: This claim is not listed by Mathews and Foreman.)	22 September 1943	23:15	Lancaster	south of Vechta	12	8 March 1944	15:42	P-38	north of Twente
? (Note: This claim is not listed by Lorant and Goyat.)	27 September 1943	23:04	Lancaster	Hannover	13?	13 June 1944	—	B-24	Weilheim
5	27 September 1943	23:15	Stirling	west of Hannover	14?	13 June 1944	—	B-24	Weilheim
6	3 October 1943	22:27	Stirling	south of Kassel	15	21 June 1944	10:18	B-24	Berlin-Lichtenberg
7?	18 November 1943	—	four-engine bomber	vicinity of Mannheim	16	21 June 1944	10:20	B-17	Berlin-Lichtenberg
8?	18 November 1943	—	four-engine bomber	vicinity of Mannheim	— ?	21 June 1944	10:24	B-24&	south of Berlin
9?	29 January 1944	—	four-engine bomber						
– 6. Staffel of Jagdgeschwader 300 – Western Front — June – 28 July 1944
17	26 June 1944	09:40	B-24	southwest of Tulln	21	19 July 1944	09:35	P-51	Kempten-Sonthofen; Immenstadt
18?	26 June 1944	—	B-24	east of Stockerau	22	25 July 1944	10:58	B-24	vicinity of Ostmark
19	7 July 1944	09:38	B-24	vicinity of Magdeburg	23	26 July 1944	11:10	P-51	Austria
20	16 July 1944	09:48	B-17	northwest of Munich	24	26 July 1944	11:20	B-17	Austria

=== Awards ===
- Honour Goblet of the Luftwaffe (Ehrenpokal der Luftwaffe) on 15 April 1944 as Leutnant and pilot
- German Cross in Gold on 10 September 1944 as Oberleutnant in the 6./Jagdgeschwader 300
- Knight's Cross of the Iron Cross on 24 October 1944 as Oberleutnant and pilot in the 5./Jagdgeschwader 300. (Note: According to Scherzer as pilot in the 6./Jagdgeschwader 300.)
