= Hermann Wischnewski =

German night fighter ace and Knight's Cross recipient

- Born: 9 February 1917; Rensefeld
- Died: 28 November 1993 (aged 76); Lübeck
- Military career
- Allegiance: Nazi Germany
- Branch: Luftwaffe
- Service years: 1940–1945
- Rank: Oberfähnrich (officer candidate)
- Unit: JG 300
- Conflicts: World War II: Eastern Front; Defense of the Reich
- Awards: Knight's Cross of the Iron Cross

Hermann Wischnewski (9 February 1917 – 28 November 1993) was a Luftwaffe ace and recipient of the Knight's Cross of the Iron Cross during World War II. The Knight's Cross of the Iron Cross, and its variants were the highest awards in the military and paramilitary forces of Nazi Germany during World War II. During his career Hermann Wischniewski was credited with between 24 and 28 victories.

== Career ==
Wischnewski was born on 9 February 1917 in Rensefeld, present-day part of Bad Schwartau, in the Province of Schleswig-Holstein within the German Empire. He joined the Luftwaffe in early 1940 and following flight training, (Note: Flight training in the Luftwaffe progressed through the levels A1, A2 and B1, B2, referred to as A/B flight training. A training included theoretical and practical training in aerobatics, navigation, long-distance flights and dead-stick landings. The B courses included high-altitude flights, instrument flights, night landings and training to handle the aircraft in difficult situations.) he was posted to Kampfgruppe z.b.V. 700 flying the Junkers Ju 52 transport aircraft. On 29 July 1944, Wischnewski was shot down and wounded in aerial combat with North American P-51 Mustang fighters. He bailed out of his Messerschmitt Bf 109 G-6/U2 near Apolda.

== Later life ==
Wischnewski died on 28 November 1993 at the age of 76 in Lübeck, Germany.

== Summary of career ==
=== Aerial victory claims ===
According to Spick, Wischnewski was credited with 28 aerial victories, 18 of which by night, claimed in over 500 missions. Aders lists him with 16 nocturnal aerial victories and two daytime claims. Mathews and Foreman, authors of Luftwaffe Aces — Biographies and Victory Claims, researched the German Federal Archives and state that he was credited with at least eight aerial victory, plus sixteen further unconfirmed claims. This figure of confirmed claims includes at least four four-engine heavy bombers, all on the Western Front.

Victory claims were logged to a map-reference (PQ = Planquadrat), for example "PQ 15 Ost S/GG-9". The Luftwaffe grid map (Jägermeldenetz) covered all of Europe, western Russia and North Africa and was composed of rectangles measuring 15 minutes of latitude by 30 minutes of longitude, an area of about 360 square miles (930 km^{2}). These sectors were then subdivided into 36 smaller units to give a location area 3 km × 4 km (1.9 mi × 2.5 mi) in size.

Chronicle of aerial victories
This and the – (dash) indicates unconfirmed aerial victory claims for which Wischnewski did not receive credit. This along with the * (asterisk) indicates an Herausschuss (separation shot)—a severely damaged heavy bomber forced to separate from his combat box which was counted as an aerial victory. This and the ? (question mark) indicates information discrepancies listed by Lorant, Goyat, Mathews, Foreman and Parry.
Claim	Date	Time	Type	Location	Serial No./Squadron No.
– 3. Staffel of Kommando Herrmann –
—	25/26 July 1943	—	four-engined bomber		
1	31 July 1943	01:40	B-17? (Note: According to Foreman, Mathews and Parry claimed as a Short Stirling.)	west of Remscheid	
– 3. Staffel of Jagdgeschwader 300 –
2	22 September 1943	22:37	Halifax	Hanover	Halifax HR924/No. 10 Squadron RAF
– 1. Staffel of Jagdgeschwader 300 –
—	18 November 1943	—	four-engined bomber	vicinity of Mannheim	
—	18 November 1943	—	four-engined bomber	vicinity of Mannheim	
—	29 December 1943	—	four-engined bomber		
3	1/2 January 1944	—	Lancaster		
4	2/3 January 1944	—	Lancaster		
5	2/3 January 1944	—	Lancaster		
6	28/29 January 1944	—	four-engined bomber? (Note: According to Foreman, Mathews and Parry claimed as a Handley Page Halifax.)		
7	28/29 January 1944	—	four-engined bomber?		
8	24/25 March 1944	—	four-engined bomber		
9	24/25 March 1944	—	four-engined bomber		
	23 April 1944	01:22	Halifax	5–8 km (3.1–5.0 mi) north of Düsseldorf	
	23 May 1944	00:53	four-engined bomber	Dortmund	Lancaster DS848/No. 408 Squadron RCAF
– 2. Staffel of Jagdgeschwader 300 – Defense of the Reich — 15 March – 29 July 1944
	21 June 1944	10:03	B-24*	PQ 15 Ost S/GG-9, Rangsdorf	
	29 June 1944	09:00	P-51	PQ 15 OS/S/KE, Bitterfeld	
—	21 July 1944	—	B-24		
—	21 July 1944	—	P-51	Friedrichshafen	
	29 July 1944	10:48	B-17	PQ 15 Ost S/MC-6; Buttstädt	
	29 July 1944	10:55	B-17	PQ 15 Ost S/MD-7; Apolda	

=== Awards ===
- Iron Cross (1939) 2nd and 1st Class
- Honor Goblet of the Luftwaffe on 5 June 1943 as Feldwebel and pilot (Note: According to Obermaier on 26 May 1943.)
- German Cross in Gold on 17 October 1943 as Feldwebel in the III./Transportgeschwader 2 (Note: According to Obermaier on 10 January 1944.)
- Knight's Cross of the Iron Cross on 16 December 1944 as Fahnenjunker-Oberfeldwebel and pilot in the 2./Jagdgeschwader 300
