= Herbert Schob =

- Born: 12 May 1915; Leipzig
- Died: 5 April 1981 (aged 65); Frankfurt
- Military career
- Allegiance: Nazi Germany
- Branch: Army; Luftwaffe
- Service years: 1934–45
- Rank: Hauptmann
- Units: Condor Legion; LG 1 ZG 76; JG 300
- Conflicts: Spanish Civil War World War II
- Awards: Knight's Cross of the Iron Cross

Herbert Schob (12 May 1915 – 5 April 1981) was a Luftwaffe ace and recipient of the Knight's Cross of the Iron Cross during World War II. The Knight's Cross of the Iron Cross, and its variants were the highest awards in the military and paramilitary forces of Nazi Germany during World War II. During his career Herbert Schob was credited with 34 aerial victories, 6 in the Spanish Civil War and 28 during World War II.

== Awards ==
- Spanish Cross in Gold with Swords
- Iron Cross (1939) 2nd Class & 1st Class
- German Cross in Gold on 14 April 1942 as Oberfeldwebel in the 2./Nachtjagdgeschwader 4
- Knight's Cross of the Iron Cross on 9 June 1944 as Oberleutnant and pilot in the II./Zerstörergeschwader 76 (Note: According to Scherzer as Oberleutnant and Staffelkapitän of the I./Zerstörergeschwader 76.)
