= Rudi Zwesken =

German fighter pilot during World War II (1919–1946)

- Born: 13 August 1919; Marschendorf, Sudetenland
- Died: 22 February 1946 (aged 26); Bitterfeld, Germany
- Military career
- Allegiance: Nazi Germany
- Branch: Luftwaffe
- Service years: 1941–1945
- Rank: Oberfeldwebel
- Units: JG 52, JG 300
- Conflicts: World War II: Eastern Front; Defense of the Reich
- Awards: Knight's Cross of the Iron Cross

Rudolf Zwesken (13 August 1919 – 22 February 1946) was a German Luftwaffe ace and recipient of the Knight's Cross of the Iron Cross during World War II. The Knight's Cross of the Iron Cross, and its variants were the highest awards in the military and paramilitary forces of Nazi Germany during World War II. During his career Zwesken was credited with 30 victories on Eastern Front and roughly 15 victories in Defense of the Reich, mostly four-engined bombers.

== Controversy over death ==
Zwesken committed suicide following the death of his fiancée and child she was carrying. In alternative account by Dixon based on rumor, Zwesken, after he was released from captivity, went to bar full of American and British soldiers. When Zweskens was identified as a German, a fight broke out and Zwesken was shot. To avoid a scandal, the cause of death was reported as suicide.

== Summary of career ==
=== Aerial victory claims ===
According to US historian David T. Zabecki, Zwesken was credited with 52 aerial victories. Obermaier lists him with 40 aerial victories. Mathews and Foreman, authors of Luftwaffe Aces — Biographies and Victory Claims, researched the German Federal Archives and state that he was credited with more than 23 aerial victory claims, including at least 14 four-engine bombers, all of which claimed over the Western Allies.

Victory claims were logged to a map-reference (PQ = Planquadrat), for example "PQ 14 Ost N/ED-3". The Luftwaffe grid map (Jägermeldenetz) covered all of Europe, western Russia and North Africa and was composed of rectangles measuring 15 minutes of latitude by 30 minutes of longitude, an area of about 360 square miles (930 km^{2}). These sectors were then subdivided into 36 smaller units to give a location area 3 km × 4 km (1.9 mi × 2.5 mi) in size.

Chronicle of aerial victories
This and the – (dash) indicates unconfirmed aerial victory claims for which Zwesken did not receive credit. This and the ? (question mark) indicates information discrepancies listed by Lorant, Goyat, Prien, Stemmer, Rodeike, Balke, Bock, Mathews and Foreman.
| Claim | Date | Time | Type | Location | Claim | Date | Time | Type | Location |
– 5. Staffel of Jagdgeschwader 300 "Wilde Sau" – Defense of the Reich — June – July 1944
| 1 | 21 June 1944 | 10:27 | B-17 | Oranienburg | 2 | 7 July 1944 | 09:40 | B-24 | Magdeburg |
– 6. Staffel of Jagdgeschwader 300 "Wilde Sau" – Defense of the Reich — July – 31 December 1944
| 3 | 19 July 1944 | 11:35 | P-38 | PQ 14 Ost N/ED-3, 15 km (9.3 mi) northwest of Bad Aibling | 10 | 12 September 1944 | 11:31 | B-17 | PQ 15 Ost S/EH-5, Finow |
| 4 | 22 August 1944 | 10:04 | P-38 | PQ 14 Ost N/HP-HQ | — | 13 September 1944 | — | P-51 | west of Eisenach |
| 5 | 22 August 1944 | 10:05 | P-38 | PQ 14 Ost N/HQ | 11 | 17 December 1944 | 11:53 | B-24 | PQ 15 Ost S/TP, Prerau |
| 6 | 22 August 1944 | 10:09 | P-38 | PQ 14 Ost N/GR-8 | 12 | 17 December 1944 | 11:56 | B-24 | PQ 15 Ost S/RP-8, 5 km (3.1 mi) north of Sternberg |
| 7 | 22 August 1944 | 13:25 | B-24 | PQ 14 Ost N/LP-5 | 13 | 24 December 1944 | 14:58 | P-51 | PQ 05 Ost S/NT/NU, Schwalmstadt-Ziegenhain/Bad Hersfeld |
| 8 | 22 August 1944 | 12:45 | B-24 | Neuhaus/Protectorate | 14 | 31 December 1944 | 12:12? (Note: According to Lorant and Goyat claimed at 12:05.) | B-17 | Rotenburg an der Wümme |
| 9 | 29 August 1944 | 11:02 | B-17 | PQ 05 Ost S/UR | 15 | 31 December 1944 | 12:13 | B-17 | Rotenburg an der Wümme |

=== Awards ===
- Ehrenpokal der Luftwaffe
- Front Flying Clasp of the Luftwaffe
- Eastern Front Medal
- West Wall Medal
- Pilot/Observer Badge
- Iron Cross (1939)
  - 2nd Class
  - 1st Class (22 July 1944)
- German Cross in Gold in 1945 as Oberfeldwebel in the 1./Jagdgeschwader 52
- Knight's Cross of the Iron Cross on 21 March 1945 as Oberfeldwebel and pilot in the 6./Jagdgeschwader 300
