= List of aerial victories claimed by Friedrich Geisshardt =

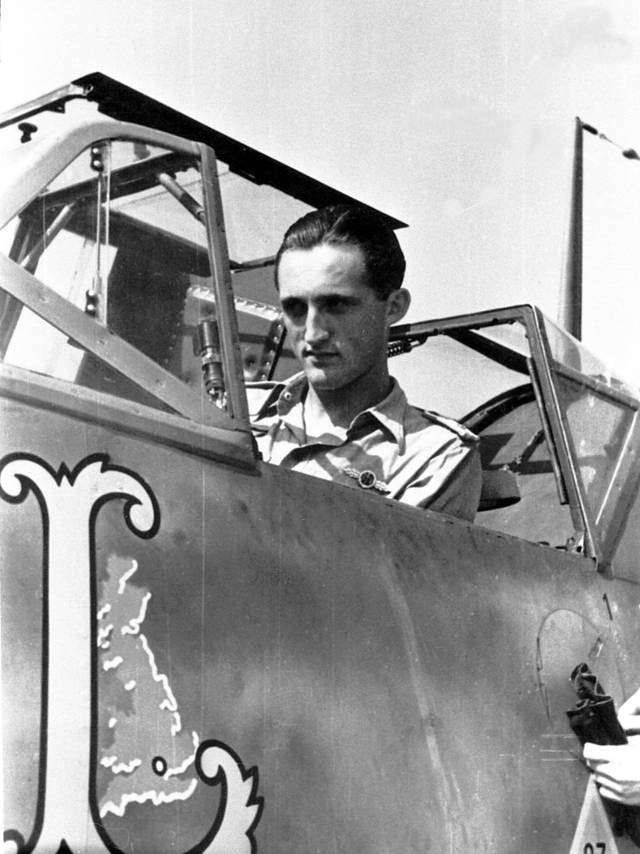
Geisshardt in a Messerschmitt Bf 109 F-2/F-4

Friedrich Geißhardt (Note: His name, in German, is spelled with a "sharp S"; see ß.) (22 January 1919 – 6 April 1943) was a German military aviator in the Luftwaffe during World War II. As a fighter ace, he was credited with 102 victories in 642 combat missions, including 37 close air support missions. He achieved 63 of his victories over the Eastern Front. In his total are at least seventeen Spitfires.

== List of aerial victories claimed ==
According to US historian David T. Zabecki, Geißhardt was credited with 104 aerial victories. Spick lists Geißhardt with 102 enemy aircraft shot down in 642 combat missions, of which one was claimed during the invasion of Poland, 14 during the Battle of France and Britain, 75 over the Eastern Front, nine in the Mediterranean theater and three over North Africa. Mathews and Foreman, authors of Luftwaffe Aces – Biographies and Victory Claims, researched the German Federal Archives and found records for 93 aerial victory claims, plus eight further unconfirmed claims. This figure includes 60 aerial victories on the Eastern Front and 33 over the Western Allies.

Victory claims were logged to a map-reference (PQ = Planquadrat), for example "PQ 76892". The Luftwaffe grid map (Jägermeldenetz) covered all of Europe, western Russia and North Africa and was composed of rectangles measuring 15 minutes of latitude by 30 minutes of longitude, an area of about 360 square miles (930 km^{2}). These sectors were then subdivided into 36 smaller units to give a location area 3 km × 4 km (1.9 mi × 2.5 mi) in size.

This and the ♠ (Ace of spades) indicates those aerial victories which made Geißhardt an "ace-in-a-day", a term which designates a fighter pilot who has shot down five or more airplanes in a single day.
This and the – (dash) indicates unconfirmed aerial victory claims for which Geißhardt did not receive credit.
This and the ? (question mark) indicates information discrepancies listed by Prien, Stemmer, Rodeike, Bock, Łydżba, Mathews and Foreman.

Claim	Date	Time	Type	Location	Unit	Claim	Date	Time	Type	Location	Unit
– Claims with Jagdgeschwader 77 in Poland – September 1939
1	9 September 1939	16:30	PZL P.24 (PZL P.11c) (Note: According to Łydżba a PZL P.11c.)	Lubień vicinity of Bromberg	2.(J)/LG 2						
– Claims with Jagdgeschwader 77 against England – June – November 1940
— ? (Note: According to Prien's 1995 book, this claim is listed as his 2nd aerial victory claimed at 15:40 over a Hawker Hurricane.)	4 July 1940	15:30?	Spitfire?	over St Margaret's Bay	1.(J)/LG 2	5	7 September 1940	18:00	Hurricane	Maidstone	1.(J)/LG 2
2	4 July 1940	20:00	Hurricane	Dungeness	1.(J)/LG 2	6	23 September 1940	10:35	Spitfire		1.(J)/LG 2
3? (Note: According to Mathews and Foreman, this claim is unconfirmed.)	13 August 1940	—	Blenheim		1.(J)/LG 2	7? (Note: This claim is not listed in Prien's 1995 book.)	26 October 1940	12:40	Spitfire	west of Boulogne	1.(J)/LG 2
4	24 August 1940	12:30	Spitfire	Dover	1.(J)/LG 2						
– Claims with Jagdgeschwader 77 on the Channel Front – November 1940 – March 1941
8	2 February 1941	15:30	Spitfire	40 km (25 mi) west of Cap Gris-Nez	1.(J)/LG 2	— ? (Note: This unconfirmed claim is not listed in Prien's 1995 book.)	25 February 1941	—	Spitfire	Deal	1.(J)/LG 2
9	11 February 1941	17:22	Spitfire	Cap Blanc-Nez	1.(J)/LG 2	11?	24 March 1941	19:45	Spitfire? (Note: According to Prien's 1995 book, claimed as a Hawker Hurricane.)	middle of the English Channel	1.(J)/LG 2
10	14 February 1941	13:13? (Note: According to Prien's 1995 book, claimed at 13:00.)	Spitfire	west of Dover	1.(J)/LG 2	12	27 March 1941	18:15? (Note: According to Prien's 1995 book, claimed at 18:45.)	Spitfire	southwest of Folkstone	Stab I./LG 2
— ? (Note: According to Prien's 1995 book, this claim is listed as his 11th aerial victory.)	14 February 1941	— ? (Note: According to Prien's 1995 book, claimed at 13:05.)	Spitfire	west of Dover	1.(J)/LG 2						
– Claims with Jagdgeschwader 77 during the Balkan Campaign – April 1941
13	6 April 1941	06:12	Fury	Kumanovo	Stab I./LG 2	15	6 April 1941	06:20	Fury	Kumanovo	Stab I./LG 2
14	6 April 1941	06:15	Fury	Kumanovo	Stab I./LG 2	16	6 April 1941	—	Fury	Kumanovo	Stab I./LG 2
– Claims with Jagdgeschwader 77 in Crete – May 1941
17	16 May 1941	17:10? (Note: According to Prien's 1995 book, claimed at 17:00.)	Hurricane	Maleme	Stab I./LG 2	18	26 May 1941	15:30	Hurricane		Stab I./LG 2
– Claims with Jagdgeschwader 77 on the Eastern Front – Operation Barbarossa — 22 June – 5 December 1941
19	23 June 1941	05:52	SB-2	Grossolowo	Stab I./LG 2	23	2 July 1941	12:55	I-153		Stab I./LG 2
20	23 June 1941	18:50	I-18	Czernowitz	Stab I./LG 2	24	7 July 1941	11:00	I-16	Bălți	Stab I./LG 2
21	27 June 1941	09:25	I-16		Stab I./LG 2	25	11 July 1941	10:12	MiG-3		Stab I./LG 2
22	2 July 1941	08:50	MiG-3	Tudora	Stab I./LG 2						
According to Prien, Stemmer, Rodeike and Bock, Geißhardt claimed his 26th aerial victory on 11 July 1941 over a Polikarpov I-16 fighter, or on 17 July 1941 over a Tupolev SB-2 bomber.
27	3 August 1941	14:15	DB-3	Mamaia	Stab I./LG 2						
– Claims with Jagdgeschwader 77 on the Eastern Front – Winter War — December 1941 – April 1942
28	28 December 1941	15:30? (Note: According to Prien's 1995 book, claimed at 15:10.)	I-16		Stab I./LG 2	48	8 April 1942	15:30	I-16		Stab I./JG 77
29	23 January 1942	15:30	I-16		Stab I./JG 77	49	19 April 1942	09:15	I-61		Stab I./JG 77
30	24 January 1942	09:35? (Note: According to Prien's 1995 book, claimed at 10:00.)	I-16		Stab I./JG 77	50	19 April 1942	11:18	I-61 (MiG-3)		Stab I./JG 77
31	24 January 1942	12:05? (Note: According to Prien's 1995 book, claimed at 14:00.)	I-16		Stab I./JG 77	51	19 April 1942	15:25	I-61 (MiG-3)		Stab I./JG 77
32	3 February 1942	09:45? (Note: According to Prien's 1995 book, claimed at 12:00.)	R-5		Stab I./JG 77	52♠	20 April 1942	08:12	I-61 (MiG-3)		Stab I./JG 77
33	11 February 1942	14:02? (Note: According to Prien's 1995 book, claimed at 14:15.)	I-153		Stab I./JG 77	53♠	20 April 1942	08:14	I-61 (MiG-3)		Stab I./JG 77
34	18 February 1942	12:40	DB-3		Stab I./JG 77	54♠	20 April 1942	11:40	I-61 (MiG-3)		Stab I./JG 77
35	18 February 1942	12:45	DB-3		Stab I./JG 77	55♠	20 April 1942	14:57	I-61 (MiG-3)		Stab I./JG 77
36	20 February 1942	14:30	I-301 (LaGG-3)		Stab I./JG 77	56♠	20 April 1942	14:58	I-61 (MiG-3)		Stab I./JG 77
37	24 February 1942	13:57? (Note: According to Prien's 1995 book, claimed at 15:00.)	I-16		Stab I./JG 77	57	21 April 1942	15:28? (Note: According to Prien's 1995 book, claimed at 15:10 over an I-61.)	I-301 (LaGG-3)?		Stab I./JG 77
38	24 February 1942	14:00?	I-16		Stab I./JG 77	58	21 April 1942	15:30?	I-301 (LaGG-3)?		Stab I./JG 77
39	28 February 1942	16:12?? (Note: According to Prien's 1995 book, claimed at 16:10 over a Lavochkin-Gorbunov-Gudkov LaGG-1.)	I-301 (LaGG-3)?		Stab I./JG 77	59	22 April 1942	07:00	LaGG-1		Stab I./JG 77
40	1 March 1942	16:40? (Note: According to Prien's 1995 book, claimed at 16:50 over a Yakovlev aircraft of unknown type.)	I-26 (Yak-1)?		Stab I./JG 77	60	22 April 1942	07:00	LaGG-1		Stab I./JG 77
41	9 March 1942	14:30?? (Note: According to Prien's 1995 book, claimed at 14:20 over a Lavochkin-Gorbunov-Gudkov LaGG-1.)	I-301 (LaGG-3)?		Stab I./JG 77	61♠	25 April 1942	07:00	LaGG-3		Stab I./JG 77
42	16 March 1942	13:20? (Note: According to Prien's 1995 book, claimed at 13:25.)	R-5		Stab I./JG 77	62♠	25 April 1942	12:00	I-16		Stab I./JG 77
43	21 March 1942	14:45	R-5? (Note: According to Prien's 1995 book, claimed over a Polikarpov R-5.)		Stab I./JG 77	63♠	25 April 1942	12:00	I-16		Stab I./JG 77
44	21 March 1942	17:03	I-16		Stab I./JG 77	64♠	25 April 1942	12:00	I-16		Stab I./JG 77
45	24 March 1942	07:00	I-26 (Yak-1)		Stab I./JG 77	65♠	25 April 1942	16:00	LaGG-3		Stab I./JG 77
46	6 April 1942	15:00	I-61		Stab I./JG 77	66♠	25 April 1942	16:00	LaGG-3		Stab I./JG 77
47	6 April 1942	16:50	R-5		Stab I./JG 77	67♠	25 April 1942	16:00	I-153		Stab I./JG 77
– Claims with Jagdgeschwader 77 on the Eastern Front – Kerch, Sevastopol, Izium — May/June 1942
68	7 May 1942	14:30	R-5		3./JG 77	76	20 May 1942	15:45	LaGG-3		3./JG 77
69	7 May 1942	14:30	I-153		3./JG 77	77?	28 May 1942	16:15	Yak-1	PQ 76892	3./JG 77
70	7 May 1942	16:20? (Note: According to Prien's 1995 book, claimed at 16:30.)	LaGG-3		3./JG 77	78?	28 May 1942	16:15	Yak-1	PQ 76894	3./JG 77
71	7 May 1942	16:35?	LaGG-3		3./JG 77	—	1 June 1942	14:35	LaGG-3? (Note: According to Prien's 1995 book, claimed as a Polikarpov I-16.)	PQ 66536	3./JG 77
72	8 May 1942	12:35? (Note: According to Prien's 1995 book, claimed at 15:30.)	I-15		3./JG 77	79	9 June 1942	15:35? (Note: According to Prien's 1995 book, claimed at 16:00.)	Il-2	Taman	3./JG 77
73	15 May 1942	16:00	I-16		3./JG 77	80	16 June 1942	17:00	LaGG-3	Taman	3./JG 77
74	17 May 1942	05:27? (Note: According to Prien's 1995 book, claimed at 05:00.)	LaGG-3		3./JG 77	81	22 June 1942	18:50? (Note: According to Prien's 1995 book, claimed at 18:45.)	LaGG-3	PQ 75152	3./JG 77
75	18 May 1942	15:30? (Note: According to Prien's 1995 book, claimed at 15:00.)	R-10		3./JG 77	82	22 June 1942	18:55?	LaGG-3	PQ 75161	3./JG 77
– Claims with I. Gruppe/Jagdgeschwader 77 over Sicily – July – October 1942
83	11 July 1942	17:46	Spitfire		3./JG 77	87	8 September 1942	—	Spitfire		3./JG 77
—	11 July 1942	—	Spitfire		3./JG 77	88	10 October 1942	08:50	Spitfire		3./JG 77
84	20 July 1942	14:10	Spitfire		3./JG 77	89	13 October 1942	17:18	Spitfire		3./JG 77
85	26 July 1942	10:10	Spitfire		3./JG 77	90	15 October 1942	11:00	Spitfire		3./JG 77
86	29 July 1942	10:20	Spitfire		3./JG 77	91	15 October 1942	11:05	Spitfire		3./JG 77
– Claims with Jagdgeschwader 77 in North Africa – October – November 1942
92	3 November 1942	—	P-40		3./JG 77	97	5 November 1942	—	P-40	north of Fukah	3./JG 77
93	4 November 1942	—	P-40	west of El Dabaa	3./JG 77	98	5 November 1942	—	P-40	north of Fukah	3./JG 77
94	4 November 1942	—	P-40	west of El Dabaa	3./JG 77	99	9 November 1942	—	P-40	east of Halfaya Pass	3./JG 77
95	4 November 1942	—	P-40		3./JG 77	100	10 November 1942	—	Spitfire		3./JG 77
96	4 November 1942	—	P-40		3./JG 77						
