= Klaus Bretschneider =

German night fighter ace and Knight's Cross recipient

- Born: 4 May 1920; Berlin
- Died: 24 December 1944 (aged 24); Oberaula-Hausen near Kassel
- Cause of death: Killed in action
- Military career
- Allegiance: Nazi Germany
- Branch: Luftwaffe
- Service years: ?–1944
- Rank: Oberleutnant (first lieutenant)
- Unit: JG 300
- Conflicts: World War II: Defense of the Reich
- Awards: Knight's Cross of the Iron Cross

Klaus Bretschneider (4 May 1920 – 24 December 1944) was a German Luftwaffe ace and recipient of the Knight's Cross of the Iron Cross (Ritterkreuz des Eisernen Kreuzes) during World War II. The Knight's Cross of the Iron Cross, and its variants were the highest awards in the military and paramilitary forces of Nazi Germany during World War II.

== Career ==
Bretschneider was born on 4 May 1920 in Berlin-Steglitz, at the capital of the Weimar Republic. He was posted into the newly raised Jagdgeschwader 300 (JG 300—300th Fighter Wing) in July 1943. There he was posted to 6. Staffel, flying "Wilde Sau" single-seat night fighter missions. Bretschneider claimed his first aerial victory on the night of 27/28 August 1943. That night, the Royal Air Force (RAF) Bomber Command attacked Nürnberg. At 01:55, Bretschneider shot down a Short Stirling bomber east of Nürnberg. The destruction of the bomber was also claimed by anti-aircraft artillery unit but the destruction was later credited to Bretschneider. On the night of 5/6 September, Bomber Command sent 605 heavy bombers on a mission to bomb Mannheim. In total, 512 bombers hit Mannheim for the loss of 36 bombers destroyed. Defending against this attack, Bretschneider claimed a Avro Lancaster destroyed which was shared with an anti-aircraft artillery unit. He then attacked a second bomber, setting the wing on fire.

By April 1944 he had 14 night victories.

=== Defense of the Reich ===
On 28 May 1944, Reichsmarschall Hermann Göring ordered JG 300 to convert from its night fighter role to the day flying, flying missions in defense of the Reich. At the time, the Sturmgruppe was based at Dortmund Airfield. On 7 June, they relocated to Merzhausen and before reaching Frankfurt Airfield on 12 June. Three days later, the Sturmgruppe moved again, this time to Unterschlauersbach, present-day part of Großhabersdorf.

On 7 July, a force of 1,129 B-17 Flying Fortresses and B-24 Liberators of the United States Army Air Forces (USAAF) Eighth Air Force set out from England to bomb aircraft factories in the Leipzig area and the synthetic oil plants at Boehlen, Leuna-Merseburg and Lützkendorf. This formation was intercepted by a German Gefechtsverband (combat formation) consisting of IV. Sturmgruppe of JG 3, led by Hauptmann Wilhelm Moritz, escorted by two Gruppen of Messerschmitt Bf 109s from JG 300 led by Major Walther Dahl. Dahl and Moritz drove the attack to point-blank range behind the Liberators of the 492d Bombardment Group before opening fire. 492d Bombardment Group was temporarily without fighter cover. Within about a minute the entire squadron of twelve B-24s had been annihilated. The Germans claimed 28 USAAF 2nd Air Division B-24s that day and were credited with at least 21. The majority to the Sturmgruppe attack. In this encounter, also known as the Luftschlacht bei Oschersleben (aerial battle at Oschersleben), Bretschneider claimed a B-24 bombers shot down near Calbe.

=== Squadron leader and death ===
On 19 July 1944, Bretschneider was appointed Staffelkapitän (squadron leader) of 5. Staffel of JG 300. He succeeded Hauptmann Rudolf Scharfenberg who had been killed in action the day before. By this time JG 300 were employed in a more conventional day fighter role, intercepting USAAF four-engined bombers.

On 7 October 1944 he downed two bombers in one attack and then rammed a third. He bailed out safely. On 18 November 1944 he received the Knight's Cross of the Iron Cross for 31 victories.

On 24 December 1944, Bretschneider was killed in action whilst leading II.(Sturm)/JG 300 in attacking four-engined bombers over Kassel. His Focke-Wulf Fw 190 A-8/R2 (Werknummer 682204—factory number) crashed near Hausen, part of Oberaula. He was probably shot down by a North American P-51 Mustang of the 357th Fighter Group. Command of 5. Staffel was then passed on to Leutnant Norbert Graziadei.

== Summary of career ==
=== Aerial victory claims ===
According to Spick, Bretschneider was credited with at least 31 aerial victories. This figure includes 17 by day, among them three four-engined heavy bombers, and 14 nocturnal claims flying 20 "Wilde Sau" night fighter missions. Obermaier lists him with 34 enemy aircraft shot down, 14 RAF bombers at night, and 20 day-victories including 17 USAAF four-engined heavy bombers by day. Forsyth also states that Bretschneider claimed 17 four-engined heavy bombers by day. Mathews and Foreman, authors of Luftwaffe Aces — Biographies and Victory Claims, researched the German Federal Archives and found records for 22 aerial victory claims, including four at night, plus 18 further unconfirmed claims. This figure of confirmed claims includes 15 four-engine heavy bombers by day.

Victory claims were logged to a map-reference (PQ = Planquadrat), for example "PQ 15 Ost S/JD". The Luftwaffe grid map (Jägermeldenetz) covered all of Europe, western Russia and North Africa and was composed of rectangles measuring 15 minutes of latitude by 30 minutes of longitude, an area of about 360 square miles (930 km^{2}). These sectors were then subdivided into 36 smaller units to give a location area 3 km × 4 km (1.9 mi × 2.5 mi) in size.

Chronicle of aerial victories
This and the – (dash) indicates unconfirmed aerial victory claims for which Bretschneider did not receive credit. This along with the * (asterisk) indicates an Herausschuss (separation shot)—a severely damaged heavy bomber forced to separate from his combat box which was counted as an aerial victory. This and the ? (question mark) indicates information discrepancies listed by Lorant, Goyat, Prien, Stemmer, Rodeike, Balke, Bock, Mathews and Foreman.
Claim	Date	Time	Type	Location	Serial No./Squadron No.
– 6. Staffel of Jagdgeschwader 300 – "Wilde Sau" nocturnal missions
1	28 August 1943	01:55	Stirling	east of Nürnberg	
2? (Note: According to Mathews and Foreman this claim is unconfirmed. Lorant and Goyat list this claim as his 2nd confirmed aerial victory.)	6 September 1943	00:20	Lancaster	south of Mannheim	Lancaster ED416/No. 49 Squadron RAF
—	6 September 1943	—	four-engined bomber		
—	6/7 September 1943	—	four-engined bomber	vicinity of Munich	
—	22 September 1943	23:15	Lancaster	20 km (12 mi) west of Bremen	
—	23/24 September 1943	—	four-engined bomber		
—	3/4 October 1943	—	Halifax	Kassel	
—	4/5 October 1943	—	Lancaster		
—	16/17 December 1943	—	Lancaster	Ruppiner See	
—	29/30 December 1943	—	four-engined bomber		
—	29 January 1944	—	four-engined bomber		
—	18/19 March 1944	—	four-engined bomber		
9? (Note: According to Mathews and Foreman this claim is unconfirmed. Lorant and Goyat list this claim as his 9th confirmed aerial victory.)	25 March 1944	00:27	four-engined bomber	north of Krefeld	
10	25 March 1944	00:41	four-engined bomber	north of Krefeld	
11	31 March 1944	00:35	four-engined bomber	vicinity of Gießen vicinity of Stuttgart	
—	23 April 1944	—	four-engined bomber	Düsseldorf	
—	23 April 1944	—	four-engined bomber		
– 5. Staffel of Jagdgeschwader 300 – Defense of the Reich daytime missions
—	13 June 1944	—	B-24		
	20 June 1944	09:26	B-17	Salzwedel/Stendal	
	21 June 1944	10:23	P-51	north of Potsdam	
	26 June 1944	09:37	B-24	Tulln	
	7 July 1944	09:35	B-24	PQ 15 Ost S/JD, Calbe	
	22 August 1944	10:05	B-24	PQ 14 Ost N/HP-HQ	
	24 August 1944	12:48	B-24*	Budweis/Protectorate	
	11 September 1944	13:35	B-24	PQ 15 Ost S/HA	
	12 September 1944	11:31	B-17	PQ 15 Ost S/EH	
	7 October 1944	12:05	B-17	PQ 15 Ost S/LC	
	7 October 1944	12:06	B-17*	PQ 15 Ost S/LC	
	7 October 1944	12:06	B-17*	PQ 15 Ost S/LC	

=== Awards ===
- Iron Cross (1939) 2nd and 1st Class
- German Cross in Gold in 1944 as Oberleutnant in the 5./Jagdgeschwader 300
- Knight's Cross of the Iron Cross on 18 November 1944 as Leutnant and pilot in 5./Jagdgeschwader 300 (Note: According to Scherzer as pilot in the 5.(Sturm)/Jagdgeschwader 300.)
