= Alfred Lindenberger =

German flying ace

- Born: 22 April 1897; Stuttgart
- Died: 30 June 1973 (aged 76); Nürtingen
- Military career
- Allegiance: Germany
- Branch: Imperial German Air Service, Luftwaffe
- Rank: Leutnant (later Major)
- Unit: FA 234, Jagdstaffel 2
- Other work: Commanded JG 300 of the Luftwaffe during World War II

Leutnant (later Major) Alfred Lindenberger was a World War I flying ace credited with twelve aerial victories. He also scored four victories during World War II while serving as commander of a fighter group.

== World War I military service ==
While Lindenberger was a gunner in FA 234, he shot down a Spad with pilot Vizfeldwebel Breitenstein on 29 May 1917. Then he was teamed with ace pilot Vizfeldwebel Karl Jentsch, and they scored two more SPADs in October. After pilot training, in May 1918 Lindenberger was posted to Jagdstaffel 2. Between 30 May and 1 November 1918, he downed nine more enemy planes, seven flying the Fokker D.VII. He also flew Fokker D.VI serial number 4453/18 upon occasion. It was marked with black and yellow stripes around the fuselage.

== Aerial victories ==
No.	Date	Foe	Location	Notes
1	29 May 1917	SPAD	Cerny	Lindenberger's pilot was Vizfeldwebel Breitenstein
2	2 October 1917	SPAD	North of Soupir	Lindenberger's pilot was Karl Jentsch
3	21 October 1917	SPAD	Braucourt-Fresnes	Lindenberger's pilot was Karl Jentsch
4	30 May 1918	Breguet 14	Villers-Cotterêts	
5	1 June 1918	Breguet 14	Priez	
6	18 June 1918	Breguet 14	Moulin-sous-Touvent	
7	20 August 1918	AR2	West of Champs	
8	31 August 1918	Royal Aircraft Factory RE.8	Haynecourt	
9	3 September 1918	Bristol F.2b	Combles	Victim from No. 20 Squadron RAF
10	6 September 1918	Sopwith Camel	Lagnicourt	Victim from No. 208 Squadron RAF
11	30 October 1918	Royal Aircraft Factory SE.5a	Harchies	Victim from No. 32 Squadron RAF
12	1 November 1918	Royal Aircraft Factory SE.5a	Southwest of Harchies	Victim from No. 32 Squadron RAF

== Between the Wars ==
Alfred Lindenberger joined the Luftwaffe and rose to the rank of major.

== World War II military service ==
In June 1944, Major Lindenberger served with JG 3 and then flew air defense sorties with JG 300 over Germany until February 1945. He was made II./ JG 300 Gruppenkommandeur in October 1944. Owing to his age and inexperience with modern fighters he flew most sorties as a wingman. On 28 September 1944 he claimed a B-17 over Hildesheim and a P-51 Mustang near Quedlinburg before he was shot down by P-51s and wounded, bailing out over Halberstadt. Lindenberger then claimed two US B-24 four-engined bombers on 17 December 1944 during a 15th Air Force raid over Poland, (JG 300 claimed 22 B-24s downed).

He thus scored four World War II victories in total, making his lifetime tally sixteen aerial victories.
