= Jagdgeschwader 300 =

Luftwaffe fighter wing

- Active: 1943–45
- Country: Nazi Germany
- Branch: Luftwaffe
- Type: Fighter Aircraft
- Role: Air superiority
- Size: Air Force Wing
- Nickname(s): Wilde Sau

Commanders
- Notable commanders: Hajo Herrmann (26 June 1943 – 26 September 1943); Günther Rall (15 June – 6 August 1944)

Aircraft flown
- Fighter: Bf 109, Fw 190

Jagdgeschwader 300 (JG 300) was a Luftwaffe fighter-wing of World War II. JG 300 was formed on 26 June 1943 in Deelen as Stab/Versuchskommando Herrmann, from July 18, 1943 as Stab/JG Herrmann and finally renamed on August 20, 1943 to Stab/JG 300. Its first Geschwaderkommodore was Oberstleutnant Hajo Herrmann.

== Genesis and Wilde Sau ==
JG 300 had its origins in April 1943, when Major Hajo Herrmann, a decorated bomber pilot, advocated the use of single-seat day fighters as night fighters against the Royal Air Force (RAF) bomber offensive. He suggested that single seat fighters could operate in the bombers' general target area using the light of target indicators, massed searchlights and the fires on the ground to spot their targets. These operations were tested over Berlin during May and June 1943 and codenamed Wilde Sau.

Recruiting a group of experienced bomber pilots and former instructors with the requisite blind-flying experience, a test unit was set up on June 26, 1943 in Deelen as Stab/Versuchskommando Herrmann to test Herrmann's theory. Standard Fw 190-As and Bf 109-Gs were used, initially 'borrowed' from their parent day units, principally Jagdgeschwader 1 and Jagdgeschwader 11.

Jagdgeschwader 300 employed the Wilde Sau tactic in single-engined fighters for the first time on the night of 3/4 July 1943, when 653 RAF aircraft attacked Cologne's industrial area on the east bank of the Rhine. The German fighters, taking advantage of the illumination from searchlights, target indicator flares and ground fires, claimed 12 aircraft shot down but had to share their claims with the anti-aircraft batteries who also claimed the 12 bombers. To avoid losses to friendly fire, anti-aircraft batteries were ordered to restrict the height of their flak barrage and the fighters operated above that ceiling.

The test unit expanded into JG 300, its I. Gruppe officially formed on August 20, 1943. Sister units JG 301 and JG 302 were also formed on similar lines at this time, collectively brought together as 30. Jagd-Division under Herrmann's command. Special variants of the Bf 109 were later adapted for this night fighter duty; the Bf 109 G-6(N) and Bf 109 G-6(Y). The former was fitted with the FuG 350 Naxos Z passive homing detector and the latter with the "Y" interception radio system; initially the single-seat fighters used no radar or radio aids.

Although 30. Jagd-Division was initially far from a fully established Jagdgeschwader, the formation process was sped up with RAF Bomber Command deployment in July 1943 of Window; radar-jamming tin-foil strips which had rendered the Luftwaffe radar control system ineffective. JG 300 and its sister units were the only interim counter measure, while Luftwaffe radar researchers strove to overcome this jamming.

JG 300 night operations met with considerable initial success. Its first formal defensive operation on 27/28 July 1943 saw the unit claim four of the 17 bombers downed that night for one loss. Some 13 (out of a Nachtjagd total of 56 claimed) bombers were claimed shot down by JG 300 on the night of 24 August, while12 more were claimed on 27–28 August. 10 (from a total of 47) were claimed 1 September and another 18 on 5–6 September.

The number of night accidents involving single-seat fighters caused by poor weather in the winter of 1943, led to unsustainable losses in pilots and aircraft. Thus by the end of 1943, JG 300 fielded 3 Fw 190 A-6 (Stab), 14 Bf 109 G-6 (I Gruppe), 4 Fw 190 A-6 (II Gruppe) and 1 Bf 109 G-6 (III Gruppe). On 1 January 1944, parts of I./JG 300 was detached and used to form 1./Nachtjagdgruppe 10. By early 1944 the Nachtjagdgeschwaders has been equipped with the advanced and "window-proof" Lichtenstein SN-2 VHF airborne radar and JG 300 gradually evolved into a standard day fighter unit, flying operations against the USAAF 8th and 15th Air Forces over Western Europe as a part of Reichsverteidigung (Defense of the Reich).

Night operations were still sometimes flown, as on the 24/25 March 1944, when I. and II./JG 300 claimed 7 RAF bombers for one loss. By this time Oblt. Klaus Bretschneider of 5./JG 300 had claimed 14 Wilde Sau victories, during 20 combats.

By May 1944, JG 300 at last had numbers approaching a full establishment of aircraft, with I./JG 300 having 42 (14 operative) Bf 109 G-6 at Bonn Hangelar; II./JG 300 stationed at Dortmund with 25 (13) Fw 190 A-6 and III./ JG 300 with 46 (25 operative) Bf 109 G-6 at Wiesbaden/Erbenheim. Major Walther Dahl was appointed Kommodore of JG 300 on 27 June.

JG 300 lost several of its top aces in the summer of 1944. On 28 July 1944, Oblt. Ernst-Erich Hirschfeld (24 claims, 9 at night) of 5. JG 300 was shot down and killed in his Fw 190 A-8 near Erfurt, as was Leut. Gerhard Bärsdorf (7 claims) who collided with his wing man. On 29 July 1944, Oberfeldwebel Hermann Wischnewski (26 claims) of I./JG 300 shot down two B-17 bombers and a P-51 fighter but was then shot down and badly injured.

== Sturmgruppen ==
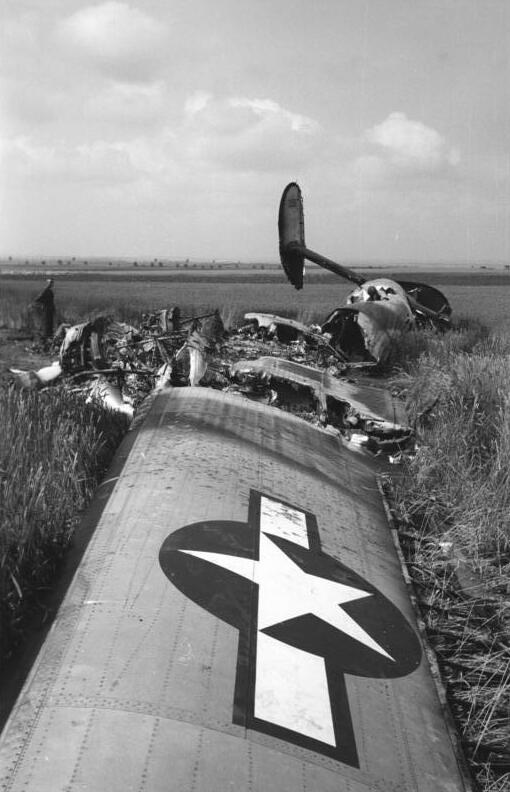
Downed Consolidated B-24 Liberator of the 492d Bombardment Group after an aerial battle at Oschersleben on 7 July 1944

In the summer of 1944 Sturmgruppe units were raised, equipped with heavily armoured and armed FW 190 fighters and charged with breaking up the massed ranks of USAAF daylight bombers. Initially crewed by volunteers, each pilot was trained to close with the enemy and engage in extremely short-range combat, attacking from the front and the rear in tight arrowhead formations, even to contemplate deliberately ramming enemy bombers when circumstances permitted.

II./ JG 300 became a Sturmgruppe unit at this time. Equipped with the Focke-Wulf 190 A-8/R2 or R8 with two MK 108 30mm cannon, and two MG 151/20 20mm cannon, it enjoyed initial success in downing bombers but also suffered heavy losses to the massed fighter escorts. From June 1944 until the end of October 1944, II Gruppe suffered some 73 killed, 2 missing, and 32 wounded.

On 7 July 1944 a force of 1,129 B-17 Flying Fortresses and B-24 Liberators of the United States Army Air Forces (USAAF) Eighth Air Force set out from England to bomb aircraft factories in the Leipzig area and the synthetic oil plants at Boehlen, Leuna-Merseburg and Lützkendorf. This formation was intercepted by a German Gefechtsverband comprising IV. (Sturm) Gruppe Jagdgeschwader 3, escorted by two Gruppen of Bf 109s from JG 300 led by Major Walther Dahl. Dahl drove the attack to point-blank range behind the Liberators of the 492nd Bomb Group, which at the time was temporarily without fighter cover, before opening fire. Within about a minute the entire squadron of twelve B-24s had been annihilated. The USAAF 2nd Air Division lost 28 Liberators that day, the majority to the Sturmgruppe attack. IV. /JG 3 had nine fighters shot down and three more suffered damage and made crash landings; five pilots were killed.

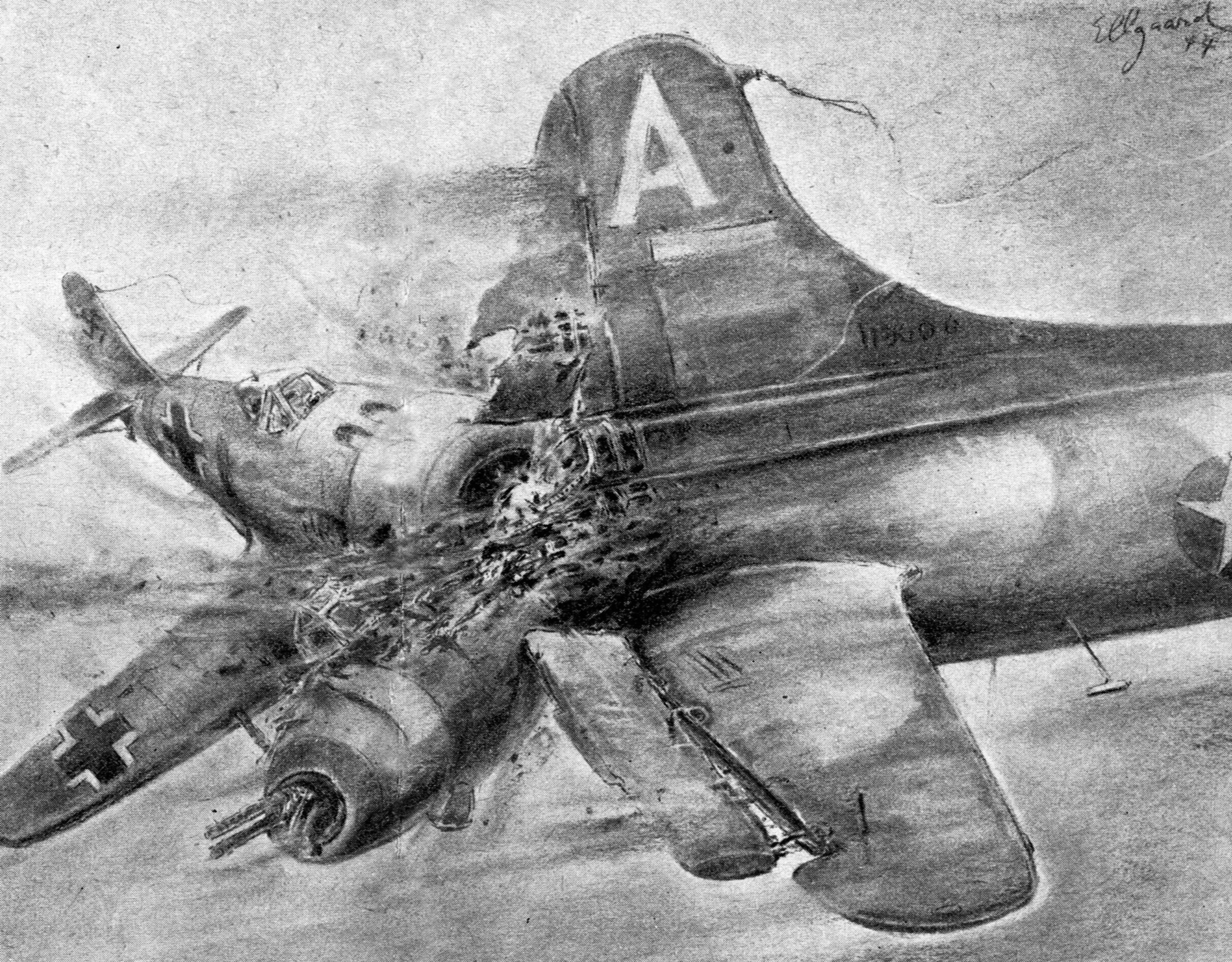
A 1944 drawing by Helmuth Ellgaard illustrating "ramming"

USAAF escort fighters were increasingly effective. On 11 September 1944 II. (Sturm)/JG 300 lost 13 Fw 190s to P-51 Mustangs, with 10 pilots killed and two wounded. They claimed nine Mustangs; actual Mustang losses was just one 339th Fighter Group P-51, damaged by Flak and shot down by an Me 262. I. /JG 300, flying top cover, lost 13 Bf 109s without claiming a kill. One pilot was killed and one wounded. Major Alfred Lindenberger, (a forty-seven-year-old Prussian World War I ace with 12 victories) was posted to II. /JG 300 in June 1944 and was made Gruppenkommandeur later in 1944. On 28 September 1944 he was shot down by P-51s and wounded. Owing to his age and inexperience with modern fighters he flew most sorties as a wingman. Lindenberger claimed two US four-engined bombers on 17 December 1944.

As the year progressed the 30 Jagddivision was broken up, as JG 301 left for Ploiești in Romania while JG 302 flew combat over Hungary and Austria. Only JG 300 remained in the Reich. Major Dahl was dismissed from his command of JG 300 by Hermann Göring on 30 November 1944, for refusal to launch what he considered a suicidal interception mission.

During the Ardennes offensive in late 1944, JG 300 was one of the few units remaining on Reich defence duties, with most other fighter units sent to support attacking ground forces. The Geschwader took heavy losses in late 1944, particularly on 17 December when 100 aircraft of JG 300 intercepted USAAF bombers, claiming 33 shot down but losing 43 of their own number. Many of the pilots killed were irreplaceable Experten, including on 24 December 1944, the Staffelkapitän of 5. /JG 300 Oblt Klaus Bretschneider, who was shot down by 357th FG P-51s (who claimed 28 fighters for 2 losses).

On 14 January 1945 a mixed formation of JG 300 and JG 301 were attacked by USAAF escort fighters, during an interception against the USAAF 3rd Air Division, bombing oil targets over central Germany. The two Geschwader claimed 18 B-17s, 7 P-51s and one P-47 downed, although the mixed formation lost 89 aircraft with 52 killed and 18 wounded. (JG 300 lost 51 fighters, with 32 pilots killed and 10 wounded).The 357th Fighter Group claimed over 50 kills, and the 56th FG and the 20th FG also claimed victories.

On 14 February 1945, operations against the USAAF bomber streams by JG 300 and JG 301 led to I. and III. /JG 300 losing 3 Bf 109s and II. /JG 300 losing 6 Fw 190s.

== Commanding officers ==
- Oberstleutnant Hajo Herrmann, June – 26 September 1943
- Oberstleutnant Kurt Kettner, 26 September 1943 – 27 June 1944
- Oberstleutnant Walther Dahl, 27 June 1944 – 26 January 1945
- Major Kurd Peters (acting), December 1944 – January 1945
- Major Anton Hackl, 30 January – 20 February 1945
- Major Kurd Peters (acting), March – April 1945
- Major Günther Rall, 20 February – 8 May 1945

== See also ==
Organization of the Luftwaffe during World War II

== Notes and references ==
=== Bibliography ===
- Aders, Gebhard (1979). History of the German Night Fighter Force, 1917–1945. London: Janes Publishing. ISBN 0-354-01247-9.
- Bethke, Herbert and Henning, Friedhelm (2000). Jagdgeschwader 300: Wilde Sau: TEIL 1. ISBN 3-923457-55-3.
- Bethke, Herbert and Henning, Friedhelm (2001). Jagdgeschwader 300: Wilde Sau: TEIL 2. ISBN 3-923457-58-8.
- Caldwell, Donald; Muller, Richard (2007). The Luftwaffe over Germany: Defense of the Reich. London, UK: Greenhill. ISBN 978-1-85367-712-0.
- Foreman, John; Mathews, Johannes; Parry, Simon (2004). Luftwaffe Night Fighter Claims 1939–1945. Walton on Thames: Red Kite. ISBN 978-0-9538061-4-0.
- Hinchcliffe, Peter (1996). The Other Battle: Luftwaffe Night Aces vs Bomber Command. London: Zenith Press. ISBN 0-7603-0265-0.
- Lorant, Jean Yves and Goyat, Richard (2005). Jagdgeschwader 300 "Wilde Sau" - Volume One: June 1943 – September 1944. Eagle Edition Ltd. ISBN 0-9761034-0-0.
- Lorant, Jean Yves and Goyat, Richard (2007). Jagdgeschwader 300 "Wilde Sau" - Volume Two: September 1944 – May 1945. Eagle Edition Ltd. ISBN 0-9761034-2-7.
- Weal, John (1996). Focke-Wulf Fw 190 Aces of the Western Front. Oxford, UK: Osprey Publishing. ISBN 978-1-85532-595-1.
