= Johannes Seifert =

German World War II fighter pilot (1915–1943)

- Born: 6 October 1915; Pinneberg, German Empire
- Died: 25 November 1943 (aged 28); Béthune, France
- Cause of death: Killed in action
- Burial place: Bourdon German war cemetery, France
- Military career
- Allegiance: Nazi Germany
- Branch: Luftwaffe
- Service years: ?–1943
- Rank: Oberstleutnant (Posthumously)
- Nickname: "Hannes"
- Unit: JG 26
- Commands: I./JG 26; II./JG 26
- Conflicts: See battles World War II: Invasion of Poland; Battle of the Netherlands; Battle of France; Battle of Britain; Dieppe Raid; Demyansk Pocket; Operation Büffel; Defense of the Reich
- Awards: Knight's Cross of the Iron Cross

Johannes "Hannes" Seifert (6 October 1915 – 25 November 1943) was a German Luftwaffe military aviator and fighter ace during World War II. He is credited with 57 aerial victories achieved in 439 combat missions. This figure includes 11 aerial victories on the Eastern Front, and further 46 victories over the Western Allies, including three four-engined bombers.

Born in Pinneberg, Seifert grew up in the Weimar Republic and Nazi Germany. He joined the military service in the Luftwaffe and was trained as a fighter pilot. Following flight training, he was posted to Jagdgeschwader 26 "Schlageter" (JG 26—26th Fighter Wing). Flying with this wing, Seifert claimed his first aerial victory on 10 May 1940 on the Western Front during the Battle of France fighter aircraft. He was made Staffelkapitän (squadron leader) of 3. Staffel (3rd squadron) of JG 26 in March 1940 and in July 1941, Gruppenkommandeur (group commander) of I. Gruppe of JG 26. Following his 36th aerial victory, he was awarded the Knight's Cross of the Iron Cross on 7 June 1942. In January 1943, his unit was posted to the Eastern Front. In September 1943, he was given command II. Gruppe of JG 26. He was killed in action in mid-air collision with a Lockheed P-38 Lightning on 25 November 1943 near Béthune, France.

== Early life and career ==
Johannes "Hannes" Seifert was born on 6 October 1915 at Pinneberg, Holstein. Jagdgeschwader 26 "Schlageter" (JG 26—26th Fighter Wing) was created on 1 May 1939 in Düsseldorf by renaming Jagdgeschwader 132 (JG 132—132nd Fighter Wing) and was commanded by Oberst Eduard Ritter von Schleich, a flying ace of World War I. Sources differ as to when exactly Seifert joined JG 26. According to Caldwell, Seifert was among the first pilots assigned to this unit following his training as a fighter pilot. (Note: Flight training in the Luftwaffe progressed through the levels A1, A2 and B1, B2, referred to as A/B flight training. A training included theoretical and practical training in aerobatics, navigation, long-distance flights and dead-stick landings. The B courses included high-altitude flights, instrument flights, night landings and training to handle the aircraft in difficult situations.) While Mathews and Foreman claim that Seifert first served in another unit flying the Messerschmitt Bf 110 heavy fighter during the Invasion of Poland before transferring to JG 26. His brother Gerhard was also a pilot with JG 26, shot down and killed in action on 4 February 1943.

== World War II ==
World War II in Europe began on Friday 1 September 1939 when German forces invaded Poland. On 1 March 1940, Seifert was appointed Staffelkapitän (squadron leader) of 3. Staffel (3rd squadron) of JG 26. This squadron was subordinated to I. Gruppe (1st group) under the command of Major Gotthard Handrick. Seifert claimed his first aerial victory on 10 May 1940 during the Battle of the Netherlands, as part of the Battle of France. The claim was made over a Royal Netherlands Air Force Fokker D.XXI fighter shot down near Rotterdam.

On 28 May, during the Battle of Dunkirk, I. Gruppe engaged in combat with Royal Air Force (RAF) Supermarine Spitfire fighters from the Hornchurch Wing over the English Channel east of Dunkirk. Fighter pilots from the Gruppe claimed six aerial victories in this encounter. This figure includes a Spitfire fighter claimed by Seifert between Dover and Ostend. Only one Spitfire was lost by the RAF, making a forced landing near Dunkirk on the beach. Two further Spitfires force landed in England. He claimed a No. 103 Squadron Fairey Battle light bomber north of Beauvais on 8 June. The following day, he shot down a Potez 63 bomber 10–15 kilometres (6.2–9.3 miles) southeast of Rouen. This claim took his total to four aerial victories, his last during the Battle of France as he was injured that day.

=== Group Commander ===
On 10 July 1941, the Gruppenkommandeur (group commander) of I. Gruppe, Hauptmann Rolf Pingel, was shot down over England and became a prisoner of war. The next day, Seifert succeeded Pingel in this capacity, a position he would hold for nearly two years. Seifert's command of 3. Staffel was passed on to Oberleutnant Walter Otte. Seifert claimed his first aerial victory during the Battle of Britain on 20 September. That day II. Gruppe of Lehrgeschwader 2 (LG 2—2nd Demonstration Wing) flew a fighter bomber attack on London. Supporting this attack, he claimed two Hawker Hurricane fighters from No. 253 Squadron over the Thames Estuary and Maidstone respectively.

In 1941 Fighter Command began the Circus offensive over Belgium and France, beginning on 10 January. JG 26 fought against these operations through the year to the final "Circus" on 8 November. Seifert claimed one of his first successes against "Circus" No. 19 on 23 June—he and Priller were the only claimants, while JG 26 suffered two crash-landed pilots. No. 616 and No. 485 (NZ) Squadron lost one Spitfire each, one pilot killed, the other captured, badly wounded. Combating "Circus" No. 45 on 11 July, Seifert claimed his 12th victory. JG 26 claimed seven in total while Jagdgeschwader 2 "Richthofen" (JG 2—2nd Fighter Wing) claimed three Spitfires. No. 11 Group reported five pilots missing. Against "Circus" No. 48, Seifert claimed another Spitfire as his wing claimed three, possibly four for one pilot killed—the RAF reported four missing. No. 54, No. 603, No. 611 and No. 616 Squadron were engaged with the third squadron losing three pilots. British reports state two of these collided while attacking a Bf 109. Seifert intercepted "Circus" No. 54 and 55 on 21 July, claiming a 15 Squadron Blenheim that had lost an engine to ground-fire and accounted for a Spitfire in the afternoon to inflate his tally to 15. Pilot Officer Johnnie Johnson, future Wing Leader, remarked that the "Circus" was "badly bounced [jumped]" and his formation did not see the enemy until they had opened fire. In the ensuing dogfight JG 26 claimed three for one loss—two Spitfires were lost and their pilots killed. One of them was Johnson's wingman. JG 26 claimed eight Spitfires from "Circus" No. 67 on 7 August. Seifert was among those successful pilots. Fighter Command reported four pilots missing and two wounded. The Germans suffered damage to two Bf 109s and one pilot was wounded. He claimed his 19th victory against "Circus" No. 82, in battle with 111 Squadron. "Circus" No. 95, on the morning of 17 September, cost Fighter Command six killed, two captured and three wounded and nine Spitfires. Seifert claimed his 20th victory—Paul Galland achieved a victory against No. 603 Squadron. Seifert accounted for a 92 Squadron Spitfire on 3 October in combat with "Circus" No. 105—one of three losses sustained by that unit on the day. "Circus" No. 107 was intercepted by JG 2 and JG 26. The former claimed five Spitfires and the latter two; Seifert being one of those pilots. Fighter Command reported two losses. Postwar analysis suggests JG 26 were responsible for the two Kenley Wing losses and the claims of JG 2 are not supported in British casualty records. On 8 November Fighter Command flew the last "Circus" of the year. No. 308 Squadron encountered Seifert's unit while on a bomber escort mission and lost one pilot killed in action; the Spitfire purportedly fell to Seifert.

Fighter Command continued with "Circus" offensives in 1942. On 1 June, Fighter Command planned three "Circus" missions to France. Defending against these missions, Seifert claimed a No. 111 Squadron Spitfire shot down in the vicinity of Ostend. According to Caldwell, this claim was his 35th aerial victory. Authors Prien, Stemmer, Rodeike and Bock consider this claim unconfirmed, creating a one aerial victory discrepancy between the two sources as of this date. Seifert was awarded the Knight's Cross of the Iron Cross (Ritterkreuz des Eisernen Kreuzes) on 7 June 1942 for 36 aerial victories. He was the only member of JG 26 to receive this distinction in 1942. On 31 July 1942, the RAF targeted the Abbeville-Drucat Airfield with "Circus" No. 201. Twelve Douglas A-20 Havoc bombers supported by the North Weald Wing had already bombed the airfield before they were intercepted over the Somme Estuary. Leading I. Gruppe, Seifert encountered the attack force west of Somme Estuary and shot down a No. 133 Squadron Spitfire 20 km (12 mi) west of Berck. During the Dieppe Raid on 19 August, Seifert claimed his 41st aerial victory 7 km (4.3 mi) west of Dieppe.

=== Eastern Front ===
In January 1943, the Luftwaffe planned to move JG 26 to the Eastern Front. The idea was to exchange JG 26 with Jagdgeschwader 54 (JG 54—54th Fighter Wing) which supported Army Group North. The style of combat between the two fronts was quite different and overall the experiment was not a success; I. Gruppe of JG 26 was the only Gruppe of JG 26 to serve in Russia. On 21 January, I. Gruppe left France and arrived in Heiligenbeil, present-day Mamonovo, on 27 January. There, the Gruppe received factory-new Fw 190 A-5 and A-4 aircraft. On 31 January, I. Gruppe moved to Riga and two days later to an airfield named Rielbitzi at Lake Ilmen. Seifert claimed his first aerial victory on the Eastern Front during the Battle of Demyansk on 16 February when he shot down an Ilyushin Il-2 ground-attack aircraft. On 23 February, Soviet forces attempted to cross Lake Ilmen by boat which were attacked by Fw 190s of the Stabsschwarm (headquarters flight). On a later mission that day, Seifert was credited with the destruction of an Il-2. Five days later, he claimed two aerial victories, shooting down a Bell P-39 Airacobra and Lavochkin-Gorbunov-Gudkov LaGG-3, two fighter aircraft. On 1 March, Army Group Centre began a series of local retreats codenamed Operation Büffel, eliminating the Rzhev Salient by 23 March.

On 5 March, Seifert led his Stabsschwarm on a mission south of Lake Ilmen. On this mission, he wanted to evaluate the performance of a new pilot, Feldwebel Karl Preeg, who was recently transferred to I. Gruppe and was shot down and killed on this mission. Later that day, Seifert claimed a Petlyakov Pe-2 bomber and two Il-2 ground-attack aircraft destroyed. On 14 March, I. Gruppe moved to an airfield at Dno, southwest of Rielbitzi and west of Staraya Russa. That day, Seifert claimed a Pe-2 bomber destroyed, his 50th aerial victory. Two days later, he claimed an Il-2 ground-attack aircraft. On 12 May, I. Gruppe relocated to Shatalovka and then 50 kilometres (31 miles) east to Osinovka. On the transfer flight, Seifert shot down another Il-2 ground-attack aircraft. The next day, he claimed his 53rd and last aerial victory on the Eastern Front when he shot down a Mikoyan-Gurevich MiG-3 fighter aircraft.

On 20 May 1943, Seifert had to leave his command of I. Gruppe when transferred to a staff position with the Luftwaffe detachment of the Reichsluftfahrtministerium (RLM—Ministry of Aviation) in Bulgaria. Unknown to Seifert, his mother had invoked the 'last surviving son' ruling as his younger brother, Gerhard, had been killed in action, and was thus allowed to be removed from active combat duties. Hauptmann Fritz Losigkeit temporarily succeeded him as commander of I. Gruppe.

=== Western Front and death ===
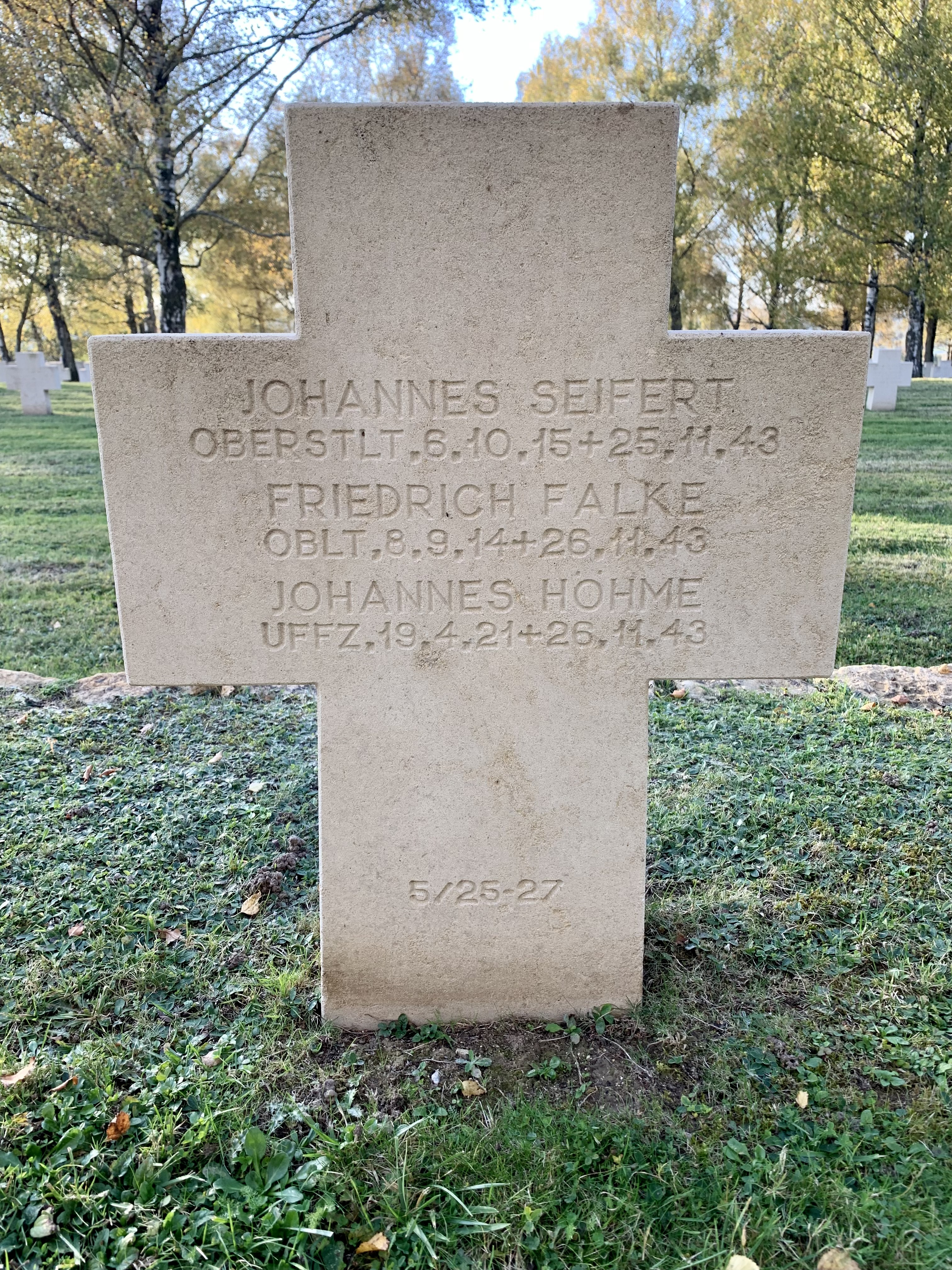
His grave at the Bourdon German war cemetery.

Seifert personally appealed to Adolf Galland, the General der Jagdflieger (general of the fighter force) and his former Geschwaderkommodore (wing commander) of JG 26, to be placed on active duty. In consequence, his tour with the RLM ended and he returned to France in September 1943 and was appointed Gruppenkommandeur II. Gruppe of JG 26, replacing Hauptmann Johannes Naumann in this capacity. Naumann had briefly led II. Gruppe following the death of its previous commander Major Wilhelm-Ferdinand Galland, brother of Adolf Galland, on 17 August. Seifert took command of the Gruppe on 9 September, then based at Beauvais–Tillé Airfield. At the time of his posting to II. Gruppe, the Western Allies were executing Operation Cockade, a series of deception operations alleviate German pressure on operations in Sicily and on the Soviets on the Eastern Front. The idea behind Cockade was to force the Luftwaffe into massive air battles with the RAF and United States Army Air Forces (USAAF) VIII Bomber Command that would give the Allies air superiority over Western Europe. As part of this operation, Martin B-26 Marauder bombers attacked Beauvais–Tillé Airfield on 23 September. In defense of this attack, Seifert claimed an escorting Spitfire fighter from the No. 308 Polish Fighter Squadron shot down.

On 10 October, VIII Bomber Command targeted Münster with 274 Boeing B-17 Flying Fortress bombers. Leading his II. Gruppe from Rheine Airfield, Seifert claimed a B-17 shot down northeast of Rheine. Four days later, during the second Schweinfurt raid, Seifert shot down a B-17 bomber from the 305th Bombardment Group, which lost 13 of its 16 aircraft, near Maastricht. On 25 November 1943, Seifert led 6. and 8. Staffel of JG 26 against the USAAF Lockheed P-38 Lightning fighters of the 55th Fighter Group over Lille. During combat, Seifert's Fw 190 A-6 (Werknummer 470006—factory number) collided with a P-38, and crashed near La Couture, 5 km (3.1 mi) south of Estaires, killing both pilots. The American pilot, Lieutenant Manuel Aldecoa bailed out but his parachute had failed to deploy properly and he fell to his death. Seifert however, never attempted to leave his Fw 190, his body was recovered from the wreckage. Posthumously, he was promoted to the rank of Oberstleutnant (lieutenant colonel).

== Summary of career ==
=== Aerial victory claims ===
According to Obermaier, Seifert was credited with 57 aerial victories claimed in 439 combat missions. Of his 57 aerial victories, 46 were claimed over the Western Front, including three four-engined bombers, and 11 victories over the Eastern Front. Mathews and Foreman, authors of Luftwaffe Aces — Biographies and Victory Claims, researched the German Federal Archives and found records for 55 aerial victory claims, plus two further unconfirmed claims. This figure includes 11 aerial victories on the Eastern Front and 44 over the Western Allies, including two four-engined bombers.

Victory claims were logged to a map-reference (PQ = Planquadrat), for example "PQ 35 Ost 1824". The Luftwaffe grid map (Jägermeldenetz) covered all of Europe, western Russia and North Africa and was composed of rectangles measuring 15 minutes of latitude by 30 minutes of longitude, an area of about 360 square miles (930 km^{2}). These sectors were then subdivided into 36 smaller units to give a location area 3 km × 4 km (1.9 mi × 2.5 mi) in size.

Chronicle of aerial victories
This and the – (dash) indicates unconfirmed aerial victory claims for which Seifert did not receive credit. This and the ? (question mark) indicates information discrepancies listed by Caldwell, Prien, Stemmer, Rodeike, Bock, Mathews and Foreman.
Claim	Date	Time	Type	Location	Claim	Date	Time	Type	Location
– 3. Staffel of Jagdgeschwader 26 "Schlageter" – Battle of France — 10 May – 25 June 1940
1	10 May 1940	10:15	D.XXI	southeast of Rotterdam	3? (Note: According to Mathews and Foreman this claim is unconfirmed.)	8 June 1940	—	Battle	north of Beauvais
2	28 May 1940	10:40? (Note: According to Mathews and Foreman claimed at 10:45.)	Spitfire	20 km (12 mi) southwest of Ostend	4	9 June 1940	11:10	Potez 63	10–15 km (6.2–9.3 mi) southeast of Rouen
– 3. Staffel of Jagdgeschwader 26 "Schlageter" – Action at the Channel and over England — 26 June 1940 – 21 June 1941
5	20 September 1940	12:25	Hurricane	Thames Estuary	8	13 November 1940	12:00? (Note: According to Mathews and Foreman claimed at 16:00.)	Hurricane	south of Folkestone
6	20 September 1940	12:37	Hurricane	Maidstone	9	11 June 1941	13:30	Hurricane	mid-English Channel
7	5 November 1940	17:15	Hurricane	Thames Estuary					
– 3. Staffel of Jagdgeschwader 26 "Schlageter" – On the Western Front — 22 June – 10 July 1941
10	23 June 1941	13:50	Spitfire	Samer	11	4 July 1941	15:20	Spitfire	6 km (3.7 mi) north of Béthune
– Stab I. Gruppe of Jagdgeschwader 26 "Schlageter" – On the Western Front — 11 July – 31 December 1941
12	11 July 1941	15:05	Spitfire	east of Wimereux	19	19 August 1941	19:40	Spitfire	Cassel
13	14 July 1941	10:30	Spitfire	south of Dunkirk	20	17 September 1941	15:30	Spitfire	north of Hazebrouck
14	21 July 1941	08:40	Stirling? (Note: According to Mathews and Foreman claimed as a Supermarine Spitfire.)	English Channel	21	3 October 1941	15:37? (Note: According to Mathews and Foreman claimed at 15:47.)	Spitfire	20 km (12 mi) northwest of Ostend
15	21 July 1941	20:25? (Note: According to Caldwell, Mathews and Foreman claimed at 08:25.)	Spitfire	southwest of Ypres	22	12 October 1941	13:20	Spitfire	Berck
16	7 August 1941	11:25	Spitfire	Gravelines	23	8 November 1941	13:05	Spitfire	northwest of Dunkirk
17	12 August 1941	13:10? (Note: According to Caldwell claimed at 13:00.)	Blenheim	southeast of Vlissingen	24	8 December 1941	13:20? (Note: According to Mathews and Foreman claimed at 13:02.)	Spitfire	Le Touquet
18	19 August 1941	11:45	Spitfire	Gravelines					
– Stab I. Gruppe of Jagdgeschwader 26 "Schlageter" – On the Western Front — 1 January – 31 December 1942
25	13 March 1942	16:15	Spitfire	southwest of Dunkirk	34	17 May 1942	11:40	Spitfire	2 km (1.2 mi) off Wissant
26	24 March 1942	17:10	Spitfire	12 km (7.5 mi) west of Boulogne	— (Note: According to Caldwell, this claim is listed as his 35th aerial victory.)	1 June 1942	13:45	Spitfire	15 km (9.3 mi) north-northwest of Ostend
27	4 April 1942	11:40	Spitfire	south of Gravelines	35	2 June 1942	11:25	Spitfire	5 km (3.1 mi) south of Saint-Valery
28	12 April 1942	13:45? (Note: According to Caldwell claimed at 13:35.)	Spitfire	Boulogne/Saint-Omer	36	30 July 1942	17:45	Spitfire? (Note: According to Mathews and Foreman claimed as a "Cobra".)	Boulogne
29	24 April 1942	15:05? (Note: According to Caldwell claimed at 15:02.)	Spitfire	east of Calais	37	30 July 1942	17:47? (Note: According to Mathews and Foreman claimed at 17:55.)	Spitfire?	vicinity of Dungeness; Marquise-Boulogne
30	25 April 1942	16:40	Spitfire	10 km (6.2 mi) west of Berck	38	30 July 1942	19:18	Spitfire	northwest of Saint-Omer
31	27 April 1942	16:00? (Note: According to Caldwell claimed at 15:50.)	Boston	Bourbourg	39	31 July 1942	15:22? (Note: According to Mathews and Foreman claimed at 15:25.)	Spitfire	20 km (12 mi) west of Berck
32	28 April 1942	11:40? (Note: According to Caldwell claimed at 11:35.)	Spitfire	3 km (1.9 mi) west of Gravelines	40	19 August 1942	14:00	Spitfire	7 km (4.3 mi) west of Dieppe
33	5 May 1942	15:42? (Note: According to Caldwell claimed at 15:40.)	Spitfire	Bailleul	41	4 December 1942	14:52	Spitfire	south of Calais
– Stab I. Gruppe of Jagdgeschwader 26 "Schlageter" – On the Eastern Front — 2 February – 31 May 1943
42	16 February 1943	14:10	Il-2	8 km (5.0 mi) southeast of Adler 7	48	5 March 1943	13:54	Il-2	PQ 35 Ost 1824
43	23 February 1943	11:10	Il-2	PQ 35 Ost 1843	49	14 March 1943	14:50	Pe-2	PQ 35 Ost 18242; PQ 18282
44	28 February 1943	15:00	P-39	PQ 35 Ost 18412	50	16 March 1943	16:30	Il-2	PQ 35 Ost 18211
45	28 February 1943	15:01	La-5	PQ 35 Ost 1835	51	12 May 1943	11:35	Il-2	PQ 35 Ost 36612
46	5 March 1943	13:40	Pe-2	PQ 35 Ost 1822	52	13 May 1943	14:05	MiG-3	PQ 35 Ost 4556-4564
47	5 March 1943	13:53	Il-2	PQ 35 Ost 1815; PQ 1816					
– Stab II. Gruppe of Jagdgeschwader 26 "Schlageter" – On the Western Front — 9 September – 25 November 1943
53	23 September 1943	17:10	Spitfire	Le Fresne	55	14 October 1943	13:34? (Note: According to Caldwell claimed at 13:32. According to Mathews and Foreman claimed at 13:40.)	B-17	2 km (1.2 mi) northwest of Maastricht
54	10 October 1943	15:30	B-17	northeast of Rheine	56	25 November 1943	13:21	P-38	Cuinchy, near Béthune

=== Awards ===
- Iron Cross (1939) 2nd and 1st Class
- Honor Goblet of the Luftwaffe (30 December 1940)
- German Cross in Gold on 25 February 1942 as Hauptmann in the I./Jagdgeschwader 26
- Knight's Cross of the Iron Cross on 7 June 1942 as Hauptmann and Gruppenkommandeur of the I./Jagdgeschwader 26 "Schlageter"
