= Jagdgeschwader 26 =

German fighter-wing of World War II

- JG 26 emblem
- Active: 15 March 1937 – 8 May 1945
- Country: Nazi Germany
- Branch: Luftwaffe
- Type: Fighter Aircraft
- Role: Air superiority Fighter bomber
- Size: Wing
- Nicknames: Schlageter; Abbeville Boys
- Patron: Albert Leo Schlageter

Commanders
- Notable commanders: Adolf Galland; Josef Priller

Jagdgeschwader 26 (JG 26) Schlageter was a German fighter-wing of World War II. It was named after Albert Leo Schlageter, a World War I veteran, Freikorps member, and posthumous Nazi martyr, arrested and executed by the French for sabotage in 1923. The wing fought predominantly against the Western Allies.

Formed in May 1939, JG 26 spent the Phoney War period guarding Germany's western borders following the German invasion of Poland and the outbreak of World War II. In May and June 1940 it served in the Battle of Belgium and Battle of France. From July 1940 it operated over England in the Battle of Britain under the command of Adolf Galland, future General der Jagdflieger. JG 26 remained in France and Belgium fighting against the RAF Fighter Command Circus offensive in 1941 and 1942, with considerable tactical success. In 1943 it faced the USAAF Eighth Air Force, and along with the rest of the Luftwaffe fighter force, was worn down over Western Europe combating the Combined Bomber Offensive in Defence of the Reich. In 1944, JG 26 resisted the Normandy landings and served as a "tactical" or frontline unit during Operation Market Garden and Battle of the Bulge. It continued to fight up to the unconditional surrender of Wehrmacht forces in Western Europe on 8 May 1945.

Elements of JG 26 served in other theatres. A single staffel (squadron) served in the North African Campaign and Battle of the Mediterranean. One gruppe (group) and a single staffel, fought on the Eastern Front from January to June 1943. A planned move in full to the Soviet Union did not materialise. JG 26 was well known by Allied air forces. The Royal Air Force (RAF) called the Joachim Müncheberg-led II. Gruppe the "Abbeville Boys" after their home base.

== Organisation ==
A Luftwaffe Geschwader (wing formation) was the largest homogenous flying formation. It typically was made up of three groups (gruppen). Each group contained approximately 30 to 40 aircraft in three squadrons (staffeln). A Jagdgeschwader could field 90 to 120 fighter aircraft. In some cases a wing could be given a fourth gruppe. Each wing had a Geschwaderkommodore (wing commander) supported by three Gruppenkommandeur (Group Commanders). Each squadron was commanded by a Staffelkapitän (squadron leader). The staffel contained approximately 12 to 15 aircraft. The identification in records was different depending on the type of formation. A gruppe was referred to in roman numerals, for example I./JG 26, while staffeln were described with their number (1./JG 26). The wing could be subordinated to a Fliegerkorps, Fliegerdivision or Jagddivision (Flying Corps, Division and Fighter Division) all of which were subordinated to Luftflotten (Air Fleets). The use of Fliegerdivision became redundant and the description Fliegerkorps supplanted it until the use of Jagddivision later in the war.

=== Formation ===
Jagdgeschwader 26 was one of the earliest fighter units of the Luftwaffe. Its creation began in early 1937. A plan dated 14 March 1936 by Hermann Göring, at the time Reichsminister der Luftfahrt (Minister of Aviation) and Oberbefehlshaber der Luftwaffe (Commander in Chief of the Luftwaffe), foresaw the creation of two light fighter groups in Luftkreis IV, a territorial Luftwaffe unit with its headquarters in Münster. Göring had planned for these two groups, initially organized under the designation Jagdgeschwader 234 (JG 234–234th Fighter Wing), to become operational on 1 April 1937.

I. Gruppe of JG 234 was created from the redesignation of III. Gruppe of Jagdgeschwader 134 on 15 March 1937 at Cologne Butzweilerhof Airfield. Its first commander was Hauptmann Walter Grabmann, who handed over command to Major Gotthard Handrick on 11 September 1938. The Gruppe was initially referred to I.(leichte Jäger) Gruppe and was equipped with the Heinkel He 51 B and started receiving the first Messerschmitt Bf 109 B series in May 1938. In parallel, II. Gruppe of JG 234 was formed in Düsseldorf. This Gruppe had numerous commanders during its creation phase, Major Werner Rentsch (15 March – May 1937), Major Werner Nielsen (May – 31 July 1937), Oberstleutnant Eduard Ritter von Schleich (1 August 1937 – 30 September 1938), Hauptmann Werner Palm (1 October 1938 – 27 June 1939) and Hauptmann Herwig Knüppel, who took command on 28 June 1939.

The Geschwaderstab (headquarters unit) was formed on 1 November 1938 in Düsseldorf and placed under the command of Oberst Eduard Ritter von Schleich. On this day, the Geschwader was renamed to Jagdgeschwader 132 (JG 132–132nd Fighter Wing) and was subordinated to Luftgaukommando IV (Air District Command). Also, on this day, I. and II. Gruppe of JG 234 were placed under the command of JG 132 and were then referred to as I. and II. Gruppe of JG 132. The Geschwaderstab was equipped with the Bf 109 D-1. On 8 December 1938, JG 132 was given the unit name "Schlageter", named after Albert Leo Schlageter. Schlageter was former member of the Freikorps who was executed by the French for sabotage and then became a martyr cultivated by the Nazi Party.

On 1 May 1939, the unit was named Jagdgeschwader 26 "Schlageter". One practical result of being a "named" unit was that for propaganda, if not necessarily operational, reasons, the wing was always among the first to receive new equipment; by January 1939 the Jagdgeschwader had received the newer Bf 109 E-1 which was highest performing fighter aircraft in the world at the time. I. Gruppe was commanded by Gotthard Handrick. Handrick served in Jagdgruppe 88 (J/88), Condor Legion, during the Spanish Civil War. Hauptmann Werner Palm commanded II. Gruppe, while III. Gruppe, formed 23 days into the war, was placed under Major Ernst Freiherr von Berg.

== World War II ==
On 25 August 1939, I. Gruppe was ordered from Cologne to Bonn-Odendorf, across the Rhine in the Eifel while II. Gruppe moved from Düsseldorf to Bönninghardt. On 1 September 1939, the German Wehrmacht began the Invasion of Poland, beginning World War II. JG 26 was ordered to protect the western German border and industrial regions. Pilots spent time patrolling the airspace, in training or waiting at readiness in cockpits. The wing suffered its first fatality when an Unteroffizier pilot, Josef Schubauer, 2. Staffel, was killed in an accident. 10. Staffel became a night fighter unit under the command of Johannes Steinhoff, but was equipped with obsolete Bf 109 Ds and Arado Ar 68 fighters. 7., 8. and 9. Staffel were formed to staff the gruppe; Gerhard Schöpfel was the first leader of 9./JG 26. JG 26 claimed a first victory on 28 September, when a Curtiss P-36 Hawk from Groupe de Chasse II/5 encountered 2./JG 26 escorting a Henschel Hs 126 reconnaissance aircraft. The battle ended in the two Bf 109s being brought down with no loss to the French Air Force unit. By 30 September 1939, III. Gruppe had received its full complement of Bf 109s. The wing now had 129 day fighters, with fourteen Bf 109 Ds and six Ar 68s in the night fighter staffel. Walter Kienitz was replaced as III. Gruppe commander by Major Ernst Freiherr von Berg on 31 October, while on 7 November Joachim Müncheberg claimed the last victory during the "Phoney War" over a No. 56 Squadron RAF Bristol Blenheim bomber. The night fighter unit 10.(Nacht)/JG 26 fought in the Battle of the Heligoland Bight under Carl-Alfred Schumacher. Steinhoff was also in the battle; the German unit claimed six (three confirmed) for one pilot drowned. On New Years Day 1940, JG 26 began replacing the Bf 109 E-1 with the E-3, which had more powerful MG FF cannon armament in the wings, though not all staffeln had replaced the E-1 until autumn, 1940. On 10 February 1940 I. Gruppe was assigned to Jagdgeschwader 51 (JG 51—51st Fighter Wing) but remained under JG 26 administration. It did not return to JG 26 until June 1940. To maintain it as a three gruppen wing, JG 26 took operational control of gruppen from other wings. From 1 September 1939 to 9 May 1940, JG 26 lost one pilot killed in action, one interned in the Netherlands, three killed in accidents and one wounded in action. The pilots were credited with four confirmed and four unconfirmed victories.

=== France and the Low Countries ===
JG 26 was assigned to Jagdfliegerführer 2, a fighter command within Luftflotte 2. JG 26 was tasked with supporting Army Group B in the Battle of the Netherlands and Battle of Belgium, which encouraged the French Army and British Army into the Low Countries while Army Group A outflanked them through lower Belgium and Luxembourg, north of the Maginot Line. JG 51, Jagdgeschwader 27 (JG 27—27th Fighter Wing) and Zerstörergeschwader 26 (ZG 26—26th Destroyer Wing) provided air superiority support. II. and III. Gruppen operated over the Netherlands in the first days, with the attached III. Gruppe of Jagdgeschwader 3 (JG 3—3rd Fighter Wing). I. Gruppe joined them, under the command of JG 51. Stab/JG 26 had four Bf 109s on strength (three operational), I. Gruppe 44 (35), II. Gruppe 47 (36) and III. Gruppe 42 (22), based at Dortmund, Bonninghardt, Dortmund and Essen respectively.

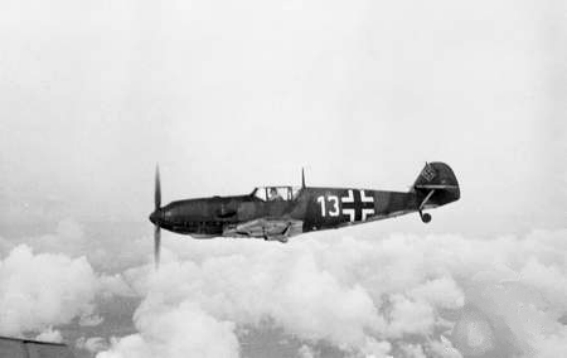
Bf 109 E, JG 1, similar to those flown by JG 26 in 1940

Fall Gelb opened on 10 May 1940. JG 26 flew cover for the invasion of the Netherlands and Battle of the Hague. JG 26 operated in the vicinity of Amsterdam. One Bf 109 was lost in combat with a Fokker D.XXI, several others were reported damaged. Eight Dutch aircraft, some from 2-1 and 1–2, Java, Royal Dutch Air Force, were claimed shot down. The Allied armies enacted their Dyle Plan into Belgium on 11 May, screened by three groups of French fighters, four Hawker Hurricane squadrons from the RAF Advanced Air Striking Force, supported by elements of No. 11 Group RAF in England. III. Gruppe claimed five P-36s from GC I/4 without loss; the French lost their commander and another killed, one captured, two wounded and several damaged fighters. JG 26 pilots were given credit for eight destroyed near Antwerp. The following day, no reported contact was made with any enemy aircraft. Stab, III. Gruppe and III./JG 3 moved near the Dutch border at Mönchengladbach and II. Gruppe to Uerdingen. RAF Fighter Command made contact with the Luftwaffe for the first time on 13 May, against JG 26. Supermarine Spitfires from No. 66 Squadron RAF and Boulton Paul Defiants from No. 264 Squadron RAF. Seven Spitfires and one Defiant were claimed; one Spitfire and five Defiants were lost. Two Dutch and two French aircraft, one from GC III/3, were also claimed in the Rotterdam and Dordrecht areas. The cost was to 1./JG 26, which suffered two pilots killed and another temporarily captured. On 14 May, JG 26 was busy supporting German advances at the Battle of Gembloux. III. Gruppe engaged in air combat destroying a section of four Hurricanes from No. 504 Squadron RAF as the decisive Battle of Sedan occurred further south. The Dutch capitulated that day, permitting I. Gruppe to join the main battle. The group moved to Eindhoven a day later. Over the 15–17 May a further eight victory claims were granted to JG 26 pilots in battles over Lille, Seclin and Tournai, Mons and Overijse. From 18 May, it supported Army Group A's drive to the English Channel. II. Gruppe was credited with 12 enemy aircraft on the day in the Cambrai Douai area. Two out of six claims were confirmed the following day but lost commanding officer Herwig Knüppel killed. Two fighters from No. 253 Squadron RAF are known to have fallen in combat with JG 26. III. Gruppe moved to Beauvechain near Brussels while the recently attached III./JG 27 moved to Sint Truiden. I. Gruppe, under JG 51, transferred to Antwerp 23 May.

The breakthrough at Sedan on 13 May permitted the Panzer Divisions to reach the English Channel on 20 May. On 14 May, the French and AASF bombers sent strong bomber formations against the bridges at Sedan to prevent the German crossings. They suffered heavy losses, in what became known as "the day of the fighters" in the Luftwaffe. II. Gruppe located to Neerhespen-Landed on 18 May, but had moved further forward to operate over Dunkirk from 24 May, as the battle for the port began against the encircled Allied armies. The Luftwaffe fighter wings usually patrolled in gruppe strength of 40 aircraft, meeting squadrons of RAF fighters numbering only a dozen; the largest tactical unit at the time. On this day II. Gruppe took advantage and destroyed three No. 74 Squadron RAF Spitfires attacking German bombers without loss. The following day, Stab/JG 26, with an attached gruppe from II. Gruppe of Jagdgeschwader 2 (JG 2—2nd Fighter Wing) moved to Quevaucamps, northwest of Mons, Belgium, some distance from the Channel ports. III./JG 26 moved to Chievres as the attached III./JG 3 moved to Mauriaux. From 24 to 28 May, JG 26 pilots were credited with 13 victories with six unconfirmed. Their opponents on the last date were from 213, 229 and 242.The following morning Fighter Command fielded the largest single patrol when Hurricanes from 229 and 242 Squadrons, covered by Spitfires from 64 and 610. The British formations were too far apart which allowed two gruppen of JG 26 and III./JG 3 to attack them from higher altitudes. In thirty minutes, ten British fighters were shot down while the Junkers Ju 87 "Stukas" made a successful attack on Dunkirk shipping. II./JG 27 moved to Brussels on 30 May and by the following morning, JG 26 controlled all three of its gruppen plus three attached gruppen making it a six-group wing. On 31 May, JG 26 pilots were given credit for nine fighters destroyed; since the 10 May seven of the wings pilots had been killed, seven wounded and four captured (one later released). All but three fell in aerial combat. The penultimate day of combat over Dunkirk on 1 June saw JG 26 claim five for no loss; within twenty four hours seven claims were granted after a large air battle over Dunkirk. Fighter Command reported the loss of 18 in total on the first and 11 on the second in combat with fighter, heavy fighter and bomber formations.

Fall Gelb ended, and the final phase of the Battle of France began with Fall Rot. On 3 June the attached gruppen were detached, leaving JG 26 with its own gruppen. On this date all three flew as fighter escort for Operation Paula, a strategic bombing operation against 242 airfields, aircraft factories and industrial centres. Stab, I. and II. Gruppen JG 26 claimed three French fighters for one loss; the pilot was released in June. The French had concentrated their fighter aircraft power around the capital but targets proved elusive for the Germans. The operation was a failure militarily. The entire wing moved to an airfield near Le Touquet to support Army Group B and its advance across the Somme from 4 June. The following morning Hauptmann Adolf Galland took command of III. Gruppe from JG 26. The appointment would prove to be a significant event in the geschwader history. On 7 June Fighter Command sent meagre reinforcements to Rouen. 43 and 601 were engaged and lost four of their number on the way in, and on the return flight lost three Hurricanes (pilots safe) to III./JG 26 on the way out. It cost the Germans two pilots killed and one wounded. From the 3 to 7 June only three of the 10 claims submitted by JG 26 were accepted by the Luftwaffe. Galland's command and I. Gruppe flew escort missions on the 8 June. Three of Galland's pilots were lost; two were killed and a third, Klaus Mietusch, a future senior officer, survived a crash behind French lines, was shot by a French civilian and captured. He returned to Germany after his release in June. Only four from 10 claims were permitted to stand. Near Rouen on the 9th, III. Gruppe lost one Bf 109 but accounted for seven Caudron C.714s from GC I/145; the Polish unit lost three men killed. JG 26 began moving to airfields near Paris on 13 June (it fell on 14 June). Of the 13 claims made over five days from 9 to 14 June, all were credited and all but four were against British opponents. I. Gruppe moved to Saint-Remy-sous-Barbuise, near Paris on 17 June, and the rest to Vélizy – Villacoublay Air Base. Handrick was given command of JG 26 on 24 June, two days after the Armistice of 22 June 1940. From 1 to 26 June cost JG 26 10 killed in action, two killed in accidents, four temporarily captured and six wounded. JG 26 were credited with the destruction of 160 Allied aircraft in the campaign. III. Gruppe was transferred to Doberitz to protect the Berlin victory celebration.

=== Battle of Britain ===
The capitulation of the Netherlands, Belgium, France, Denmark and Norway in mid-1940 left the United Kingdom facing hostile coastlines from Norway to the Bay of Biscay. In the west, the Battle of the Atlantic was taking place. Winston Churchill rejected Adolf Hitler's overtures for a peace settlement and the Nazi leadership resolved to invade Britain as a last resort. Operation Sea Lion could not begin until air superiority over the Channel and Southern England was achieved, at the least. Oberkommando der Luftwaffe ordered attacks on British shipping in the English Channel as a prelude to a full-scale offensive against Fighter Command and its infrastructure, in July 1940. The intention was to draw out Fighter Commandand deplete it in dogfights over the Channel while blocking the Channel to British shipping. The Germans referred to this phase, of what became the Battle of Britain, as the Kanalkampf.

Stab and I. Gruppe returned to France on 15 July at Audembert, near Calais, a former grain field. It redeployed to Jagdfliegerführer 2 once again under the command of Luftflotte 2, though the date they became operational is unknown. Some ground crews did not reach France until August. Re-equipment with the more heavily armed and armoured Bf 109 E-4 was incomplete and many E-1s remained on charge. The pilots of JG 26 believed that a campaign against the United Kingdom would end in a swift victory. II. and III. Gruppen were based at Marquise, Pas-de-Calais and Caffiers respectively. II. Gruppe led by Karl Ebbighausen had 35 Bf 109s operational from 39 and Galland 38 from 40 serviceable. All four aircraft of the Stabstaffel Bf 109s were combat ready and I. Gruppe had 34 from 38 operational.

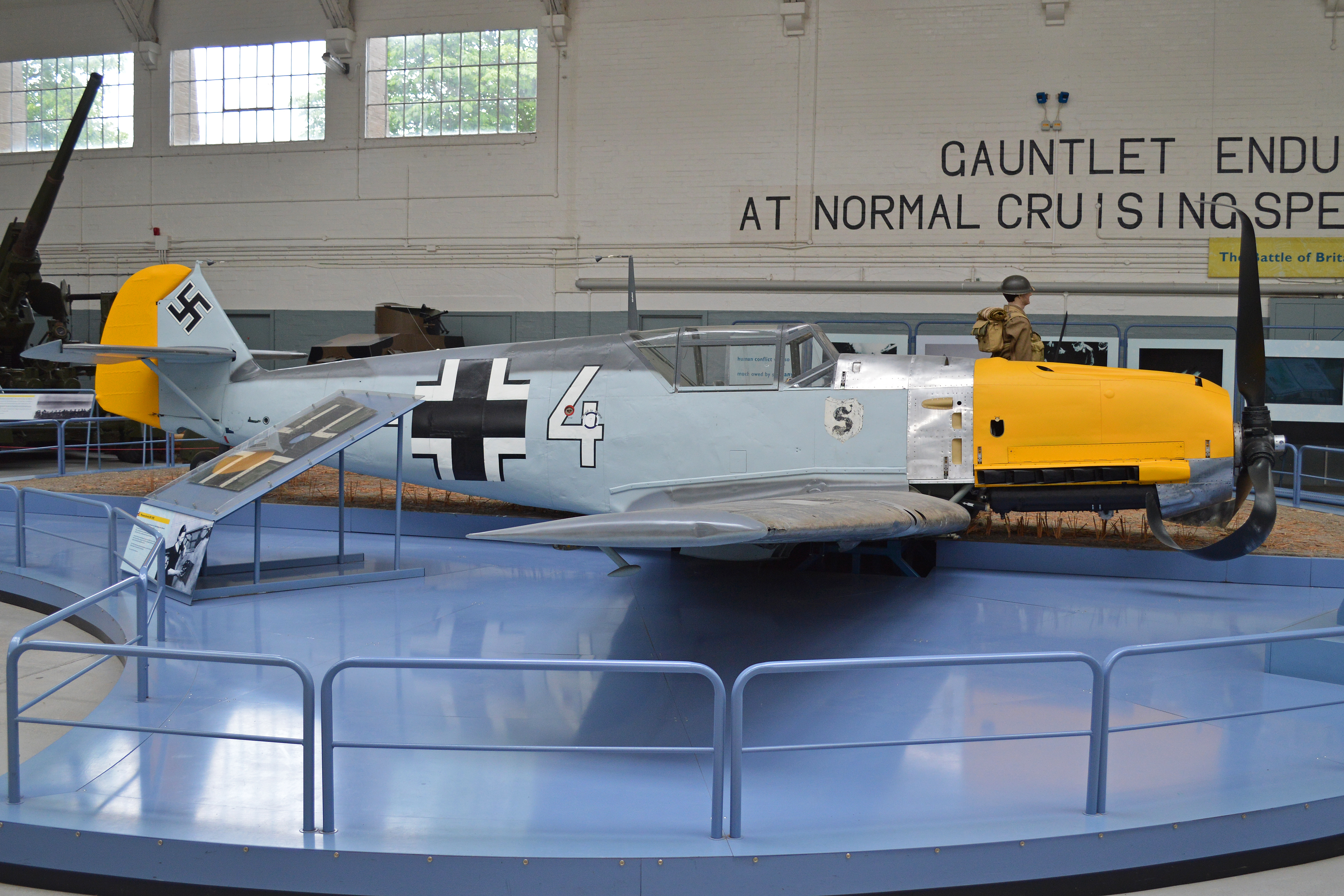
JG 26 Bf 109 E-3, displayed at the Imperial War Museum Duxford.

JG 26 took part in its first action on 24 July and lost two pilots. Oberleutnant Werner Bartels, technical officer, was captured wounded but repatriated in a prisoner-exchange in 1943 and later worked on the Messerschmitt Me 262 project. The losses came as a shock and reinforced Galland's view that the campaign would not be easy. Four victory claims were accepted in July for three men killed and one captured. The Channel battles continued into August. On day one, Galland was awarded the Knight's Cross of the Iron Cross by Albert Kesselring and JG 26 was stood down for a week until sufficient strength could be built for Adlertag (Eagle Day).

From 1 to 11 August, two Bf 109s were lost and one pilot was killed; three claims were granted to III. Gruppe. In the action of 8 August above Convoy Peewi the gruppe and II./JG 51 claiming eight Spitfires (three were lost). The Germans suffered one casualty and the British claimed nine; JG 26 were credited with two and one unconfirmed. Fighter Command credited JG 51 with two of the losses and JG 26 just one. On 12 August, II. Gruppe claimed a first victory of the battle, while the wing destroyed nine fighters for one pilot killed and another captured.

Adlertag began on 13 August and cost JG 26 one fighter, though the attacks were a failure. Apparently a dozen Bf 109s from II. Gruppe got lost and force-landed in France after running out of fuel. On 14 August a newcomer pilot was wounded and captured but was repatriated in 1943 to serve in the ground staff. The battle involved over 200 aircraft, as all three gruppen escorted Ju 87s from II./StG 1 and IV./LG 1. II. Gruppe suffered on loss and claimed two in action with 32 Squadron; III. Gruppe engaged 615 Squadron and claimed six (actual losses were three). JG 26 fought in the actions on 15 August, called Black Thursday in the Luftwaffe due to the severity of the losses.

Keith Park, Air Officer Commanding 11 Group, ignored powerful fighter patrols intended to clear the sky before the bombers. Galland's Gruppe ran into 64 Squadron and depleted their fuel and ammunition and were not in a position to assist the Dornier Do 17s of Kampfgeschwader 2 (KG 2—2nd Bomber Wing). Without fighter escorts the bombers were forced to abandon the mission. KG 3, escorted by other fighter units damaged the airfields at Rochester and RAF Hornchurch; JG 26 made 13 claims but 8 remained unconfirmed. Twenty four hours later, Ebbighausen was killed in action with 266 Squadron, though the RAF Squadron was destroyed (losing six)<!Is this the squadron destroyed or a flight?--> when an unidentified Bf 109 unit intervened. JG 26 served in the 18 August battles now known as The Hardest Day, claiming nine for the loss of two pilots.

Both sides were grounded by poor weather for several days and on 22 August 1940, Hermann Göring, commander-in-chief of the Luftwaffe, dissatisfied with his wing commanders and feeling that younger and more aggressive leaders were needed for the battle, replaced eight Geschwaderkommodore. Handrick was replaced by Galland who agreed with Göring that the sole measure of success in a fighter leader was the number of aircraft shot down. Galland began weeding out those he deemed unfit and promoting those he saw as able; Schöpfel and Müncheberg were among those promoted to command Staffeln. From 22 to 30 August, JG 26 were credited with 23 fighters for two killed, two captured and one wounded. On the final day of August, 15 fighters were destroyed for two killed and three captured. In the first week of September, the battles against the airfields died down, as OKL changed tactics. In the first six days, JG 26 were credited with 21 fighters destroyed for the loss of two dead and three prisoners. With Hitler's approval, the Luftwaffe began to attack military objectives in London.

The climax of the campaign was later called Battle of Britain Day. JG 26 fought in the main dogfights, accounting for three fighters according to post-war research. From 7 September, German fighter units were ordered to fly as close escort, which brought Galland into dispute with Göring whose loss of confidence in the fighter arm had as much to do with the switch of strategy to bombing London. To Göring the fighter patrols, free of bomber escort, had not been as successful as the pilots claimed. Henceforth, fighter units no longer had free rein to exploit the qualities of the Bf 109 in flying high and making diving attacks. Flying closer to the bombers forced the German fighters to engage in manoeuvre battles with the Spitfire, which was superior to the Bf 109 in this respect due to its lighter wing loading. In a much-publicised conversation, Galland claimed that in a meeting with Göring and Werner Mölders he requested a Spitfire for his wing if that was how they were to fight. Galland had to settle for some Bf 109 E-4/Ns, JG 26 being the only unit to fly the type. The Daimler-Benz DB 601N required 96 Octane fuel rather than the standard 87 Octane and was in short supply; the DB 601N had a short production run. The decision to attack London placed the Bf 109 at the limit of its range. Galland remarked that a drop tank could have increased flying time by 30 or 40 minutes.

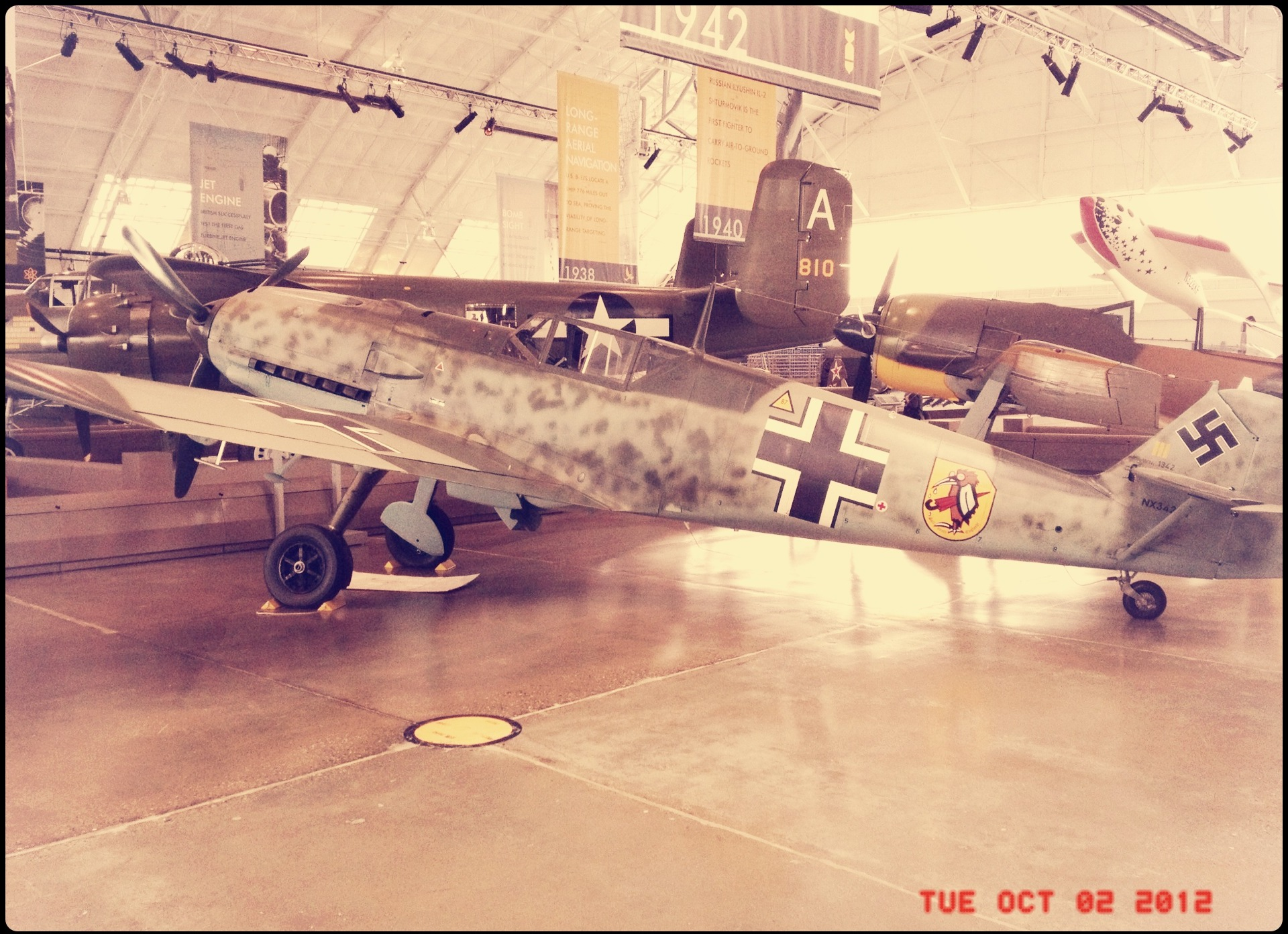
Bf 109 E-3; JG 26 operated the E-1, 3 and 4 in 1940. It was more heavily armed than the E-1. Note the 87 octane triangle on the fuselage

In September tiredness and a decline in morale began to affect the fighter pilots. The Luftwaffe lacked sufficient pilots and aircraft to maintain a constant presence over England. Commanders demanded three to four sorties per day by the most experienced men. By the end of September, Galland noticed that "the stamina of the superbly trained and experienced original [cadre of pilots] was down to a point where operational efficiency was being impaired". Göring's interference with tactics without regard for the situation, the capabilities of German aircraft, rapid adaptation to German tactics by the British and the poorer quality of pilot replacements to JG 26 put a greater burden on the dwindling number of veteran pilots. This situation led to a conflict between the two significant psychological needs of the fighter pilots: confidence in their aircraft and tactics.

Galland found a partial solution to Göring's order to maintain close escort by developing a flexible escort system that allowed his pilots constantly to change altitude, airspeed, direction and distance to the bombers during close-escort operations. The results were better and acceptable to his pilots; by the end of the Battle of Britain, JG 26 had gained a reputation as one of only two fighter wings that performed escort duties with consistently low losses to the bombers. The worst day for JG 26 in the battle was 30 September when it lost four pilots for seven victory claims. Fighter bomber (Jabo) operations became prominent in October and November as the bombers turned to night bombing (The Blitz) with London the main target. On 20 October 1940, in Unternehmen Opernball (Operation Opera), jabos flew in support of a 300-aircraft mission against Fighter Command targets.

During the Battle of Britain, the Geschwader claimed 285 fighters shot down for the loss of 56 pilots, a ratio of 5:1. In the view of one analyst, JG 26s losses were fairly low, considering it had only four rest days from mid-August to the end of October. Galland ended the year one of the leading fighter pilots of the Luftwaffe and was given national attention by the Nazi propaganda machine. Individuals like Galland, Mölders and Helmut Wick were publicised, unlike the Air Ministry which deprecated emphasis on individuals. Wick was dead before the end of November and Mölders under a year later. Four fighter pilots of the wing claimed 31 per cent of the aircraft shot down. At the end of 1940, seven JG 26 members had been awarded the Knight's Cross.

=== Malta, Balkans, North Africa ===
JG 26 played a brief role in the Siege of Malta and North African Campaign. On 22 January 1941, Müncheberg, leading 7. Staffel was informed by Gruppenkommandeur Schöpfel that he had to relocate to Sicily in support of X. Fliegerkorps, under the command of General der Flieger (General of the Flyers) Hans Geisler, for actions against the strategically important island of Malta. With the opening of a new front in North Africa in mid-1940, British air and sea forces based on the island could attack Axis ships transporting vital supplies and reinforcements from Europe to North Africa. To counter this threat the Luftwaffe and the Regia Aeronautica (Italian Royal Air Force) were tasked with bombing raids in an effort to neutralise the RAF defences and the ports. That day the unit and a 40-strong detachment of ground crews departed Wevelgem. They arrived at Gela on Sicily on 9 February 1941. The appearance of JG 26 over the island led to rising losses among the ageing Hurricane squadrons due to superior aircraft and experience. JG 26 had few, if any, losses. In March the unit claimed no less than 13 RAF fighters. The 7. Staffel, and elements of the support ground personnel, were relocated to Grottaglie airfield near Taranto in Apulia on 5 April 1941. 7/JG 26 flew in support of the German invasion of Yugoslavia and Greece on 6 April. In support of this invasion, the pilots attacked the airfield at Podgorica. The staffel destroyed three Yugoslav aircraft, but were back to operating from Malta by 8 April, until 31 May when based at Molaoi, Greece. On 14 June the staffel was ordered to North Africa to support the fight against Operation Battleaxe under the command of I. Gruppe of JG 27 from Gazala. 7./JG 26 achieved successes in Africa but during August–September the unit suffered serviceability problems. Ultra routinely reported on the unit's location and orders. On 24 September 1941 it left Africa, never to return. In the Battle of the Mediterranean, 7./JG 26 claimed 52 enemy aircraft but did not lose a single pilot.

=== Channel Front ===
The bulk of JG 26 remained on the Channel coast under the command of Luftflotte 3, where it operated uninterrupted for the next four years following the Battle of Britain. RAF Fighter Command and its new commanding officers Shoto Douglas and Trafford Leigh-Mallory wished to take the offensive into France and Belgium in 1941. Termed the "lean towards France", Leigh-Mallory, No. 11 Group RAF, began the Circus offensive in January 1941. The German-led invasion of the Soviet Union, Operation Barbarossa, in June 1941, provided a greater strategic rationale for applying pressure to the Luftwaffe in Western Europe. On 9 January 1941, Circus Number 1 was flown by 60 fighters over northern France. The Germans ignored them, using the same tactics as Keith Park in the Battle of Britain. RAF Bomber Command was shortly employed as bait to bring the Luftwaffe to battle. There were few high-value strategic targets in France and Belgium within range of escorting Spitfires. A follow-up Circus with small bomber formations and strong fighter escort began on 10 January as the policy's second element began. These were followed by "Rodeo" [massed fighter sweeps] and "Ramrod" operations [standard fighter-escort for bombers]. Mallory was revisiting Hugh Trenchard's World War I policy.

From 1941 through to 1942, JG 26 were fully occupied with defending German military targets in northern France and Belgium from RAF incursions. JG 26 defended airspace east of the Seine to the Dutch border, while JG 2 covered west of the demarcation line. JG 26 formally came under the command of Theo Osterkamp's Jagdfliegerführer 2. At the beginning of 1941 Galland had three experienced and successful Gruppenkommandeur under his command; Walter Adolph, Rolf Pingel and Schöpfel. Müncheberg and the recently arrived Josef Priller would be appointed to senior commands during the year after the loss of Pingel and Adolph in action and Galland to the high command. 1941 proved to be a successful period for JG 26 tactically. Galland and his gruppen could choose which RAF formations to engage, and when and how to engage them. In essence, the German and British units were fighting a reverse Battle of Britain. At the beginning of the year, JG 26 began converting to the Bf 109 F-2. The fighter was aerodynamically cleaner than the E variant, and could out perform the previous version considerably. The type was similar looking to the Spitfire V, entering service simultaneously and the two were comparable. The cannons were deleted from the wing; one cannon remained firing through the propeller hub, and two heavy machine guns remained fixed above the engine to fire through the propeller. I. and III. Gruppe began conversion at Dortmund and Bonn. Consequently, only III./JG 26 were equipped with the F by 28 June 1941—39 machines reported. By 27 September, I. Gruppe had the F-4 while II. Gruppe equipped with the Focke-Wulf Fw 190.

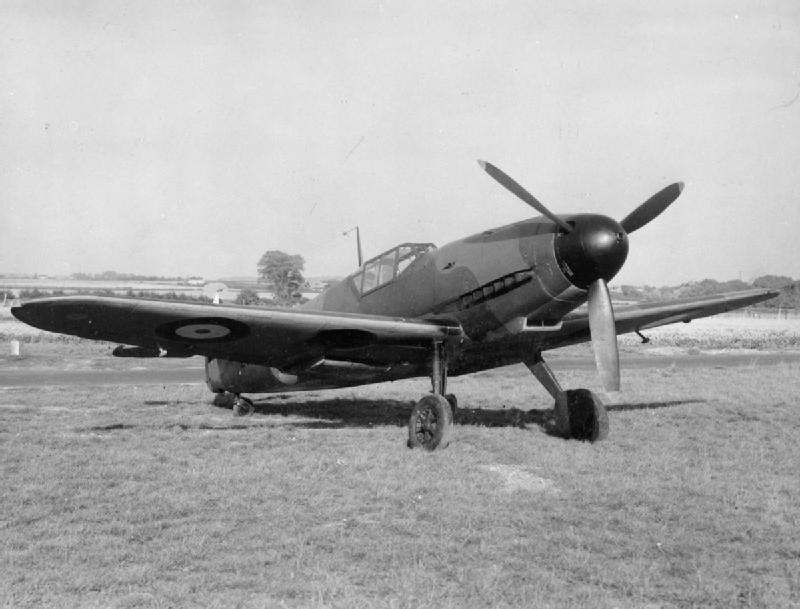
The captured Bf 109 F-2 piloted by Rolf Pingel, commanding II. Gruppe. He force-landed in England and was captured.

From January to June 1941, JG 2 and JG 26 were supported by other fighter wings. Jagdgeschwader 1 (JG 1—1st Fighter Wing), JG 51, Jagdgeschwader 52 (JG 52—52nd Fighter Wing), Jagdgeschwader 53 (JG 53—53rd Fighter Wing) and LG 2 were among those credited with successes against the Circus operations. From 9 to 21 June analysis attributes at least 18 specific Fighter Command losses to JG 26. On 22 June 1941, the German-led invasion of the Soviet Union left JG 2 and JG 26 the sole remaining fighter units in Western Europe. No. 2 Group RAF, Bomber Command, RAF Coastal Command supported by Fighter Command applied greater pressure in the West. Gustav Sprick and Galland downed two No. 145 Squadron RAF pilots on 18 June who became prisoner of war. Sprick was a Knight's Cross holder, but died in action just ten days later. On 10 July another Knight's Cross holder, Rolf Pingel, commanding II. Gruppe pursued a Short Stirling to the English coast, was hit and force-landed and promptly captured. His aircraft became the first Bf 109 F to be captured intact by the British. Fighter Command persisted with large-scale operations, but were suffering heavy casualties from the two German fighter wings. Eric Lock was among the casualties, posted missing on 3 August after strafing sortie (presumably ground-fire was the cause) and on 9 August Wing Commander Douglas Bader baled out and was captured. Galland entertained the famous pilot at JG 26 headquarters. The cause of Bader's capture occurred in the midst of combat with III. Gruppe commanded by Schöpfel. Galland, went through every report, even those of German pilots killed in the action, to determine Bader's victor. Each case was dismissed. RAF combat records indicate Bader may have been shot down by Flight Lieutenant "Buck" Casson of No. 616 Squadron RAF, who claimed a Bf 109 whose tail came off and the pilot baled out, before he himself was shot down and captured by Schöpfel. In the period 14 June–4 July Fighter Command lost 80 fighters and 62 pilots, while the two German wings lost 48 Bf 109s and 32 pilots; 2:1 in the Luftwaffe's favour.

The impact of Fighter Command's massive daylight operations were offset by the tactical deployment of German units which enjoyed radar-based guidance. They skilfully used this to outweigh their numerical inferiority. 32 Freya radar and 57 Würzburg radar sets were employed from Heligoland to the Bay of Biscay. Fighter Command flew 6,875 sorties from January to June and lost 112 aircraft—57 in June. From July to December this increased to 20,495 with 416 losses. The pressure grew on JG 2, allotted to Jagdfliegerführer 3, JG 1, assigned to Jagdfliegerführer 1 and JG 26. There were 4,385 "alarmstarts" in July 1941 and another 4,258 in August. September saw a reduction to 2,534 and to 2,553 in October before falling to 1,287. Nevertheless, the fighter wings still retained 430 fighters on 27 September 1941. August proved the costliest to the Luftwaffe in the second half of the year with 42 losses which fell to 18 in September and 15 in October. In September 1941 JG 26 began requipping with the Fw 190, and by year's end had mostly adopted the type. The Fw 190 A proved troublesome initially but soon proved formidable and superior to the Spitfire V. Walter Adolph became the first Fw 190 commander and pilot killed and he was replaced by Müncheberg at the head of II. Gruppe.

Fighter Command suffered badly in 1941. Losses were about 2 percent [of aircraft per sortie] while 2 Group Bomber Command suffered 7.68 percent casualties. From 14 June 1941, Fighter Command reported 411 fighters over the Channel; 14 on the last "Circus" of the year. The British claimed 731 German aircraft destroyed though only 103 German fighters were lost. A post-war survey concluded by the Air Ministry asserted that the RAF lost 2.5 pilots for every German fighter downed. The German geschwader, in contrast, destroyed four for every one they lost. Their percent remained at one percent. Among the most successful pilots to emerge were Josef Priller, who claimed 19 in 26 days from 16 June. On 5 December 1941 Galland was appointed General der Jagdflieger after the death of Mölders. Schöpfel replaced him.

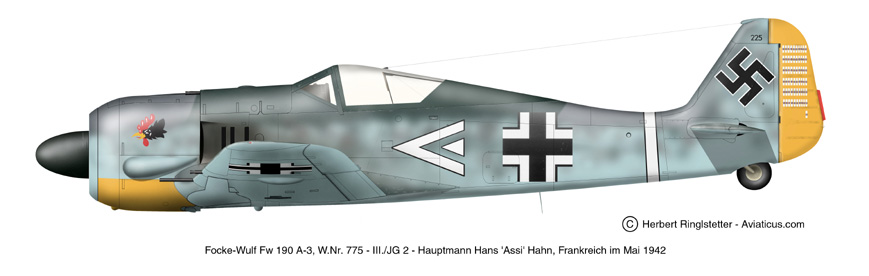
Fw 190 of JG 26, 1942.

1942 began with Galland planning and executing the air superiority plan Operation Donnerkeil to support the Channel Dash, a redeployment of two Kriegsmarine battleships and one heavy cruiser to Germany from Brest, France. JG 1, JG 2 and JG 26 were involved in the surprise operation. Schöpfel led the JG 26 element of the operation over the Dover Strait personally at the head of III. Gruppe. Fighter Command and Fleet Air Arm forces were slow to react, but appeared just as JG 2 handed over responsibility to Schöpfel. Lieutenant Commander Eugene Esmonde, acting as Squadron Leader, No. 825 Squadron FAA took off with his Fairey Swordfish formation to attack the ships. Squadron Leader Brian Kingcome's No. 72 Squadron RAF offered their only protection but were overwhelmed by the German fighters. All the Swordfish were shot down and Esmonde was awarded the Victoria Cross. Only five of the original eighteen Swordfish crew survived. Fighter Command lost eight fighters in aerial combat—401 Squadron are known to have suffered on loss against JG 26; no loss or damage in 72 Squadron was listed. In March 1942, post-war analysis credits JG 26 with 27 Fighter Command fighters destroyed; though it sustained many more unattributed losses.

April 1942 continued with Fighter Command continuing the daylight offensive while Bomber Command stepped up the area bombing offensives by night. The American Eighth Air Force began operations escorted later in the year escorted by Spitfire Vs. The superiority of the Fw 190 over the Spitfire was evident to British. Air Vice Marshal Johnnie Johnson remarked "Yes, the 190 was causing us real problems at this time. We could out-turn it, but you couldn't turn all day. As the number of 190s increased, so the depth of our penetrations decreased. They drove us back to the coast really.". 48 specific Fighter Command losses have been linked to JG 26 in April 1942. Many more were lost in aerial combat with either JG 2 or JG 26 . Improving weather conditions and the Fw 190 brought more casualties in May and June. At least 46 Fighter Command fighters were lost in action with JG 26 in this period while a further seven fell in combat with both JG 2 and JG 26—many more losses remain unattributed. Over claiming was an issue; for the first nine days of May, JG 2 and JG 26 claimed 53 (31 and 22 respectively). Actual Fighter Command losses were 35. For the same period, the German fighter units lost six between them; the British claimed 18 destroyed and another 18 probably destroyed. Though the subject of overclaiming is polemical, the disparity between the reported losses on either side was significant. Nine Spitfires were lost for every two Fw 190 or Bf 109s that sustained irreparable combat damage up to mid-May.

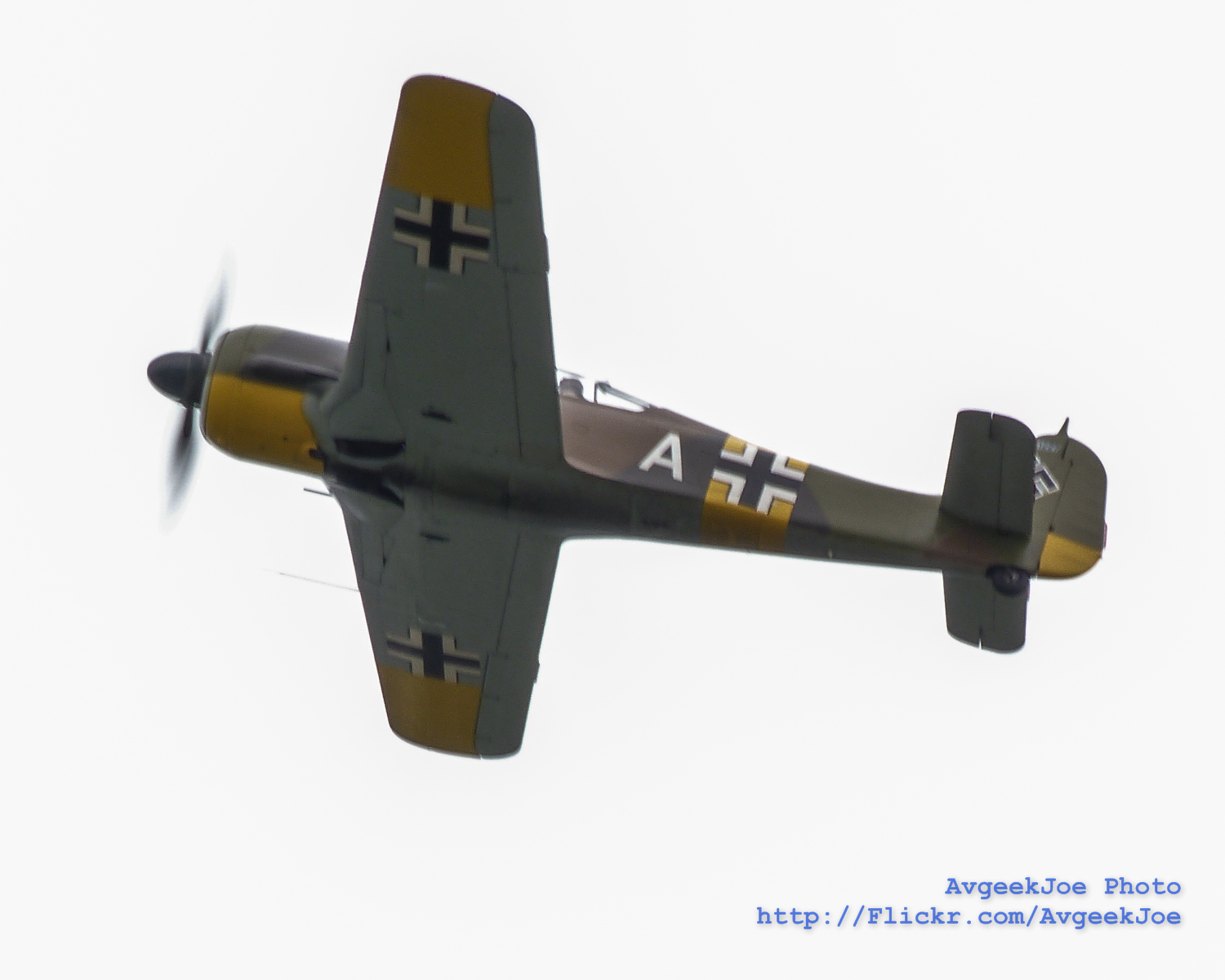
Fw 190(A-5) of the World Heritage Collection (June 2012)—the 190 was main fighter of JG 26 from late 1941 to 1945

A main change of command occurred when Joachim Müncheberg left II. Gruppe on 21 July 1942 and replaced by Conny Meyer. In August 1942 the British and Canadians carried out Operation Jubilee, a raid on Dieppe harbour. Fighter, Command and Coastal Commands supported the Commando landings with powerful air forces. The RAF did not succeed in forcing the Luftwaffe into a pitched-battle over the beachhead and Fighter Command in particular, suffered heavy casualties. The British claimed to have inflicted heavy casualties on the Luftwaffe, the balance sheet showed the reverse; Allied aircraft losses amounted to 106, including 88 RAF fighters (70 Spitfires were lost to all causes) and 18 bombers, against 48 Luftwaffe aircraft lost. Included in that total were 28 bombers, half of them Dornier Do 217s from KG 2. The two German Jagdgeschwader units had the following results: JG 2 lost 14 Fw 190s with eight pilots killed and JG 26 lost six Fw 190s with six pilots killed. The Spitfire Squadrons, 42 with Mark Vs, and only four with Mark IXs were tasked with close air support, fighter escort and air-superiority missions. The exact number of Spitfires lost to the Fw 190 gruppen is unknown. The Luftwaffe claimed 61 of the 106 RAF machines lost, which included all types: JG 2 claimed 40 and JG 26 claimed 21. Wing Commander Minden Blake was among the notable British casualties. the 130 Squadron leader was captured after being shot down by a Fw 190.

During the course of 1942 and 1943 JG 2 and JG 26 carried out "Jabo" operations in towns and coastal targets in England, and occasionally bombed London. At the beginning of 1943, SKG 10 had taken over these operations as JG 2 and JG 26 could no longer be spared for offensive operations. JG 26 were at a distinct disadvantage in comparison to JG 2 in "Jabo" operations. Its pilots had little experience and no dedicated staffeln when attacks began in earnest in March 1942. Those deemed unsuitable as fighter pilots, undisciplined or who had clashed with commanders were the first sent into 10. and 13. Staffeln which were to operate as fighter-bombers. The lack of training and enthusiasm in the 17 "tip and run" attacks contributed to the ineffectiveness on 10. Staffel. The imbalance of the raids was noticed by the British; Kent and Sussex being 10./JG 26s area of operations, while the experienced 13./JG 2 operated over Hampshire 49 times, though 10./JG 26s region was more heavily defended. The first certain fighter-bomber mission occurred on 7 March 1942. From 19 April to 18 June German records indicate 32 Jabo missions were flown by Bf 109 F-4s against a variety of targets. Fighter-bomber attacks by 10. Staffel lasted up until 5 February 1943. Five JG 26 Fw 190s were lost this way on 21 January 1943.

In 1942, JG 1, 2 and 26 began to experience a new opponent on the Channel Front. The United States Army Air Force (USAAF) Eighth Air Force began carrying out bombing operations over France and the Low Countries. The B-17 Flying Fortress quickly earned a reputation, almost immediately, of absorbing heavy damage and remaining airborne. In 1942, a typical interception of this type by Fw 190 pilots was difficult. The American bombers flew at altitudes in excess of 8,000 m (26,000 ft), and lacking a super-charger, the Fw 190s struggled to reach altitudes even with considerable warning from American radio/signals traffic. At that altitude, Fw 190A-2s had only slight speed advantages over the B-17. The Revi gunsights were set for fighter, not anti-bomber combat, and set for a range of 100 m (110 yd). The large bombers loomed in quickly long before the German fighters had reached effective range encouraging premature firing. The psychological impact of the massed-firepower of American bombers encouraged inexperienced German pilots to break off too soon from the classic stern-attack position to cause any damage. This anxiety among green pilots heightened through the use of the .50 calibre guns on American aircraft. They out-ranged the MG 151/20 cannon and MG 17 machine gun on German fighters, and in a slow-closing chase the German pilot often had to sit through several minutes of American gunfire before they got within effective firing range of their own armament. American gunners saturated the air with tracers to disrupt or ward off attacks. In response, Galland organised a test group to experiment with air-to-air rockets and heavy calibre cannon to remedy the situation.

For the Luftwaffe, the winter of 1942-43 was spent increasing the engine and firepower of their fighters. Weights rose, and engine power had to follow to keep pace. In order to increase compression ratios in their engines, and unable to do so through the use of high-strength alloys and high-octane fuel lacking in Germany, engineers opted for chemical enhancements. The Bf 109G-1 high-altitude fighter, powered by the DB 605A was given the GM-1 injection. The Fw 190A-3 was introduced with improved BMW 801D-2 engines providing more power. The Fw 190A-4 and Bf 109G-4 soon followed, with improved radios and homing devices. At their preferred altitudes – below 20,000 ft for the 190 and the reverse for the 109 -each of these types was a match for the Spitfire IX. Most of the fighters arriving at JG 2 and JG 26 bases in late 1942 were Bf 109s. The Fw 190 was in short supply, and given the multi-role function of the Fw 190 the Channel Front wings were to scheduled to revert to Bf 109s to permit the Fw 190 to move to priority theatres – a move encouraged by the Fw 190s lack of performance above 7,500 m (25,000 ft) where US bombers operated.

In contrast, the Bf 109 was a superb dogfighter and above 9,000 m (30,000 ft) was in its element. In the spring, 1943, I/JG 2 and II/JG 26 were flying Bf 109s and Fw 190s. Operationally at gruppe level this was not efficient and it was decided for these units to retain their Fw 190s; and did so until the end of the war. The Bf 109 and Fw 190 were used to complement each other in the coming battles. The Fw 190s armament, considered effective against all enemies, was used against bombers more frequently, while the high-flying Bf 109s engaged escorting fighters. The Bf 109G-4 was “up-gunned” as well to the Bf 109G-6, with two MG 131 machine guns replacing the MG 17, and supplementing the MG 151/20 cannon in the nose. The MW 50 (water-methanol) additive increased lower altitude performance but the increase in weight reduced manoeuvrability. German pilots were critical of the Bf 109s fragility, but praised the Fw 190s strong construction; the latter type remained the preference among western theatre pilots.

=== Eastern Front ===
The news JG 26 was ordered to be ordered onto the Eastern Front in January 1943 was greeted with enthusiasm. The perception of the pilots was that the Red Air Force, in qualitative terms, was weaker and victories, a prerequisite to awards and promotions, easier to obtain. JG 26 was ordered to replace JG 54 in Luftflotte 1, supporting Army Group North in maintaining the Siege of Leningrad. The move would be staged by gruppen and staffeln with key personnel and equipment. All other crews and maintenance devices remained on the bases. The move was ordered as the Red Army began Operation Iskra and scored a victory by establishing a land link to the city. Only 6 miles (9.7 km) wide, every point was covered by German artillery, and although Army Group North sealed the penetration by 18 January 1943, it could not eliminate it. Conversely, the Soviets could not widen it through further offensives which ended on 1 April.

Fighting broke out near III./JG 54's base on Lake Ilmen in February when the Soviets began to eliminate German forces from the Demyansk pocket. The decision was made to replace III./JG 54 with I./JG 26 first. The intended swap of the wings never took place. While I. Gruppe went east to support Army Group Centre on the Moscow sector, 7 staffel was detached again, and sent to the Leningrad front until late June 1943 as part of I./JG 54. I/JG 26 returned to France after four months of operations.

On 5 and 7 March I. Gruppe claimed 21 Soviet aircraft in total and from 9 to 14 March claimed another eight. During this period, the German army carried out Operation Büffel, a series of local withdrawals in the Battles of Rzhev. The authorised strength of the gruppe was 40 aircraft and pilots. The quarterly report on 31 March stated that 48 pilots were present, 35 available for duty. It had 35 Fw 190s, but only 24 were operational. In the late spring operated form Dno until 6 May. I. Gruppe moved to Smolensk on 9 May and participated in the build-up for the Battle of Kursk. It was involved in Operation Carmen, a series of bombing attacks on Kursk rail targets on 2 June. Johannes Seifert relinquished command of the gruppe and was replaced by Fritz Losigkeit. The group returned to Germany soon afterwards and was not involved in the Kursk battle.

7./JG 26 added their dozen Fw 190s to the 40 from I./JG 54. In this sector they were opposed by 1,200 aircraft of the 13th Air Army and 14th Air Army. Klaus Mietusch commanded the staffel. According to one account, Mietusch cared little for his men as individuals, and judged them solely on their performance in the air. The leader hardly ever spoke to non-commissioned officer. Mietusch was ordered to take command of III. Gruppe on 29 June after the death of the previous commander and left within twenty four hours. The staffel left the Soviet Union on 10 July for Cuxhaven to join III. Gruppe which had been moved to Germany to reinforce those defending Germany from the US Eighth Air Force. But the time of their departure, two pilots had been killed in action, one in an accident, one wounded and one captured on the Eastern Front. While the staffel claimed 63 Soviet aircraft, like I. Gruppe, it made no impression on the course of the air war.

=== Western Front and Defence of the Reich ===
The air war changed considerably in the first months of 1943. Fighter Command continued its offensive over Northwest Europe with growing numbers of the Spitfire IX ending the performance superiority of the Fw 190 A. Bomber Command's area offensives began in earnest with the Battle of the Ruhr and attack on Hamburg and the US Eighth Air Force, operational since mid-1942, was in sufficient strength to strike into Germany in January 1943 beginning the Combined Bomber Offensive, which began to grind down Luftwaffe strength. In North Africa, the Axis collapsed in May, having expended enormous manpower and material strength to hold African and Mediterranean positions while providing US forces with invaluable experience and intelligence on the quality of their enemy. The same month, Black May in U-boat campaign ensured the German navy could no longer alter the course of the war. On the Eastern Front, the defeat at the Battle of Stalingrad and the failure of Operation Blue denied Hitler victory and forced a continuation of the war which compelled the Luftwaffe to fight multiple enemies with inferior resources. From this point, the Luftwaffe, unprepared to fight a war of attrition over Germany, was gradually forced away from the peripheries of German-occupied Europe to defend the homeland. JG 26 was among those fighter wings that switched to reinforce the home defence, which became Luftflotte Reich, and back to the Channel Front when required. The Luftflotte 3 operations staff reported in April 1943, the main defensive effort was against USAAF daylight raids

From September to December 1942 JG 26 come into contract with the US Eighth Air Force with growing frequency. One of the earliest collaborations between the RAF and United States Army Air Force (USAAF) was Operation Oyster on 6 December 1942. JG 26 engaged the American element of the raid, which acted as a diversion. Only one victory was achieved at the cost of two pilots. Galland placed pressure on Schöpfel to increase the rate of successful interceptions. The general demanded head-on and in rear attacks, in formation, then to end the attack above, not below the bombers, where a pilot could find himself alone. The psychological impact of the US bombers' return fire encouraged German pilots to break off and attacks were rarely carried out exactly as Galland prescribed. JG 26 faced the first major American attack into Europe against Lille on 9 October. III. Gruppe shot down four bombers, the worst single American loss at the time. The US bombers claimed 56 fighters destroyed, 26 probably destroyed and 20 damaged. President Franklin Roosevelt quoted the figures in a radio broadcast, which amused the German unit for it had suffered a single casualty. Nevertheless, some early raids were not intercepted at all, earning JG 26 the wrath of Göring and Galland. Galland was concerned at the perceived timidity of the fighter pilots and visited Schöpfel several times to assure himself that his former command had not declined in quality.

In January 1943 Schöpfel handed command of JG 26 to Josef Priller. The first months of 1943 were not intensive in combat terms for JG 26; one author described them as "The Last Pause". On 27 January 1943, the weather conditions finally allowed for an attack on German soil and the US Eighth Air Force bombed Wilhelmshaven. From June to July 1943, the pace of aerial fighting increased. The Eighth Air Force began "Blitz Week" to signal its intention to fulfill the Pointblank directive. The appearance of the P-47 Thunderbolt presented a new longer-range threat to the Luftwaffe. The US fighter was heavily armed and had a powerful engine with a super-charger, and performed well at high altitudes. However, lacking drop tanks its range was little better than the Spitfire. With drop tanks, both aircraft could reach the German-Dutch border in 1943; the external tanks were only fourth on the Eighth Air Force's list of priorities. Pressurised drop-tanks were used in a raid on Emden on 27 September 1943, the first time US fighter escorts had made the flight over Germany. The P-47 was not as maneuverable at lower levels than German fighters but could out-dive the Bf 109 and Fw 190. The introduction of paddle blade propellers and water-injection improved the climb and acceleration making the fighter an equal of German fighters, and well suited for the coming battles. JG 26's tactics against the P-47 were summarised by Oberleutnant Hans Hartigs, whose comments were captured on tape in his bugged cell in England in late 1944:

If attacked, we should draw the P-47s to a lower altitude (3,000 metres (9,800 feet)) by diving, then turn about suddenly. The P-47s will overshoot; if they try to turn, they will lose speed and are vulnerable. The P-47 should zoom-climb and dive again. If we get into a turning combat, a P-47 can often get us on the first turn. If the Fw 190 climbs slightly in the turn (below 5,000 m (16,000 ft)) it will gain on the P-47.

Early model P-47 pilots practiced the dive and zoom at high altitude. Robert S. Johnson advocated a Barrel roll move, opposite to the arc of the turn, when pursued in a conventional turn if an enemy sat behind a P-47. This usually placed a P-47 behind its enemy. JG 26 claimed 44 American and British Commonwealth aircraft in June. JG 26 lost eight killed in action, one in an accident, one wounded in an accident and 10 others wounded in action. July costed the wing eight killed in action, five in accidents and nine wounded. On 13 August, III./JG 26 replaced IIII./JG 54 at Amsterdam Airport Schiphol. Two days later, the British began Operation Starkey. Airfields in the Pas de Calais were bombed but only two Geschwaderstab Fw 190s were damaged. JG 26 made 15 claims from 31 July to 15 August, 11 of which were accepted; most of the claims were B-17 Flying Fortress heavy bombers. From 9 to 15 August the wing suffered another three killed in action and four wounded. On 17 August 1943, I. Gruppe were scrambled by Walter Grabmann, a pre-war JG 26 group commander, and then Jafü-Holland, from Woensdrecht to combat the Schweinfurt–Regensburg mission. Several gruppen made contact with the bombers. 16 claims were confirmed by the German side to their pilots for five killed and six wounded. Among the notable fatalities was Major Wilhelm-Ferdinand Galland, brother of Adolf Galland, who fell in combat with the US 56th Fighter Group. The 353rd Fighter Group, three RAF squadrons and bomber crews accounted for the others. Karl Borris' I Gruppe made contact with the bombers and elements of 3./JG 26 attacked while Spitfires were present, losing two. After the Spitfires turned back, I. Gruppe was able to stay with the B-17s for much longer, though they were only able to account for four. Klaus Mietusch and III. Gruppe employed similar tactics, waiting for the US escorts to leave before beginning a 30-minute attack near Aachen claiming four but losing one and three more Bf 109s damaged against the unescorted bombers.

Twelve days later, Adolf Glunz became the only non-commissioned officer to receive the Knight's Cross—he and Wilhelm-Ferdinand Galland were the only members to receive it in 1943.

The Second Raid on Schweinfurt in October 1943 was a victory for the defending Luftwaffe. The cost of this victory remained high in fighters and pilots. II. Gruppe fought against the US escorts, and III. Gruppe was held in reserve at Lille, but was unable to intercept the returning disorganised bomber stream because it was not given the location of it. JG 2 was able to claim only nine bombers over the Somme, the other B-17s escaped in the growing cumulus. The victory ended deep American raids until February 1944. The Eighth targeted installations along the German coast in the intervening period with an average strength of 380 heavy bombers and eight fighter groups; on 6 November 1943 the Lockheed P-38 Lightning US 55th Fighter Group and seven other US fighter groups supported a raid on Wilhelmshaven. II./JG 3 and III./JG 1 broke up one group of P-47s, but others completed the defence of the bombers. III. Gruppe, JG 26, loaned JG 3 experienced Bf 109 pilots to fill its ranks because of losses.

During the year, JG 26 lost Johannes Seifert, Seifert and Friedrich Geißhardt killed in action; all of them group commanders. In 1943, the wing claim-to-loss ratio was 4:1 which suggested a favourable combat performance. However, there were signs Allied operations were wearing it down. The 158 pilots killed or wounded during the year, was double that of 1942 and equivalent to an annual attrition rate of 100 percent. The strength of the wing was 50 percent of authorised strength; but only two thirds of that total were operational. It had 68 fighters on 31 December; all Bf 109 G-6s and Fw 190 A-6s. Of the 185 pilots, 107 were available, the remainder were on leave, convalescing, or considered not ready for combat. At least 84 of RAF Fighter Command's losses during 1943 have been attributed to JG 26.

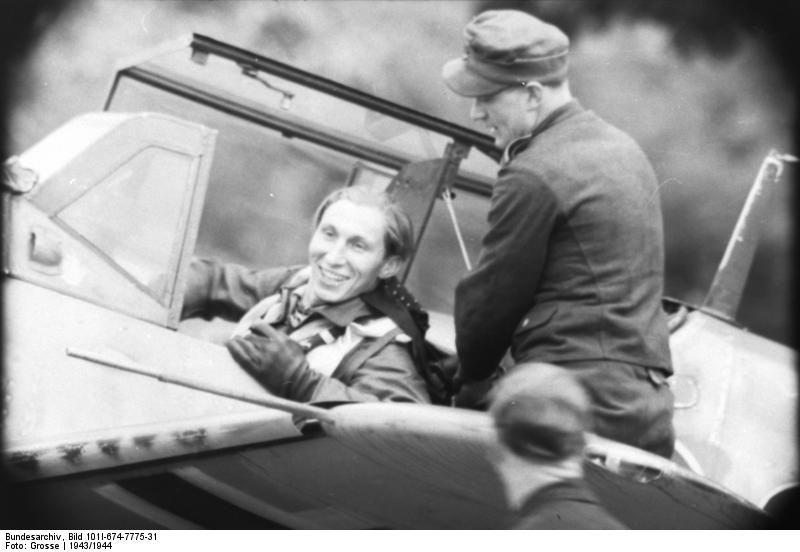
Major Klaus Mietusch, commanded III. Gruppe until his death in September 1944

The temporary victory ended in February 1944 with Big Week, part of Operation Argument. The American-led operation was a series of attacks against German fighter production. All three gruppen were involved in the defensive effort. By 25 February, the strength of II. and III. Gruppen were so low that they were ordered to parallel the bomber stream and attack only unescorted bombers on that day. I. Gruppe, the strongest in JG 26, did succeed in downing four Martin B-26 Marauder medium bombers which accompanied every mission. The American operations were successful, if overstated in the damage done to German production, but air superiority in daylight had passed irrevocably to the Allies. This month had seen the introduction into the air war of the North American P-51 Mustang. The fighter eventually had the range and performance to escort US bombers to the target and back which supplemented the drop-tank fitted P-47s and P-38s. American tactics soon changed from protecting the US bombers to patrolling fixed boxes of airspace. American fighter pilots were free to hunt German fighters; bombers that missed their rendezvous were left to fend for themselves. This marked a more aggressive use of VIII Fighter Command. The RAF 2nd Tactical Air Force was also released from escort duty—the Spitfires were now authorised to seek out the Luftwaffe while the bombers softened up the invasion coast in preparation for Operation Overlord. JG 26 was credited with 56 Allied aircraft in January but lost 19 killed and six wounded. 45 were credited in February for 18 killed and 17 wounded. On 6 March the Americans attacked Berlin; JG 26 claimed seven American and one British aircraft in combat with the main and diversionary forces for one loss. Two days later the Americans struck again; III. Gruppe reached the bombers but were engaged by US fighters. Two pilots were killed and one wounded against the P-47s. JG 26 pilots were given credit for nine American aircraft. On 16 March this gruppe attempted to intercept returning US bombers over France but the coordinated action with JG 2 failed. Three bombers were claimed but lost five killed and four wounded. On 31 March, the Eighth was placed under Dwight D Eisenhower's command for the invasion and the Combined Bomber Offensive was suspended.

In June 1944, JG 2 and JG 26 was to form the nucleus of the 5. Jagddivision (5th Fighter Division) in the II. Jagdkorps (Fighter Corps). The fighter forces expected an invasion in the Pas de Calais, where they were based. The wing had replaced its losses and was in a much improved condition from previous months. I. and II. Gruppe were equipped entirely with the Fw 190 A-8, which retained powerful armament, a further fuel tank to improve ranger, and engine modifications, such the GM-1 for improved high-altitude performance. III. Gruppe retained the ageing Bf 109 G-6, which was an effective dogfighter, but lacked the speed to initiate or escape combat—experienced pilots could use its turn-climb qualities but inexperienced pilots proved easy targets in this type. On 6 June the Normandy landings began. Geschwaderkommodore Priller and his wingman were the only two pilots to attack the beaches; in this case Sword Beach. The following day, all three gruppen flew strafing attacks against Allied infantry from "dawn to dusk". III. Gruppe arrived at Guyancourt and Villacoublay, the two best equipped airfields in the region. II. Gruppe flew to Cormeilles. III./JG 54 reinforced JG 26. The unit came under the administrative control of the wing but was never formally attached. From 3 to 7 June JG 26 claimed 12 confirmed victories against five killed and two wounded. JG 26's pilots were given confirmed credit for 50 destroyed and five probably destroyed in June over Normandy—many more claims were made but it is unknown whether they were granted to pilots. The known cost of the fighting for the month was 32 pilots killed, 21 wounded and one captured.

JG 26 pilots were utilised as close air support units. The wing was known to have flown attacks with rockets in the Saint-Lô area against American tank and motor convoys as well as Avranches on 1 August. On 28 July the German army recognised the American point of effort near Saint-Lo. III. Gruppe was ordered to Creil to support III./JG 2 in rocket attacks on 28 July. The mission to Avranches was successful in that it incurred no casualties. II. Jagdkorps had been ordered to keep attacking that sector. Main targets were tanks and motor traffic. I. and III. Gruppen supported Operation Lüttich on 7 August, but the mission failed due to insufficient forces. II. Gruppe was one of four rebuilt gruppen returned to France on 8 August and arrived at Guyancourt four days later. Over the course of 8 and 9 August JG 26 lost three pilots killed and two wounded in combat with US fighters from the 359th Fighter Group and 373d Fighter Group. The situation in Normandy was critical for the Wehrmacht the Waffen-SS. I. Gruppe and III./JG 54 rested for two days to recover, but III. Gruppe flew over the Falaise Pocket and incurred casualties. On 13 August, all units engaged in rocket-missions were ordered to cease operations. Their aircraft had to fly at more than 30 minutes on emergency power boost and required replacement. The order did not rescind the close support operations. From 15 August JG 26 still flew strafing missions against US armoured formations between Alençon and Le Mans. II Gruppe fought its first major battle since its return on this date. Emil Lang led 34 Fw 190s on a familiarisation flight for new pilots in the Paris area. Three P-47s and two Fw 190s were destroyed. Ground attack operations continued to late August. As the Falaise pocket closed, trapping large German forces, JG 26 lost nine pilots killed and two wounded in a single action with No. 315 Polish Fighter Squadron. The German pilots were given credit for five destroyed against various fighter units including two from the 315th. In fact only one pilot, commander of 315th Eugeniusz Horbaczewski was shot down. On 28 August the German fighter forces moved eastward toward Germany. Only JG 26s three gruppen and II./JG 53 remained operational. Göring rescinded his earlier orders that leaders and commanders fly only with large formations because he feared that they were taking advantage of it. Staffelkapitans were to fly one mission per day every time his unit flew 3 or 4 sorties a day. Each group commander had to fly one mission per two days, and each wing commander one per three days.

=== Final battles to VE Day ===
The German collapse in France and Belgium resulted in a rapid Allied advance into western Netherlands and to the German border. Logistics slowed the Allied forces and their advanced stalled as German resistance stiffened and the German army began to recover from the defeat at Falaise. In September 1944, JG 26 lost two experienced group commanders, Klaus Mietusch and Emil Lang on 3rd and 17th. On the last date, British, Canadian, Polish and American forces began Operation Market Garden under the command of Bernard Law Montgomery. JG 26 was the nearest positioned German fighter wing and responded to the paratrooper landings. The German pilots could not reach the transports for they were protected by powerful formations of Allied fighters, mainly by the US Ninth Air Force. Mietusch was killed on this first day of the operation. German forces were unable to prevent Allied forces from penetrating into Germany. On 12 October 1944, JG 26 flew against the Eighth Air Force alone as weather grounded the remainder of the Luftwaffe. Priller led 57 Fw 190s into action. Allied radio interceptors listened as he cursed his pilots for not forming up correctly. II. and III. Gruppen pulled ahead of Stab and I. Gruppe. They were attacked from above by US fighters from the 56th and 78th Fighter Groups losing three pilots while Priller claimed his 101st victory over an isolated 357th Fighter Group P-51. The name of the pilot appeared on Priller's claim documents. The American was easy to identify for he was the only US aircraft shot down over Germany that day. The rest broke through to the bomber stream only for the US 364th Fighter Group to pounce on them. The inexperienced Fw 190 pilots lost five of their number before escaping. III. Gruppe flew further west of Hamburg, but ran into P-51s losing another five fighters, two killed and one wounded. Their attackers were from the US 363d Fighter Squadron, 357th Fighter Group led by Chuck Yeager. ULTRA followed JG 26s movements. Their analysts remarked that the tactical fighters—fighters for frontline patrol—were inexperienced in making effective time in assembly and attacking escorted US heavy bomber formations. It regarded the German effort on this occasion as "poor." The Luftwaffe did not attempt to intercept a single Eighth Air Force raid again for the duration of October 1944.

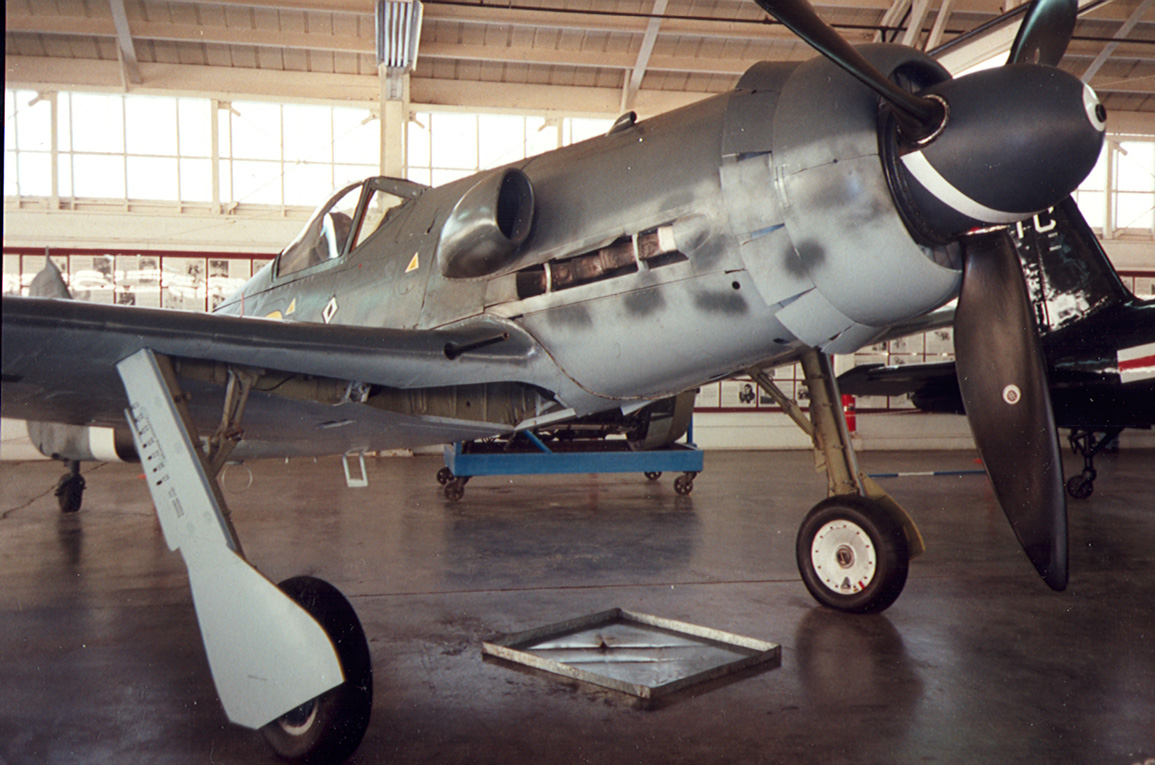
Focke-Wulf Fw 190 D-13/R11, "Yellow 10," Wk. Nr. 836017 from the Champlin Fighter Museum, Phoenix, Arizona, c. 1995. It was flown by Franz Götz of JG 26

In November 1944, the Luftwaffe exhibited a façade of air supremacy, yet superior numbers did not transfer into quality. On the second day of this month, Luftflotte Reich experienced the worst single daily loss of the entire war to date. The US Eighth Air Force lost 40 bombers and 16 fighters in the running battles, some to anti-aircraft artillery—3.6 and 1.8 respectively [the Germans claimed 82]. All while losing 120 fighters, 70 pilots killed or missing and 28 wounded. On 21st another 62 were killed or wounded, then on 26th 87 pilots were killed or posted missing—on 27 November another 51. Hitler was furious, bemoaned the impotence of the fighter force and the materials and labour used to produce it. Galland's "Great Blow"—the use of the entire fighter force in one massive strike against American bomber streams—would not take place. Hitler did not trust the Luftwaffe's ability to secure a decisive result, and preferred to use what remained of it to support a land offensive in the west. Hitler gambled the last substance of the Waffen-SS and Panzer Divisions on the Ardennes Offensive, an effort to capture Antwerp and split the Americans and British Commonwealth forces militarily, in the hopes of improving Germany's dire situation. On 24 November, Stab and I./JG 26 moved from bases at Greven, a grass airfield near Münster to Fürstenau. Both remained there until March 1945. I. Gruppe, commanded by Karl Borris since mid-1943, began receiving the Fw 190 D-9. Some 63 fighters of this type were received in the latter half of December 1944. II. Gruppe moved to Reinsehlen from Kirchhellen north of Soltau. There, the Fw 190 A-8 and A-9s were replaced by 55 Fw 190 D-9s. The gruppe was given to Anton Hackl, an able fighter pilot with 166 aerial victories to his credit. III. Gruppe was based at Plantlünne at the end of November. JG 26 was to take part in the last major offensive of the Wehrmacht in Western Europe. ULTRA intercepted messages to III. Gruppe ordering it move from Nordhorn, regardless of whether it could equip with GM-1 or not. ULTRA listened to the urgent Luftwaffe messages which belied a German build-up.

The offensive began on 16 December 1944. The Luftwaffe succeeded in challenging Allied air superiority for the first time since 1943 on 17 December. The achievement lay not in shooting down more aircraft than they lost, but forcing the US fighter-bombers, P-47s and P-38s, to engage in aerial combat before dropping their ordnance on German ground forces, thereby relieving the pressure on the army and Waffen SS. Göring, held in disgrace by Hitler, was once again permitted to attend daily military conferences; he was even invited to tea with Hitler for a week, until 23 December. The price to German fighter pilots, however, was high on 17 December; 55 killed and missing, 24 wounded. The fuel crisis in Germany compounded the Luftwaffe's problems, and on 23 December Göring ordered all non-essential transport to be immobilised to save fuel. JG 26, unlike many other jagdgeschwader retained a sizeable cadre of experienced pilots and enjoyed higher morale more than some other units. In the Battle of St. Vith, P-38s of the 428th Fighter Squadron, 474th Fighter Group, began strafing German motor columns, destroying seven trucks. I. Gruppe engaged the P-38s, which had claimed seven German fighters around Trier and attacked trains in the Bitburg area. Four US fighters were downed at no cost—the four Fw 190s the Americans claimed were probably from JG 2, as JG 26 reported no losses. On 23 December JG 2 contributed to the strong Luftwaffe effort to maintain aerial cover for German ground forces on this day; though air superiority was not achieved, the Luftwaffe was still contesting it by nightfall. I. Gruppe committed 23 Fw 190s to cover Army Group B; the gruppe fought its way through American aircraft flying over its airfield before engaging B-26 Marauders. Five German fighters were lost in combat with P-47s and two B-26s were claimed destroyed.

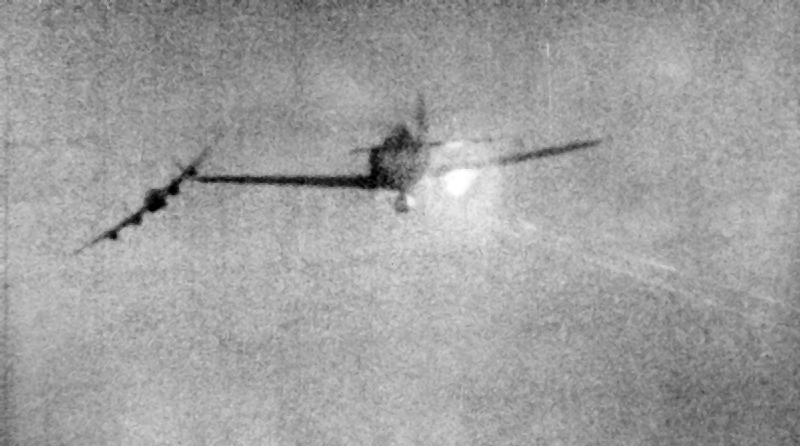
Gun camera footage shot from a P-51 Mustang Mark III flown by Flying Officer J. Butler of No. 65 Squadron RAF, as he shot down a Focke-Wulf Fw 190D of II/JG 26 which was attempting to attack an Avro Lancaster over Cologne, Germany

The good news dried up for Göring. The Allied strategic air forces were operational again, drawing the Luftwaffe in, and denying the Germans to counter Allied operations over the front. He scuttled back to Karinhall for his last wartime Christmas. JG 26 claimed 12 Allied aircraft destroyed, but none are known to have been allowed to stand; the status of the claims are either unknown or unconfirmed. Five JG 26 were killed in action, one wounded while two more were wounded in accidents. On Christmas Eve, II. Gruppe scrambled to intercept US Eighth Air Force heavy bombers attacking Jagdgeschwader 4, Jagdgeschwader 11 and JG 2s airfields. They were repulsed by the escorts, but destroyed five P-47s for four fighters and three pilots; one possibly fired on in error by the supporting JG 27. I. Gruppe also intercepted but their first mission in the Fw 190 D-9s was a disaster for them. Of the 18 sent up, eight aborted due to engine trouble, another went after a US artillery spotter plane, while the remaining nine engaged a formation of 60 B-17s and their strong P-38 escort near Liège. One American fighter was lost for four German. Allied units lost 44 bombers and 12 fighters on another day of heavy air fighting for 125 German fighter claimed destroyed. 85 German pilots were killed or captured on 24 December. Two were gruppen commanders and five staffel leaders were among them. A further 21 were wounded. On Boxing Day the war diary of II. Jagdkorps reported that three I. Gruppe pilots had been killed and two captured for one victory claimed—it reported II./JG 1 suffered the heaviest losses. JG 26 fought over the battlefront near St. Vith on 27 December. On 1 January 1945, JG 26 flew in the airfield attacks for Operation Bodenplatte. Their target was Brussels-Evere. Four pilots were wounded, 12 killed, seven captured. 11 fighters were purportedly shot down in error by German ground-fire. Four fighter pilots were shot down and survived unhurt. Only II. and III./JG 26 hit Evere. Between 44 and 52 Fw 190s from these units took off. II. and III./JG 26 knocked out the flak towers and destroyed anything combustible: hangars, trucks, fuel dumps and aircraft. 127 Wing RCAF lost one Spitfire in the air and 11 on the ground; 11 vehicles were damaged and one was destroyed. A total of 60–61 Allied aircraft were destroyed at Evere. A large number of transports were located there and attracted the attention of German pilots, which left many more Spitfires undamaged. Given the number of Spitfires on the field, the Canadian wing suffered "low" losses. The Canadian wing commander—Johnnie Johnson—blamed the poor marksmanship of German pilots for failing to achieve further success.

From 2 January 1945, fuel stocks permitting, JG 26 was ordered into the air on every day until wars end. It was ordered to support the armies in the field [close air support] and it would never engage the heavy bombers of the US Eighth Air Force again. Ten days later, the Red Army began the Vistula–Oder Offensive and all bar three wings were sent to the Eastern Front; JG 26 remained to defend northern Germany, with JG 27, JG 2 and JG 53 in the extreme south. From the 4 to 14 January 1945, 16 pilots were killed on operations, and five wounded, including Wilhelm Mayer who was awarded a posthumous Knight's Cross. In January 1945, JG 26 lost 31 pilots killed in action, three in accidents, eight captured, and at least 14 severely injured. III./JG 54, a fourth gruppe in all but name, lost 15 pilots killed in only two missions. JG 26 resisted Operation Clarion, mainly carried out by the US Ninth Air Force, and over the course of 22 to 24 February suffered the loss of three dead and three wounded. The battered III./JG 54, which had lost at least 50 Fw 190s since December 1944, officially joined JG 26 as its IV. Gruppe. On 25 February, three claims [status unknown] were made in exchange for seven killed and one wounded—one in action with 41 Squadron Spitfires the rest in action with the US 36th Fighter Group. The entire wing flew against fighter-bombers supporting the American advance on München Gladbach on 28 February. The 197-victory pilot Hauptmann Walter Krupinski, commanding III Gruppe since 27 September 1944, led the mission which resulted in five claims for the loss of two killed in action with RAF and US fighters; a further three were killed in accidents and two were wounded. Operations of this kind were tried again on 1 March, but nine pilots were killed in action with the US 366th Fighter Group and US 406th Fighter Group; 10 American fighters were claimed, but whether these were granted to pilots as a victory is unknown.

Fuel reserves had built up permitting a full-strength mission on 13 March. Morale remained reasonably high in JG 26. ULTRA intercepts picked up a request from the 14 Fliegerdivision on 25 March requesting volunteers for conversion onto the Messerschmitt Me 262. 58 pilots from KG 30, 49 from JG 27 and 36 from NSGr 20 did so; only 14 from JG 26 volunteered indicating a willingness to remain with their unit. A further order was passed down to accept only pilots with the Knight's Cross or German Cross in Gold for jet training. From 1 April the Western Allied invasion of Germany was gathering momentum. Allied armies had broken through the German lines and were surging across Germany akin to their campaign in France in 1944. JG 26 was ordered to conduct reconnaissance, since the German army had no frontlines, intelligence on Allied movements, or close support operations against road traffic. I. Gruppe moved to Delmenhorst on day two, while form the 3 April, II. Gruppe and its Fw 190 Ds received bombs and bomb racks; from this point they were a purely ground-attack gruppe. On 7 April, I., II. and III. Gruppen flew 30 ground-attack sorties. IV. Gruppe was scattered across several airfields, but was ordered officially to Stade. The following day JG 26 conducted a general withdrawal toward Hamburg as the Americans advanced through Hannover toward Berlin. JG 26 carried out s small number of attacks against them, and on the British Army as it neared Bremen. On 9 April IV. Gruppe was disbanded at Stade, and handed its aircraft to I. and II. Gruppen who had no more than 35 Fw 190s between them. On 19 April the wing managed to fly 35 sorties and the following day Hans Dortenmann became the last member of JG 26 awarded the Knight's Cross. On 24 April his unit flew against the Red Air Force over Oranienburg, claiming three Soviet fighters without loss. I. Gruppe withdrew to Klein Kummerfeld on 28 April.

In an unusual mission, on 26 April 1945, 12 Fw 190s from JG 26 under the command of Hans Dortenmann escorted Generaloberst Robert Ritter von Greim and test pilot Flugkapitän Hanna Reitsch from Rechlin–Lärz Airfield to Gatow Airport. The two were on a journey to meet Hitler in the Führerbunker. During the meeting, Hitler promoted von Greim to Generalfeldmarschall (field marshal) and appointed him Commander-in-Chief of the Luftwaffe. Dortenmann was involved in the last mission of the war, when he led nine Fw 190s on a "free hunt", combat air patrol, to the Kiel canal on 4 May. The German surrender at Lüneburg Heath the same day, precluded any further military operations. JG 26 was ordered to Norway on 5 May, but Karl Borris argued with commanding officer Franz Götz that weather made the transfer impossible. On 7 May Leutnant Hermann Gern became the last of approximately 30,000 Wehrmacht serviceman shot for dereliction of duty for returning home without orders. VE Day occurred the following morning. Götz surrendered JG 26 to the British at Flensburg.

== Commanding officers ==
=== Geschwaderkommodore ===
On 1 November 1938, the Geschwaderstab of JG 132 was recreated from elements of JG 234 which then became JG 26 on 1 May 1939.

• Oberst Eduard Ritter von Schleich	1 November 1938	–	9 December 1939
• Major Hans-Hugo Witt	14 December 1939	–	23 June 1940
• Major Gotthard Handrick	24 June 1940	–	21 August 1940
• Oberstleutnant Adolf Galland	22 August 1940	–	5 December 1941
• Major Gerhard Schöpfel	6 December 1941	–	10 January 1943
• Oberst Josef Priller	11 January 1943	–	27 January 1945
• Major Franz Götz	28 January 1945	–	7 May 1945

=== I. Gruppe of JG 26 ===
• Hauptmann Oskar Dinort	20 February 1936	–	15 March 1937
• Hauptmann Walter Grabmann	16 March 1937	–	10 May 1938
• Hauptmann Karl-Heinz Leesmann	11 May 1938	–	12 July 1938
• Major Gotthard Handrick	13 July 1938	–	23 June 1940
• Hauptmann Kurt Fischer	24 June 1940	–	21 August 1940
• Hauptmann Rolf Pingel	22 August	–	10 July 1941
• Major Johannes Seifert	11 July 1941	–	31 May 1943 †
• Hauptmann Fritz Losigkeit	1 June 1943	–	22 June 1943
• Hauptmann Karl Borris	23 June 1943	–	14 May 1944
• Hauptmann Hermann Staiger	15 May 1944	–	31 July 1944
• Major Karl Borris	1 August 1944	–	7 May 1945

=== II. Gruppe of JG 26 ===
• Major Eduard Ritter von Schleich	15 May 1937	–	31 October 1938
• Hauptmann Werner Palm	1 November 1938	–	27 June 1939
• Hauptmann Herwig Knüppel	28 June 1939	–	19 May 1940 †
• Hauptmann Karl Ebbighausen	20 May 1940	–	31 May 1940
• Hauptmann Erich Noack	1 June 1940	–	24 July 1940
• Hauptmann Karl Ebbighausen	25 July 1940	–	16 August 1940 †
• Hauptmann Erich Bode	17 August 1940	–	3 October 1940
• Hauptmann Walter Adolph	4 October 1940	–	18 September 1941 †
• Hauptmann Joachim Müncheberg	19 September 1941	–	21 July 1942
• Hauptmann Conny Meyer	22 July 1942	–	2 January 1943
• Major Wilhelm-Ferdinand Galland	3 January 1943	–	17 August 1943 †
• Hauptmann Johannes Naumann	18 August 1943	–	8 September 1943
• Oberleutnant Johannes Seifert	9 September 1943	–	25 November 1943 †
• Major Wilhelm Gäth	26 November 1943	–	1 March 1944
• Hauptmann Johannes Naumann	2 March 1944	–	28 June 1944
• Hauptmann Emil Lang	29 June 1944	–	3 September 1944 †
• Hauptmann Georg-Peter Eder	4 September 1944	–	8 October 1944
• Major Anton Hackl	9 October 1944	–	29 January 1945
• Oberleutnant Waldemar Radener	30 January 1945	–	22 February 1945
• Hauptmann Paul Schauder	23 February 1945	–	1 May 1945

=== III. Gruppe of JG 26 ===
• Hauptmann Walter Kienitz	23 September 1939	–	31 October 1939
• Major Ernst Freiherr von Berg	1 November 1939	–	5 June 1940
• Major Adolf Galland	6 June 1940	–	20 August 1940
• Major Gerhard Schöpfel	21 August 1940	–	5 December 1941
• Hauptmann Josef Priller	6 December 1941	–	10 January 1943
• Hauptmann Friedrich Geißhardt	11 January 1943	–	6 April 1943 †
• Hauptmann Kurt Ruppert	7 April 1943	–	13 June 1943
• Hauptmann Rolf Hermichen	15 June 1943	–	4 July 1943
• Major Klaus Mietusch	5 July 1943	–	17 September 1944 †
• Hauptmann Paul Schauder	18 September 1944	–	26 September 1944
• Hauptmann Walter Krupinski	27 September 1944	–	25 March 1945

=== IV. Gruppe of JG 26 ===
• Major Rudolf Klemm	25 February 1945	–	17 April 1945
