= Rolf Pingel =

German fighter ace and Knight's Cross recipient

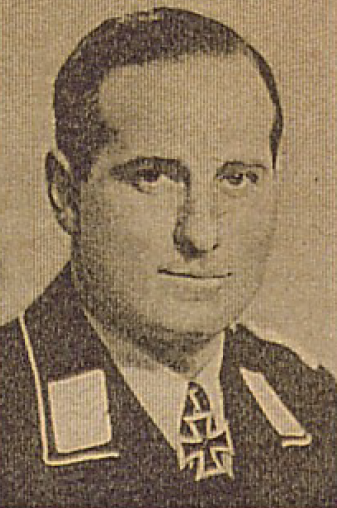
- Born: 1 October 1913; Kiel
- Died: 4 April 2000 (aged 86); Lollar
- Military career
- Allegiance: Nazi Germany
- Branch: Luftwaffe
- Service years: 1934–1945
- Rank: Major (major)
- Units: Condor Legion; JG 53; JG 26
- Commands: III./JG 53; I./JG 26
- Conflicts: See battles Spanish Civil War World War II: Battle of France; Battle of Britain; Defense of the Reich
- Awards: Spanish Cross in Gold with Swords; Knight's Cross of the Iron Cross

Rolf Pingel (1 October 1913 – 4 April 2000) was a German Luftwaffe military aviator and fighter ace during the Spanish Civil War and World War II. He is credited with six aerial victories during the Spanish Civil War and a further 22 aerial victories on the Western Front of World War II. He flew about 550 combat missions, including approximately 200 in Spain.

Born in Kiel, Pingel grew up in the Weimar Republic. He joined the military service in the Luftwaffe and was trained as a fighter pilot. During the Spanish Civil War, he volunteered for service in the Condor Legion. In Spain, he claimed his first aerial victory on 5 June 1937. For his service in Spain, he was decorated with the Spanish Cross in Gold with Swords. During World War II, Pingel claimed his first victory on 10 September 1939 as a squadron leader of 2. Staffel (2nd squadron) of Jagdgeschwader 53 (JG 53–53rd Fighter Wing). In August 1940, Pingel was transferred to Jagdgeschwader 26 "Schlageter" (JG 26—26th Fighter Wing) where he became a group commander. There, he was awarded the Knight's Cross of the Iron Cross on 14 September 1940. On 10 July 1941, his Messerschmitt Bf 109 was damaged in combat, resulting in a forced landing near St Margaret's at Cliffe and was captured by the British Home Guard. He was released in 1947 as a prisoner of war. Pingel died on 4 April 2000 in Lollar, Germany.

== Early life and career ==
Pingel was born 1 October 1913 in Kiel, at the time in the Province of Schleswig-Holstein, a province of the Kingdom of Prussia. In 1935, he began his flight training at Kitzingen Airfield, and was then posted to the Jagdfliegerschule at Schleißheim. After he completed his flight training, he was posted to I. Gruppe (1st group) of Jagdgeschwader 134 "Horst Wessel" (JG 134–134th Fighter Wing) in March 1937.

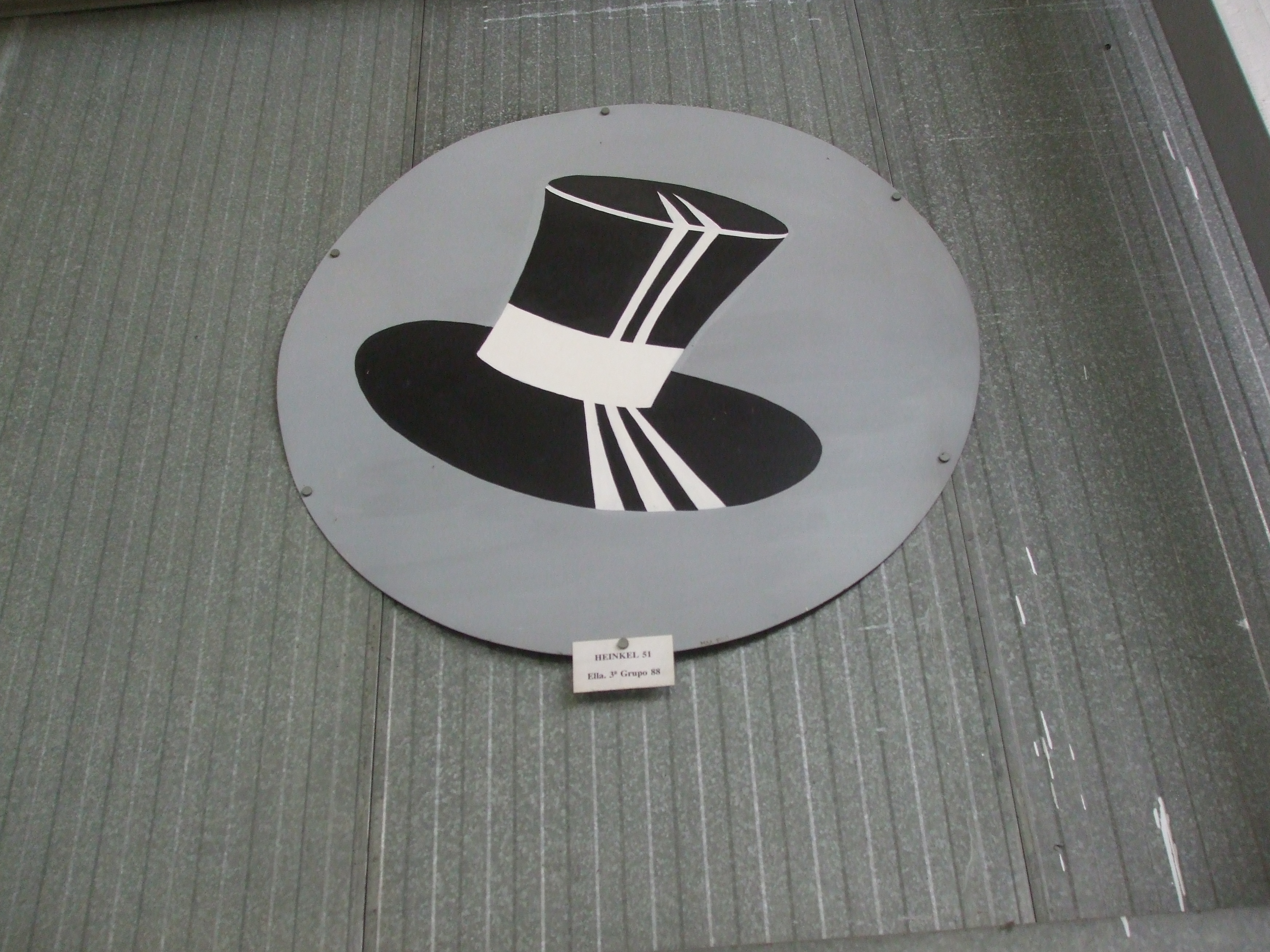
2. Staffel insignia

During the Spanish Civil War, Pingel volunteered for service with the Condor Legion, a unit composed of volunteers from the Luftwaffe and from the Army which served with the Nationalists. There, he was assigned to 2. Staffel (2nd squadron) of Jagdgruppe 88 (J/88—88th Fighter Group) under the command of Oberleutnant Günther Lützow. 2. Staffel was the first squadron to be fully equipped with the then-new Messerschmitt Bf 109. On 8 July, during the Battle of Brunete, Pingel led a flight of three aircraft (Kette) from 2. Staffel on a fighter escort mission for bombers from Kampfgruppe 88 and reconnaissance aircraft from Aufklärungsgruppe 88. Near Aranjuez, the flight encountered five bombers heading towards Ávila. In this encounter, Pingel was credited with shooting down a Tupolev SB-2 bomber. Four days later, he was credited with the destruction of another SB-2 bomber and an escorting Polikarpov I-16 fighter. On 16 July near Fuenlabrada, Pingel shot down another I-16 fighter. Pingel was credited with his sixth and last aerial victory in Spain on 22 August during the Battle of Santander, claiming yet another I-16. He was later awarded the Spanish Cross in Gold with Swords (Spanienkreuz in Gold mit Schwertern) on 14 April 1939 for his service in the Spanish Civil War.

Upon returning from Spain, Pingel was appointed Staffelkapitän (squadron leader) of 2.(leichte Jäger) Staffel of Jagdgeschwader 334 (JG 334–334th Fighter Wing) on 1 October 1938. This squadron was part of I. Gruppe of JG 334 under the command of Major Hans-Hugo Witt. This unit was renamed on 1 November and was then referred to as 2. Staffel of Jagdgeschwader 133 (JG 133–133rd Fighter Wing). On 1 April 1939, it was again renamed, becoming the 2. Staffel of Jagdgeschwader 53 (JG 53–53rd Fighter Wing). In early 1939, the Gruppe started replacing the Bf 109 D-1 with the newer Bf 109 E-1 and E-3 variants, completing the change by March. During the following months, the pilots trained aerial gunnery at Wangerooge Airfield. At the time of the German mobilization on 26 August, the Gruppe was based at Wiesbaden-Erbenheim.

== World War II ==
World War II in Europe had begun on Friday 1 September 1939 when German forces invaded Poland. Still based at Wiesbaden-Erbenheim, I. Gruppe patrolled western German border between Trier and Saarbrücken during the "Phoney War". Pingel claimed his first World War II aerial victory on 10 September when he shot down a French ANF Les Mureaux 113 near Ensdorf. The aircraft belonged to Groupes Aériénnes d'Oberservation 1/506, an aerial reconnaissance unit, which lost three aircraft that day. On 30 September he was credited with the destruction of a Royal Air Force (RAF) Fairey Battle west of Saarbrücken. The Battle belonged to No. 150 Squadron of the Advanced Air Striking Force on a mission to Saarbrücken. At the end of October, the Gruppe was moved to an airfield at Kirchberg to make room at Wiesbaden-Erbenheim for the newly created III. Gruppe of JG 53.

On 5 June, German forces launched Fall Rot (Case Red), the second phase of the conquest of France. That day, Hauptmann Werner Mölders was shot down in combat in the vicinity of Compiègne and taken prisoner of war. Pingel was transferred from 2. Staffel to temporarily command III. Gruppe. On 11 June, JG 53 supported the fighting at the Aisne and near Reims where Pingel shot down two Morane-Saulnier M.S.406 fighters. Following the Armistice of 22 June 1940 Mölders returned to III. Gruppe only to be transferred to take command of Jagdgeschwader 51 (JG 51—51st Fighter Wing). Hauptmann Harro Harder was officially appointed Gruppenkommandeur (group commander) of III. Gruppe and Pingel returned to take command of 2. Staffel.

=== With Jagdgeschwader 26 ===
On 22 August, the Commander-in-Chief of the Luftwaffe, Reichsmarschall Hermann Göring, appointed Major Adolf Galland as Geschwaderkommodore (wing commander) of Jagdgeschwader 26 "Schlageter" (JG 26—26th Fighter Wing). Göring was convinced that the Luftwaffe's failure to defeat the RAF Fighter Command was caused by the lack of aggressiveness on behalf of the Luftwaffe fighter pilots. In consequence, Göring reassigned every Geschwaderkommodore position to younger and more successful men. Galland shared Göring's opinion, and as a first measure had Gruppenkommandeur of I. Gruppe, Hauptmann Kurt Fischer replaced by Pingel.

Pingel claimed his first aerial victories with JG 26 on 29 August. In terms of aerial victories claimed, it was I. Gruppe's most successful mission so far, for the loss of one of their own, the Gruppe claimed five RAF fighters. Pingel accounted for two Spitfire fighters, shot down near Dungeness. On 14 September, two members of JG 26 received the Knight's Cross of the Iron Cross (Ritterkreuz des Eisernen Kreuzes), Oberleutnant Joachim Müncheberg and Pingel. At the time, twenty aerial victories were the requirement for a Knight's Cross nomination. Pingel had not yet reached this figure. Caldwell assumes that Pingel, in parts, received this award for his leadership skills.

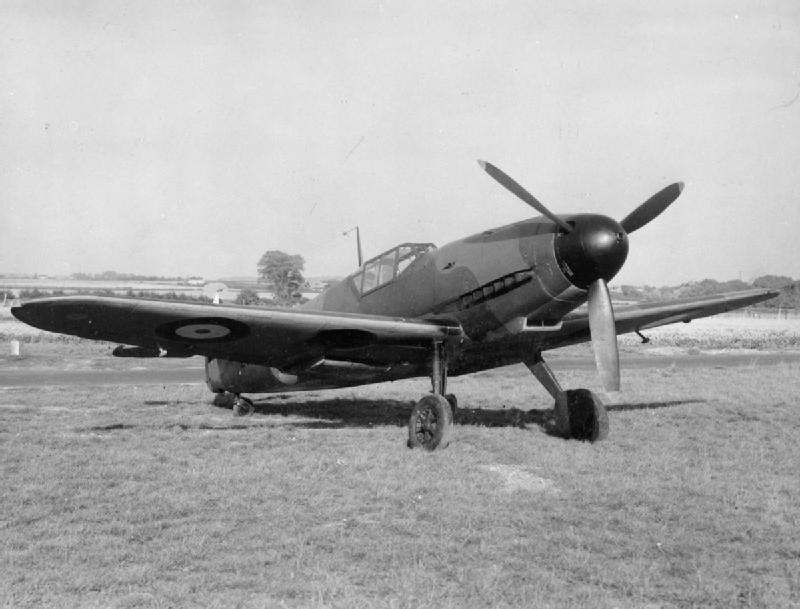
Pingel's captured Bf 109 F-2 (RAF serial ES906) at the Air Fighting Development Unit, RAF Duxford, October 1941.

On 28 September, Pingel shot down a No. 249 Squadron Hawker Hurricane near Maidstone but his Bf 109 E-4 (Werknummer 3756—factory number) was badly damaged, forcing Pingel to ditch off the English coast near Hastings and be rescued by the Seenotdienst (sea rescue service). He claimed his last aerial victory in 1940 on 5 November. In combat with the No. 12 Group's Duxford Wing, Pingel claimed to have shot down a No. 19 Squadron Spitfire east of Gravesend.

On 22 June 1941, the RAF flew "Circus" No. 18 targeting Hazebrouck with six Bristol Blenheim bombers, escorted by Spitfires from No. 609 and No. 611 Squadron. Defending against this attack, Pingel claimed his 20th aerial victory, a Spitfire shot down west of Dunkirk. On 10 July, the RAF sent three Short Stirling bombers as part of "Circus" No. 42 to Chocques. The Luftwaffe dispatched fighters from JG 2 and JG 26 to intercept the bombers and escorting fighters but failed to make contact until the RAF attack force was already returning to England. Pingel, in pursuit of one of the Stirlings, followed the bomber into English airspace and attacked it. He damaged the tail section of the bomber but his Bf 109 F-2 (Werknummer 12764) was hit by the defensive fire of the bomber. He then came under attack from a Spitfire which resulted in him making a forced landing near Dover and St Margaret's at Cliffe. He was taken prisoner by a detachment of Home Guard. During his captivity, Pingel was promoted to Major (major) and taken to Canada as a prisoner of war. He was released in 1947.

Pingel's aircraft, the Bf 109 F–2, was returned to flying condition by the RAF and allocated the serial number ES906. It was briefly flown for evaluation testing until it crashed near Fowlmere on 20 October 1941, killing its Polish pilot Flight Officer Marian J. Skalski.

== Later life ==
Pingel died on 4 April 2000 at the age of 86 in Lollar, Germany.

== Summary of career ==
=== Aerial victory claims ===
According to Obermaier, Pingel flew 550 combat missions, 200 of which during the Spanish Civil War. He was credited with 28 aerial victories, six in the Spanish Civil War and another 22 in World War II. Mathews and Foreman, authors of Luftwaffe Aces — Biographies and Victory Claims, researched the German Federal Archives and found records for 27 aerial victory claims. This number includes six claims during the Spanish Civil War, and further 21 over the Western Allies of World War II.

Chronicle of aerial victories
This and the ? (question mark) indicates information discrepancies listed by Caldwell, Forsyth, Prien, Stemmer, Rodeike, Bock, Mathews and Foreman.
Claim	Date	Time	Type	Location	Claim	Date	Time	Type	Location
Spanish Civil War
– 2. Staffel of Jagdgruppe 88 – Spanish Civil War — July – December 1938
1? (Note: According to Forsyth this claim is unconfirmed.)	5 June 1937	—	I-15	San Julián de Musques	4	12 July 1937	—	I-16	
2	8 July 1937	—	SB-2		5	16 July 1937	—	I-16	
3	12 July 1937	—	SB-2		6	22 August 1937	—	I-16	
World War II
– 2. Staffel of Jagdgeschwader 53 – "Phoney War" — 1 September 1939 – 9 May 1940
1	10 September 1939	14:15	Mureaux 113	Ensdorf	2	30 September 1939	11:50	Battle	west of Saarbrücken
– 2. Staffel of Jagdgeschwader 53 – Battle of France — 10 May – 5 June 1940
3	14 May 1940	11:20? (Note: According to Mathews and Foreman claimed at 11:30.)	MB.151	south of Sedan	5	14 May 1940	16:30	Battle	Sedan
4	14 May 1940	11:22	MB.151	south of Sedan	6	26 May 1940	10:55	Hurricane	
– Stab III. Gruppe of Jagdgeschwader 53 – Battle of France — 5–20 June 1940
7	11 June 1940	11:55? (Note: According to Mathews and Foreman claimed at 11:50.)	M.S.406	Reims-Épernay	8	11 June 1940	12:10	M.S.406	southwest of Épernay
– 2. Staffel of Jagdgeschwader 53 – At the Channel and over England — 26 June – 21 August 1940
9? (Note: This claim is not listed by Mathews and Foreman.)	15 August 1940	—	Hurricane		10	18 August 1940	15:32	Spitfire	
– Stab I. Gruppe of Jagdgeschwader 26 "Schlageter" – At the Channel and over England — 22 August 1940 – 21 June 1941
11	29 August 1940	20:06	Spitfire	Dungeness	16	28 September 1940	14:40	Hurricane	Maidstone
12	29 August 1940	20:07	Spitfire	Dungeness	17	5 November 1940	17:05	Spitfire	east of Gravesend
13	31 August 1940	18:45	Spitfire	south of London	18	16 June 1941	16:35	Blenheim	southeast of Boulogne
14	7 September 1940	19:25	Spitfire	Tonbridge	19	16 June 1941	16:52	Spitfire	south of Dungeness
15	14 September 1940	16:50	Hurricane	southeast of Maidstone					
– Stab I. Gruppe of Jagdgeschwader 26 "Schlageter" – At the Channel and over England — 22 June – 10 July 1941
20	22 June 1941	16:10	Spitfire	west of Dunkirk	22	2 July 1941	12:50	Spitfire	south of Dunkirk
21	27 June 1941	21:43	Spitfire	Roubaix					

=== Awards ===
- Spanish Cross in Gold with Swords (14 April 1939)
- Iron Cross (1939) 2nd and 1st Class
- Knight's Cross of the Iron Cross on 14 September 1940 as Hauptmann and Gruppenkommandeur of the I./Jagdgeschwader 26 "Schlageter"

== Notes ==
Military offices
Preceded by Hauptmann Werner Mölders	Commander of III. Jagdgeschwader 53; June 1940 – July 1940	Succeeded by Hauptmann Harro Harder
Preceded by Hauptmann Kurt Fischer	Commander of I. Jagdgeschwader 26; 22 August 1940 – 10 July 1941	Succeeded by Major Johannes Seifert
