= Focke-Wulf Fw 190 =

1939 fighter aircraft family by Focke-Wulf

Fw 190
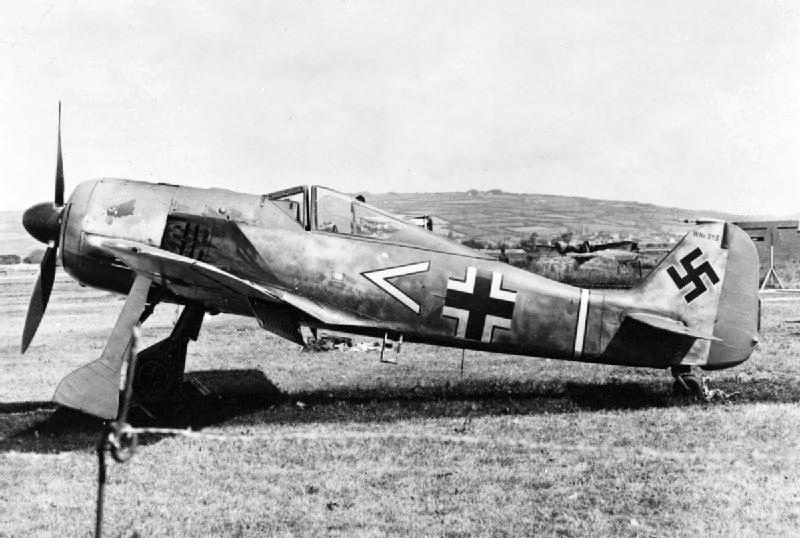
- Fw 190A-3 of Stab. 7./JG2, June 1942 (Note: This A-3 was landed by mistake by Oblt Armin Faber at RAF Pembrey on June 23, 1942, becoming the first Fw 190 to be captured and tested by the RAF.)

General information
- Type: Fighter aircraft
- National origin: Germany
- Manufacturer: Focke-Wulf
- Designer: Kurt Tank
- Primary users: Luftwaffe: Hungarian Air Force; Turkish Air Force
- Number built: Over 20,000

History
- Manufactured: 1941–1945 (65 produced post-War for French Air Force)
- Introduction date: August 1941
- First flight: 1 June 1939
- Retired: 9 May 1945 (Luftwaffe); 1945 (Hungary); 1947 (Turkey); 1949 (France)
- Developed into: Focke-Wulf Ta 152

The Focke-Wulf Fw 190, nicknamed Würger (Note: "The Fw 190 has to be regarded as one of the best single-seat fighters of the war. Its combat performance, adaptability, to a variety of operational scenarios, and ease of handling and maintenance made it a true fighter, earning it the nickname Würger – Butcher Bird.") (lit. 'Shrike') is a German single-seat, single-engined, fighter aircraft designed by Kurt Tank at Focke-Wulf in the late 1930s; it was widely used during World War II. Along with its well-known counterpart, the Messerschmitt Bf 109, the Fw 190 became the backbone of the Jagdwaffe (Fighter Force) of the Luftwaffe. The twin-row BMW 801 radial engine that powered most operational versions enabled the Fw 190 to lift larger loads than the Bf 109, allowing its use as a day fighter, fighter-bomber, ground-attack aircraft, or to a lesser degree, night fighter.

The Fw 190A started flying operationally over France in August 1941 and quickly proved superior in all but turn radius to the Spitfire Mk. V, the main front-line fighter of the Royal Air Force (RAF), particularly at low and medium altitudes. The 190 maintained its superiority over Allied fighters until the late 1942 and early 1943 introduction of the improved Spitfire Mk. IX. In November/December 1942, the Fw 190 made its air-combat debut on the Eastern Front, finding much success in fighter wings and specialised ground-attack units (Schlachtgeschwader – Battle Wings or Strike Wings) from October 1943.

The Fw 190A series' performance decreased at high altitudes (usually 6,000 m [20,000 ft] and above), which reduced its effectiveness as a high-altitude interceptor. From the Fw 190's inception, efforts had been going on to address this with a turbocharged BMW 801 in the B model, the much longer-nosed C model with efforts to also turbocharge its chosen Daimler-Benz DB 603 inverted V12 powerplant, and the similarly long-nosed D model with the Junkers Jumo 213. Problems with the turbocharger installations on the -B and -C subtypes meant only the D model entered service, in September 1944. These high-altitude developments eventually led to the Focke-Wulf Ta 152, which was capable of extreme speeds at medium to high altitudes (755 km/h [408 kn; 469 mph] at 13,500 m [44,300 ft]). While these "long nose" 190 variants and the Ta 152 derivative especially gave the Germans parity with Allied opponents, they arrived too late to affect the outcome of the war.

The Fw 190 was well-liked by its pilots. Some of the Luftwaffe's most successful fighter aces claimed many of their kills while flying it, including Otto Kittel, Walter Nowotny, and Erich Rudorffer. The Fw 190 had greater firepower than the Bf 109, and at low to medium altitude, superior manoeuvrability in the opinion of German pilots who flew both fighters. It was regarded as one of the best fighter planes of World War II.

== Early development ==
=== Genesis ===
Between 1934 and 1935, the German Ministry of Aviation (RLM) ran a contest to produce a modern fighter for the rearming Luftwaffe. Kurt Tank entered the parasol-winged Fw 159 into the contest, against the Arado Ar 80, Heinkel He 112, and Messerschmitt Bf 109. The Fw 159 was hopelessly outclassed and was soon eliminated from the competition along with the Ar 80. The He 112 and Bf 109 were generally similar in design, but the 109's lightweight construction gave it a performance edge the 112 was never able to match. On 12 March 1936, the 109 was declared the winner.

Even before the Bf 109 had entered squadron service, in autumn 1937, the RLM sent out a new tender asking various designers for a new fighter to fight alongside the Bf 109, as Walter Günther had done with Heinkel's follow-on to the unsuccessful He 100 and He 112. Although the Bf 109 was an extremely competitive fighter, the ministry was worried that future foreign designs might outclass it, so wanted to have new aircraft under development to meet these possible challenges. Tank responded with a number of designs, most powered by a liquid-cooled, inline engine.

The Ministry of Aviation's interest was not aroused, though, until a design was presented using the air-cooled, 14-cylinder BMW 139 radial engine. As this design used a radial engine, it did not compete with the inline-powered Bf 109 for engines, when already too few Daimler-Benz DB 601s were available. This was not the case for competing designs such as the Heinkel He 100 or twin-engined Focke-Wulf Fw 187, where production would compete with the 109 and Messerschmitt Bf 110 for engine supplies. After the war, Tank denied a rumour that he had to "fight a battle" with the ministry to convince them of the radial engine's merits.

=== Design concepts ===
At the time, the use of radial engines in land-based fighters was relatively rare in Europe, as their large frontal area was believed to cause too much drag on something as small as a fighter. Tank was not convinced of this, having witnessed the successful use of radial engines by the U.S. Navy, and felt a properly streamlined installation would eliminate this problem.

As to the rest of the design philosophy, Tank wanted something more than an aircraft built only for speed. He outlined the reasoning:

The Messerschmitt 109 [sic] and the British Spitfire, the two fastest fighters in the world at the time we began work on the Fw 190, could both be summed up as a very large engine on the front of the smallest possible airframe; in each case, armament had been added almost as an afterthought. These designs, both of which admittedly proved successful, could be likened to racehorses; given the right amount of pampering and easy course, they could outrun anything. But the moment the going became tough they were liable to falter. During World War I, I served in the cavalry and in the infantry. I had seen the harsh conditions under which military equipment had to work in wartime. I felt sure that a quite different breed of fighter would also have a place in any future conflict: one that could operate from ill-prepared front-line airfields, one that could be flown and maintained by men who had received only short training, and one that could absorb a reasonable amount of battle damage and still get back. This was the background thinking behind the Focke-Wulf 190; it was not to be a racehorse, but a Dienstpferd, a cavalry horse.

==== Engine ====
The hottest points on any air-cooled engine are the cylinder heads, located around the circumference of a radial engine. To provide sufficient air to cool the engine, airflow had to be maximized at this outer edge. This was normally accomplished by leaving the majority of the front face of the engine open to the air, causing considerable drag. During the late 1920s, NACA led the development of a dramatic improvement by placing an airfoil-shaped ring around the outside of the cylinder heads (the NACA cowling). The shaping accelerated the air as it entered the front of the cowl, increasing the total airflow and allowing the opening in front of the engine to be made smaller.

Tank introduced a further refinement to this basic concept. He suggested placing most of the airflow components on the propeller, in the form of an oversized propeller spinner, whose outside diameter was the same as the engine. The cowl around the engine proper was greatly simplified, essentially a basic cylinder. Air entered through a small gap in the front of the cowl and was directed through ductwork in the cowl, so it was blowing rearward along the cylinder heads. The propeller spinner helped to compress the airflow and allow a smaller opening to be used. In theory, the tight-fitting cowling also provided some thrust due to the compression and heating of air as it flowed through the cowling.

The eventual choice of the BMW 801 14-cylinder radial over the more troublesome BMW 139 also brought with it a BMW-designed cowling "system", which integrated the radiator used to cool the motor oil. An annular, ring-shaped oil cooler core was built into the BMW-provided forward cowl, just behind the fan. The outer portion of the oil cooler's core was in contact with the main cowling's sheet metal. Comprising the BMW-designed forward cowl, in front of the oil cooler was a ring of metal with a C-shaped cross-section, with the outer lip lying just outside the rim of the cowl, and the inner side on the inside of the oil cooler core. Together, the metal ring and cowling formed an S-shaped duct with the oil cooler's core contained between them. Airflow past the gap between the cowl and outer lip of the metal ring produced a vacuum effect that pulled air from the front of the engine forward across the oil cooler core to provide cooling for the 801's motor oil. The rate of cooling airflow over the core could be controlled by moving the metal ring to open or close the gap. The reasons for this complex system were threefold. One was to reduce any extra aerodynamic drag of the oil radiator, in this case largely eliminating it by placing it within the same cowling as the engine. The second was to warm the air before it flowed to the radiator to aid in warming the oil during starting. Finally, by placing the radiator behind the fan, cooling was provided even while the aircraft was parked. The disadvantage to this design was that the radiator was in an extremely vulnerable location, and the metal ring was increasingly armoured as the war progressed.

==== Landing gear ====
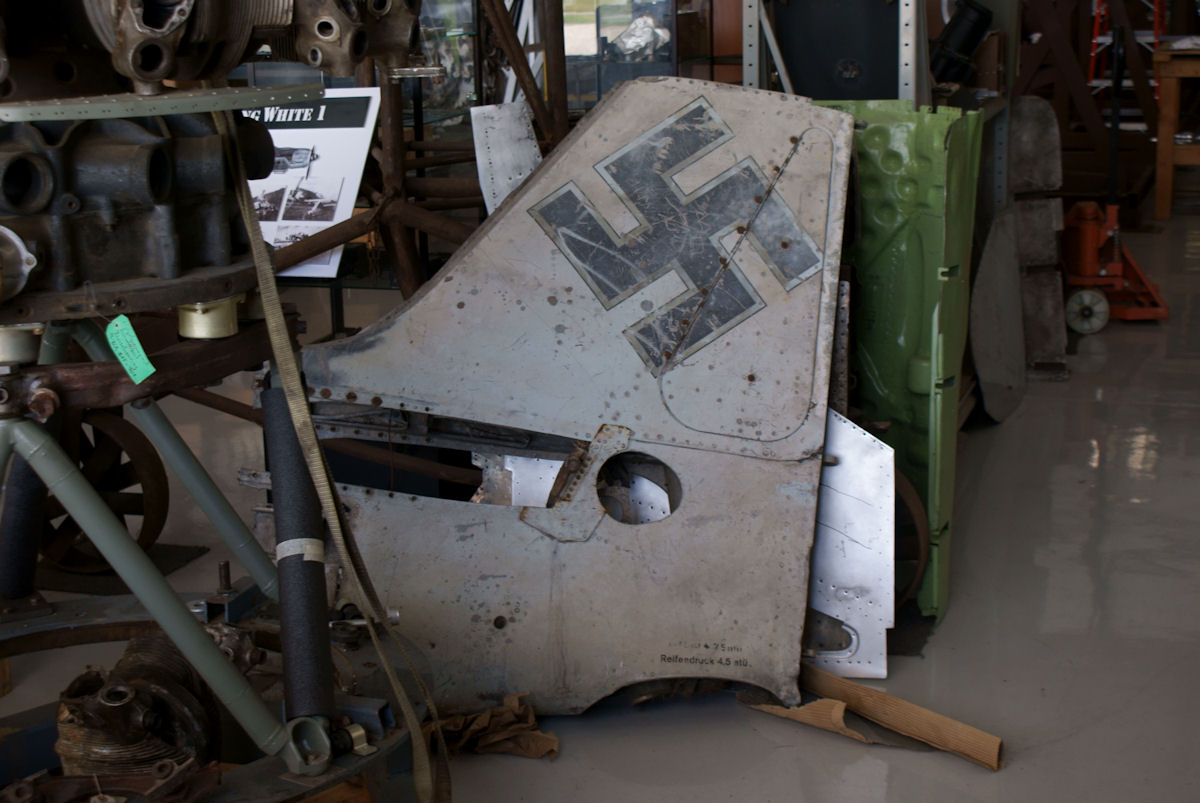
An Fw 190F's tailfin, showing the triangular hinged panel for access to the tailwheel retraction mechanism inside of it

In contrast to the complex, failure-prone, fuselage-mounted main gear legs of the earlier Fw 159, one of the main features of the Fw 190 was its wide-tracked, inwards-retracting landing gear. They were designed to withstand a sink rate of 4.5 metres per second (15 ft/s; 890 ft/min), double the strength factor usually required. Hydraulic wheel brakes were used. The wide-track undercarriage produced better ground handling characteristics, and the Fw 190 suffered fewer ground accidents than the Bf 109. (The Bf 109's narrow-track, outwards-retracting landing gear hinged on its wing root structure to help lower weight, but this led to inherent weakness and many failures and ground loops.) The Fw 190's retractable tail gear used a cable, anchored to the "elbow" at the midpoint of the starboard maingear's transverse retraction arms, which ran aftward within the fuselage to the vertical fin to operate the tailwheel retraction function. The tailwheel's retraction mechanical design possessed a set of pulleys to guide the aforementioned cable to the top of the tailwheel's oleo strut, pulling it upwards along a diagonal track within the fin, into the lower fuselage; this mechanism was accessible through a prominently visible triangular-shaped hinged panel, on the left side in the fin's side sheetmetal covering. (Note: On all versions of the Fw 190A a wire cable was attached to the middle trunnion of the right [main landing gear] strut, this leading to the tailwheel. When the main landing gear was retracted, this cable raised the air/oil tailwheel leg.) On some versions of the Fw 190, an extended tailwheel oleo strut could be fitted for larger-sized loads (such as bombs or even a torpedo) beneath the fuselage.

==== Control systems ====
Most aircraft of the era used cables and pulleys to operate their controls. The cables tended to stretch, resulting in the sensations of "give" and "play" that made the controls less crisp and responsive, and required constant maintenance to correct. For the new design, the team replaced the cables with rigid pushrods and bearings to eliminate this problem. (Note: Pushrods had been used for the ailerons and elevator surfaces of the all-metal German Junkers D.I low-winged monoplane fighter, which flew near the end of World War I.) Another innovation was making the controls as light as possible. The maximum resistance of the ailerons was limited to 3.5 kg (8 lb), as the average man's wrist could not exert a greater force. The empennage (tail assembly) featured relatively small and well-balanced horizontal and vertical surfaces.

The design team also attempted to minimize changes in the aircraft's trim at varying speeds, thus reducing the pilot's workload. They were so successful in this regard that they found in-flight-adjustable aileron and rudder trim tabs were not necessary. Small, fixed tabs were fitted to control surfaces and adjusted for proper balance during initial test flights. Only the elevator trim needed to be adjusted in flight (a feature common to all aircraft). This was accomplished by tilting the entire horizontal tailplane with an electric motor, with an angle of incidence ranging from −3 to +5°.

Another aspect of the new design was the extensive use of electrically powered equipment instead of the hydraulic systems used by most aircraft manufacturers of the time. On the first two prototypes, the main landing gear was hydraulic. Starting with the third prototype, the undercarriage was operated by push buttons controlling electric motors in the wings, and was kept in position by electric up-and-down locks. The armament was also loaded and fired electrically. Tank believed that service use would prove that electrically powered systems were more reliable and more rugged than hydraulics, electric lines being much less prone to damage from enemy fire.

==== Wing loading and canopy ====
Like the Bf 109, the Fw 190 featured a fairly small wing planform with relatively high wing loading. This presents a trade-off in performance. An aircraft with a smaller wing suffers less drag under most flight conditions, so flies faster and may have better range, but it also means the aircraft has a higher stalling speed, making it less maneuverable, and also reduces performance in the thinner air at higher altitudes. The wings spanned 9.5 m (31 ft 2 in) and had an area of 15 m^{2} (160 sq ft). The wing was designed using the NACA 23015.3 airfoil at the root and the NACA 23009 airfoil at the tip.

Earlier aircraft designs generally featured canopies consisting of small plates of perspex (also known as Plexiglas) in a metal "greenhouse" framework, with the top of the canopy even with the rear fuselage; this was true of the IJNAS Mitsubishi A6M Zero, whose otherwise "all-around view" canopy was still heavily framed. This design considerably limited visibility, especially to the rear. The introduction of vacuum forming led to the creation of the "bubble canopy", which was largely self-supporting and could be mounted over the cockpit, offering greatly improved all-round visibility. Tank's design for the Fw 190 used a canopy with a frame that ran around the perimeter, with only a short, centerline seam along the top, running rearward from the radio antenna fitting where the three-panel windscreen and the forward edge of the canopy met, just in front of the pilot.

=== Wilde Sau ===
From mid-1943, Fw 190s were also used as night fighters against the growing RAF Bomber Command offensive. In mid-1943, one of the earliest participants in the single-engined, ground controlled, night-fighting experiments was the Nachtjagdkommando Fw 190 (Night Fighter Command Fw 190), operated by IV. Gruppe (4 Group), Jagdgeschwader 3, (Fighter Wing 3, or JG 3). The main Nachtgeschwader (Night Fighter Wings) were keen to adopt a new fighter type as their twin-engined fighters were too slow for combat against increasing numbers of de Havilland Mosquito night fighters and bombers. Nachtjagdgeschwader 1 (NJG 1) and NJG 3 kept two Fw 190s on standby to supplement the Messerschmitt Bf 110 and Junkers Ju 88. The considerable performance advantage of the Fw 190 over the other two types was more than offset by the difficulties of operating at night. Few, if any, aerial successes can be attributed to these operational tests.

One of the first purpose-built units to use Fw 190s in this role was Stab/Versuchskommando Herrmann, a unit specifically set up in April 1943 by Major Hajo Herrmann. Herrmann's unit used standard A-4s and A-5s borrowed from day-fighter units to intercept bombers over or near the targeted city, using searchlights and other visual aids to help them find their quarry. The first use of "Window" by the RAF during the Battle of Hamburg in July 1943, rendered the standard night fighter Himmelbett procedures useless and brought urgency to the development of Herrmann's Wilde Sau ("Wild Boar") technique, pending the development of new night fighting strategies. Instead of restricting the Fw 190s to ground control interception protocols, they were given a free hand to over-fly bombed areas to see if they could locate bombers using the ground fires below. These tactics became an integral part of the night fighter operations until May 1944.

St/V Herrmann was expanded to become Jagdgeschwader 300 (JG 300, or Fighter Wing 300), JG 301 and JG 302. All three units initially continued borrowing their aircraft from day-fighter units, which began to protest at the numbers of their aircraft that were being written off because of the hazards of night operations; the numbers soared with the onset of winter, with pilots often being forced to bail out through being unable to find an airfield at which to land safely. Crash landings were also frequent. Eventually, all three Wilde Sau units received their own aircraft, which were often modified with exhaust dampers and blind-flying radio equipment. Another unit was Nachtjagdgruppe 10, which used Fw 190 A-4/R11s through to A-8/R11s; Fw 190s modified to carry FuG (Funkgerät) 217 or FuG 218 radar mid-VHF band equipment.

=== The Sturmböcke ===
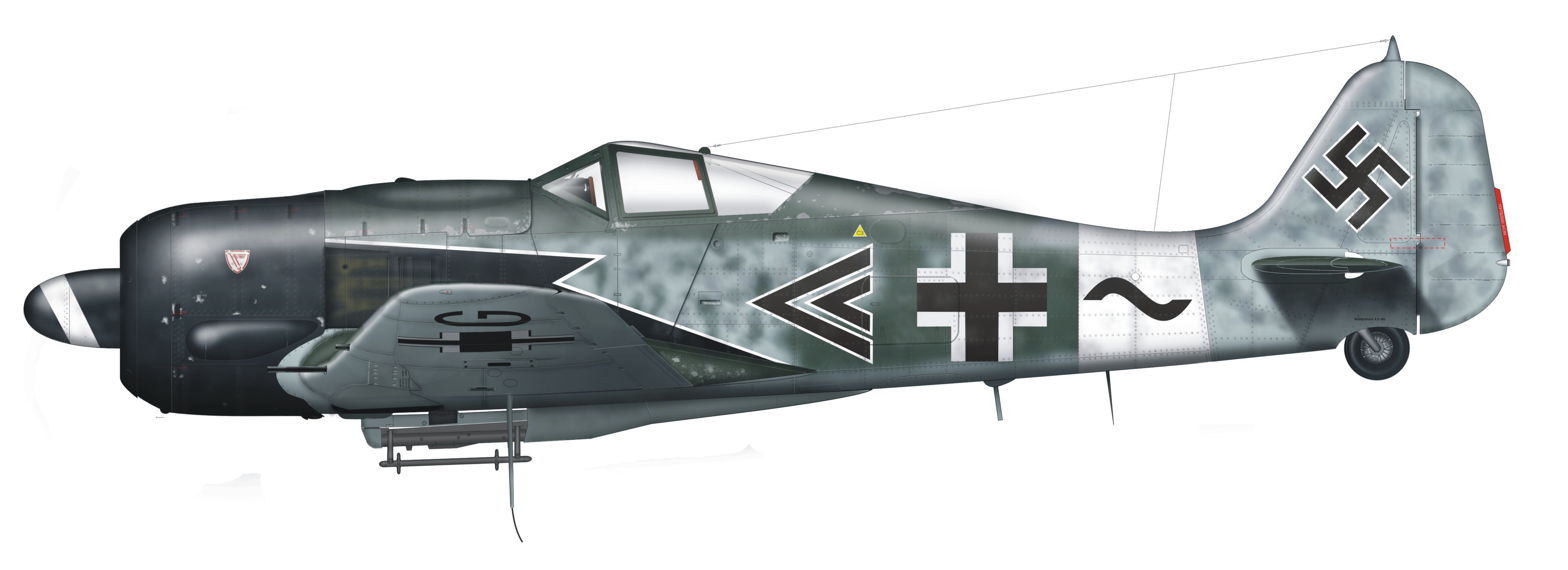
Fw 190 A-8/R8 of IV.(Sturm)/JG 3, flown by Hptm. Wilhelm Moritz

The appearance of United States Army Air Forces (USAAF) heavy bombers caused a problem for the German fighter force. The Boeing B-17 Flying Fortress, in particular, was especially durable, and the armaments of the Bf 109 and Fw 190 were not adequate for bomber-destroyer operations. The B-17's eventual deployment in combat box formations provided formidable, massed firepower from 100 or more Browning AN/M2 .50 caliber (12.7 mm) machine guns. In addition, the Luftwaffe's original solution of Zerstörer twin-engined Messerschmitt Bf 110G bomber destroyers, while effective against unescorted Allied bomber formations, lacked maneuverability and were eviscerated by the USAAF's fighter escorts in late 1943 and early 1944.

Two of the former Wilde Sau single-engined night fighter wings were reconstituted for their use, such as Jagdgeschwader 300 (JG 300—300th Fighter Wing) and JG 301. These units consisted of Sturmböcke. However, JG 3 also had a special Gruppe (group) of Sturmböcke.

The Fw 190, designed as a rugged interceptor capable of withstanding considerable combat damage and delivering a potent "punch" from its stable gun platform, was considered ideal for antibomber operations. Focke-Wulf redesigned parts of the wing structure to accommodate larger armament. The Fw 190 A-6 was the first subvariant to undergo this change. Its standard armament was increased from four MG 151/20s to two of them with four more in two underwing cannon pods. The aircraft was designated A-6/R1 (Rüstsatz; or field conversion model). The first aircraft were delivered on 20 November 1943. Brief trials had the twin cannon replaced by the MK 108 30 mm autocannon in the outer wing, which then became the A-6/R2. The cannons were blowback-operated, had electric ignition, and were belt fed. The 30 mm MK 108 was simple to make, and its construction was economical; most of its components consisted of just pressed sheetmetal stampings. In the A-6/R4, the GM-1 (nitrous oxide) boost was added for the BMW 801 engine to increase performance at high altitude. For protection, 30 millimetres (1.2 in) of armoured glass were added to the canopy. The A-6/R6 was fitted with twin, heavy-calibre Werfer-Granate 21 (BR 21) unguided, air-to-air rockets, fired from single underwing tubular launchers (one per wing panel). The increased modifications, in particular heavy firepower, made the Fw 190 a potent bomber-killer. The A-7 evolved in November 1943. Two synchronized 13 mm (.51 inch) MG 131 machine guns replaced the twin, cowl-mount, synchronized 7.92 mm (.318 inch) MG 17 machine guns. The A-7/R variants could carry two 30 mm MK 108s, as well as BR 21 rockets. This increased its potency as a Pulk-Zerstörer (bomber formation destroyer). The A-8/R2 was the most numerous Sturmbock aircraft; some 900 were built by Fiesler at Kassel with 30 mm MK 108s installed in their outer wing panel mounts.

While formidable bomber-killers, the armour and substantial up-gunning with heavier-calibre firepower meant the Fw 190 was now cumbersome to maneuver. Vulnerable to Allied fighters, they had to be escorted by Bf 109s. When the Sturmgruppe was able to work as intended, the effects were devastating. With their engines and cockpits heavily armored, the Fw 190 As attacked from astern and gun camera films show that these attacks were often pressed to within 100 yds (90 m).

Willy Unger of 11.(Sturm)/JG 3 (11 Staffel (Squadron) of Sturmgruppe (Storm group) JG 3) made these comments:

Advantages; wide undercarriage, large twin-row radial engine, which protected the pilot from the front, electric starter motor and electric trim system. Disadvantages; a danger of turning over existed when braking hard on soft or sandy ground. In combat against enemy fighters, more awkward because of the heavy armour plating. Strong at low altitude, inferior to the Bf 109 at higher altitude. In my opinion the Fw 190, in this version, was the best aircraft used in the formation against the Viermots ["four-motors"].

Richard Franz commented:

When we made our attack, we approached from slightly above, then dived, opening fire with 13 mm and 20 mm guns to knock out the rear gunner and then, at about 150 m, we tried to engage with the MK 108 30 mm cannon, which was a formidable weapon. It could cut the wing off a B-17. Actually, it was still easier to kill a B-24, which was somewhat weaker in respect of fuselage strength and armament. I think we generally had the better armament and ammunition, whereas they had the better aircraft.

The number of heavy bombers destroyed by the Fw 190 is impossible to estimate. However, below is a list of the top-scoring Sturmbock pilots:

Name	Total victory claims	Heavy bomber claims	B-17 claims
Georg-Peter Eder	78	Est. 36	unknown
Anton Hackl	192	Est. 34	Unknown
Konrad Bauer	57	32	Unknown
Walther Dahl	128	30	Unknown
Egon Mayer †	102	26	21
Hermann Staiger	63	26	21
Willy Unger	24	21	13
Hugo Frey †	32	25	19
Hans Ehlers †	55	24	18
Alwin Doppler	29	25	16
Werner Gerth †	27	22	16
Friedrich-Karl Müller †	140	23	15
Hans Weik	36	22	15
Walter Loos	38	22	Unknown
Heinz Bär	221	21	11
Emil-Rudolf Schnoor	32	18	15

== Variants ==
=== First prototypes (BMW 139) ===
Fw 190 V1 in its original form with the streamlined engine cowling and ducted spinner: The pointed tip of the internal spinner can also be seen. The pilot is probably Hans Sander.

Fw 190 V1
(civil registration D-OPZE), powered by a 1,550 PS (1,530 hp; 1,140 kW) BMW 139 14-cylinder, two-row radial engine. D-OPZE first flew on 1 June 1939.
Fw 190 V2
Designated with the Stammkennzeichen alphabetic ID code of FL+OZ (later RM+CB) the V2 first flew on October 31, 1939, and was equipped from the outset with the new spinner and cooling fan. It was armed with one Rheinmetall-Borsig 7.92 mm (0.312 in) MG 17 machine gun and one 13 mm (0.51 in) synchronized MG 131 machine gun in each wing root.
Fw 190 V3
Abandoned
Fw 190 V4
Abandoned

=== Later prototypes (BMW 801) ===
Fw 190 V5k: This is the V5 with the original small wing. The 12-blade cooling fan and redesigned undercarriage and canopy fairings are visible.

Fw 190 V5
Fitted with the larger, more powerful 14-cylinder, two-row BMW 801 radial engine, this engine introduced a pioneering example of an engine management system called the Kommandogerät (command device) designed by BMW, which also designed the 801's forward cowling with its integral oil cooling system: the Kommandogerät functioned in effect as an electro-mechanical computer which set mixture, propeller pitch (for the constant-speed propeller), boost, and magneto timing.
Fw 190 V5k
(kleine Fläche – small surface) The smaller span initial variant re-designated after the longer span wing was fitted. The V5 first flew in the early spring of 1940. The weight increase with all of the modifications was substantial, about 635 kg (1,400 lb), leading to higher wing loading and a deterioration in handling. Plans were made to create a new wing with more area to address these issues.
Fw 190 V5g
(große Fläche – large surface) In August 1940, a collision with a ground vehicle damaged the V5 and it was sent back to the factory for major repairs. This was an opportune time to rebuild it with a new wing, which was less tapered in plan than the original design, extending the leading and trailing edges outward to increase the area. The new wing had an area of 18.30 m^{2} (197.0 sq ft), and now spanned 10.506 m (34 ft 5.6 in). After conversion, the aircraft was called the V5g for große Fläche (large surface). Although it was 10 km/h (6.2 mph) slower than when fitted with the small wing, V5g was much more manoeuvrable and had a faster climb rate. This new wing platform was to be used for all major production versions of the Fw 190.

=== Fw 190 A ===
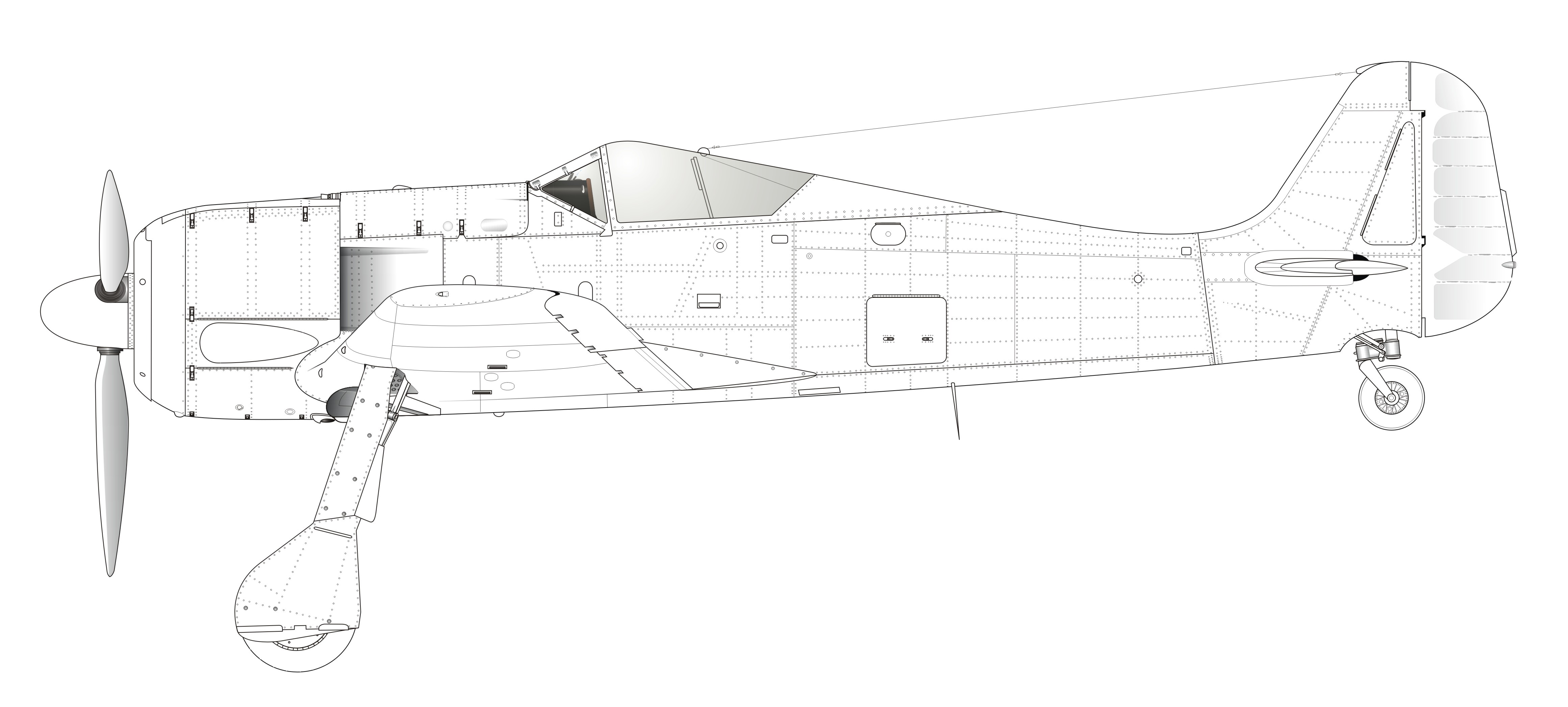
Side-view of Fw 190 A-0

Fw 190 A-0
The preproduction Fw 190 A-0 series was ordered in November 1940, with a total of 28 completed. Because they were built before the new wing design was fully tested and approved, the first nine A-0s retained the original small wings. All were armed with six 7.92 mm (0.312 in) MG 17 machine guns – four synchronised weapons, two in the forward fuselage and one in each wing root, supplemented by a free-firing MG 17 in each wing, outboard of the propeller disc.

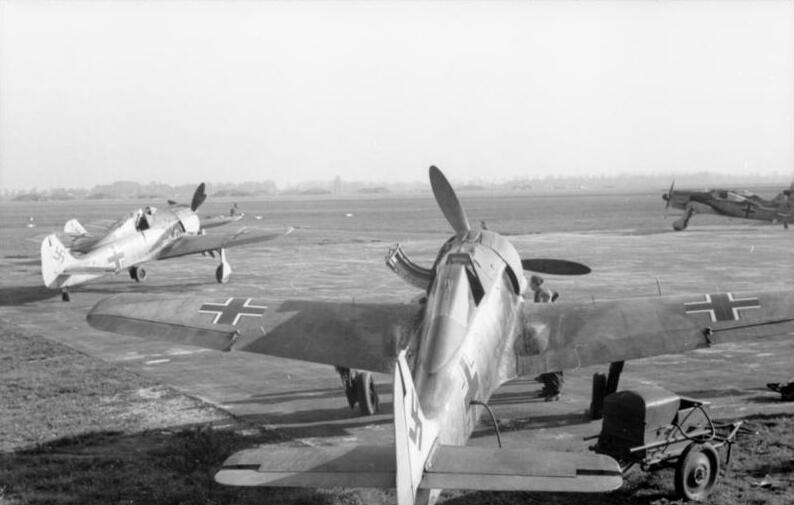
Fw 190 A-0s or A-1s of an unknown unit in France

Fw 190 A-1
The Fw 190 A-1 was in production from June 1941. It was powered by the BMW 801 C-1 engine, rated at 1,560 PS (1,539 hp; 1,147 kW) for take-off. Armament included two fuselage-mounted 7.92 mm (0.312 in) MG 17s and two wing root-mounted 7.92 mm (0.312 in) MG 17s (with all four MG 17s synchronized to fire through the propeller arc) and two outboard wing-mounted 20 mm MG FF/Ms.

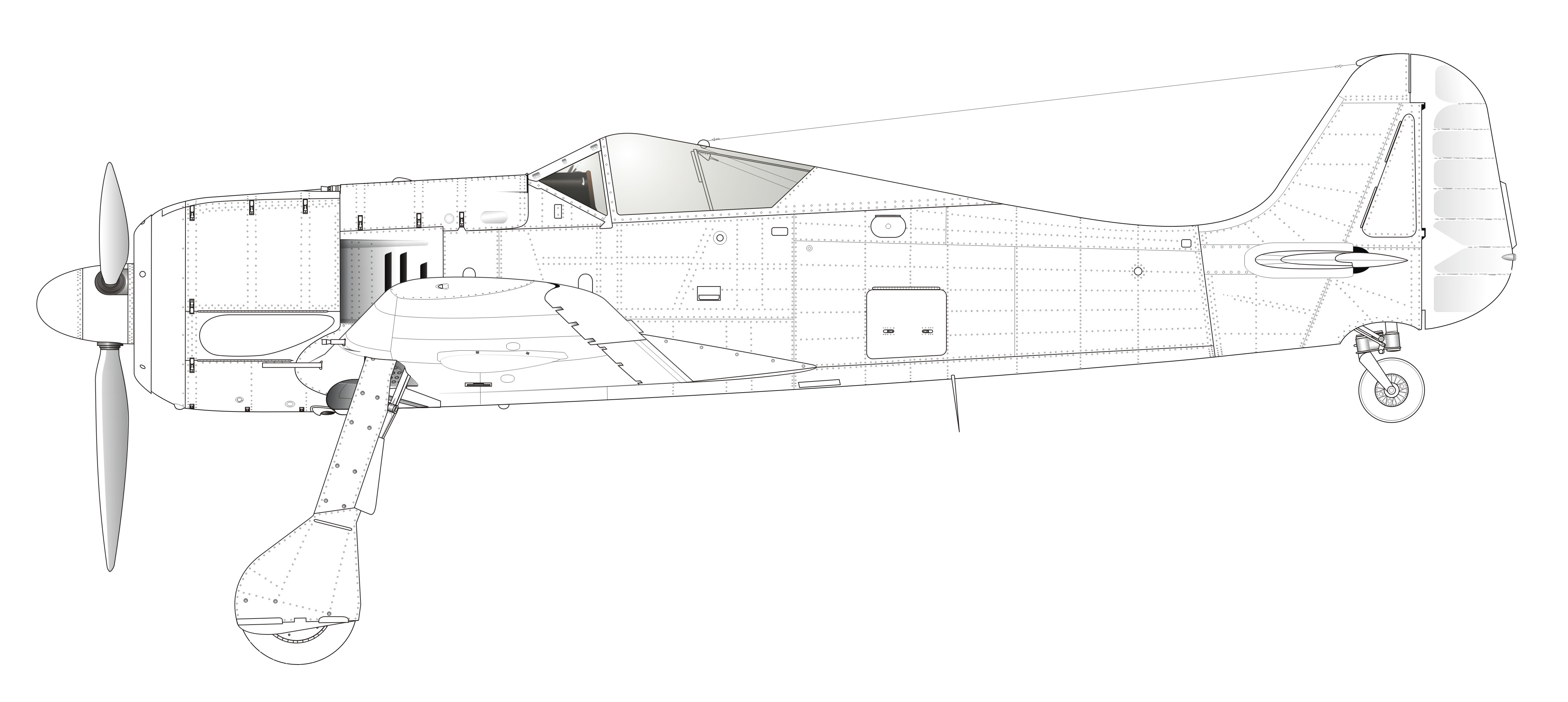
Side-view of Fw 190 A-2; the most notable change over the A-0 was the addition of three vertical cooling slits on the engine cowling, just forward of the wing.

Fw 190 A-2
The introduction of the BMW 801 C-2 resulted in the Fw 190 A-2 model, first introduced in October 1941. The A-2 wing weaponry was updated, with the two wing root-mounted 7.92 mm (0.312 in) MG 17s being replaced by 20 mm MG 151/20E cannon.

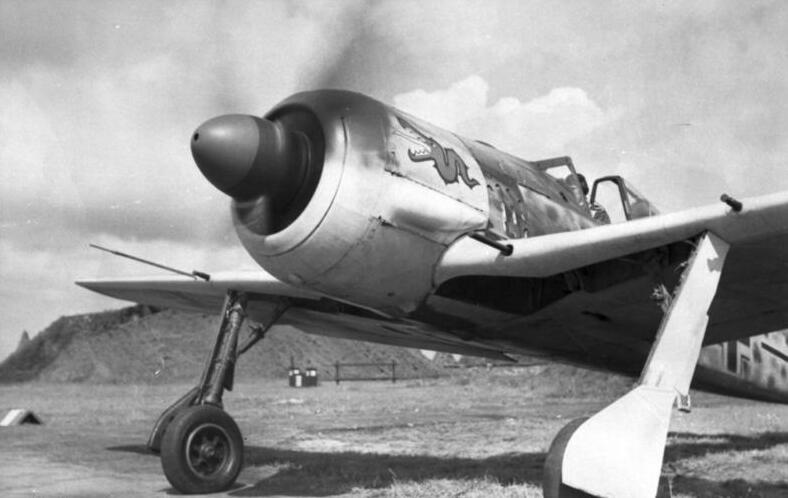
Fw 190A-3 of JG 1 in the Netherlands, summer 1942.

Fw 190 A-3
The Fw 190 A-3 was equipped with the BMW 801 D-2 engine, which increased power to 1,700 PS (1,700 hp; 1,300 kW) at takeoff. The A-3 retained the same weaponry as the A-2.

Fw 190 A-3/Umrüst-Bausatz 1 (/U1)
(W.Nr 130 270) was the first 190 to have the engine mount extended by 15 cm (5.9 in), which would be standardized on the later production A-5 model.
Fw 190 A-3/U2
The A-3/U2 (W.Nr 130386) had RZ 65 73 mm (2.9 in) rocket launcher racks under the wings with three rockets per wing. There were also a small number of U7 aircraft tested as high-altitude fighters armed with only two 20 mm MG 151 cannon, but with reduced overall weight.
Fw 190 A-3/U3
The A-3/U3 was the first of the Jabo (Jagdbomber), using an ETC-501 centre-line bomb rack able to carry up to 500 kg (1,100 lb) of bombs or, with horizontal stabilising bars, one 300 L (79 US gal) standard Luftwaffe drop tank. The U3 retained the fuselage-mounted 7.92 mm (0.312 in) MG 17s and the wing-mounted 20 mm MG 151 cannon, with the outer MG FF being removed.
Fw 190 A-3/U4
The A-3/U4 was a reconnaissance version with two RB 12.5 cameras in the rear fuselage and a EK 16 gun camera or a Robot II miniature camera in the leading edge of the port wing root. Armament was similar to the U3, however, and the ETC 501 was usually fitted with the standardized Luftwaffe 300 L-capacity (79 US gal) drop tank.

Fw 190 A-3a
(a=ausländisch – foreign) In autumn 1942, 72 new aircraft were delivered to Turkey in an effort to keep that country friendly to the Axis powers. These were designated Fw 190 A-3a, designation for export models and delivered between October 1942 and March 1943.

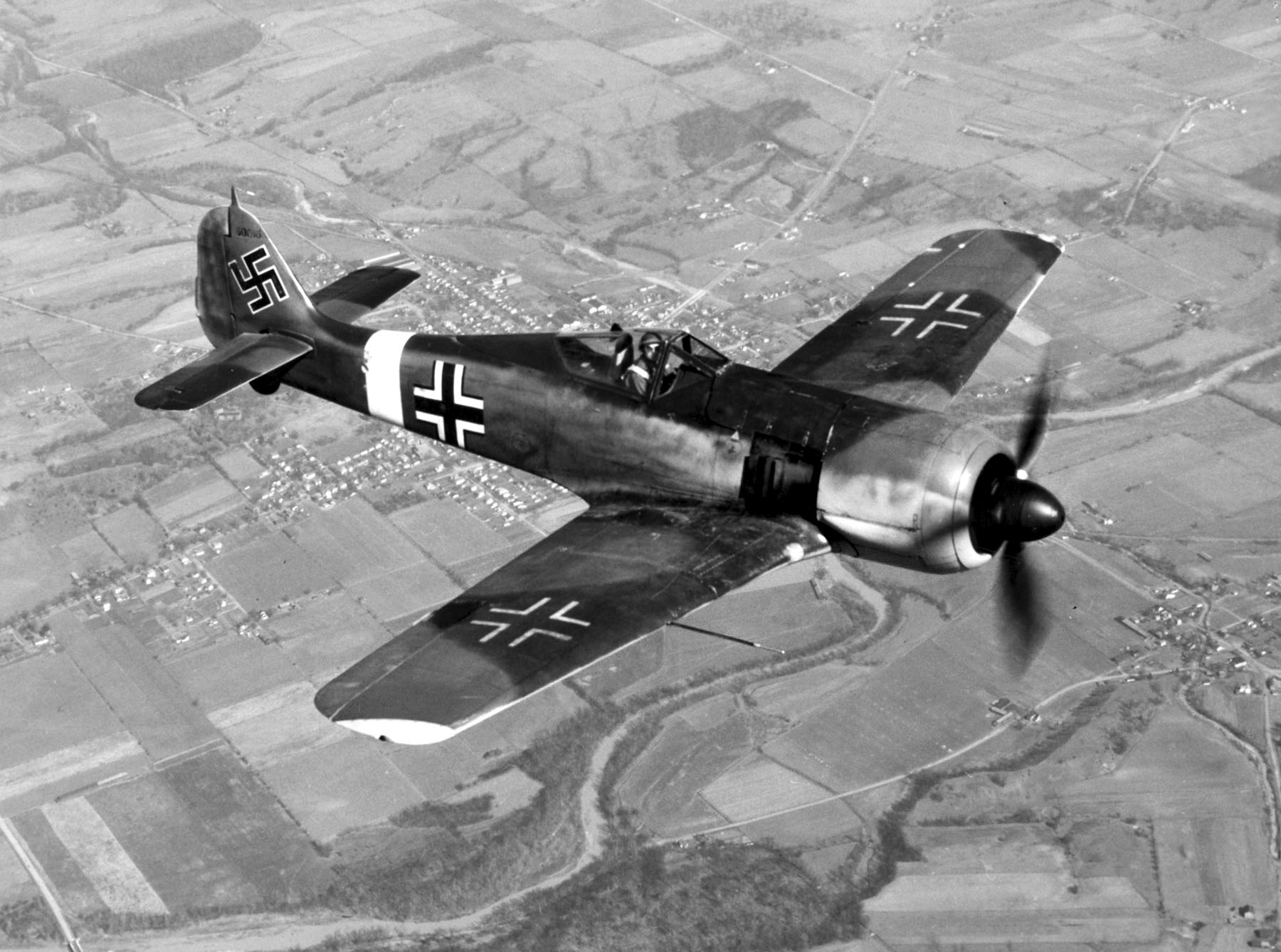
A captured Fw 190A-4. The USAAF-painted Balkenkreuz and swastika markings are of nonstandard size and proportions.

Fw 190 A-4
Introduced in July 1942, the A-4 was equipped with the same engine and basic armament as the A-3.

Fw 190 A-4/U1
The A-4/U1 was outfitted with an ETC 501 rack under the fuselage. All armament except the MG 151 cannon was removed.
Fw 190 A-4/U3
The A-4/U3 was very similar to the U1, and later served as the prototype for the Fw 190 F-1 assault fighter.
Fw 190 A-4/U4
The A-4/U4 was a reconnaissance fighter, with two Rb 12.4 cameras in the rear fuselage and an EK 16 or Robot II gun camera. The U4 was equipped with fuselage-mounted 7.92 mm (0.312 in) MG 17s and 20 mm MG 151 cannon.
Fw 190 A-4/U7
The A-4/U7 was a high-altitude fighter, easily identified by the compressor air intakes on either side of the cowling. Adolf Galland flew a U7 in the spring of 1943.
Fw 190 A-4/U8
The A-4/U8 was the Jabo-Rei (Jagdbomber Reichweite, long-range fighter-bomber), adding twin standard Luftwaffe 300 L (79 US gal) drop tanks, one under each wing, on VTr-Ju 87 racks with duralumin fairings produced by Weserflug, and a centreline bomb rack. The outer wing-mounted 20 mm MG FF/M cannon and the cowling-mounted 7.92 mm (0.312 in) MG 17 were removed to save weight. The A-4/U8 was the precursor of the Fw 190 G-1.
Fw 190 A-4/Rüstsatz 1 (/R1)
The A-4/R1, was fitted with a FuG 16ZY radio set with a Morane "whip" aerial fitted under the port wing. These aircraft, called Leitjäger or Fighter Formation Leaders, could be tracked and directed from the ground via special R/T equipment called Y-Verfahren (Y-Control). More frequent use of this equipment was made from the A-5 onwards.
Fw 190 A-4/R6
Some A-4s were fitted with a pair of under-wing Werfer-Granate 21 (BR 21) rocket mortars, and were designated Fw 190 A-4/R6.

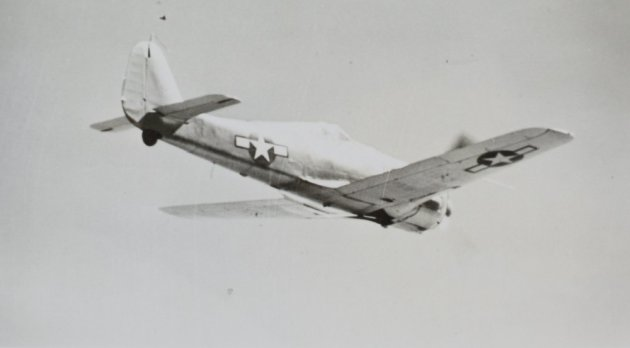
Captured Fw 190A-5 Werknummer 150 051, in U.S. Navy colors

Fw 190 A-5
The A-5 was developed after it was determined that the Fw 190 could easily carry more ordnance. The D-2 engine was moved forward another 15 cm (5.9 in) as had been tried out earlier on the service test A-3/U1 aircraft, moving the centre of gravity forward to allow more weight to be carried aft.

Fw 190 A-5/U2
The A-5/U2 was designed as a night Jabo-Rei and featured anti-reflective fittings and exhaust flame dampers. A centre-line ETC 501 rack typically held a 250 or 500 kg (550 or 1,100 lb) bomb, and wing-mounted racks mounted 300 L (79 US gal) drop tanks. A EK16 gun camera, as well as landing lights, were fitted to the wing leading edge. The U2 was armed with only two 20 mm MG 151 cannon.
Fw 190 A-5/U3
The A-5/U3 was a Jabo fighter fitted with ETC 501s for drop tanks and bombs; it too featured only two MG 151s for armament.
Fw 190 A-5/U4
The A-5/U4 was a "recon" fighter with two RB 12.5 cameras and all armament of the basic A-5 with the exception of the MG FF cannon.
Fw 190 A-5/U8
The A-5/U8 was another Jabo-Rei outfitted with SC-250 centreline-mounted bombs, under-wing 300-litre drop tanks and only two MG 151s; it later became the Fw 190 G-2.
Fw 190 A-5/U9
Test installation of the A-7 modifications.
Fw 190 A-5/U12
A special U12 was created for bomber attack, outfitted with the standard 7.92 mm (0.312 in) MG 17 and 20 mm MG 151 but replacing the outer wing 20 mm MG-FF cannon with two underwing gun pods containing two 20 mm MG 151/20 each, for a total of two machine guns and six cannon.
Fw 190 A-5/U14
Was able to carry a torpedo (Stkz TD+SI White 871).
Fw 190 A-5/R11
The A-5/R11 was a night fighter conversion fitted with FuG 217 Neptun (Neptune) radar equipment with arrays of three dipole antenna elements vertically mounted fore and aft of the cockpit and above and below the wings. Flame-dampening boxes were fitted over the exhaust exits. A total of 1,752 A-5s were built from November 1942 to June 1943.

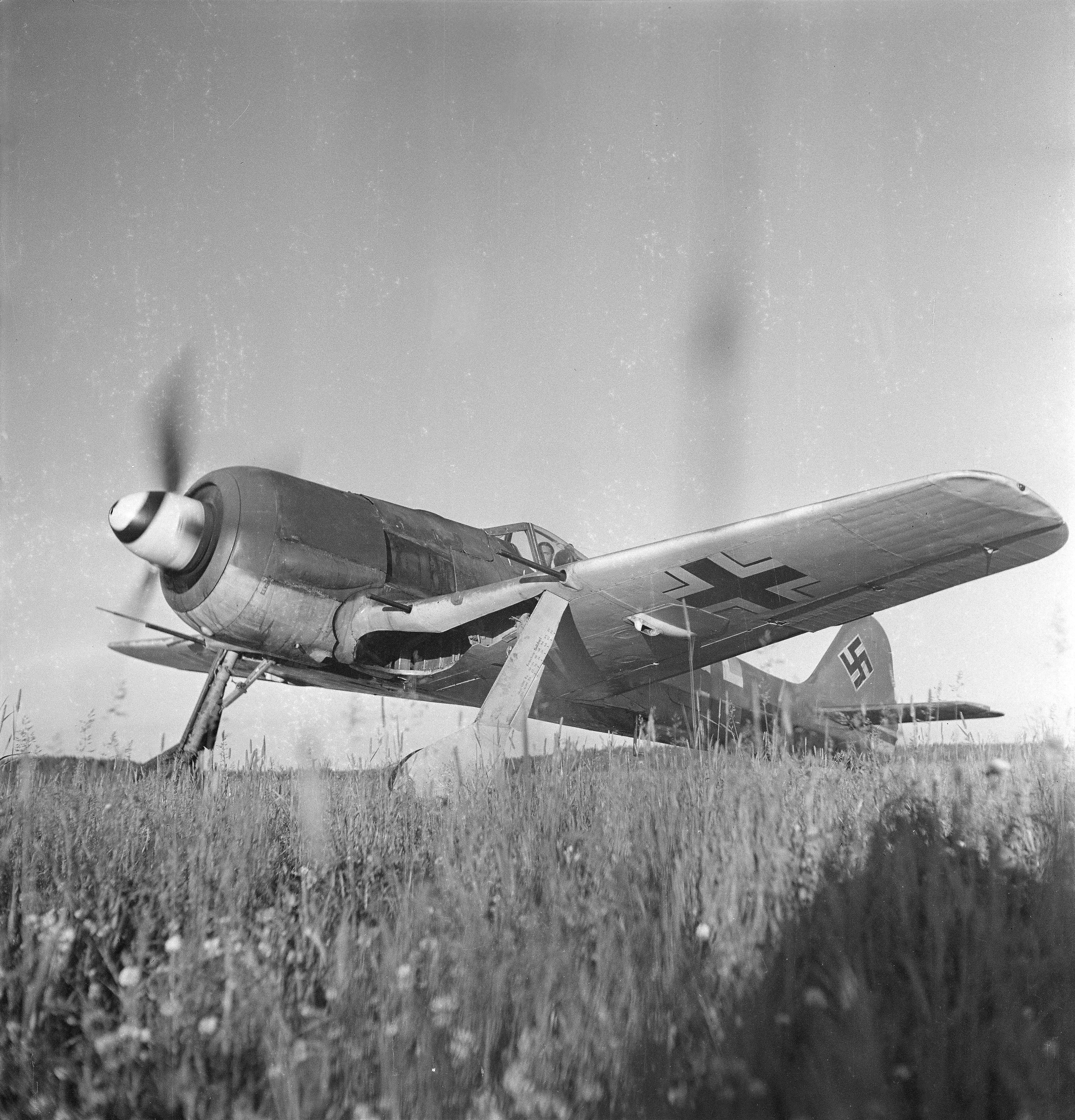
Fw 190 A-6 at Immola Airfield Finland, summer 1944.

Fw 190 A-6
The A-6 was developed to address shortcomings found in previous "A" models when attacking U.S. heavy bombers. A structurally redesigned and lighter wing was introduced and the normal armament was increased to two MG 17 fuselage machine guns and four 20 mm MG 151/20E wing root and outer wing cannon with larger ammunition boxes.
Fw 190 A-7
The A-7 entered production in November 1943, equipped with the BMW 801 D-2 engine, again producing 1,700 PS (1,700 hp; 1,300 kW) and two fuselage-mounted 13 mm (0.51 in) MG 131s, replacing the MG 17s.

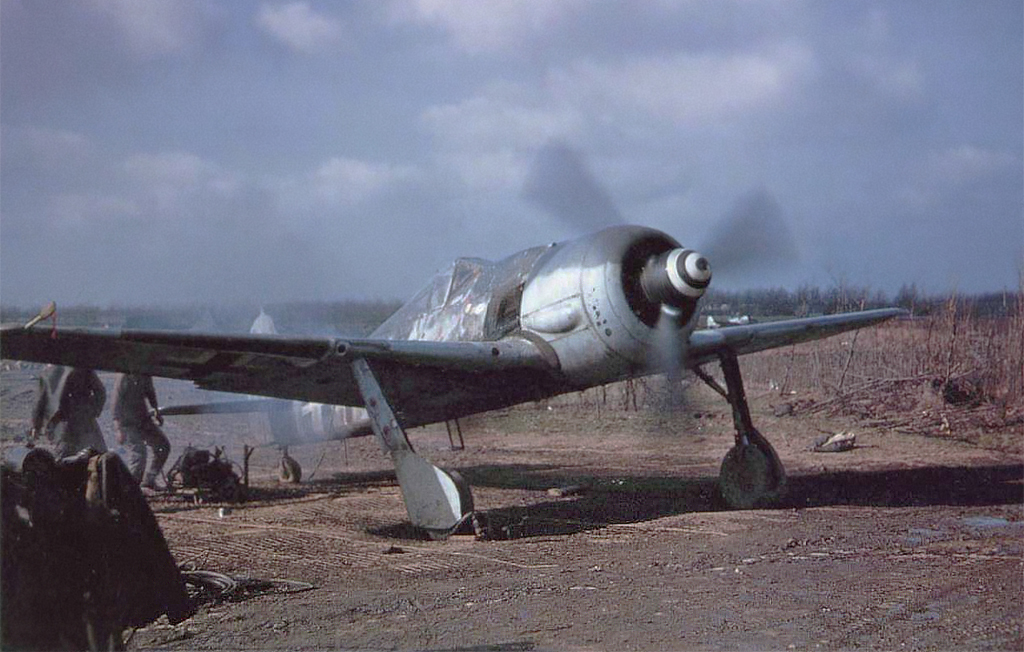
An Fw 190 A-8/R2 in American hands. "White 11" of 5./JG 4 was captured during Operation Bodenplatte after its engine had been damaged by American light flak.

Fw 190 A-8
The A-8 entered production in February 1944, powered either by the standard BMW 801 D-2 or the 801Q (also known as 801TU). The 801Q/TU, with the "T" signifying a Triebwerksanlage unitized powerplant installation, was a standard 801D with improved, thicker armour on the BMW-designed front annular cowling, which still incorporated the BMW-designed oil cooler, upgraded from 6 mm (0.24 in) on earlier models to 10 mm (0.39 in). Changes introduced in the Fw 190 A-8 also included the C3-injection Erhöhte Notleistung emergency boost system to the fighter variant of the Fw 190 A (a similar system with less power had been fitted to some earlier Jabo variants of the 190 A), raising power to 1,980 PS (1,950 hp; 1,460 kW) for 10 minutes. The 10 minute emergency power may be used up to three times per mission with a 10 minute cooldown in "combat power" between each 10 minute use of emergency power.

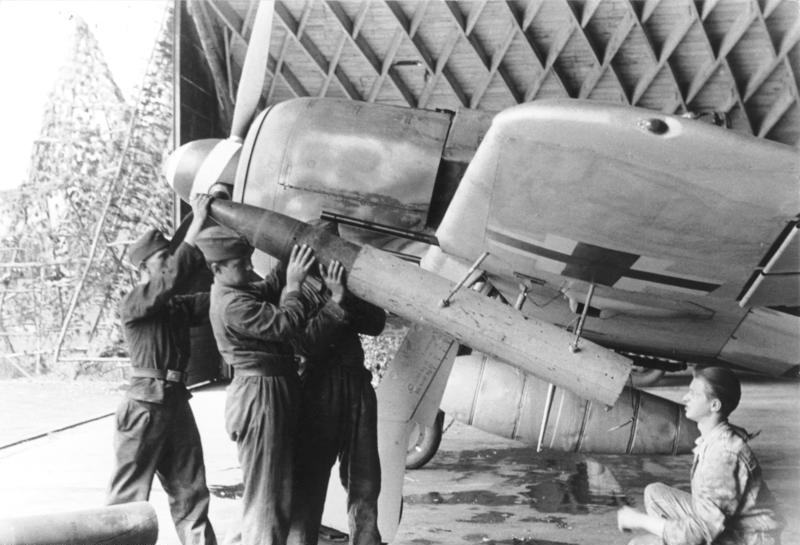
Fw 190 A-8 with the under-wing WGr 21 rocket-propelled mortar. The weapon was developed from the 21 cm Nebelwerfer 42 infantry weapon.

Fw 190 A-8/R2
The A-8/R2 replaced the outer wing 20 mm cannon with a 30 mm (1.2 in) MK 108 cannon.
Fw 190 A-8/R4
The A-8/R4 featured GM1 nitrous boost to the standard BMW 801 D/Q engine. GM1 (nitrous oxide) injection increased power for short amounts of time, up to 10 minutes at a time. A 20 minute supply was usually carried.
Fw 190 A-8/R8
The A-8/R8 was similar to the A-8/R2, but fitted with heavy armour including 30 mm (1.2 in) canopy and windscreen armour and 5 mm (0.20 in) cockpit armour.

Fw 190 A-9
First built in September 1944, the Fw 190 A-9 was fitted with the new BMW 801S rated at 2,000 PS (1,973 hp; 1,471 kW); the more powerful 2,400 PS (2,400 hp; 1,800 kW) 801F-1 was still under development, and not yet available.
Fw 190 A-10
Late in the war, the A-10 was fitted with larger wings for better maneuverability at higher altitudes, which could have allowed additional 30 mm (1.2 in) calibre, long-barreled MK 103 cannon to be fitted.

A total of 13,291 Fw 190 A-model aircraft were produced.

A-6, A-7, and A-8 were modified for Sturmböcke bomber-destroyer operations.

=== High-altitude developments ===
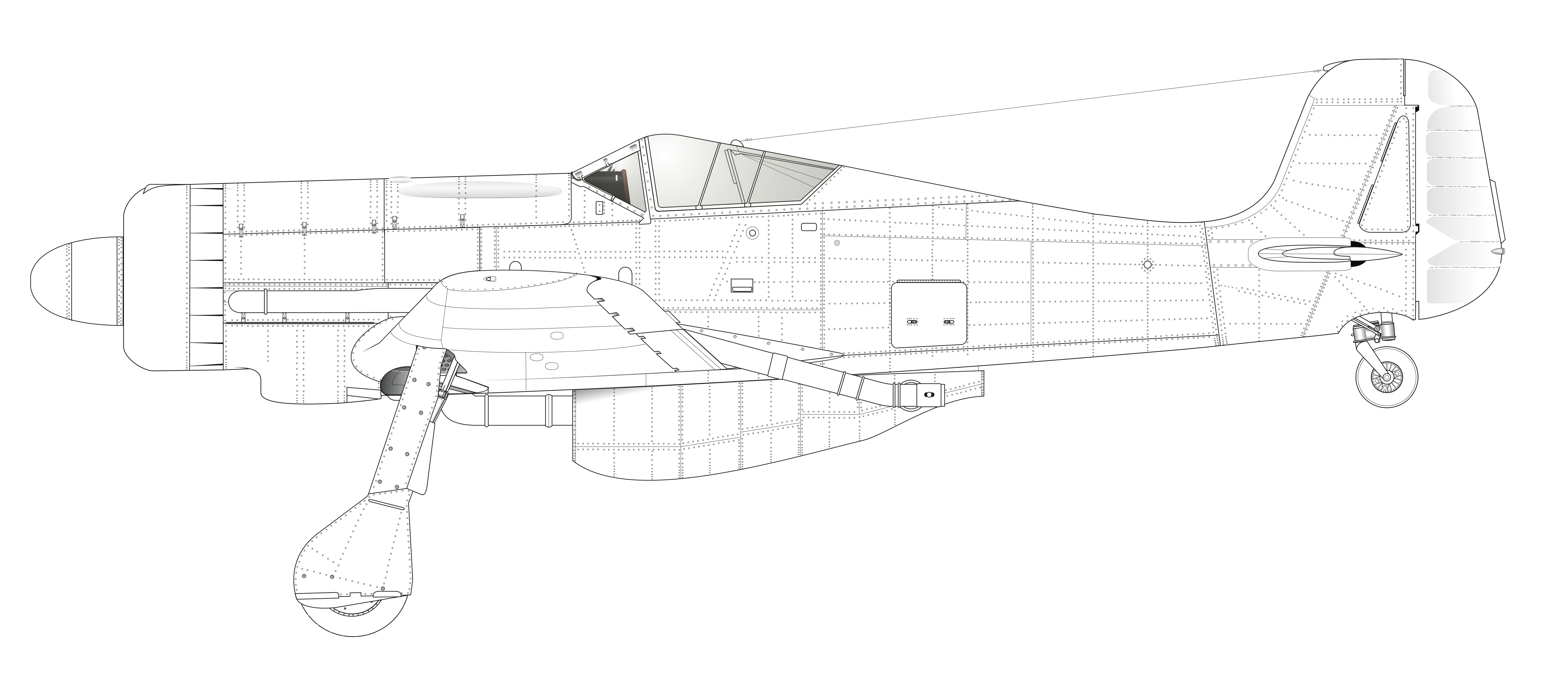
The Fw 190C V18 prototype, with large ventral "pouch" fairing for the turbocharger installation and broader-chord vertical fin/rudder.

Tank started looking at ways to address the altitude performance problem early in the program. In 1941, he proposed a number of versions featuring new powerplants, and he suggested using turbochargers in place of superchargers. Three such installations were outlined

Fw 190 V12
(an A-0) would be outfitted with many of the elements which eventually led to the B series.
Fw 190 V13
(W.Nr. 0036) first C-series prototype
Fw 190 V15
(W.Nr. 0036) second C-series prototype
Fw 190 V16
(W.Nr. 0036) third C-series prototype
Fw 190 V18
(W.Nr. 0036) fourth C-series prototype
Fw 190 B-0
With a turbocharged BMW 801
Fw 190 B-1
This aircraft was similar to the B-0, but had slightly different armament. In its initial layout, the B-1 was to be fitted with four 7.92 mm (0.312 in) MG 17s and two 20 mm MG-FFs. One was fitted with two MG 17s, two 20 mm MG 151s and two 20 mm MG-FFs. After the completion of W.Nr. 811, no further Fw 190 B models were ordered.

An early production Fw 190 D-9 at the Cottbus plant. Note the early canopy and redesigned, simplified centreline rack carrying a 300 L drop tank.

==== V-12 Engine ====
Fw 190 C
With a turbocharged Daimler-Benz DB 603, the tail of the aircraft had to be lengthened in order to maintain the desired centre of gravity. Four additional prototypes based on the V18/U1 followed: V29, V30, V32 and V33.
Fw 190 D
The Fw 190 D (nicknamed Dora; or Long-Nose Dora ("Langnasen-Dora") was intended as the high-altitude performance version of the A-series.
Fw 190 D-0
The first D-0 prototype was completed in October 1942 with a supercharged Junkers Jumo 213 including a pressurized cockpit and other features making them more suitable for high-altitude work.

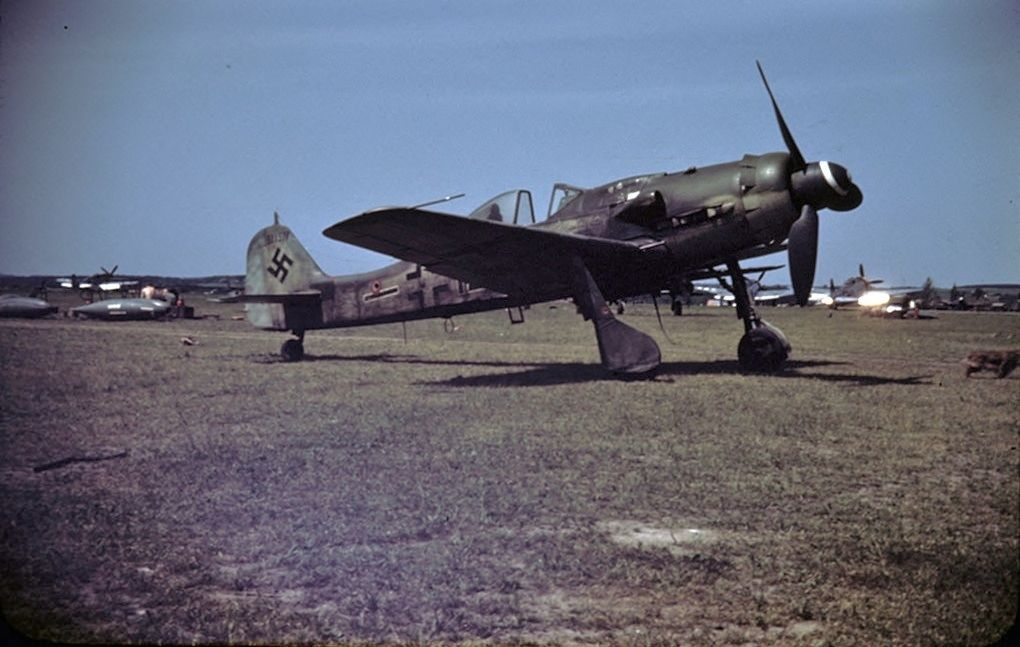
This captured Fw 190 D-9 appears to be a late production aircraft built by Fieseler at Kassel. It has a late style canopy; the horizontal black stripe with white outline shows that this was a II. Gruppe aircraft.

Fw 190 D-1
Initial production
Fw 190 D-2
Initial production
Fw 190 D-9
The D-9 series was rarely used against heavy-bomber raids, as the circumstances of the war in late 1944 meant that fighter-versus-fighter combat and ground attack missions took priority. This model was the basis for the follow-on Focke-Wulf Ta 152 aircraft.
Fw 190 D-11
Fitted with the up-rated Jumo 213F series engine similar to the Jumo 213E used in the Ta-152 H series but minus the intercooler. Two 30 mm (1.2 in) MK 108 cannons were installed in the outer wings to complement the 20 mm MG 151s in the inboard positions.

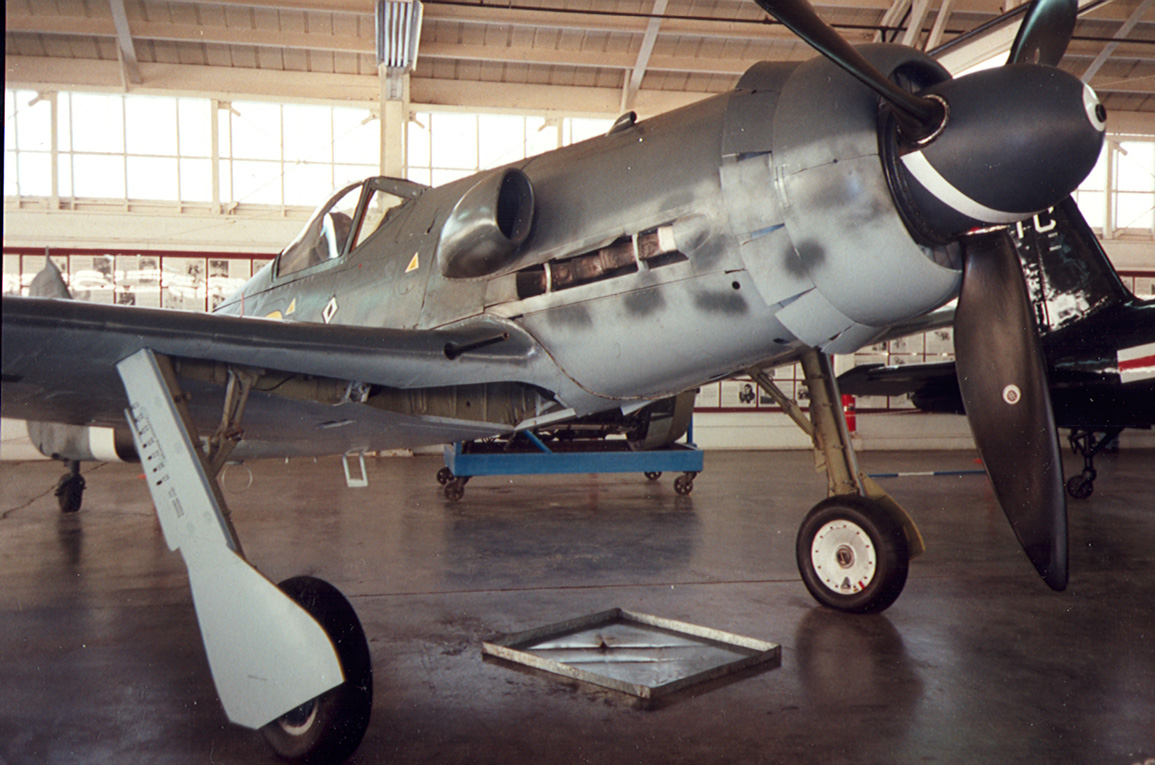
Fw 190 D-13/R11, Champlin Fighter Museum, Phoenix, Arizona (c.1995)

Fw 190 D-12
Similar to the D-11, but featured the 30 mm (1.2 in) MK 108 cannon in a Motorkanone installation firing through the propeller hub.
Fw 190 D-13
The D-13 would be fitted with a 20 mm MG 151/20 motor cannon.

=== Ground attack versions (BMW 801) ===
Fw 190 F
The Fw 190F configuration was originally tested in a Fw 190 A-0/U4, starting in May 1942, fitted with centre-line and wing-mounted bomb racks.
Fw 190 F-1
Renamed A-4/U3s of which 18 were built
Fw 190 F-2
Renamed A-5/U3s, of which 270 were built according to Focke-Wulf production logs and Ministry of Aviation acceptance reports.
Fw 190 F-3
Developed under the designation Fw 190 A-5/U17, which was outfitted with a centreline mounted ETC 501 bomb rack. The Fw 190 F-3/R1 had two additional ETC 50 bomb racks under each wing. The F-3 could carry a 66-Imp gal (300 liter) drop tank. A total of 432 Fw 190 F-3s were built.
Fw 190 F-4 to F-7
designations used for projects.

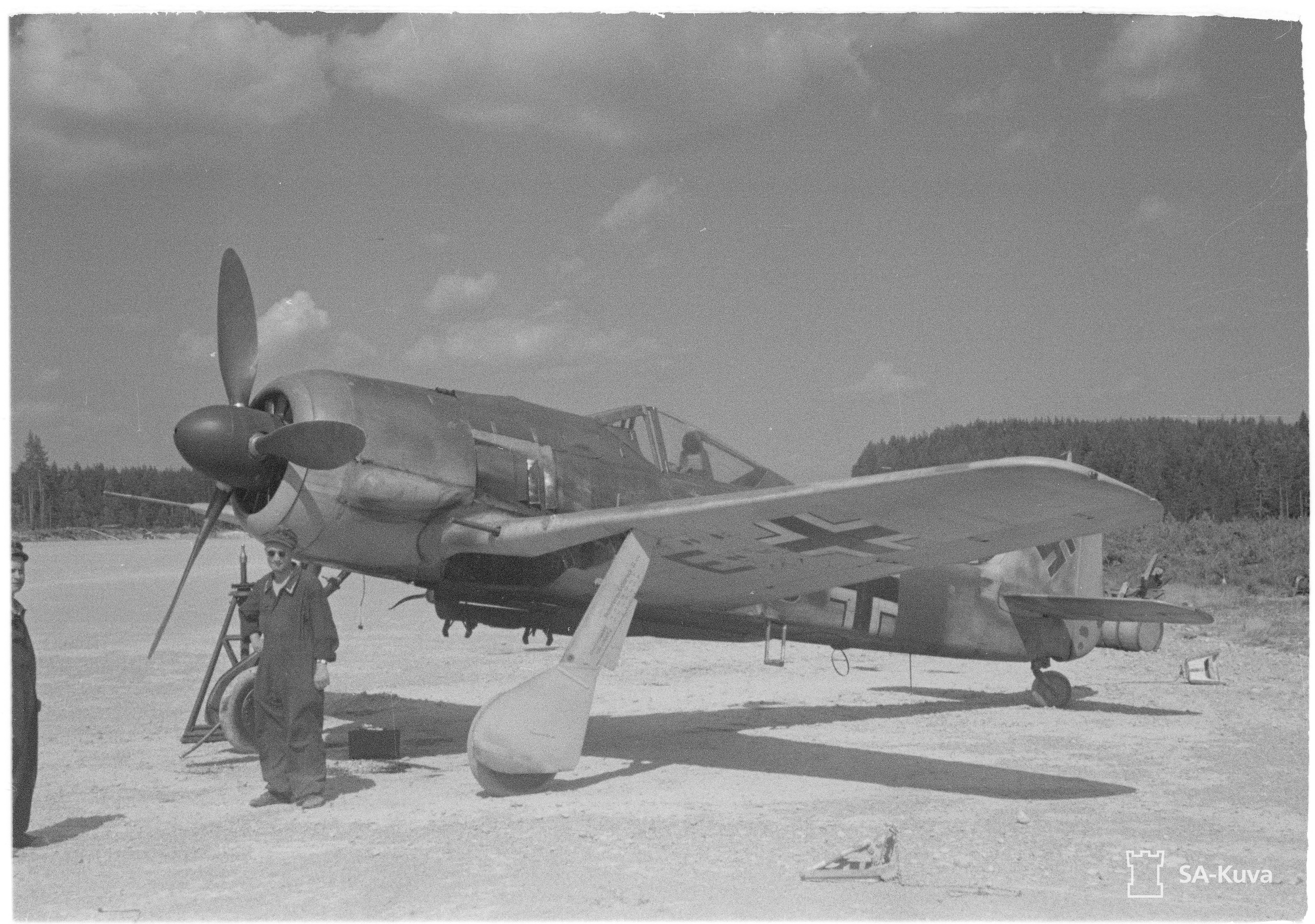
Fw 190 F-8 in 1944.

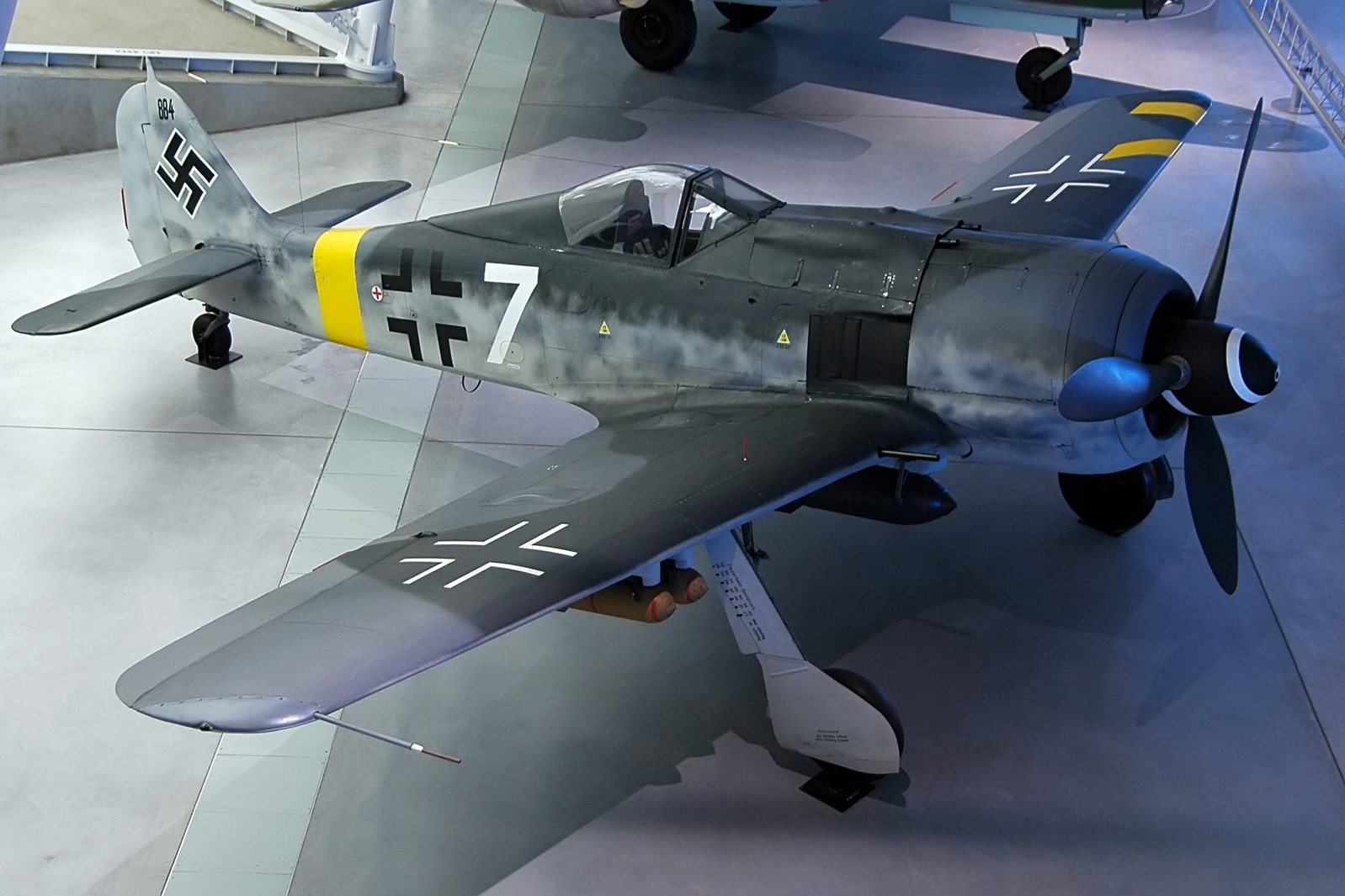
The National Air & Space Museum's restored Fw 190 F-8 in late war, "low-visibility" Balkenkreuz markings

Fw 190 F-8
Based on the A-8 Fighter, having a slightly modified injector on the compressor which allowed for increased performance at lower altitudes for several minutes. Armament of the Fw 190 F-8 was two 20 mm MG 151/20 cannon in the wing roots and two 13 mm (0.51 in) MG 131 machine guns above the engine. It was outfitted with an ETC 501 Bomb rack as centerline mount and four ETC 50 bomb racks as underwing mounts.

Fw 190 F-8/U1
long range Jabo, fitted with underwing V.Mtt-Schloß shackles to hold two of the Luftwaffe's standardized 300 L (79 US gal) drop tanks. ETC 503 bomb racks were also fitted, allowing the Fw 190 F-8/U1 to carry one SC 250 bomb under each wing and one SC 250 bomb on the centreline.
Fw 190 F-8/U2
prototype torpedo bomber, fitted with an ETC 503 bomb rack under each wing and a centre-line mounted ETC 504. The U2 was also equipped with the TSA 2 A weapons sighting system that improved the U2's ability to attack seaborne targets with a 700 kg (1,500 lb) BT 700.
Fw 190 F-8/U3
heavy torpedo bomber was outfitted with an ETC 502, which allowed it to carry one BT-1400 heavy torpedo (1,400 kg (3,100 lb)). Owing to the size of the torpedo, the U3's tail gear needed to be lengthened. The U3 also was fitted with the 2,000 PS BMW 801S engine, and the tail from the Ta 152.
Fw 190 F-8/U4
created as a night bomber, was equipped with flame dampers on the exhaust and various electrical systems such as the FuG 101 radio altimeter, the PKS 12 automatic pilot, and the TSA 2 A sighting system. The U4 was fitted with only two MG 151/20 cannon as fixed armament.
Fw 190 F-8/R3
project with two underwing mounted 30mm MK 103 cannon.

Fw 190 F-9
based on the Fw 190 A-9, equipped with a new bulged canopy as fitted to late-build F-8s and A-8s, and four ETC 50 or ETC 70 bomb racks under the wings. According to Ministry of Aviation acceptance reports, 147 F-9s were built in January 1945, and perhaps several hundred more from February to May 1945. (Data for these months is missing and probably lost.)

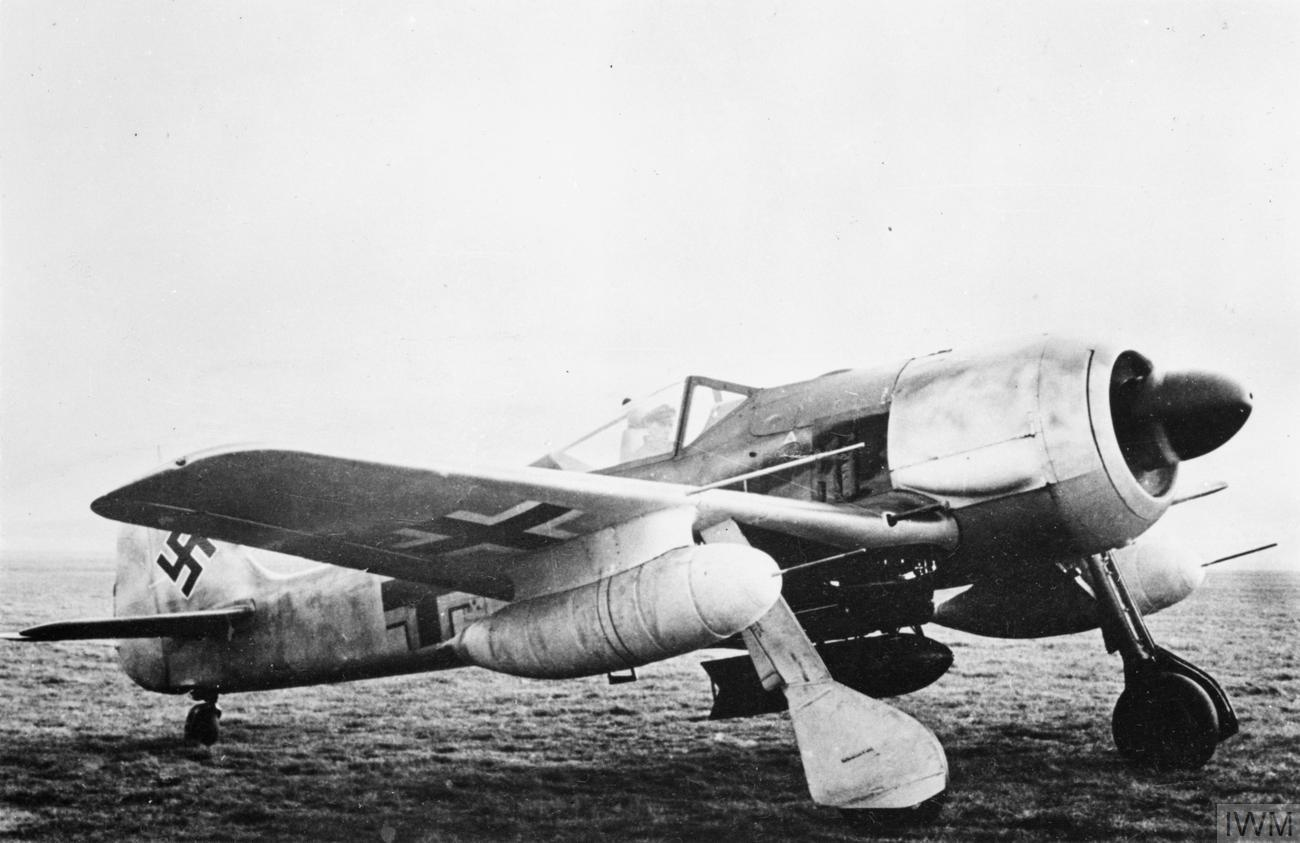
Fw 190 G-1 showing the ETC 250 bomb rack, carrying a 250 kg (550 lb) bomb, and the underwing 300 litre drop tanks on VTr-Ju 87 mounts.

Fw 190 G
The Fw 190 G was built as a long-range attack aircraft (Jagdbomber mit vergrösserter Reichweite – abbreviated JaBo Rei). Following the success of the Fw 190 F as a Schlachtflugzeug (close support, or "strike aircraft"), both the Luftwaffe and Focke-Wulf began investigating ways of extending the range of the Fw 190 F. Approximately 1,300 Fw 190 Gs of all variants were new built.
Fw 190 G-1
The G-1 was renamed from A-4/U8 Jabo Reis. Initial testing found that if all but two wing root mounted 20 mm MG 151 cannons (with reduced ammunition load) were removed, the Fw 190 G-1 (as it was now called) could carry a 250 kg (550 lb) or 500 kg (1,100 lb) bomb on the centreline and up to a 250 kg (550 lb) bomb under each wing.
Fw 190 G-2
The G-2 was renamed from Fw 190 A-5/U8 aircraft, similar to the G-1; the underwing drop tank racks were replaced with the much simpler V.Mtt-Schloß fittings, to allow for a number of underwing configurations.
Fw 190 G-3
The G-3 was based on A-6 with all but the two wing root mounted MG 151 cannons removed. The new V.Fw. Trg bombracks, however, allowed the G-3 to simultaneously carry fuel tanks and bomb loads

Fw 190 G-3/R1
The G-3/R1 replaced the V.Fw. Trg racks with a pair of Waffen-Behälter WB 151/20 conformal cannon pods; each mounting a pair of Mauser MG 151/20 autocannon, giving the G-3/R1 – with its existing pair of wing-root mounted, synchronized MG 151/20 autocannon, a total of six such ordnance pieces.
Fw 190 G-3/R5
The G-3/R5 was similar to the R1, but the V.Fw. Trg racks were removed, and two ETC 50 racks per wing were added.

Fw 190 G-8
The G-8 was based on the Fw 190 A-8, using the same "bubble" canopy as the F-8 and fitted with underwing ETC 503 racks that could carry either bombs or drop tanks.

Fw 190 G-8/R4
The G-8/R4 kit was a planned refit for the GM 1 engine boost system, but never made it into production.
Fw 190 G-8/R5
The G-8/R5 kit replaced the ETC 503 racks with two ETC 50 or 71 racks.

=== Trainer versions ===
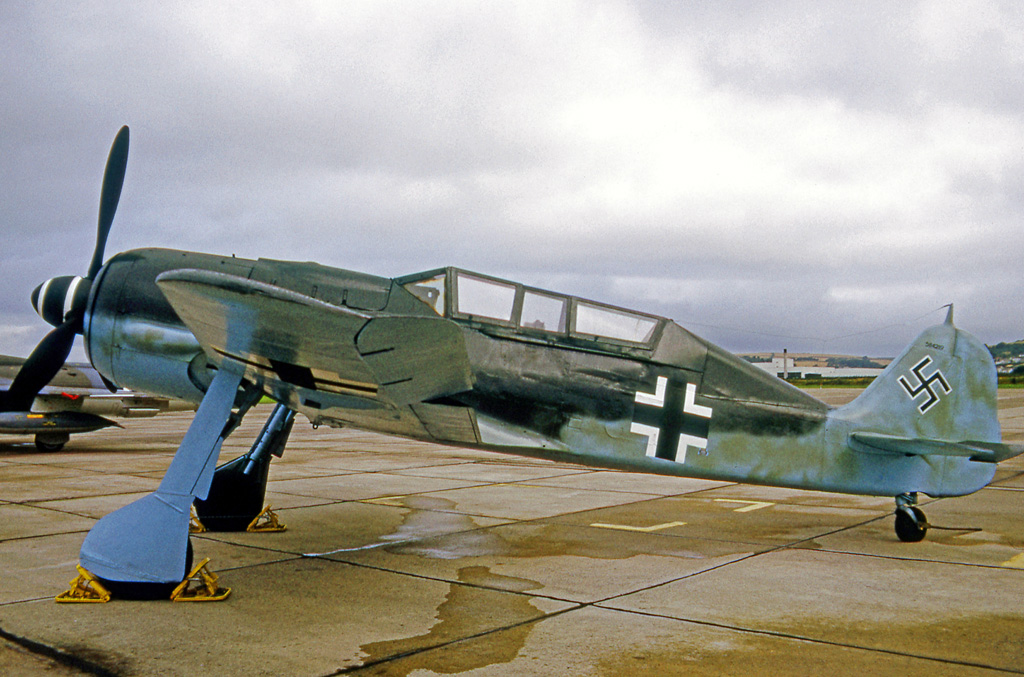
An Fw 190 A-5/U1, the only surviving two-seat aircraft, now part of the RAF Museum's collection (1971 photograph)

Fw 190 A-5/U1
Several old Fw 190 A-5s were converted by replacing the MW 50 tank with a second cockpit. The canopy was modified, replaced with a new three-section unit that opened to the side. The rear portion of the fuselage was closed off with sheet metal.
Fw 190 A-8/U1
A similar conversion to the A-5/U1.
Fw 190 S-5
A-5/U1 trainers re-designated.
Fw 190 S-8

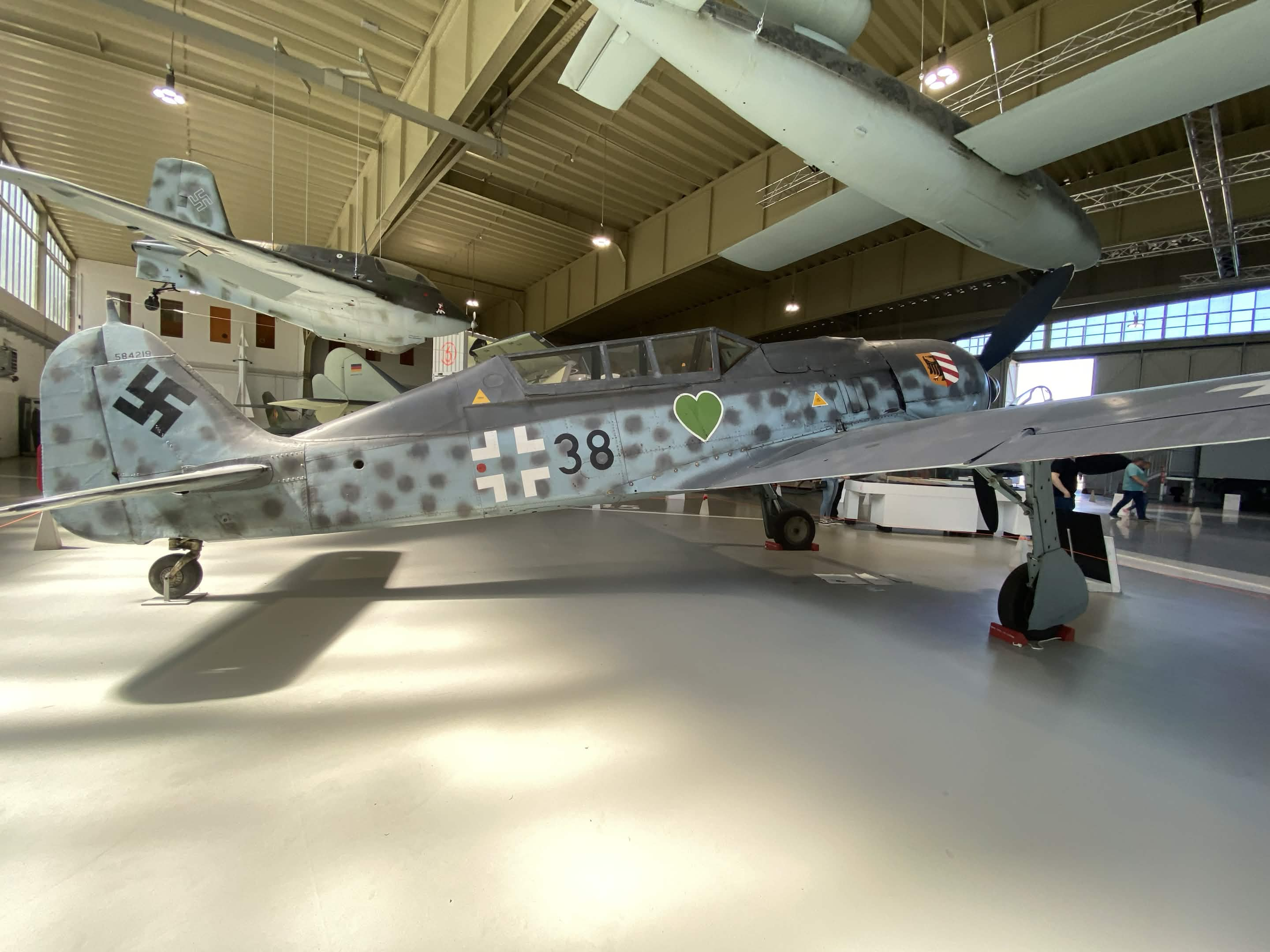
The last FW-190 F-8/U1 exiting at Militärhistorisches Museum Flugplatz Berlin-Gatow

A-8/U1 trainers re-designated. An estimated 58 Fw 190 S-5 and S-8 models were converted or built.

== Combat history ==
The Fw 190 participated on every major combat front where the Luftwaffe operated after 1941, and did so with success in a variety of roles. The Fw 190 first tasted combat on the Western Front in August 1941, where it proved superior to the Mk V Spitfire. The Spitfire's main advantage over the Fw 190, and the Bf 109 as well, was its superior turn radius. Beyond that, the Fw 190 outperformed the Spitfire Mk. V in most areas, such as roll rate, speed, acceleration, and dive performance. The addition of the Fw 190 to the Jagdwaffe allowed the Germans to fight off RAF attacks and achieve local air superiority over German skies until the summer of 1942, when the improved Spitfire Mk. IX was introduced. In June 1942, Oberleutnant Armin Faber of JG 2 landed his Fw 190 A-3 at a British airfield, allowing the RAF to test the Mk. IX against the 190 and learn tactics to counter it.

== Production ==
A 0.40 km^{2} (99-acre) Focke-Wulf plant east of Marienburg was bombed by the Eighth Air Force on 9 October 1944. In addition, one of the most important sub-contractors for the radial-engined Fw 190s was AGO Flugzeugwerke, which from 1941 through to the end of the war produced enough Fw 190s to earn it major attention from the USAAF, with the AGO plant in Oschersleben being attacked at least five times during the war from 1943 onwards.

Production
Variant	Number	Production dates
Fw 190 A-1	102	June–October 1941
Fw 190 A-2/A-3	909	October 1941 – August 1943
Fw 190 A-4	975	June 1942 – August 1943
Fw 190 A-5	1,752	November 1942 – August 1943
Fw 190 A-6	1,052	May 1943 – March 1944
Fw 190 A-7	701	November 1943 – March 1944
Fw 190 A-8	6,655	February 1944 – February 1945
Fw 190 A-9	930	September 1944 – February 1945
Total (including prototypes and pre-production aircraft)	13,291	—
Fw 190 F-1/F-2 (A-4)	18 & 271	May 1942 – May 1943
Fw 190 F-3 (A-5)	432	May 1943 – April 1944
Fw 190 F-8 (A-8)	6,143	March 1944 – February 1945
Fw 190 F-9 (A-9)	415	September 1944 – February 1945
Total	7,279	—
Fw 190 G-1 (A-4)	183	August–November 1942
Fw 190 G-2 (A-5)	235	1942 July – 1943 May
Fw 190 G-3 (A-6)	214	June–December 1943
Fw 190 G-8 (A-8)	689	August 1943 – February 1944
Total	~1,300	—
Fw 190 D-9	1,805	August 1944 – April 1945 (Note: First entered service in late-September 1944.)
Fw 190 D-11	20	February–March 1945
Fw 190 D-13	1	April 1945
Total	1,826	—
Fw 190 S-5 converted from A-5 or built	~20	Late 1944
Fw 190 S-8 converted from A-8 or built	~38	Late 1944
Total	58	—
Ta 152 V/H-0	44	December 1944 – January 1945
Ta 152 H-1	25	January–April 1945
Total	69	—
Total (all variants)	23,823	—

== Surviving aircraft and modern replicas ==
Some 28 original Fw 190s are in museums or in the hands of private collectors around the world.

In 1997, a German company, Flug Werk GmbH, began manufacturing new Fw 190 models as reproductions. By 2012, 20 had been produced, most flyable, a few as static display models, with airworthy examples usually powered by Chinese-manufactured Shvetsov ASh-82 twin-row, 14-cylinder radial powerplants, which have a displacement of 41.2 litres, close to the BMW 801's 41.8 litres, with the same engine cylinder arrangement and number of cylinders.

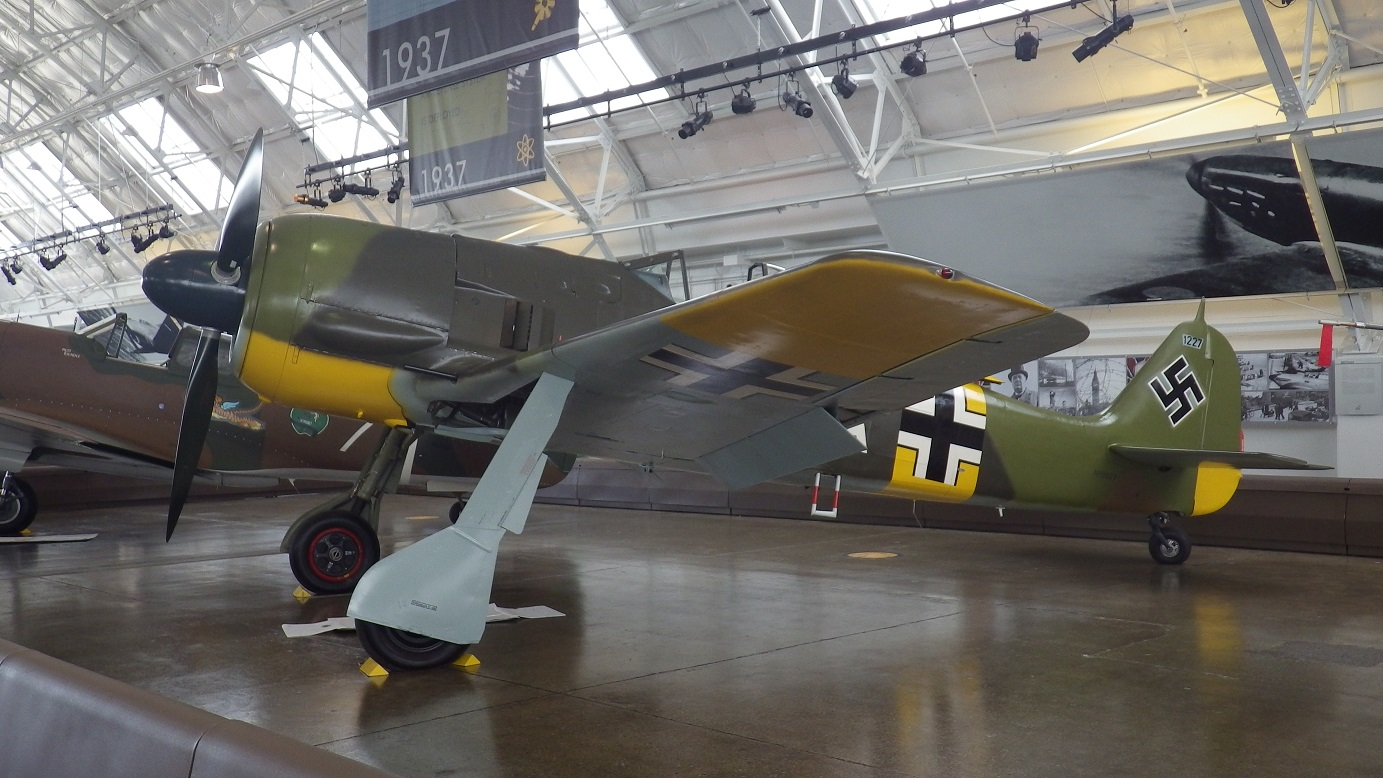
The Flying Heritage & Combat Armor Museum's airworthy Fw 190A-5, WkNr. 151 227, on indoor display between flights.

The nearly intact wreck of an Fw 190 A-5/U3 (Werknummer 151 227) that had crashed in a marsh in a forest near Leningrad, Soviet Union, 1943 was located in 1989. After restoration in the US, the Fw 190 flew again (with the original BMW 801 powerplant) on 1 December 2010. Following the successful test flight, the aircraft was transported to the Flying Heritage & Combat Armor Museum in Everett, Washington, where it was reassembled in April 2011 and returned to airworthy condition.

At least five surviving Fw 190A radial-engined aircraft are known to have been assigned to the Luftwaffe's JG 5 wing in Herdla, Norway. More German fighter aircraft on display in museums in the 21st century have originated from this unit than from any other Axis Powers' military aviation unit of World War II.

The Turkish Air Force retired all of its Fw 190A-3 fleet in early May 1948, mostly because of a lack of spare parts. It is rumored that American-Turkish bilateral agreements required retiring and scrapping of all German-origin aircraft, although that requirement did not exist for any other country. 35 of the 36 FW190-A3s that took off from the 5th Air Squadron in Bursa on the morning of 4 May, 1948 landed in Kayseri, with one aircraft executing an emergency landing en route at Eskişehir. According to the Hürriyet Daily News, all of the retired Fw 190s were saved from scrapping by wrapping them with protective cloths and burying them in the soil near the Aviation Supply and Maintenance Center at Kayseri. All attempts to locate and recover the aircraft have been unsuccessful, which suggests the story is probably a hoax or myth.

== Operators ==
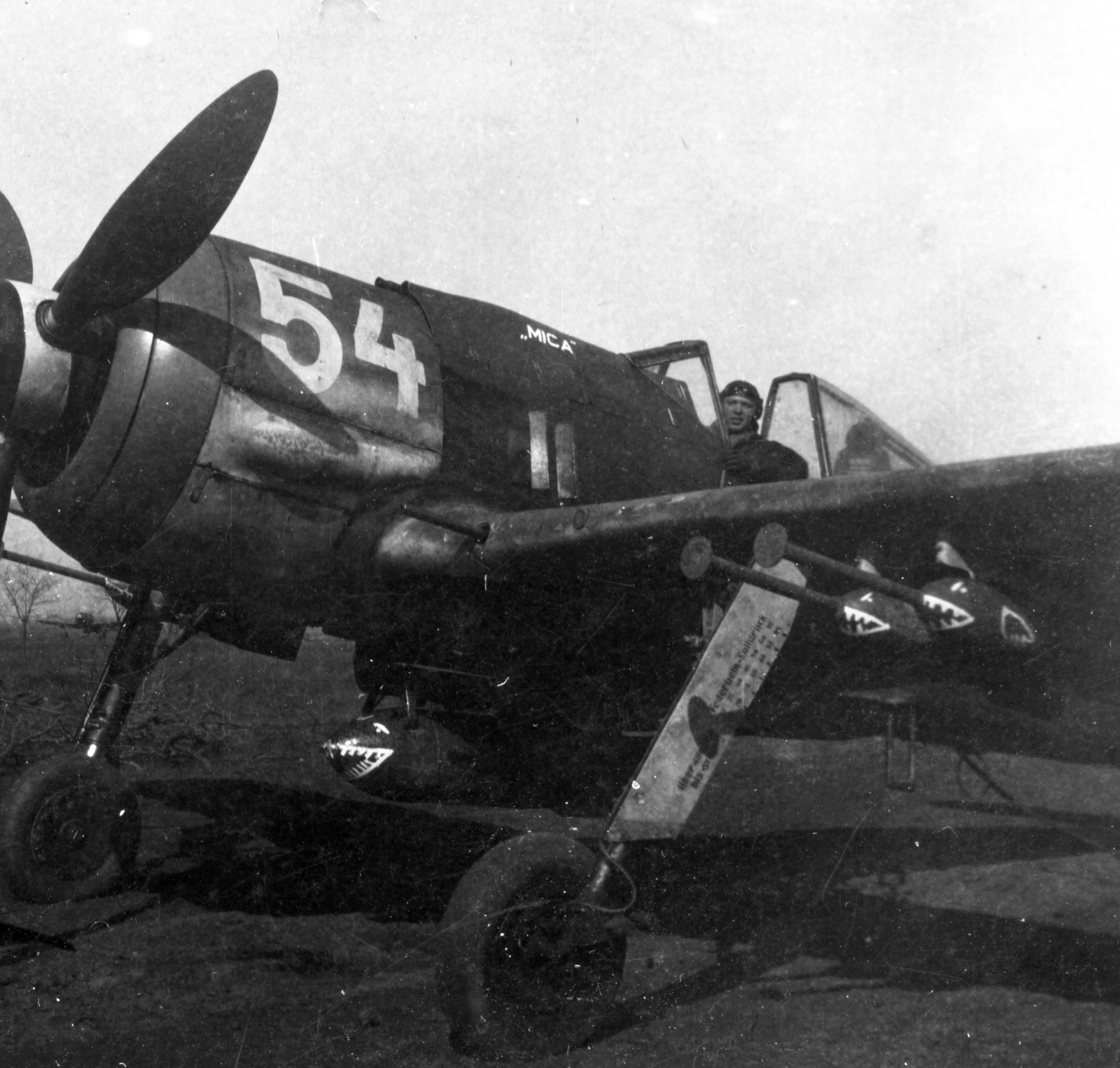
A Royal Hungarian Air Force Fw 190F-8 on the Eastern Front in 1944.

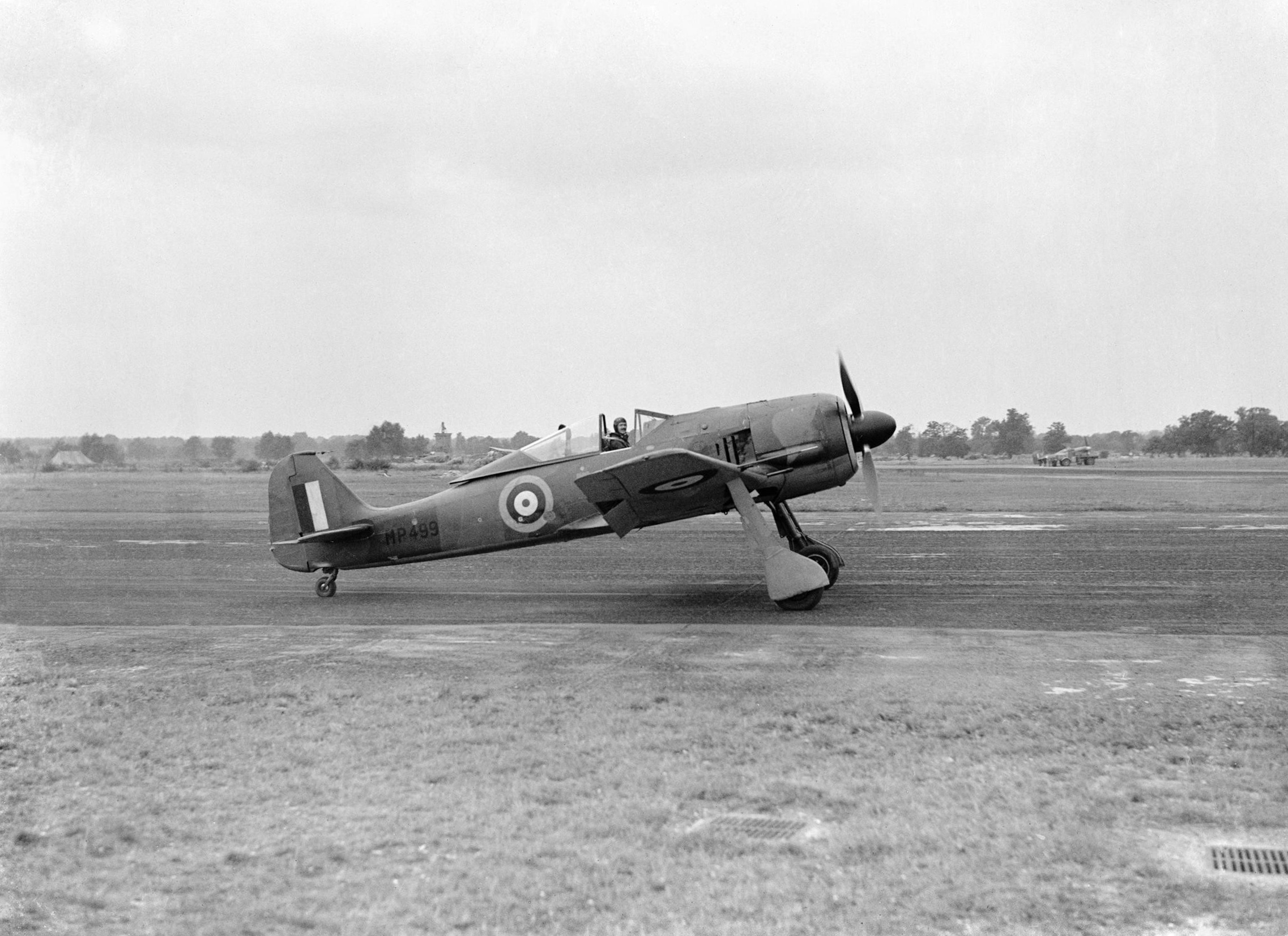
A captured Focke Wulf Fw 190A-3 at the Royal Aircraft Establishment.

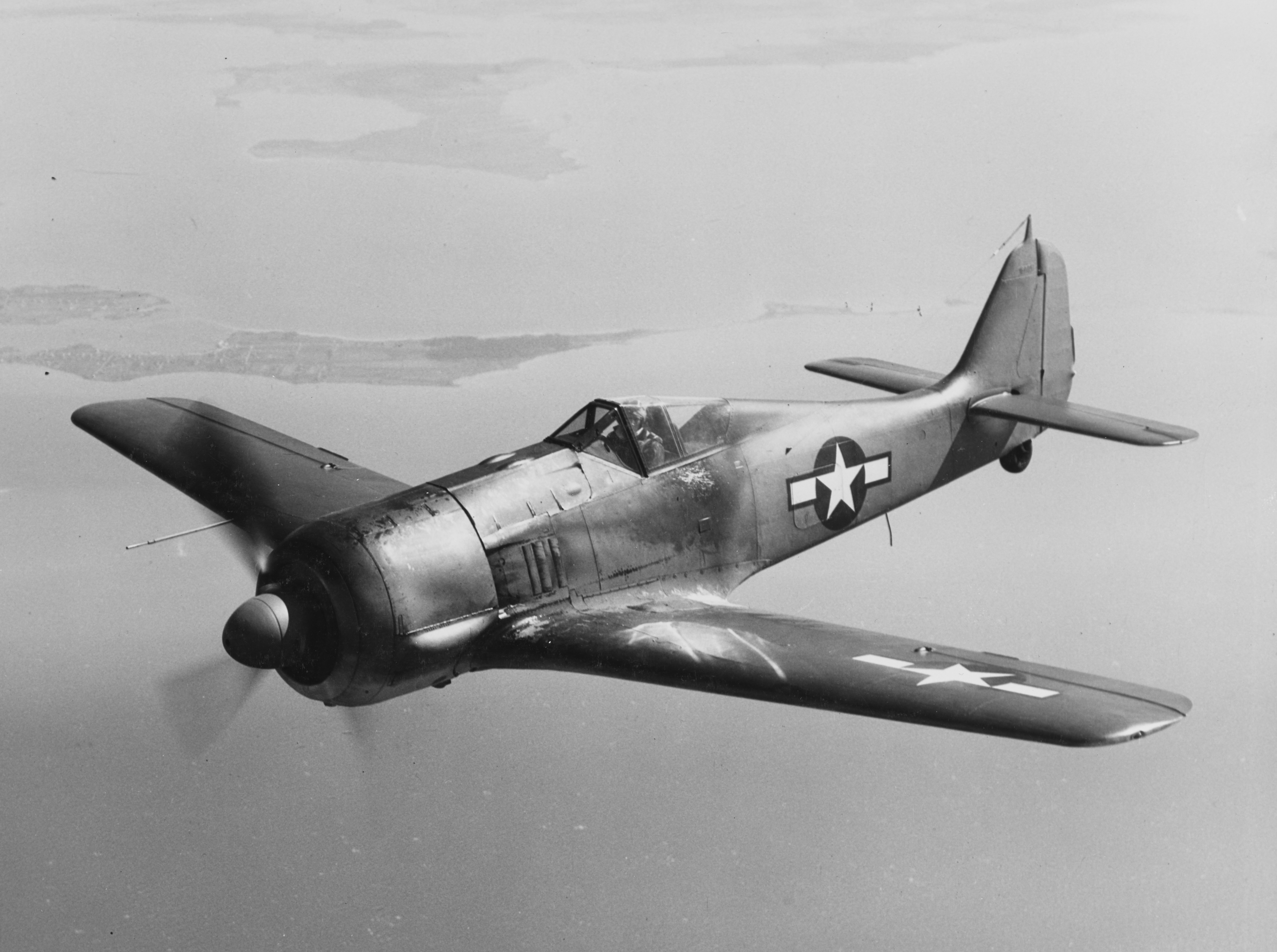
Captured Fw 190A-5, WkNr. 150 051 in U.S. Navy tri-color scheme

- Czechoslovakia
  - Czechoslovak Air Force (postwar)
- France
  - French Air Force – 70 aircraft of the Fw 190 A-5/A-6 model were reassembled at a forward repair shop the Germans had hastily abandoned using the SNCAC NC.900 designation. The aircraft were used operationally for a short period and withdrawn due to problems with the BMW 801 engine.
  - French Navy (postwar)
- Nazi Germany
  - Luftwaffe
- Hungary
  - Royal Hungarian Air Force received a total of 72 Fw 190F-8s starting in November 1944. They were operated by the 102. vadászbombázó század, later 102. csatarepülő osztály (102nd Fighter-Bomber Squadron, later Wing) engaging in close-support missions on the Eastern Front in 1944–45. The planes were nicknamed "Fóka" (Seal), a wordplay on the German name "Focke".
- Empire of Japan
  - The Imperial Japanese Army Air Service received one Fw 190A-5 for evaluation purposes.
- Spanish State
  - Spanish Air Force – The Spanish Air Force operated Fw 190A-2,3,4 among Fw 190 A-8 and Gs with volunteers of Escuadrilla Azul (15ª Spanische Staffel, JG 51 "Mölders" VIII. Fliegerkorps, belonged in LuftFlotte 4) on the Eastern Front (from Orel during September 1942 to Bobruisk, during July 1943) and Defense of the Reich over Germany.
- Romania
  - Royal Romanian Air Force – Following the 23 August 1944 coup by King Michael, which resulted in Romania leaving the Axis powers, Romania captured 22 Luftwaffe Fw 190 As and Fs. They were not used operationally. Nine serviceable Fw 190s were later confiscated by the Soviet Union.
- Soviet Union
  - Soviet Air Force – A number of captured aircraft were trialled by the NII VVS (Air Force Scientific Test Institute), including Fw 190 A-4, A-5 and A-8 models, as well as the long-nose D-9.
  - Soviet Naval Aviation – The Baltic Fleet Air Arm operated a number of Fw 190 D-9 models that were captured in East Prussia, including couple of Focke-Wulf Fw 190 D-9s captured intact by the 2 Guards IAP of 322 IAD at a Focke-Wulf facility near Marienburg. Various photos exist of these machines in Marienburg in the summer of 1945, but little is known of their use.
- Turkey
  - Turkish Air Force – Beginning in mid-1942, received 72 examples of the Fw 190 A-3a (export model of A-3, the "a" stood for ausländisch – foreign) from Germany to modernize their air force. These aircraft were basically Fw 190 A-3s, with BMW 801 D-2 engines and FuG VIIa radios and an armament fit of four MG 17s, with the option of installing two MG-FF/M cannon in the outer wing positions. The export order was completed between October 1942 and March 1943. The Fw 190 remained in Turkish service until late 1947 when they were retired due to a lack of spare parts.
- United Kingdom
  - Royal Air Force – No. 1426 (Enemy Aircraft) Flight RAF evaluated at least one captured Fw 190A-3.
- United States
  - United States Army Air Forces and United States Navy – A small number of captured Fw 190As fell into American hands in Europe and North Africa, with one captured A-5 model, WkNr. 150 051, being flown for a time at the Patuxent Naval Air Test Center by the U.S. Navy during the war years.
- Yugoslavia
  - SFR Yugoslav Air Force – Postwar, one aircraft.

== Specifications (Fw 190 A-8) ==
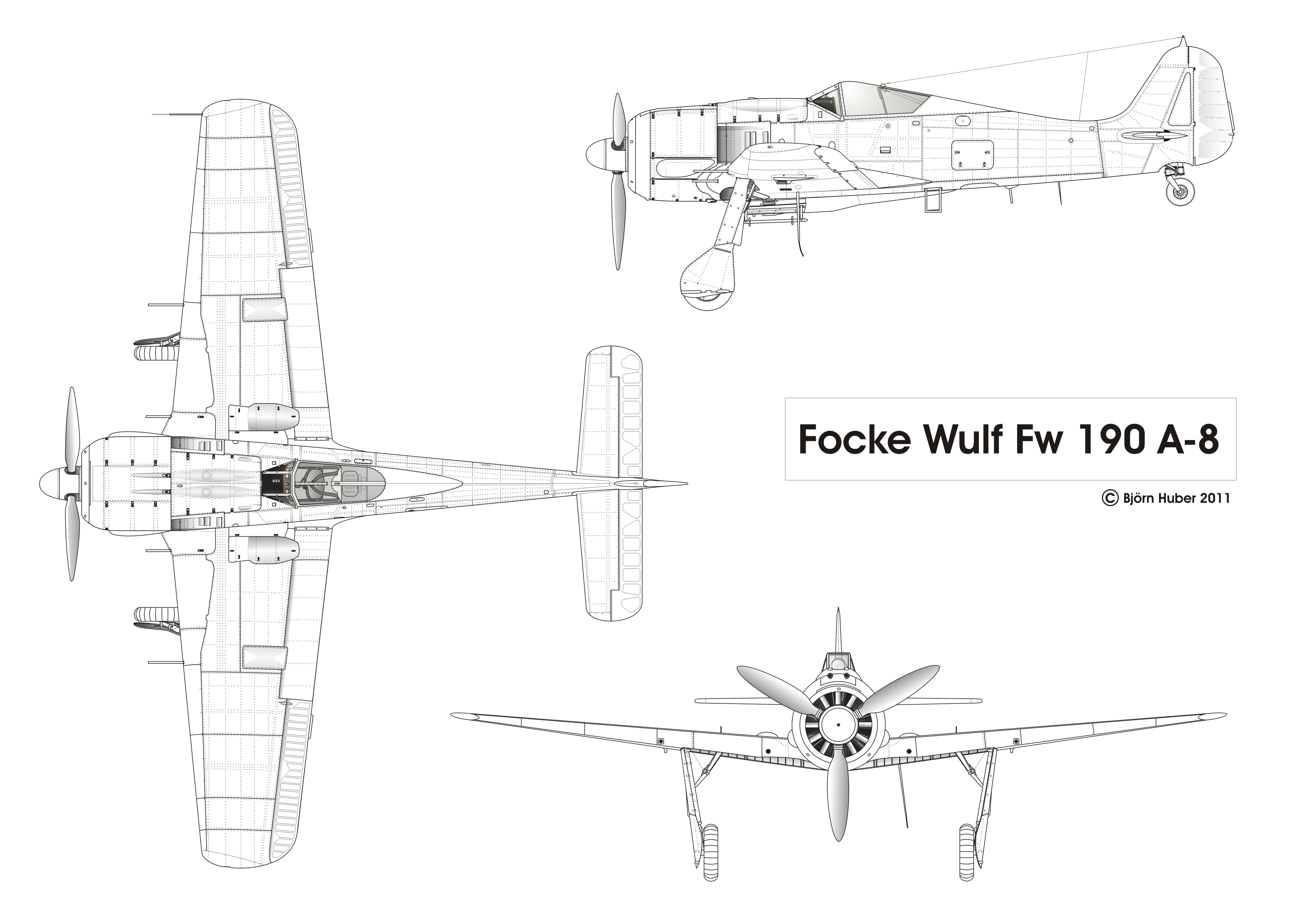
Fw 190A-8 three view drawing

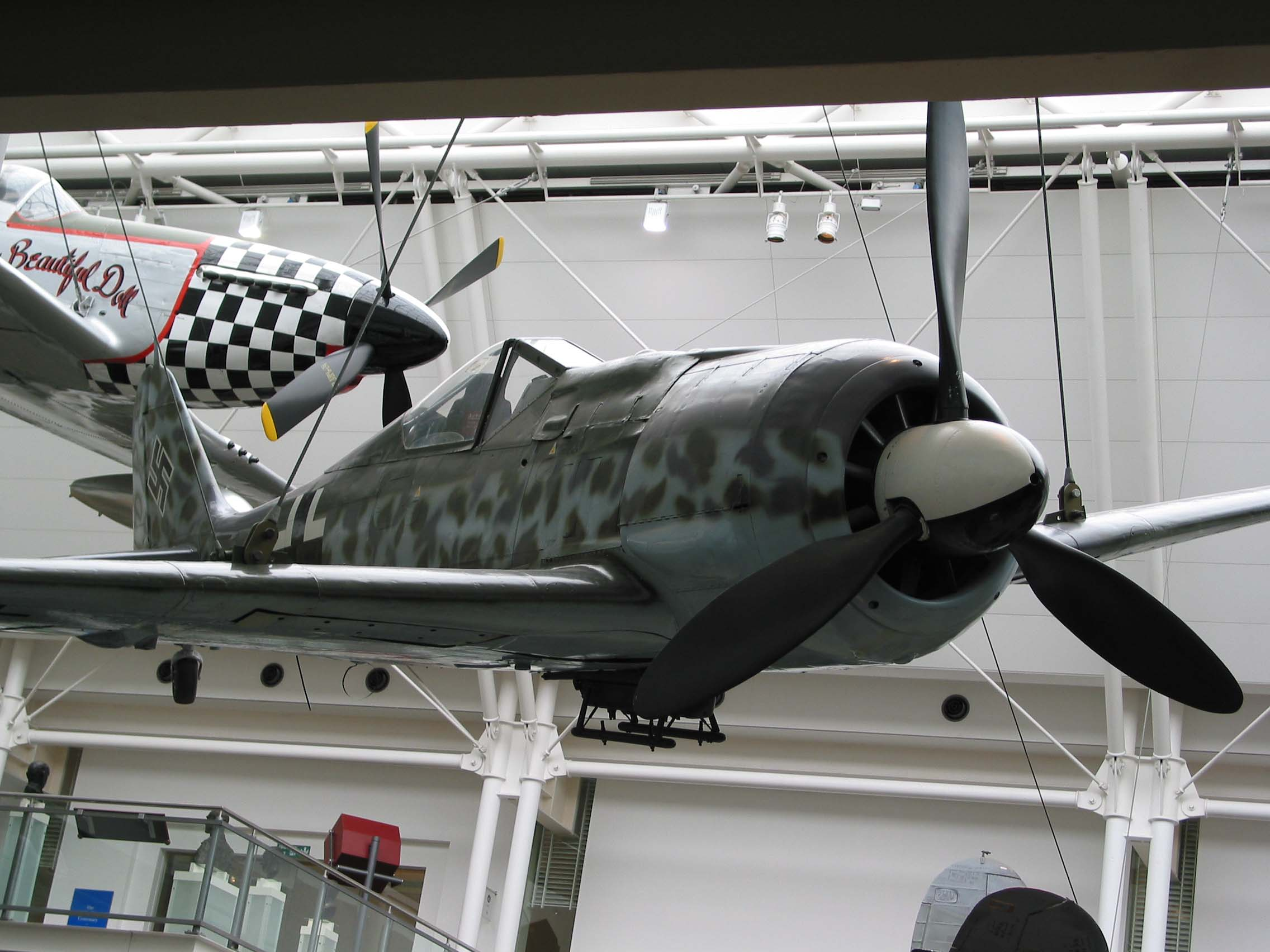
An Fw 190 A-8 (W-Nr:733682) at the Imperial War Museum showing faired-over gun ports and a belly-mounted ETC-501 bomb rack. This Fw 190 was used as the upper component for a Mistel flying bomb.

Data from Fw 190 A8,

General characteristics

- Crew: One
- Length: 8.95 m (29 ft 4 in)
- Wingspan: 10.506 m (34 ft 6 in)
- Height: 3.15 m (10 ft 4 in)
- Wing area: 18.3 m^{2} (197 sq ft)
- Airfoil: root: NACA 23015.3; tip: NACA 23009
- Empty weight: 3,200 kg (7,055 lb)
- Gross weight: 4,417 kg (9,738 lb)
- Max takeoff weight: 4,900 kg (10,803 lb)
- Fuel capacity: 639 L (141 imp gal; 169 US gal)
- Powerplant: 1 × BMW 801D-2 14-cylinder air-cooled radial piston engine 1,700 PS (1,677 hp; 1,250 kW) (Note: up to 1,980 PS (1,953 hp; 1,456 kW) at 1.65 ata for up to 10 minutes of emergency power)
- Propellers: 3-bladed constant-speed propeller

Performance

- Maximum speed: 652 km/h (405 mph, 352 kn) at 5,920 m (19,420 ft)
- Range: 900–1,000 km (560–620 mi, 490–540 nmi)
- Combat range: 400–500 km (250–310 mi, 220–270 nmi)
- Ferry range: 900–1,000 km (560–620 mi, 490–540 nmi) ~1800–2000 km with droptank.
- Service ceiling: 10,350 m (33,960 ft)
- Rate of climb: 15 m/s (3,000 ft/min)
- Wing loading: 241 kg/m^{2} (49 lb/sq ft)
- Power/mass: 0.28–0.33 kW/kg (0.17–0.20 hp/lb) No–full emergency power

Armament

- Guns:
- 2 × 13 mm (0.51 in) synchronized MG 131 machine guns
- 2 × 20 mm (0.79 in) MG 151/20 E cannons, synchronized in the wing roots
- 2 × 20 mm (0.79 in) MG 151/20 E cannons in mid-wing mounts
- Bombs: 1 bomb under fuselage or four bombs under wings.

== See also ==
Related development

- Focke-Wulf Ta 152

Aircraft of comparable role, configuration, and era

- Bloch MB.155
- Curtiss XP-42
- Fiat G.55 Centauro
- Grumman F6F Hellcat
- Hawker Typhoon
- Kawanishi N1K
- Kawasaki Ki-60
- Lavochkin La-5
- Macchi C.205 Veltro
- Mikoyan-Gurevich MiG-1
- Mitsubishi J2M
- Nakajima Ki-44
- Nakajima Ki-84
- North American P-51 Mustang
- Republic P-47 Thunderbolt
- Supermarine Spitfire
- Vought F4U Corsair
- Yakovlev Yak-3U
- Yakovlev Yak-9

Related lists

- List of fighter aircraft
- List of aircraft of World War II
- List of most produced aircraft
