= Anton Benning =

German fighter ace and Knight's Cross recipient (1918–2013)

Dr. Anton Benning
- Born: 15 May 1918; Hakenberg (near Lichtenau), Westphalia, German Empire
- Died: 29 September 2013 (aged 95); Recklinghausen, Germany
- Military career
- Allegiance: Nazi Germany
- Branch: Luftwaffe
- Service years: 1938–1945
- Rank: Leutnant
- Nicknames: Toni, Fliegender Zahnarzt ("flying dentist")
- Units: JG 106; JG 301
- Conflicts: World War II: Battle of Stalingrad; Defense of the Reich
- Awards: Knight's Cross of the Iron Cross

Anton Hermann Benning (15 May 1918 – 29 September 2013) was a German Luftwaffe ace and recipient of the Knight's Cross of the Iron Cross during World War II.

== Career ==
Benning joined the Luftwaffe in 1938 and was initially posted as a flying instructor. As a transport pilot flying the Junkers Ju 52, he took part in supplying the Stalingrad pocket in early 1943, before retraining as a single engined fighter pilot with Jagdgeschwader 106 (JG 106). In June 1943 Oberfeldwebel Benning was transferred to 2./Jagdgeschwader 301 (JG 301) to operate as a "Wilde Sau" night fighter. He was transferred to 2./Jagdgeschwader 302 (JG 302) as a Leutnant, before becoming Staffelkapitän of 10./JG 301 in late 1944.

He received the Ritterkreuz on 13 April 1945.

Benning was credited with 28 victories (inc. 18 four engined bombers, of which 3 were RAF Lancasters), all on the Western Front.

He studied dentistry in Hamburg, Germany, and started a dental office in Marl, Germany. He was well known as the „flying dentist“ in his area. Both of his sons became pilots as well.

After his death in 2013 a place at the Marl-Loemühle airfield was named after him where he was a founding member. The "Toni Benning Square".

== Death ==
He died 29 September 2013, aged 95 in Recklinghausen.

== Awards ==
- Flugzeugführerabzeichen
- Iron Cross (1939)
  - 2nd Class (1 September 1940)
  - 1st Class (31 January 1942)
- German Cross in Gold on 1 January 1945 as Oberfeldwebel in the 2./Jagdgeschwader 302.
- Knight's Cross of the Iron Cross on 13 April 1945 as Leutnant and Staffelkapitän of the 1./Jagdgeschwader 301
