= Roderich Cescotti =

German general and fighter pilot during World War II

- Born: May 4, 1919; Herrenalb German Reich
- Died: March 19, 2015 (aged 95); Fürstenfeldbruck, Germany
- Military career
- Allegiance: Nazi Germany; West Germany
- Branch: Luftwaffe; German Air Force
- Service years: 1938–1945; 1955–1980
- Rank: Hauptmann (Wehrmacht); Major General (Bundeswehr)

Roderich Cescotti (4 May 1919, Herrenalb – 19 March 2015, Fürstenfeldbruck) was a German Major general of the Luftwaffe and book author.

== Life ==
When his parents' homeland in South Tyrol became Italian, the Cescotti family moved to Germany, where Roderich Cescotti was born in 1919 in Herrenalb as the son of an engineer.

=== World War II ===
In the World War II he took part as an officer and pilot on various fronts from 1940 to 1945. From September 6, 1940, he was a first lieutenant in the Kampfgeschwader 26. Until January 7, 1943, he held various positions within the squadron, most recently that of squadron captain. He then transferred to the transport pilots before joining the staff of Airforce Command Luftflotte 5 in Oslo on 24 May 1943. After another staff assignment in the same year with Fliegerführer West, he transferred to the staff of the ‘’7th Group of the Kampfgeschwader 100 as a technical officer in 1944. After further staff assignments, he took over the command of the 2nd Group of the Jagdgeschwader 301 Wilde Sau ("Wild sow") as a Hauptmann from April to May 1945. He was awarded the German Cross in Gold.

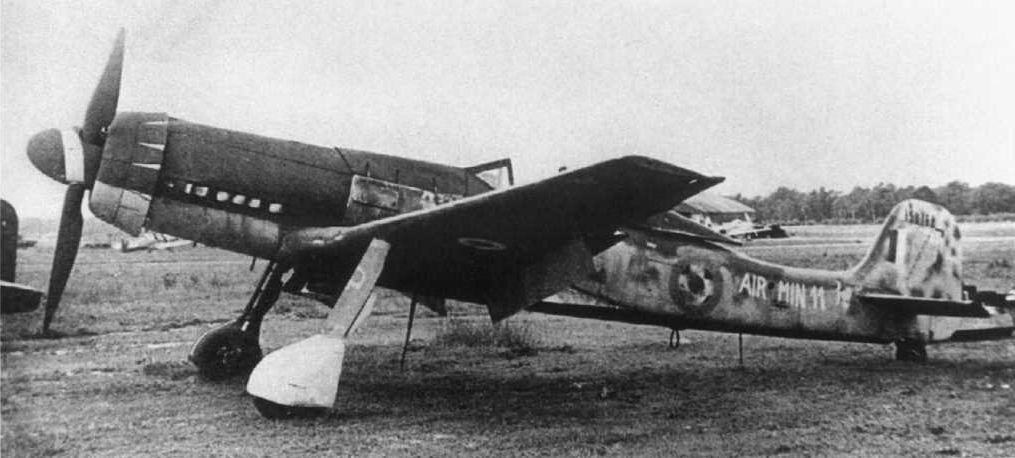
Focke-Wulf Ta 152, like flown at the Jagdgeschwader 301 (aircraft captured by the British)

=== Post-war period ===
After the end of the war, Cescotti was taken prisoner by the British, where he was trained as a translator. From June 3, 1952, he worked in the ‘’Amt Blank’’, the forerunner of the Federal Ministry of Defence (Germany), and from June 1, 1955, he was again a member of the German Air Force as a Hauptmann. This marked the beginning of a new career for him as a military pilot on various aircraft types, such as the North American T-6 trainer, the Lockheed T-33 jet trainer, the Republic F-84F ‘’Thunderstreak’’ fighter-bomber and the RF-84F Thunderflash reconnaissance aircraft.

=== Bundeswehr ===
On May 4, 1956, Cescotti completed the first solo flight by a military pilot of the Federal Republic of Germany after the war. His first assignment after pilot training took him to Ottawa, London, Ontario and Portage la Prairie as the person responsible for German pilot training in Canada from 1957 to 1958. After that, he was briefly responsible for airforce weapons school and unit leader training at the command of the schools. From January 16, 1960 to February 5, 1965, Cescotti was, initially as a Major, ’’Geschwaderkommodore’’ of the ‘’Aufklärungsgeschwader 52’’ (“Reconnaissance Squadron 52”). After completing his attaché training from April to September 1969, Cescotti was defense and air force attaché and head of the military attaché headquarters in London from September 1969 to March 1973. After many air force leadership positions at home and abroad within the western military alliance NATO, etc. and as a military representative at NATO in Washington, Cescotti ended his military career in 1980 as a Major general. In his last assignment, he was commander of the NATO COMAIRBALTAP from 1977 to 1980.

The traditional community of the Reconnaissance Wing 52 (“Traditionsgemeinschaft Aufklärungsgeschwader 52’) appointed him an honorary member in 2011.

Roderich Cescotti died on March 19, 2015, in Fürstenfeldbruck.

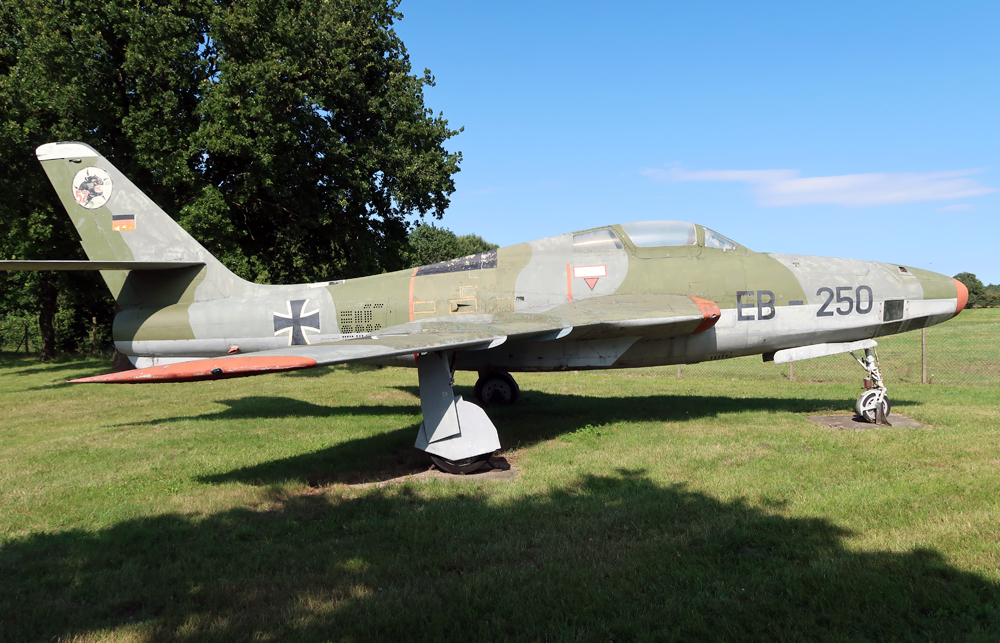
Reconnaissance aircraft RF-84F Thunderflash on German Airforce base Schleswig-Jagel, like flown at the Aufklärungsgeschwader 52

== Publications ==
- Cescotti, Roderich, Kampfflugzeuge und Aufklärer („Bombing aircraft and reconnaissance aircraft“), Bernard & Graefe 1989, ISBN 3-7637-5294-3
- Cescotti, Roderich, Aerospace-Wörterbuch mit Aerospace-Definitionen („Aerospace Dictionary with aerospace definitions“), Motorbuch Verlag 2002, ISBN 3-613-02194-3
- Cescotti, Roderich, Aerospace Wörterbuch Englisch-Deutsch.Deutsch-Englisch („Aerospace Dictionary English-German.German-English“), Motorbuch Verlag 1994, ISBN 3-613-01536-6
- Cescotti, Roderich, Langstreckenflug („Long-Range Flight“), NeunundzwanzigSechs Verlag, Moosburg 2012, ISBN 978-3-9811615-8-8

== Bibliography ==
- Dermot Bradley, Heinz-Peter Würzenthal, Hansgeorg Model (1998), Die Generale und Admirale der Bundeswehr 1955–1997 – Die militärischen Werdegänge, Deutschlands Generale und Admirale, Teil VIb, Dermot Bradley, vol. Band 1, Adam–Fuhr, Osnabrück: Biblio-Verlag, pp. 317–318, ISBN 978-3-7648-2492-1.
- Clemens Range (2013), Kriegsgedient – Die Generale und Admirale der Bundeswehr, Müllheim-Britzingen: Translimes Media Verlag, p. 96, ISBN 978-3-00-043646-8.
- Manfred Sadlowski, ed. (1979), Handbuch der Bundeswehr und der Verteidigungsindustrie, Koblenz/Bonn: Wehr & Wissen, p. 30, ISBN 3-8033-0293-5.
