= Jagdgeschwader 301 =

- Active: 1943–45
- Country: Nazi Germany
- Branch: Luftwaffe
- Type: Fighter Aircraft
- Role: Air superiority
- Size: Air Force Wing

Insignia
- Identification symbol: Yellow/red tailstripe Defense of the Reich

Aircraft flown
- Fighter: Bf 109, Fw 190, Ta 152

Jagdgeschwader 301 (JG 301) was a Luftwaffe fighter-wing of World War II. The order to form JG 301 was issued on 26 September 1943 and formed on 1 October 1943 in Neubiberg with Stab and three Gruppen (groups) as a "Wilde Sau" (wild boar) single-seat night fighter unit.

The Geschwader was equipped with the Bf 109G and was reorganised with four Staffeln per Gruppe. Jagdgeschwader 50, a specialist anti-Mosquito unit, was disbanded in October 1943 and absorbed into I./JG 301. II./JG 301 was redesignated as II./JG 302 on 30 September 1944 and replaced by I./JG 302. II./JG 7 was attached to IV./JG 301 on 24 November 1944 and disbanded on 19 January 1945.

== 1943 ==
During October 1943, while I./JG 301 was formed in Neubiberg from Jagdgeschwader 50, II./JG 301 was formed at Altenburg from elements of II./JG 300. Without its own contingent of fighters, II./JG 301 had to share aircraft that belonged to I./JG 11. In November 1943, the unit was designated as II./JG 302. III./JG 301 was initially raised in October 1943 at Zerbst, but became III./JG 300 during the same month. III./JG 301 was again reformed at Zerbst in November 1943, but was disbanded in May 1944.

JG 301's first Geschwaderkommodore, Oberstleutnant Helmut Weinrich was killed on the night of 18/19 November 1943. Weinrich, a Knight's Cross recipient while serving with Kampfgeschwader 30, crashed after his engine exploded during the landing approach to Frankfurt-Rhein-Main. He shot down a bomber, but his Focke-Wulf Fw 190A-5 sustained heavy damage from return fire.

== 1944 ==
By January 1944, JG 301's establishment was Stab./JG 301 (2 Bf 109G-6), I./JG 301 (26 Bf 109G-6), II./JG 301 (3 Bf 109G-6), and III./JG 301 (30 Bf 109G-6).

In March 1944, 30. Jagddivision (of which JG 301 was a part) was switched to day fighting as a part of Reichsverteidigung (Defense of the Reich). Occasionally, night sorties were still flown. On 24/25 March 1944, I./JG 301 and III./JG 301 engaged RAF Bomber Command formations. Ofw. Hans Todt of 1. Staffel claimed two Lancasters, while Fw. Sieghart of 7. Staffel claimed another. III./JG 301 lost Oblt. Kurt Medinn (8. Staffel) who was killed in combat after shooting down a bomber. Before switching from night operations to purely day interception, units losses exceeded those claimed; however, most losses were not combat-related but were due to poor weather or flying accidents.

Elements of JG 301 then joined defences around the vital oil installations at Ploiești in Romania.

On 24 April 1944, I./JG 301 attacked elements of a United States Army Air Force (USAAF) bomber formation near Munich, downing 4 B-17s. Eight P-51s of the escorting 355th Fighter Group immediately engaged JG 301 in a running battle. Stab./JG 301 and I./JG 301 lost 6 Bf 190G-6s shot down, with 3 killed and 3 wounded. The Gruppenkommandeur Major Walter Bredensbach was badly wounded and crash landed his Bf 109 at Holzkirchen airfield.

480 bombers of the 15th Air Force attacked Ploiești on 31 May 1944. III./JG 77, I./JG 53, and JG 301's 6. and 10. Staffeln intercepted the raid. The Luftwaffe lost 12 planes, 10./JG 301 losing 4 aircraft (and 3 killed). The German fighters claimed 10 heavies and 4 escorts in return, with 10./ JG 301's Fw. Kiehling claiming one P-38 and 6./ JG 301 collectively claiming one B-24, with 2 B-24's badly damaged. The USAAF lost 12 B-24 bombers, 2 P-51s (of the 52nd Fighter Group) and 2 P-38s (of the 1st Fighter Group).

On 6 June 1944 570 bombers, with fighter escort hit the Belgrade marshalling yard and Turnu-Severin canal installations, while B-24s attacked the Ploiești refineries and the marshalling yard at Brașov. II./JG 301 and 10. Staffel JG 301, with JG 53 and III./JG 77 countered the raids. Fw. Gerhard Zeisler (of 10./ JG 301) claimed one B-24 shot down over Târgoviște for his third victory, but was then shot down in his Bf 109 G-6. II./ JG 301 claimed one B-24, while the 15th Air Force lost 1 B-17, 13 B-24s and 2 P-51s.

On 23 June 1944 400 B-17s and B-24s again attacked oil targets in Romania. Aircraft of 6./JG 301 tangled with Mustangs over Bucharest, Ofw. Max Suzgruber claiming one victory. 6. and 10. Staffel hit the attacking bombers, and Uffz. Brenner claimed one B-24 shot down. Two 109s were lost from 10./ JG 301, in return for 6 B-17s, 3 B-24s and 4 P-51s lost.

The 15th Air Force returned to Bucharest on 28 June with 228 bombers. A response from 120 fighters of III./ JG 77, I./ JG 53, II. and IV./ JG 301 claimed 9 B-24s and 3 P-51s. 6./ JG 301 and 10. Staffel each shot down one B-24. The USAAF lost only 3 B-24s, all from the 485th Bombardment Group. The Luftwaffe lost 20 aircraft to the Mustang fighter cover.

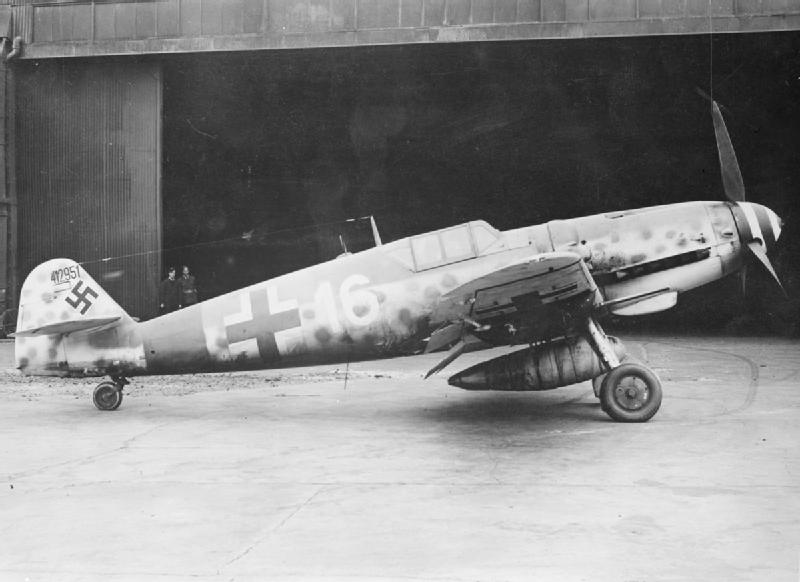
A Messerschmitt Bf 109 of Jagdgeschwader 301. Photographed in British hands after landing by accident at an RAF airfield 21 July 1944, after a Wilde Sau sortie

In June 1944 I Gruppe moved westwards to St. Dizier and later to Epinoy. In the early hours of 21 July Lt. Horst Prenzel (Staffelkapitan 1./JG 301) landed his Bf 109G-6 at RAF Manston by mistake after a 'Wilde Sau' sortie over the invasion area. The RAF evaluated the aircraft at the RAE Farnborough, and then passed to the Air Fighting Development Unit at RAF Wittering in August 1944. The same night Fw Manfred Gromil of 1./JG 301 belly landed his G-6 at Manston, due to lack of fuel.

After re-equipping with the Focke-Wulf 190 A-8, I./JG 302 was redesignated as III./JG 301 on 30 September 1944. In October the unit transferred to Stendal, near Berlin.

On 26 November 1944 JG 301 intercepted three USAAF B-24 bomber formations strung out on a 40-mile front due to a navigation error, around Misburg. Splitting into smaller groups, the fighters attacked in waves from the rear. The 491st Bombardment Group lost 15 B-24's to JG 301's Fw 190 A-8s before the P-51 escort fighters could intervene. Shortly afterwards JG 301 attacked the 445th Bombardment Group. The initial wave shot down at least 5 bombers before the escorts responded, hitting the Geschwader's second wave.

JG 301 claimed some 58 bombers shot down; Oberfeldwebel Hans Müller (2. Staffel) claimed three B-24 Liberators shot down, Lt. Anton Benning a B-24 and a P-51, while Obfw Josef Keil of 10 Staffel claimed two more B-24s.

The USAAF escort fighters of the 355th and 339th Fighter Groups and the 2nd Scouting Force claimed 53 victories for JG 301's worst single day loss in the war, with some 38 pilots of the unit being killed or wounded and 51 Fw 190s lost in action or written off.( Lost 70...100% 48 Fw's plus 50...65% 7 Fw's, 10...45% 9 Fw's )

The next day I. and II. gruppe, JG 301 lost another 14 Fw 190As, with 7 killed and 4 wounded.

The unit's establishment by 30 November 1944 was thus; Stab JG 301; (4 Fw 190 A-9) I./ JG 301; (5 Fw 190 A-8, 18 Fw 190 A-9) II./ JG 301; (10 Fw 190 A-8/R6, 11 Fw 190 A-8/R11, 15 Fw 190 A-9/R 11) III./ JG 301; (50 Fw 190 A-8.)

On 17 December 1944 JG 301 again attacked the USAAF bomber streams near Hannover. I. and II. Gruppe attacked the escorting fighters while III. Gruppe attacked the bombers. Fw. Reschke claimed one B-24 and one P-51 over Göttingen, Ofw. Hans Todt shot down one P-47 while Uffz. Brenner shot down a B-24. Two JG 301 aircraft were lost, for one killed.

== 1945 ==
On 14 January 1945 JG 301 lost 20 pilots killed and 8 wounded as they were attacked by the massed USAAF escort fighters during an operation with JG 300 against the US bomber formations over central Germany. The day marked the first 'Dora 9' loss, from the Geschwader Stabschwarm. The two Geschwaders downed 18 B-17s, 7 P-51s and one P-47.

In early March 1945 Stab./JG 301 became the first unit to receive the Focke-Wulf Ta 152, with an operational brief to provide top cover for the Jagdwaffe airfields in the area.

The first Ta 152 combat sorties were flown on 8 February. On 18 February the Stab moved to Sachau, near Berlin and on 21 February intercepted US bombers, with Oberfeldwebel Josef Keil claiming a B-17 shot down over Berlin. On 1 March Keil claimed a P-51 over the same area. The final victims of the Ta 152 were Soviet Yak-9s during the final days of the battle around Berlin on 30 April 1945.

Encountering fighters on several occasions, the Schwarm lost only two pilots, but shot down at least 9 aircraft. Obfw Josef Keil (11 victories) became the first and only Ta 152 ace, claiming six Allied fighters, while Obfw Willi Reschke claimed the other three.

By April JG 301 was based around Hagenow, Neustadt and Ludwigslust. III./JG 301 were also beginning to be equipped with Ta 152's, although full equipment was not completed before the war's end.

=== Geschwaderkommodore ===
- Oberstleutnant Helmut Weinreich, October 1943 – 19 November 1943
- Major Manfred Mössinger, 19 November 1943 – September 1944
- Oberstleutnant Fritz Aufhammer, September 1944 – May 1945
- Oberstleutnant Helmut Wilhelm Eckrich 1942 – Juli 1945

=== Gruppenkommandeure ===
==== I. Gruppe ====
- Hauptmann Richard Kamp, 1 October 1943 -?
- Major Walter Brede, ?-?
- Hauptmann Wilhelm Burggraf, ? – 21 November 1944
- Hauptmann Gerhard Posselmann, February 1945 – May 1945

==== II. Gruppe ====
- Hauptmann Graf Resugier, 1 October 1943 –
- Hauptmann Herbert Nölter, – 13 April 1945
- Hauptmann Roderich Cescotti, April 1945 – May 1945

==== III. Gruppe ====
- Hauptmann Manfred Mössinger, 1 October 1943 – November 1943
- Major Siegfried Wegner, November 1943 –
- Hauptmann Wilhelm Fulda, October 1944 – November 1944
- Hauptmann Karl-Heinz Dietsche (acting), November 1944 – January 1945
- Major Guth, January 1945 - May 1945

==== IV. Gruppe ====
- Hauptmann Wilfried Schmitz, 24 November 1944 – 4 February 1945
