= List of Focke-Wulf Fw 190 variants =

Fighter aircraft family variants

Fw 190
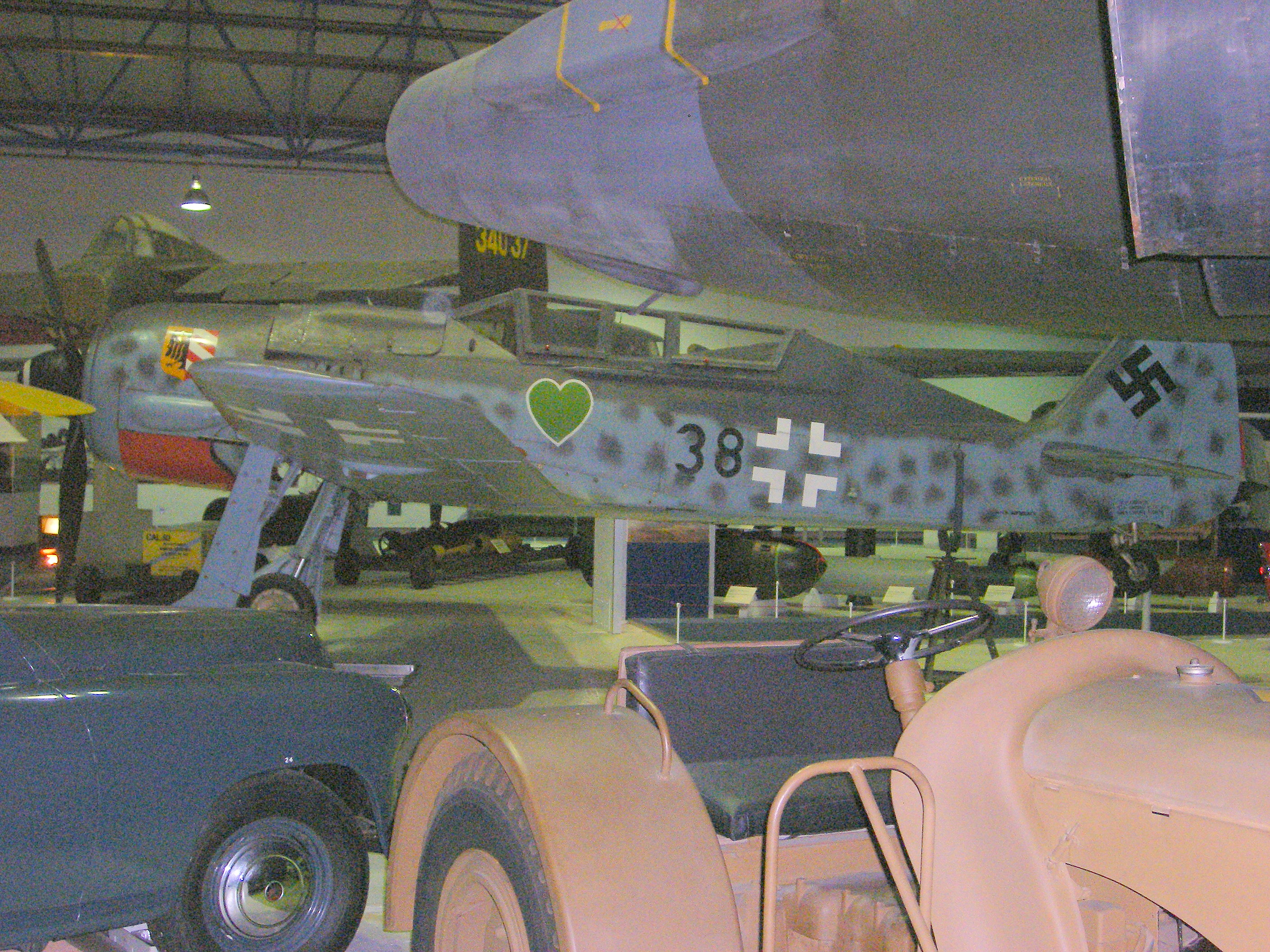
- Side view of S-8 Wk Nr 584219, "Black 38"

General information
- Type: Fighter
- Manufacturer: Primarily Focke-Wulf Flugzeugbau AG, but also AGO, Arado, Fieseler, Mimetall, Norddeutsche Dornier and others
- Designer: Kurt Tank
- Primary users: Luftwaffe Hungarian Air Force; French Air Force; Turkish Air Force
- Number built: Over 20,000

History
- Manufactured: 1941–45; 1946: 65 by SNCAC; 1996: 16 reproductions
- Introduction date: August 1941
- First flight: 1 June 1939
- Retired: 1945 (Luftwaffe); 1949 (France)
- Variant: Ta 152

This is a list of variants of the Focke-Wulf Fw 190, with detailed descriptions.

== First prototypes ==
The first prototype, the Fw 190 V1 (civil registration D-OPZE), powered by a 1,550 metric horsepower [PS] (1,530 hp; 1,140 kW) BMW 139 14-cylinder two-row radial engine, first flew on 1 June 1939. It soon showed exceptional qualities for such a comparatively small aircraft, with excellent handling, good visibility and speed (initially around 610 km/h (380 mph)). The roll rate was 162° per second at 410 km/h (250 mph), but the aircraft had a high stall speed of 205 km/h (127 mph).

The cockpit, located directly behind the engine, became uncomfortably hot. During the first flight, the temperature reached 55 °C (131 °F), after which Focke Wulf's chief test pilot, Hans Sander commented, "It was like sitting with both feet in the fireplace." Flight tests soon showed that the expected benefits of Tank's cooling design did not materialize, so after the first few flights, this arrangement was replaced by a smaller, more conventional spinner that covered only the hub of the three-blade VDM propeller.

In an attempt to increase airflow over the tightly cowled engine, a 10-blade fan was fitted at the front opening of the redesigned cowling and was geared to be driven at 3.12 times faster than the propeller shaft's speed. This quickly became standard on the Fw 190 and nearly all other German aircraft powered by the BMW 801. In this form the V1 first flew on 1 December 1939, having been repainted with the Luftwaffe's Balkenkreuz and with the Stammkennzeichen (factory code) RM+CA.

The Fw 190 V2, designated with the Stammkennzeichen alphabetic ID code of FL+OZ (later RM+CB) first flew on 31 October 1939 and was equipped from the outset with the new spinner and cooling fan. It was armed with one Rheinmetall-Borsig 7.92 mm (.312 in) MG 17 machine gun and one 13 mm (.51 in) synchronized MG 131 machine gun in each wing root.

== Later prototypes, BMW 801 ==
Even before the first flight of the Fw 190 V1, BMW was bench testing a larger, more powerful 14-cylinder two-row radial engine, the BMW 801. This engine introduced a pioneering example of an engine management system called the Kommandogerät (command-device): in effect, an electro-mechanical computer which set mixture, propeller pitch (for the constant speed propeller), boost, and magneto timing. This reduced the pilot's work load to moving the throttle control only, with the rest of the associated inputs handled by the Kommandogerät. The drawback was slight and minor surges that made the Fw 190 harder to fly in close formations. Tank asserted the device did not work well.

Another problem was the violent switching in of the high gear of the supercharger as the aircraft climbed. During a test flight, Tank carried out a loop at medium altitude. Just as he was nearing the top of the loop, at 2,650 m (8,690 ft), the supercharger's high gear kicked in with a jerk. The Fw 190 was on its back, with little airspeed. The sudden change in torque hurled the aircraft into a spin. Tank's artificial horizon toppled (the cause is not explained). Although Tank did not know whether he was in an upright or inverted spin, he managed to recover after a loss of altitude. The rough transition was smoothed out and the supercharger's gear-change could engage without incident.

The RLM convinced Focke-Wulf and BMW to abandon the 139 engine in favor of the new engine. The BMW 801 engine was similar in diameter to the 139, although it was heavier and longer by a considerable margin. This required Tank to redesign the Fw 190, and resulted in the abandonment of the V3 and V4. The V5 became the first prototype with the new engine, being fitted with the 1,560 PS (1,540 hp; 1,150 kW) BMW 801 C-0. Much of the airframe was strengthened and in order to balance the heavier engine, the cockpit was moved back in the fuselage and the engine mounted on longer struts. This had the side-effect of reducing the troubles with high temperatures and for the first time provided space for nose armament. It also reduced visibility in nose-high attitudes, notably when taxiing on the ground.

A 12-blade cooling fan replaced the earlier 10-blade unit, and was likewise installed in front of the engine's reduction gear housing, still running with the original 3.12:1 reduction ratio, which was standardized for BMW-powered Fw 190s. The propeller shaft passed through the fan's central plate, which was made of cast magnesium. The fan provided cooling air not only for the engine cylinders' fins, but also for the BMW-designed annular oil cooler, which was located in the forward part of the cowling, likewise designed by the engine firm and used on all BMW 801-powered aircraft as part of the later "unitized" Kraftei engine mounting concept. The oil cooler was protected by an armored ring which made up the front face of the cowling. A small hole in the centre of the spinner also directed airflow to ancillary components. Even with the new engine and the cooling fan, the 801 suffered from high rear-row cylinder head temperatures, which in at least one case resulted in the detonation of the fuselage-mounted MG 17 ammunition.

The vertical tail shape was also changed and the rudder tab was replaced by a metal trim strip adjustable only on the ground. New, stiffer undercarriage struts were introduced, along with larger diameter wheels. The retraction mechanism was changed from hydraulic to electrically powered, which became a hallmark of later Focke-Wulf aircraft system designs, and new strut door fairings of a simplified design were fitted to the legs. Another minor change was that the rearmost sections of the sliding canopy were redesigned by replacing the plexiglas glazing with duralumin panels. As this section was behind the pilot's seat, there was little visibility lost.

At first, the V5 used the same wings as the first two prototypes, but to allow for the larger tires, the wheel wells were enlarged by moving forward part of the leading edge of the wing root; the wing area became 15.0 m^{2} (161 ft^{2}). The V5 first flew in the early spring of 1940. The weight increase with all of the modifications was substantial, about 635 kg (1,400 lb), leading to higher wing loading and a deterioration in handling. Plans were made to create a new wing with more area to address these issues. In its original form, this prototype was called the V5k for kleine Fläche (small surface).

In August 1940 a collision with a ground vehicle damaged the V5 and it was sent back to the factory for major repairs. This was an opportune time to rebuild it with a new wing which was less tapered in plan than the original design, extending the leading and trailing edges outward to increase the area. The new wing had an area of 18.30 m^{2} (197.0 ft^{2}), and now spanned 10.506 metres (34 feet 5.6 inches). After conversion, the aircraft was called the V5g for große Fläche (large surface). Although it was 10 km/h (6.2 mph) slower than when fitted with the small wing, V5g was much more maneuverable and had a faster climb rate. This new wing platform was to be used for all major production versions of the Fw 190.

== Pre-production, Fw 190 A-0 ==
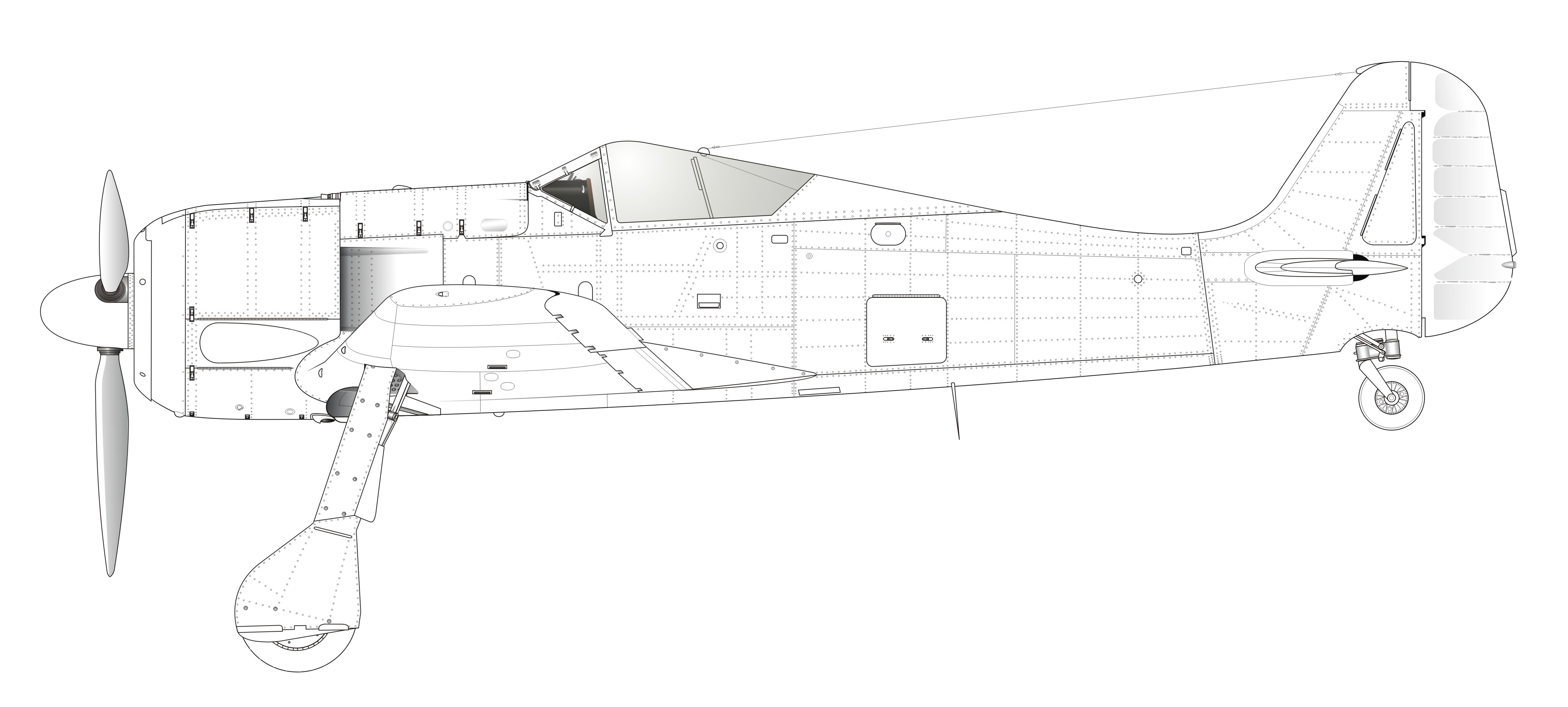
Side-view of Fw 190 A-0

The pre-production Fw 190 A-0 series was ordered in November 1940, a total of 28 being completed. Because they were built before the new wing design was fully tested and approved, the first nine A-0s were fitted with the original small wings. All were armed with six 7.92 mm (.312 in) MG 17 machine guns — four synchronized weapons, two in the forward fuselage and one in each wing root, supplemented by a free-firing MG 17 in each wing, outboard of the propeller disc. They differed from later A-series Fw 190s in that they had shorter spinners, the armored cowling ring was a different shape, with a scalloped hinge on the upper, forward edge of the upper engine cowling, and the bulges covering the interior air intakes on the engine cowlings were symmetrical "teardrops". The panels aft of the exhaust pipes had no cooling slots. Several of these aircraft were later modified for testing engines and special equipment.

The first unit to be equipped with the A-0 was Erprobungsstaffel 190, formed in March 1941 to help iron out any technical problems and approve the new fighter before it would be accepted for full operational service in mainstream Luftwaffe Jagdgeschwader. At first, this unit, commanded by Oblt. Otto Behrens, was based at the Luftwaffe's central Erprobungsstelle facility at Rechlin, but it was soon moved to Le Bourget. Engine problems plagued the 190 for much of its early development, and the entire project was threatened several times with a complete shutdown. Had it not been for the input of Behrens and Karl Borris, both of whom had originally enlisted in the Luftwaffe as mechanics, the Fw 190 program might have died before reaching the front lines. Both men indicated that the Fw 190's outstanding qualities outweighed its deficiencies during several Ministry of Aviation commissions that considered terminating the program. Some 50 modifications were required before the Ministry of Aviation approved the Fw 190 for deployment to Luftwaffe units.

== Fw 190 A ==
=== A-1 ===
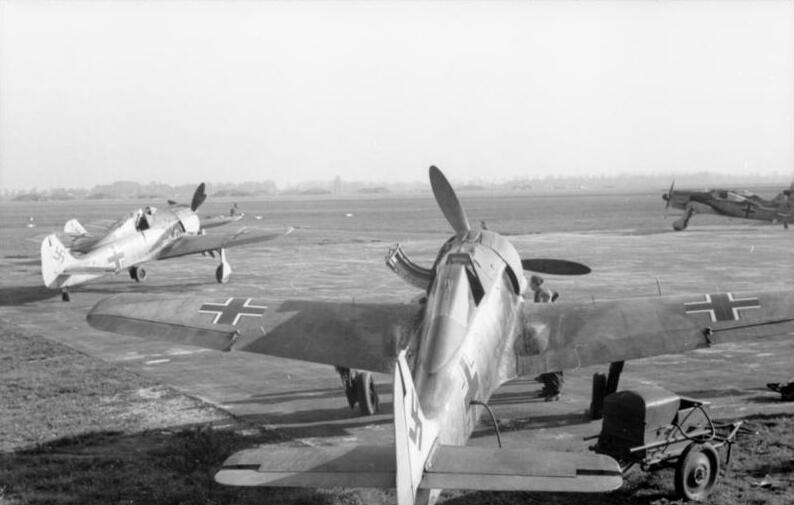
Fw 190 A-0s or A-1s of an unknown unit.

The Fw 190 A-1 rolled off the assembly lines in June 1941. The first few models were shipped to the Erprobungsstaffel (formerly from II./JG 26 Schlageter) for further testing. Following this testing, the Fw 190 A-1 entered service with II./JG 26, stationed near Paris, France. The A-1 was equipped with the BMW 801 C-1 engine, rated at 1,560 PS (1,540 hp; 1,150 kW) for take-off. Armament consisted of two fuselage-mounted 7.92 mm (.312 in) MG 17s, two wing root-mounted 7.92 mm (.312 in) MG 17s - with all four MG 17s synchronized to fire through the propeller arc - and two outboard wing-mounted 20 mm MG FF/Ms. The new longer propeller spinner and the cowling bulges, which became asymmetrical "teardrops" in shape, remained the same for the rest of the A-series. The panel immediately behind the exhaust outlets was unslotted, although some A-1s were retrofitted with cooling slots. A new hood jettisoning system, operated by an MG FF cartridge, was introduced. The pilot's head armor changed in shape and was supported by two thin metal struts in a "V" shape attached to the canopy sides. The standard radio fitted was the FuG 7, although some A-1s were also equipped with FuG 25 "Erstling" IFF (identification friend or foe) equipment. The A-1 models still suffered from the overheating that prototype Fw 190s had experienced during testing. After only 30–40 hours of use (sometimes less), many of these early engines had to be replaced. Focke-Wulf completed 102 A-1s at the Bremen and Marienburg factories between June and October 1941. Also in October, a further order of 315 A-1s, subcontracted to AGO Flugzeugwerke at its Oschersleben factory, began to be built as A-2s.

=== A-2 ===
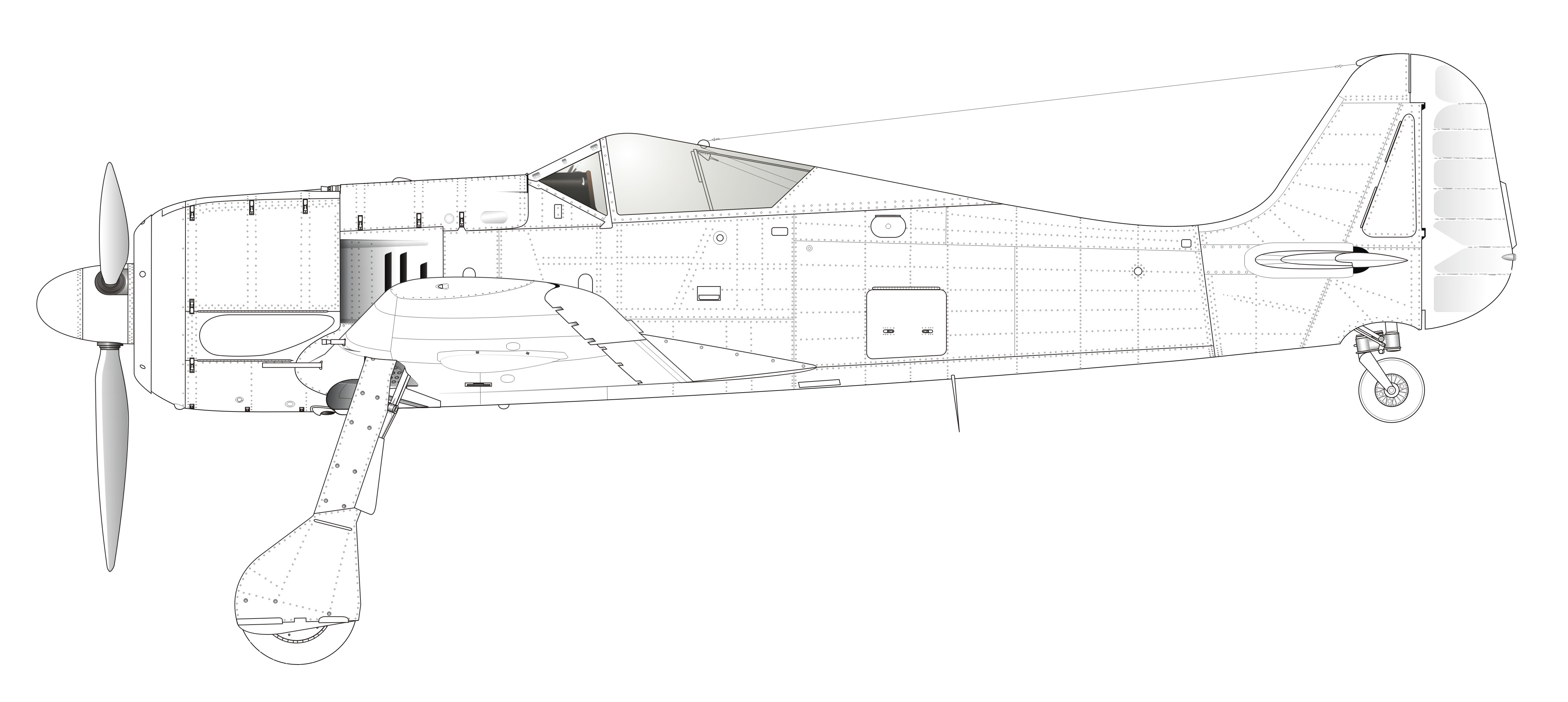
Side-view of Fw 190 A-2; the most notable change over the A-0 was the addition of three vertical cooling slits on the engine cowling, just forward of the wing.

The introduction of the BMW 801 C-2 resulted in the Fw 190 A-2 model, first introduced in October 1941. As part of this upgrade, a modification to the exhaust system devised by III./JG 26's Technical Officer ("T.O.") Rolf Schrödeter was added. There were 13 exhausts for the 14 cylinders; eight of these were grouped to exit, four on each side, along the forward fuselage, just above the leading edge of the wing; under the forward center section, between the undercarriage bays were five exhaust stacks, with cylinders 9 and 10 sharing a common pipe. To quickly implement the fix, it was found that the re-routing could be done easily in Gruppe workshops. The reduction in temperature affecting the bottom cylinder went a long way to solving the problem. The addition of new ventilation slots on the side of the fuselage further aided cooling, and with the widespread availability of the A-2 in the spring of 1942, the overheating problems were greatly reduced.

The A-2 wing weaponry was updated, with the two wing root-mounted 7.92 mm (.312 in) MG 17s being replaced by 20 mm MG 151/20E cannon. With the introduction of the new cannon, the Revi C12/C gunsight was upgraded to the new C12/D model. The introduction of the A-2 marked a shift in air supremacy from the British, with their Spitfire Mk V, to the Germans. (Note: Experience proved that air-cooled radial engines were more resilient than liquid-cooled inline engines under combat conditions. A single bullet or piece of shrapnel in the radiator or coolant pipes of liquid-cooled engines was often enough to drain the system, eventually causing the engine to seize or catch fire. On several occasions Fw 190s withstood an entire cylinder's being shot away.) German production records make no real distinction between A-2s and A-3s, which were very similar aircraft: the total combined production was 910 airframes between October 1941 and August 1942. In addition to Focke-Wulf and AGO, a new subcontractor, Arado, built A-2s and A-3s at Warnemünde.

=== A-3 ===
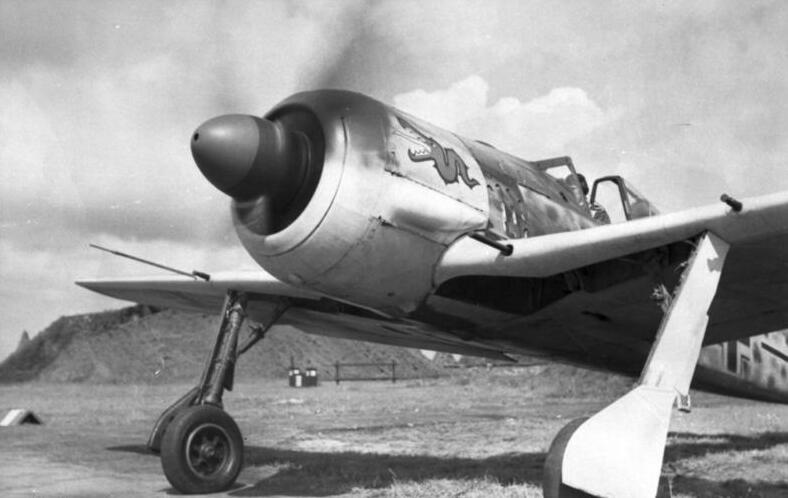
Fw 190A-3 of JG 1 in the Netherlands, summer 1942.

The Fw 190 A-3 was equipped with the BMW 801 D-2 engine, which increased power to 1,700 PS (1,700 hp; 1,300 kW) at takeoff by improving the supercharger and raising the compression ratio. Because of these changes, the A-3 model required a higher octane fuel—100 (C3) versus 87 (B4). The A-3 retained the same weaponry as the A-2. The A-3 also introduced the Umrüst-Bausätze factory conversion sets. The Fw 190 A-3/U1 and U2 were single experimental Fw 190s: U1 (W.Nr 130270) was the first 190 to have the engine mount extended by 15 cm (5.9 in), which would be standardized on the later production A-5 model. The U2 (W.Nr 130386) had RZ 65 73 mm (2.9 in) rocket launcher racks under the wings with three rockets per wing. There were also a small number of U7 aircraft tested as high-altitude fighters armed with only two 20 mm MG 151 cannon, but with reduced overall weight.

The Fw 190 A-3/U3 was the first of the Jabo (Jagdbomber), using an ETC-501 centerline bomb rack able to carry up to 500 kg (1,100 lb) of bombs or, with horizontal stabilizing bars, one 300 L (80 US gal) drop tank. The U3 retained the fuselage-mounted 7.92 mm (.312 in) MG 17s and the wing-mounted 20 mm MG 151 cannon, with the outer MG FF being removed. (Note: All Fw 190s which carried the centerline racks had their inner wheel well doors removed and replaced by fixed fairings which were, in effect, a cutaway door. These fixed fairings incorporated a raised deflector to prevent hot exhaust gases from the lower exhausts spilling over onto the tires. When these fairings were used an additional small plate was fixed to the lower lip of the undercarriage leg fairings.)

The Fw 190 A-3/U4 was a reconnaissance version with two RB 12.5 cameras in the rear fuselage and an EK 16 gun camera or a Robot II miniature camera in the leading edge of the port wing root. Armament was similar to the U3, however, and the ETC 501 was usually fitted with a 300 L (80 US gal) drop tank. See A-2 for production numbers.

In autumn 1942, a political decision diverted 72 new aircraft to Turkey in an effort to keep that country friendly to the Axis powers. These were designated Fw 190 A-3a (a=ausländisch (foreign), designation for export models) and delivered between October 1942 and March 1943. The Turkish aircraft had the same armament as the A-1: four 7.92 mm (.312 in) synchronized MG 17 machine guns and two 20 mm MG FF cannon. There was no FuG 25 IFF device in the radio equipment.

Fw 190 A-3/U1 — (W.Nr 130 270) was the first 190 to have the engine mount extended by 15 cm (5.9 in), which would be standardized on the later production A-5 model. (U - Umrüst-Bausatz)

Fw 190 A-3/U2 — The A-3/U2 (W.Nr 130386) had RZ 65 73 mm (2.9 in) rocket launcher racks under the wings with three rockets per wing. There were also a small number of U7 aircraft tested as high-altitude fighters armed with only two 20 mm MG 151 cannon, but with reduced overall weight.

Fw 190 A-3/U3 — The A-3/U3 was the first of the Jabo (Jagdbomber), using an ETC-501 centre-line bomb rack able to carry up to 500 kg (1,100 lb) of bombs or, with horizontal stabilising bars, one 300 L (80 US gal) standard Luftwaffe drop tank. The U3 retained the fuselage-mounted 7.92 mm (.312 in) MG 17s and the wing-mounted 20 mm MG 151 cannon, with the outer MG FF being removed.

Fw 190 A-3/U4 — The A-3/U4 was a reconnaissance version with two RB 12.5 cameras in the rear fuselage and a EK 16 gun camera or a Robot II miniature camera in the leading edge of the port wing root. Armament was similar to the U3, however, and the ETC 501 was usually fitted with the standardized Luftwaffe 300-litre-capacity (80 US gal) drop tank.

Fw 190 A-3a (a=ausländisch — foreign) In autumn 1942, 72 new aircraft were delivered to Turkey in an effort to keep that country friendly to the Axis powers. These were designated Fw 190 A-3a, designation for export models and delivered between October 1942 and March 1943.

=== A-4 ===
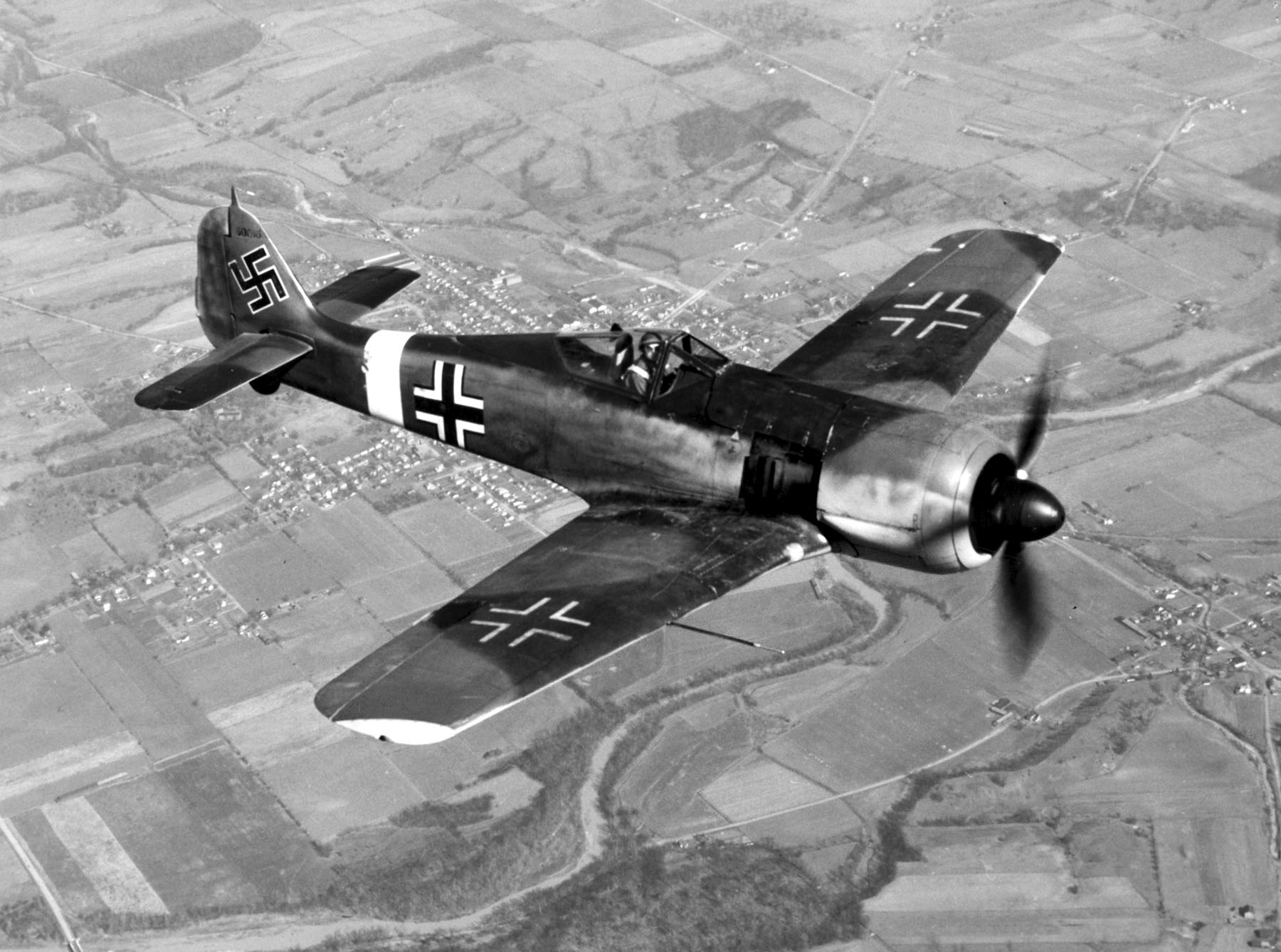
A captured FW-190A. The aircraft was repainted while being tested by the USAAF. The markings are incorrect in size, proportion, and location. This plane has the cowling extension (see wing root), and so is an A-5 or later model. If its cowling machine guns were faired over at the factory, this may be an FW-190G.

Introduced in July 1942, the Fw 190 A-4 was equipped with the same engine and basic armament as the A-3. Updated radio gear, the FuG 16Z, was installed, replacing the earlier FuG VIIa. A new, short "stub" vertical aerial mount was fitted to the top of the tail fin, a configuration which was kept through the rest of the production Fw 190s. In some instances, pilot-controllable engine cooling vents were fitted to the fuselage sides in place of the plain slots. Some A-4s were outfitted with a special Rüstsatz field conversion kit, comprising the fitting of a pair of under-wing Werfer-Granate 21 (BR 21) rocket mortars, and were designated Fw 190 A-4/R6. The most important innovation introduced by the A-4 was, however, the fitting of various Umrüst-Bausätze factory-refit packages.

The A-4/U1 was outfitted with an ETC 501 rack under the fuselage. All armament except for the MG 151 cannon was removed. The U3 was very similar to the U1, and later served as the prototype for the Fw 190 F-1 assault fighter. Some U3s used for night operations had a landing light mounted in the leading edge of the left wing-root. The U4 was a reconnaissance fighter, with two Rb 12.4 cameras in the rear fuselage and an EK 16 or Robot II gun camera. The U4 was equipped with fuselage-mounted 7.92 mm (.312 in) MG 17s and 20 mm MG 151 cannon. The U7 was a high-altitude fighter, easily identified by the compressor air intakes on either side of the cowling. Adolf Galland flew a U7 in the spring of 1943.

The A-4/U8 was the Jabo-Rei (Jagdbomber Reichweite, long-range fighter-bomber), adding a 300 L (80 US gal) drop tank under each wing, on VTr-Ju 87 racks with duralumin fairings produced by Weserflug, and a centerline bomb rack. The outer wing-mounted 20 mm MG FF/M cannon and the cowling-mounted 7.92 mm (.312 in) MG 17 were removed to save weight. The A-4/U8 served as the model for the Fw 190 G-1.

A new series of easier-to-install Rüstsatz field kits began to be produced in 1943. The first of these, the A-4/R1, was fitted with a FuG 16ZY radio set with a Morane "whip" aerial fitted under the port wing. These aircraft, called Leitjäger or Fighter Formation Leaders, could be tracked and directed from the ground via special R/T equipment called Y-Verfahren (Y-Control). More frequent use of this equipment was made from the A-5 onwards. The Fw 190A-4 could achieve 1,700 hp (2,100 with MW-50 boost). Its maximum speed was 670 km/h (420 mph) at 6,250 m (20,510 ft). Operational ceiling was 11,400 m (37,400 ft). Normal range was 800 km (500 mi). Normal takeoff weight was 3,800 kg (8,400 lb). A total of 976 A-4s were built between June 1942 and March 1943.

Fw 190 A-4/R6) — Some A-4s were fitted with a pair of under-wing Werfer-Granate 21 (BR 21) rocket mortars, and were designated Fw 190 A-4/R6. (R - Rüstsatz)

Fw 190 A-4/U1 — The A-4/U1 was outfitted with an ETC 501 rack under the fuselage. All armament except the MG 151 cannon was removed.

Fw 190 A-4/U3 — The A-4/U3 was very similar to the U1, and later served as the prototype for the Fw 190 F-1 assault fighter.

Fw 190 A-4/U4 — The A-4/U4 was a reconnaissance fighter, with two Rb 12.4 cameras in the rear fuselage and an EK 16 or Robot II gun camera. The U4 was equipped with fuselage-mounted 7.92 mm (.312 in) MG 17s and 20 mm MG 151 cannon.

Fw 190 A-4/U7 — The A-4/U7 was a high-altitude fighter, easily identified by the compressor air intakes on either side of the cowling. Adolf Galland flew a U7 in the spring of 1943.

Fw 190 A-4/U8 — The A-4/U8 was the Jabo-Rei (Jagdbomber Reichweite, long-range fighter-bomber), adding twin standard Luftwaffe 300 L (80 US gal) drop tanks, one under each wing, on VTr-Ju 87 racks with duralumin fairings produced by Weserflug, and a centreline bomb rack. The outer wing-mounted 20 mm MG FF/M cannon and the cowling-mounted 7.92 mm (.312 in) MG 17 were removed to save weight. The A-4/U8 was the precursor of the Fw 190 G-1.

Fw 190 A-4/R1 — The A-4/R1, was fitted with a FuG 16ZY radio set with a Morane "whip" aerial fitted under the port wing. These aircraft, called Leitjäger or Fighter Formation Leaders, could be tracked and directed from the ground via special R/T equipment called Y-Verfahren (Y-Control). More frequent use of this equipment was made from the A-5 onwards.

=== A-5 ===
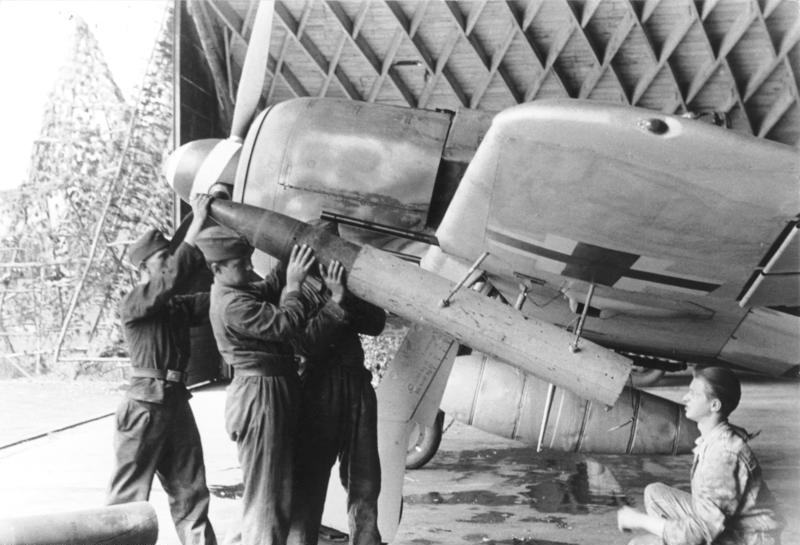
Fw 190A-8 with the under-wing WGr 21 rocket-propelled mortar. The weapon was developed from the 21 cm Nebelwerfer 42 infantry weapon.

The Fw 190 A-5 was developed after it was determined that the Fw 190 could easily carry more ordnance. The D-2 engine was moved forward another 15 cm (5.9 in) as had been tried out earlier on the service test A-3/U1 aircraft, moving the center of gravity forward to allow more weight to be carried aft. Some A-5s were tested with the MW 50 installation: this was a mix of 50% methyl alcohol and 50% water, which could be injected into the engine to produce a short-term power boost to 2,000 PS (2,000 hp; 1,500 kW), but this system was not adopted for serial production, yet. New radio gear, including FuG 25a Erstling IFF, and an electric artificial horizon found their way into the A-5. The A-5 retained the same basic armament as the A-4.

The A-5 too, saw several Umrüst-Bausätze kits. The U2 was designed as a night Jabo-Rei and featured anti-reflective fittings and exhaust flame dampeners. A centerline ETC 501 rack typically held a 250 kg (550 lb) bomb, and wing-mounted racks mounted 300 L drop tanks. An EK16 gun camera, as well as landing lights, were fitted to the wing leading edge. The U2 was armed with only two 20 mm MG 151 cannon. The U3 was a Jabo fighter fitted with ETC 501s for drop tanks and bombs; it too featured only two MG 151s for armament. The U4 was a "recon" fighter with two RB 12.5 cameras and all armament of the basic A-5 with the exception of the MG FF cannon. The A-5/U8 was another Jabo-Rei outfitted with SC-250 centerline-mounted bombs, under-wing 300-liter drop tanks and only two MG 151s; it later became the Fw 190 G-2. A special U12 was created for bomber attack, outfitted with the standard 7.92 mm (.312 in) MG 17 and 20 mm MG 151 but replacing the outer wing 20 mm MG-FF cannon with two underwing gun pods containing two 20 mm MG 151/20 each, for a total of two machine guns and six cannon. The A-5/U12 was the prototype installation of what was known as the R1 package from the A-6 onwards. The A-5/R11 was a night fighter conversion fitted with FuG 217 Neptun (Neptune) mid-VHF band radar equipment with arrays of three dipole antenna elements vertically mounted fore and aft of the cockpit and above and below the wings. Flame-dampening boxes were fitted over the exhaust exits. 1,752 A-5s were built from November 1942 to June 1943.

Fw 190 A-5/U2 — The A-5/U2 was designed as a night Jabo-Rei and featured anti-reflective fittings and exhaust flame dampers. A centre-line ETC 501 rack typically held a 250 kg (550 lb) bomb, and wing-mounted racks mounted 300 L drop tanks. A EK16 gun camera, as well as landing lights, were fitted to the wing leading edge. The U2 was armed with only two 20 mm MG 151 cannon.

Fw 190 A-5/U3 — The A-5/U3 was a Jabo fighter fitted with ETC 501s for drop tanks and bombs; it too featured only two MG 151s for armament.

Fw 190 A-5/U4 — The A-5/U4 was a "recon" fighter with two RB 12.5 cameras and all armament of the basic A-5 with the exception of the MG FF cannon.

Fw 190 A-5/U8 — The A-5/U8 was another Jabo-Rei outfitted with SC-250 centreline-mounted bombs, under-wing 300-litre drop tanks and only two MG 151s; it later became the Fw 190 G-2.

Fw 190 A-5/U9 — Test installation of the A-7 modifications.

Fw 190 A-5/U12 — A special U12 was created for bomber attack, outfitted with the standard 7.92 mm (.312 in) MG 17 and 20 mm MG 151 but replacing the outer wing 20 mm MG-FF cannon with two underwing gun pods containing two 20 mm MG 151/20 each, for a total of two machine guns and six cannon.

Fw 190 A-5/R11 — The A-5/R11 was a night fighter conversion fitted with FuG 217 Neptun (Neptune) radar equipment with arrays of three dipole antenna elements vertically mounted fore and aft of the cockpit and above and below the wings. Flame-dampening boxes were fitted over the exhaust exits. 1,752 A-5s were built from November 1942 to June 1943.

=== A-6 ===
The Fw 190 A-6 was developed to address shortcomings found in previous "A" models when attacking U.S. heavy bombers. Modifications of the type to date had caused the weight of the aircraft to creep up. To combat this and to allow better weapons to be installed in the wings, a structurally redesigned lighter, stronger wing was introduced. The normal wing armament was increased to four 20 mm MG 151/20E wing root and outer wing cannon with larger ammunition boxes while retaining the two MG 17 fuselage machine guns. New electrical sockets and reinforced weapon mounts were fitted internally in the wings to allow the installation of either 20 mm or 30 mm (1.18 in) ammunition boxes as well as for underwing armament. Because the outer wing MG 151s were mounted lower than the MG/FFs, new, larger hatches incorporating bulges and cartridge discharge chutes, were incorporated into the wing lower surfaces. It is believed the fuselage MG 17s were kept because their tracer rounds served as a targeting aid for the pilots. A new FuG 16 ZE radio navigation system was fitted in conjunction with a FuG 10 ZY. A loop aerial for radio navigation, mounted on a small "teardrop" base was fitted under the rear fuselage, offset slightly to port, with an additional short "whip" aerial aft of this. These aerials were fitted on all later Fw 190 variants.

The A-6 was outfitted in numerous ways with various sets, Rüstsätze (field modification kits); more flexible than the factory upgrade kits for previous versions, these field upgrade kits allowed the A-6 to be refitted in the field as missions demanded. At least 963 A-6s were built from July 1943 ending in April 1944, according to Ministry of Aviation acceptance reports and Focke-Wulf production books. In late 1943, the Erla Maschinenwerke's Antwerp factory designed a simpler rack/drop-tank fitting, which was more streamlined than the bulky ETC 501 and could be quickly fitted or removed. Several A-6s, A-7s and A-8s of JG 26 were fitted with these racks (one such aircraft was A-8 W.Nr.170346 Black 13 flown by Obstlt. Josef Priller during the Normandy invasion on 6 June 1944.)

=== A-7 ===
The Fw 190 A-7 was a production derivative of the Fw 190 A-5/U9 prototype, and entered production in November 1943. Production totaled only 80 aircraft before the advent of the Fw 190A-8. The A-7 had a maximum take-off weight of 8,818 pounds (4,000 kg). The A-7 was equipped with the BMW 801 D-2 engine, again producing 1,700 PS (1,700 hp; 1,300 kW). The BMW 801 D-2 is a two-row radial engine with fourteen cylinders. Designed to combat the USAAF's heavy bombers, the basic armament was upgraded to include two fuselage-mounted 13 mm (.51 in) MG 131s, replacing the MG 17s. Because the larger-breeched MG 131s had to be mounted further apart, the upper gun cowling, just in front of the cockpit, was modified with faired bulges and a new upper engine cowling was manufactured. This left insufficient room for the three cowling toggle latches, which were moved to the side panels. The rest of the armament fit stayed the same as earlier versions; two wing root-mounted 20 mm MG 151s and two outer wing-mounted 20 mm MG 151s. The Revi gunsight was updated to the new 16B model. The additional weight of the new weapon systems required strengthening of the wheels, adding a reinforced rim to better deal with typical combat airfield conditions. The A-7 was usually outfitted with the centerline-mounted ETC 501 rack. There were several major Rüstsätze for the A-7, many including Werfer-Granate 21 WGr 21 rockets. A total of 701 A-7s were produced from November 1943 to April 1944, according to Ministry of Aviation acceptance reports and Focke-Wulf production books.

=== A-8 ===
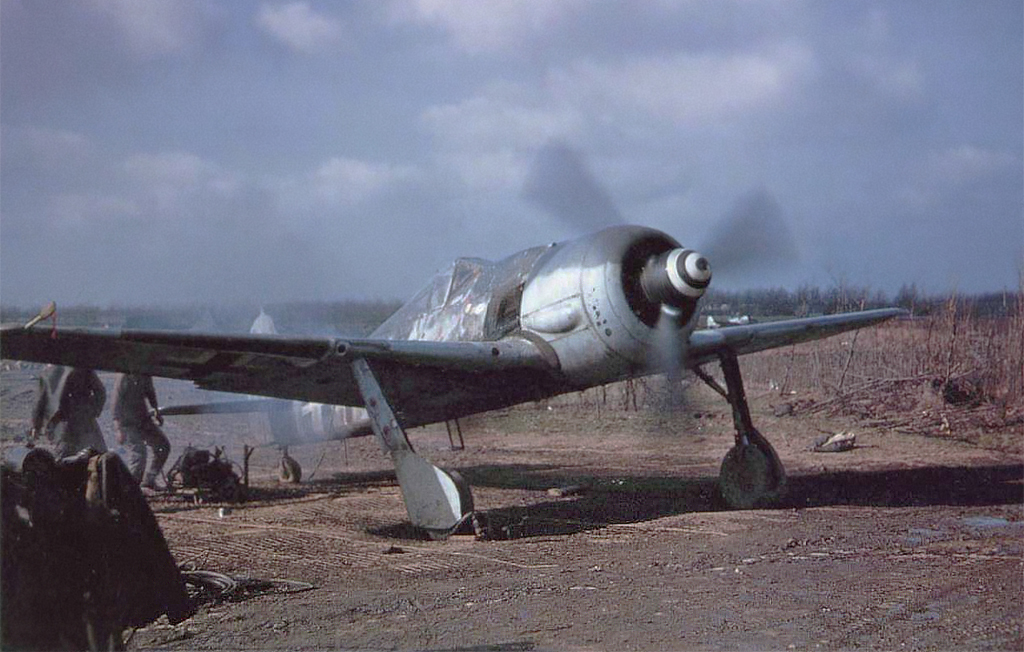
An Fw 190 A-8/R2 in American hands. "White 11" of 5./JG 4 was captured during Operation Bodenplatte after its engine had been damaged by American light flak.

The Fw 190 A-8 entered production in February 1944, powered either by the standard BMW 801 D-2 or the 801Q (also known as 801TU). The 801Q/TU, with the "T" signifying a Triebwerksanlage unitized powerplant installation specifically for single-engined aircraft, was a standard 801D with improved, thicker armour on the front annular cowling, which also incorporated the oil tank, upgraded from 6 mm (0.24 in) on earlier models to 10 mm (0.39 in). Changes introduced in the Fw 190 A-8 also included the C3-injection Erhöhte Notleistung emergency boost system to the fighter variant of the Fw 190 A (a similar system with less power had been fitted to some earlier Jabo variants of the 190 A), raising power to 1,980 PS (1,950 hp; 1,460 kW) for a short time. The Erhöhte Notleistung system operated by spraying additional fuel into the fuel/air mix, cooling it and allowing higher boost pressures to be run, but at the cost of much higher fuel consumption. From the A-8 on, Fw 190s could be fitted with a new paddle-bladed wooden propeller, easily identified by its wide blades with curved tips. A new outwardly bulged main canopy glazing format, more in the manner of a Malcolm hood rather than a bubble canopy, with greatly improved vision sideways and forward, had been developed for the F-2 ground attack model, but was often seen fitted at random on A-8s, F-8s and G-8s. The new canopy included a larger piece of head armor which was supported by reinforced bracing and a large fairing. A new internal fuel tank with a capacity of 115 L (30 US gal) was fitted behind the cockpit, which meant that the radio equipment had to be moved forward to just behind the pilot.

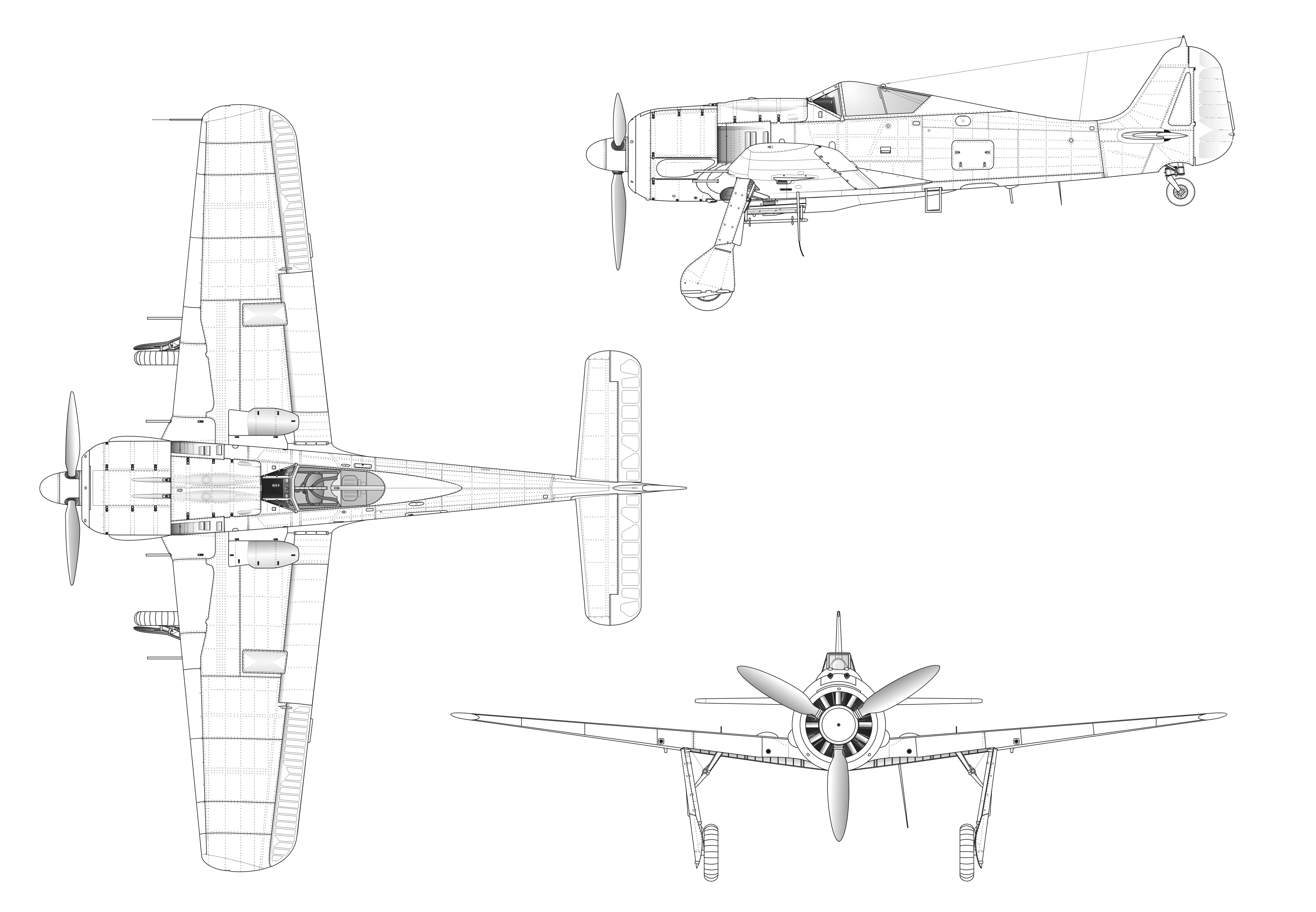
Three-side-view of Fw 190 A-8

Externally, a large round hatch was incorporated into the lower fuselage to enable the new tank to be installed, and the pilot's oxygen bottles were moved aft and positioned around this hatch. A fuel filler was added to the port side, below the rear canopy and a rectangular radio access hatch was added to starboard. Other changes included an ETC 501 under-fuselage rack which was mounted on a lengthened carrier and moved 200 mm (7.9 in) further forward to help restore the center of gravity of the aircraft. This fuselage would form the basis for all later variants of the Fw 190 and the Ta 152 series. The Morane "whip" aerial for the Y-Verfahren was fitted as standard under the port wing, just aft of the wheelwell. Nearly a dozen Rüstsätze kits were made available for the A-8, including the famous A-8/R2 and A-8/R8 Sturmbock models. The A-8/R2 replaced the outer wing 20 mm cannon with a 30 mm (1.2 in) MK 108 cannon. The A-8/R8 was similar, but fitted with heavy armour including 30 mm (1.2 in) canopy and windscreen armor and 5 mm (0.20 in) cockpit armor. The A-8 was the most numerous of the Fw 190 As, with over 6,655 A-8 airframes produced from March 1944 to May 1945. A-8s were produced by at least eight factories during its lifetime.

Fw 190 A-8/R2 — The A-8/R2 replaced the outer wing 20 mm cannon with a 30 mm (1.18 in) MK 108 cannon.

Fw 190 A-8/R4 — The A-8/R4 featured GM1 nitrous boost to the standard BMW 801 D/Q engine. GM1 (nitrous oxide) injection increased power for short amounts of time, up to 10 minutes at a time. A 20 minute supply was usually carried.

Fw 190 A-8/R8 — The A-8/R8 was similar to the A-8/R2, but fitted with heavy armour including 30 mm (1.2 in) canopy and windscreen armour and 5 mm (0.20 in) cockpit armour.

=== A-9 ===
The Fw 190 A-9 was the last A-model produced, and was first built in September 1944. The A-9 was fitted with the new BMW 801S, called the 801 TS or 801 TH when shipped as a more complete Triebwerksanlage version of the modular Kraftei or "power egg" concept, unitized engine installation (an aircraft engine installation format embraced by the Luftwaffe for a number of engine types on operational aircraft, in part for easy field replacement) rated at 2,000 PS (2,000 hp; 1,500 kW); the more powerful 2,400 PS (2,400 hp; 1,800 kW) BMW 801F-1 was still under development, and not yet available. The armor on the front annular cowling, which also incorporated the oil tank, was upgraded from the 6 mm (0.24 in) on earlier models to 10 mm (0.39 in). The 12-blade cooling fan was initially changed to a 14-blade fan, but it consumed more power to operate and did not really improve cooling; thus BMW reverted to the 12-blade fan. The A-9 cowling was slightly longer than that of the A-8 due to a larger annular radiator within the forward cowl for the oil system. The bubble canopy design with the larger head armour was fitted as standard. Three types of propeller were authorized for use on the A-9: the VDM 9-112176A wooden propeller, 3.5 metres (11 feet 6 inches) in diameter, was the preferred option, however, many A-9s were fitted with the standard Vereinigte Deutsche Metallwerke (VDM) 9-12067A metal propeller and some had a VDM 9-12153A metal propeller with external, bolt on balance weights. The A-9 was also designed originally as an assault aircraft, so the wing leading edges were to have been armoured; however, this did not make it past the design stage in order to save weight. The A-9 was very similar to the A-8 in regards to the armament and Rüstsätze kits. A total of 910 A-9s were built between September 1944 and May 1945, mostly in Focke Wulf's Cottbus factory.

=== A-10 ===
A late-war attempt was made with the Fw 190 A-10, which was to have begun arriving in pilots' hands by March 1945 and was to be fitted with larger wings for better maneuverability at higher altitudes, which, with greater internal space, would have allowed additional 30 mm (1.18 in) caliber, long-barreled MK 103 cannon to be fitted. The A-10 was to be powered by the 801 F engine. However, due to the priority given to the Dora variant of the Fw 190 and the new Ta 152, the A-10 never made it past the prototype stage.

=== Total A-series Production ===
Across all variants, 13,291 Fw 190 A-model aircraft were produced. This total may, however, include rebuilt or modified airframes from earlier airframes. The Luftwaffe frequently changed between models on the production line, and it would not have been uncommon for an A5 variant to be converted into an A7 or A8 aircraft. This was especially true for older, battle-damaged aircraft that were upgraded to whatever current version the factory was manufacturing at the time of repair. The other complicating factor, sometimes making detailed compilation impossible is that many aircraft were assembled in field workshops where airframes and engines from aircraft withdrawn from service units were recycled.

== High-altitude developments ==
=== Limitations of A series ===
The BMW 139 (and the 801 that followed) had originally been designed as a high-power replacement for earlier engines like the BMW 132 that were used primarily on low-altitude cargo aircraft and bombers. As a result, the designers had not invested much effort in producing high performance superchargers for it.

Even before the Fw 190 A was put into service, its high-altitude performance was seen to be deficient. In contrast, the Daimler-Benz DB 601 engines used on the Bf 109 featured an advanced fluid-coupled, single stage, variable speed supercharger that provided excellent boost across a wide range of altitudes. The 190's short wings also presented a problem at higher altitudes, where they were highly loaded. As a result, the 190 could not compete with the 109 at altitudes above 6,000 m (20,000 ft), which is one reason that the 109 remained in production until the end of the war. This was not a serious concern at the time of introduction, as most combat was taking place at medium altitudes, where the 190 had ample performance.

However, as the air war reached higher altitudes with the widespread introduction of turbocharged US bombers, the need for improved performance became pressing. As a result, GM-1 Nitrous oxide boost was introduced to provide more power at altitude, but this was complex and gave boosted performance for only a short period of time.

=== High altitude improvements ===
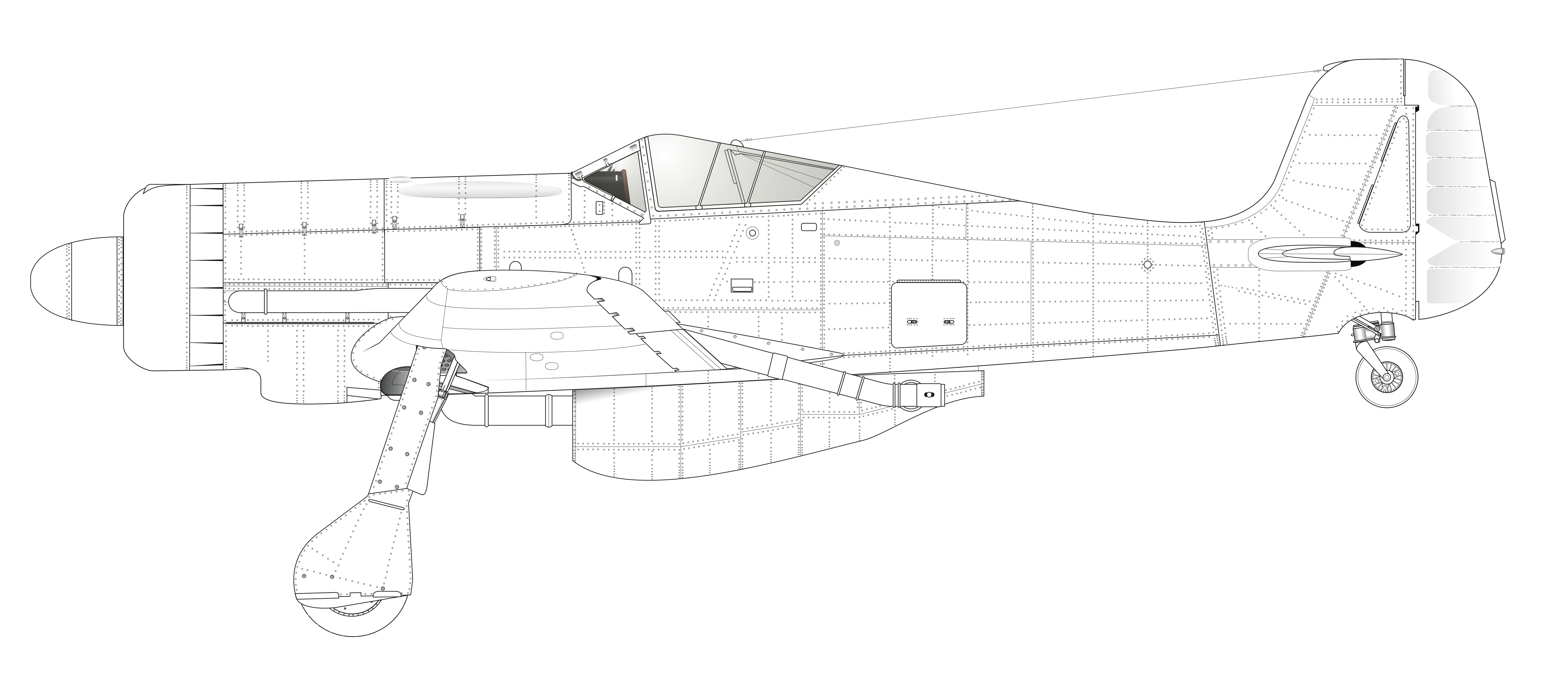
The Fw 190C V18 prototype, with large ventral "pouch" fairing for the turbocharger installation and broader-chord vertical fin/rudder.

Tank started looking at ways to address the altitude performance problem early in the program. In 1941, he proposed a number of versions featuring new powerplants, and he suggested using turbochargers in place of superchargers. Three such installations were outlined; the Fw 190 B with a turbocharged BMW 801, the Fw 190 C with a turbocharged Daimler-Benz DB 603, and the Fw 190 D with a supercharged Junkers Jumo 213. The aircraft would also include a pressurized cockpit and other features making them more suitable for high-altitude work. Prototypes for all three models were ordered.

Fw 190 V12 (an A-0) would be outfitted with many of the elements which eventually led to the B series. As it was based on the same BMW 801 engine as the A models, airframe modifications were relatively minor. These included a pressurized cockpit which doubled the panes of glass in the canopy so that hot air could be forced between them to prevent icing, and the addition of the GM-1 nitrous oxide injection system. Several problems were encountered during the machine's flight and ground trials, mostly caused by the pressurization system for the cockpit, and for this reason the first B-series testbed airframe was retired from active service in late 1942. However, trials on other aircraft continued in early 1943, when the first few Fw 190 A-1s were modified into B-series testbeds. The same aircraft used for testing the pressurized cockpits were also used to test larger wings (20.3 m^{2}/219 ft^{2} versus the standard 18.3 m^{2}/197 ft^{2} wing). This work seriously interfered with the studies on pressurized cockpits. Following these studies, one additional Fw 190 B was built, named the B-1. This aircraft was similar to the B-0, but had slightly different armament. In its initial layout, the B-1 was to be fitted with four 7.92 mm (.312 in) MG 17s and two 20 mm MG-FFs. One was fitted with two MG 17s, two 20 mm MG 151s and two 20 mm MG-FFs. After the completion of W.Nr. 811, no further Fw 190 B models were ordered.

The C model's use of the longer DB 603 engine required more extensive changes to the airframe. As the weight was distributed further forward, the tail of the aircraft had to be lengthened in order to maintain the desired center of gravity. To test these changes, several examples of otherwise standard 190 As were re-engined with a supercharged DB 603 to experiment with this engine fit, V13 (W.Nr. 0036) with the 1,750 PS 603A, the similar V15 and V16, a 1,800 DB 603 E being fitted to the latter after a time. With this engine, the V16 was able to reach 725 km/h (450 mph) at 6,800 m (22,300 ft), a considerable improvement over the 650 km/h (400 mph) at 5,200 m (17,100 ft) of the basic A models. V18 followed, the first to feature the full high-altitude suite of features, including the pressurized cockpit, longer wings, a 603G engine driving a new four-blade propeller, and a Hirth 9-2281 turbocharger. Unlike the experimental B models, V18 had a cleaner turbocharger installation, running the required piping along the wing root, partially buried in the fillet, and installing both the turbocharger air intake and intercooler in a substantially sized teardrop shaped fairing under the cockpit. This "pouch" led to the "Känguruh" (Kangaroo) nickname for these models. V18 was later modified to the V18/U1, with a "downgraded" 603A engine, but a new DVL turbocharger that improved power to 1,600 PS at an altitude of 10,700 m (35,100 ft). Four additional prototypes based on the V18/U1 followed: V29, V30, V32 and V33.

Like the C models, the early examples of the D models were built primarily to test fit the Jumo 213 engine to the existing airframe, as the D-0, with plans to move on to definitive high-altitude models later, the D-1 and D-2. The first D-0 prototype was completed in October 1942, consisting of an A-5 airframe with the Jumo 213A engine. Further examples followed, but like the C models the development was stretched out.

== Fw 190D ==
=== Fw 190D-9 ===
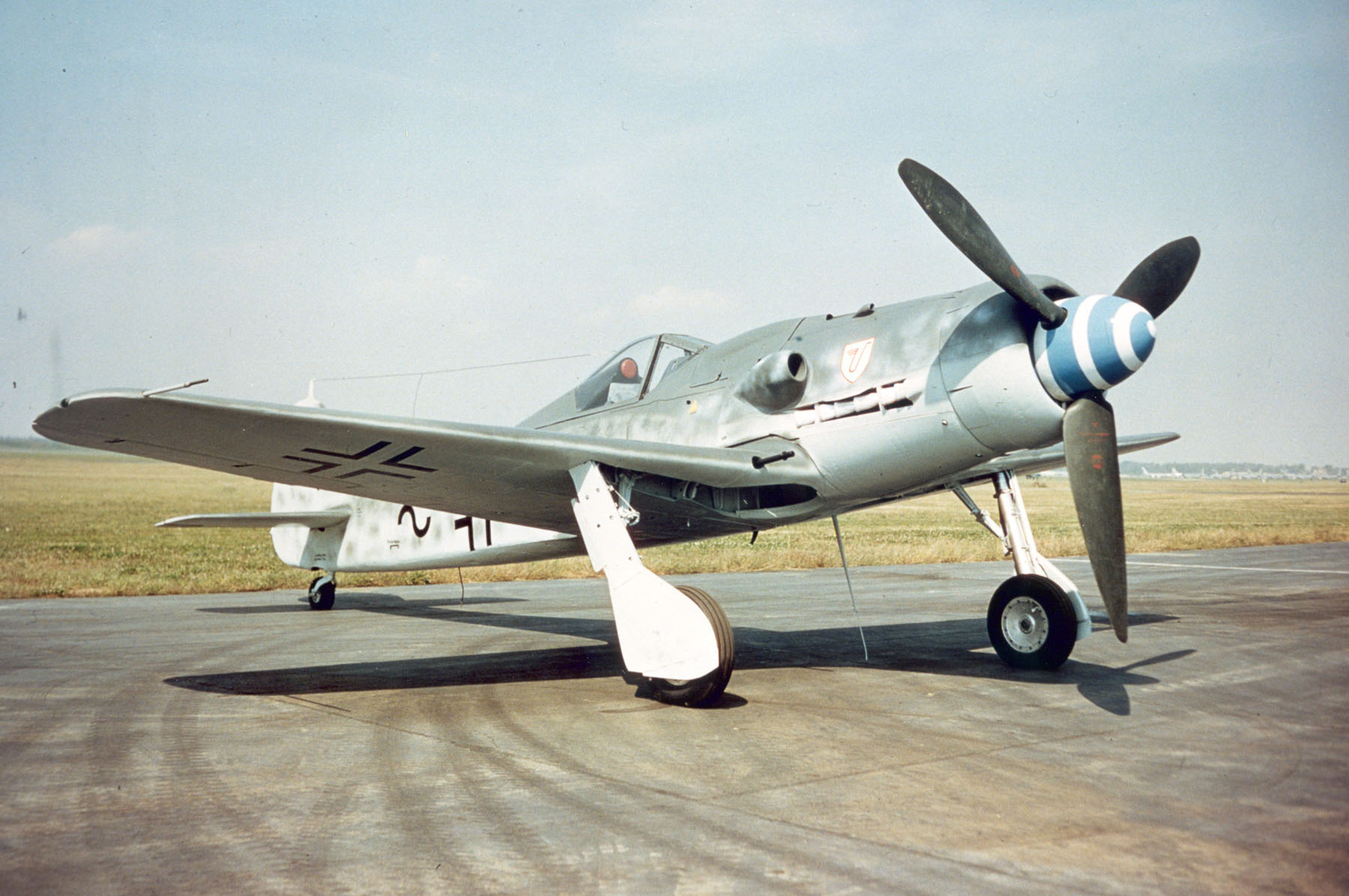
The NMUSAF's restored Fw 190D-9, in JG 3 markings.

The Fw 190 D (nicknamed the Dora; or Long-Nose Dora, "Langnasen-Dora") was intended to improve on the high-altitude performance of the A-series enough to make it useful against the American heavy bombers of the era. In the event, the D series was rarely used against the heavy-bomber raids, as the circumstances of the war in late 1944 meant that fighter-versus-fighter combat and ground attack missions took priority. A total of 1,805 D-9s were produced. Production started in August 1944.

With the D version the power plant was changed from the radial engine of earlier models to a 12-cylinder inverted-V liquid-cooled engine. The Jumo 213A generated 1,750 PS (1,730 hp; 1,290 kW), and could produce 2,100 PS (2,100 hp; 1,500 kW) of emergency power with MW 50 injection, improving performance to 686 km/h (426 mph) at 6,600 m (21,700 ft). In order to fit the new engine in the Fw 190 fuselage while maintaining proper balance, both the nose and the tail of the aircraft were lengthened, adding nearly 1.52 m (5.0 ft) to the fuselage, bringing the overall length to 10.192 m (33.44 ft) versus the 9.10 m (29.9 ft) of the late war A-9 series. The lengthened tail required a straight-sided bay, 30 cm (12 in) long, spliced in forward of the rear angled joint and tail assembly of the fuselage. To further aid balance, the pilot's oxygen bottles were moved aft and located in the new bay. This gave the rear fuselage a "stretched" appearance.

Furthermore, the move to a V12 engine from a radial engine required more components to be factored into the design, most significantly the need for coolant radiators (radial engines are air-cooled). To keep the design as simple and as aerodynamic as possible, Tank used an annular radiator (the AJA 180 L) installed at the front of the engine, similar to the configuration used in the Jumo powered versions of the Junkers Ju 88. The annular radiator with its adjustable cooling gills resembled a radial engine installation, although the row of six short exhausts stacks on either side of the elongated engine cowling showed that the Jumo 213 was an inverted V12 engine. While the first few Doras were fitted with the flat-top canopy, these were later replaced with the newer rounded top "blown" canopy first used on the A-8 model. With the canopy changes, the shoulder and head armor plating design was also changed. Some late model Doras were also fitted with the broader-chord Ta 152 vertical stabilizer and rudder, often called "Big Tails" by the Luftwaffe ground crews and pilots, as seen on W.Nr. 500647 Brown 4 from 7./JG 26 and W.Nr. 500645 Black 6 from JG 2. The centerline weapons rack was changed to an ETC 504 with a simplified and much smaller mounting and fairing.

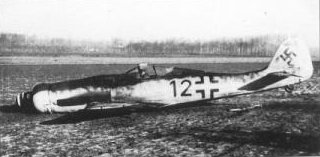
A Fw 190D-9 of 10./JG 54 Grünherz, pilot (Leutnant Theo Nibel), downed by a bird which flew into the nose radiator near Brussels on 1 January 1945.

Early D-9s reached service without the MW 50 installation, but in the meantime Junkers produced a kit to increase manifold pressure (Ladedrucksteigerungs-Rüstsatz) that increased engine output by 150 PS to 1,900 PS, and was effective up to 5,000 m (16,000 ft) altitude. It was fitted immediately to D-9s delivered to the units from September, or retrofitted in the field by TAM. By the end of December, all operational Doras, 183 in total, were converted. From November 1944, a simplified methanol water (MW 50) system (Oldenburg) was fitted, which boosted output to 2,100 PS. By the end of 1944, 60 were delivered with the simplified MW 50 system or were at the point of entering service. The 115 liter (30.4 US gal) tank of the Oldenburg system would hold the MW 50 booster liquid, which was single purpose, while later systems were to be dual purpose, holding either MW 50 or additional fuel.

The fighter lacked the higher rate of roll of its close coupled radial-engined predecessor. However, it was faster, with a maximum speed of 680 km/h (420 mph) at 6,600 meters (21,700 feet). Its 2,240 horsepower with methanol-water injection (MW 50) gave it an excellent acceleration in combat situations. It also climbed and dived more rapidly than the Fw 190A, and so proved well suited to the dive-and-zoom ambush tactics favored by the Schlageter fighter wing's pilots from November 1944 onward, when the wing converted to the Fw 190D. Many of the early models were not equipped with methanol tanks for the MW 50 boost system, which was in very short supply in any event. At low altitude, the top speed and acceleration of these examples were inferior to those of Allied fighters. Hans Hartigs recalled that only one of the first batch of Dora 9s received by the First Gruppe had methanol water injection, and the rest had a top speed of only 590 km/h (370 mph).

Owing to the failure of multiple attempts to create an effective next-generation 190, as well as the comments of some Luftwaffe pilots, expectations of the Dora project were low. These impressions were not helped by the fact that Tank made it very clear that he intended the D-9 to be a stopgap until the Ta 152 arrived. These negative opinions existed for some time until positive pilot feedback began arriving at Focke-Wulf and the Luftwaffe command structure. Sporting good handling and performance characteristics, the D-9 made an effective medium altitude, high speed interceptor, although its performance still fell away at altitudes above about 6,000 m (20,000 ft). When flown by capable pilots, the Fw 190D proved the equal of Allied types.

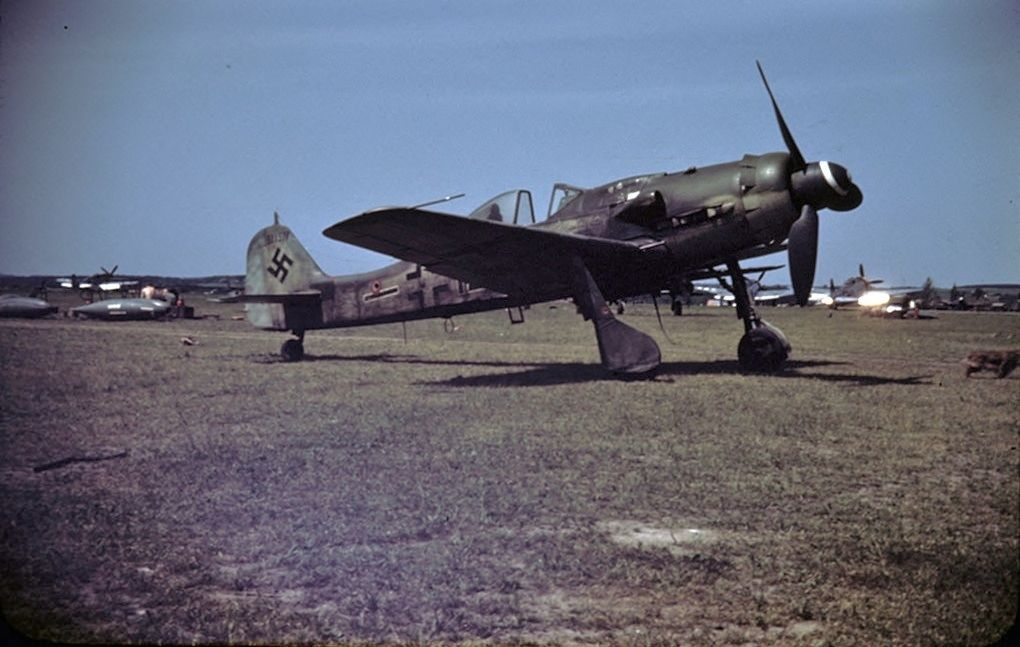
This captured Fw 190 D-9 appears to be a late production aircraft built by Fieseler at Kassel. It has a late style canopy; the horizontal black stripe with white outline shows that this was a II.Gruppe aircraft.

As it was used in the anti-fighter role, armament in the "D" was generally lighter compared to that of the earlier aircraft—usually the outer wing cannon were omitted so that the armament consisted of two 13 mm (0.51 in) cowling-mounted MG 131s, with 400 rounds per gun, and two wing root mounted 20 mm MG 151/20E cannon with 250 rounds per gun; all four weapons were synchronized to fire through the propeller arc. The wings of the D-9 still had the electrical circuits and attachment points for the underwing BR 21 rocket propelled mortar, although none appeared to have used these operationally. While inferior to the A-series in roll rate, the "D" was superior in turn rate, climb, dive and horizontal speed. The Dora still featured the same wing as the A-8, however, and was capable of carrying outer wing cannon as well, as demonstrated by the D-11 variant, with a three-stage supercharger and four wing cannon (two MG 151s and two MK 108s). The first Fw 190 D-9s started entering service in September 1944, with III./JG 54. It was quickly followed by other units including I./JG 26 which flew its last operations on the A-8s on 19 November 1944.

Some Fw 190 Ds served as fighter cover for Messerschmitt Me 262 airfields, as the jet fighters were very vulnerable on take-off and landing. These special units were known as Platzsicherungstaffel (airfield security squadrons). One unit, known as the Würger-Staffel, was created in April 1945 by Lieutenant Heinz Sachsenberg at the behest of Adolf Galland, and was part of JV 44. The role of the Staffel was to guard the airfield and JV 44's Me 262s as they landed; as such the Fw 190s were supposed to take off before the jets and circle the airfield in pairs (a Rotte). However, to allow the 262s a clear run back to the airfield the 190s had to land before the jets, negating their protection. To help anti-aircraft artillery protecting the airfields to quickly identify friendly aircraft, the under-surfaces of the Würger-Staffel 190s were painted red with narrow white stripes. leading to the alternative nickname of Papageien Staffel (parrot squadron) from the bright red color.

=== Specifications (Fw 190 D-9) ===
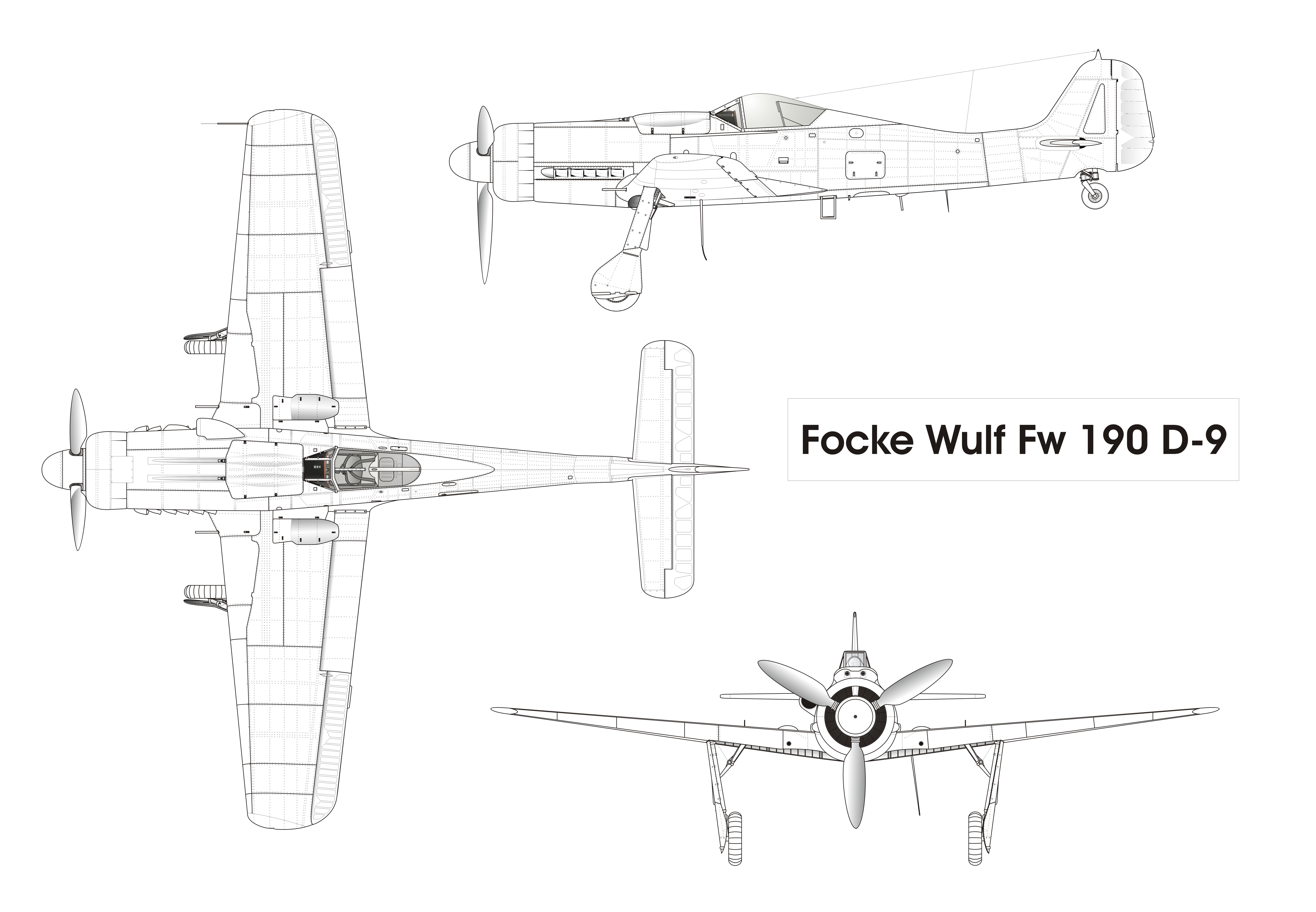
Orthographically projected diagram of the Fw 190 D-9

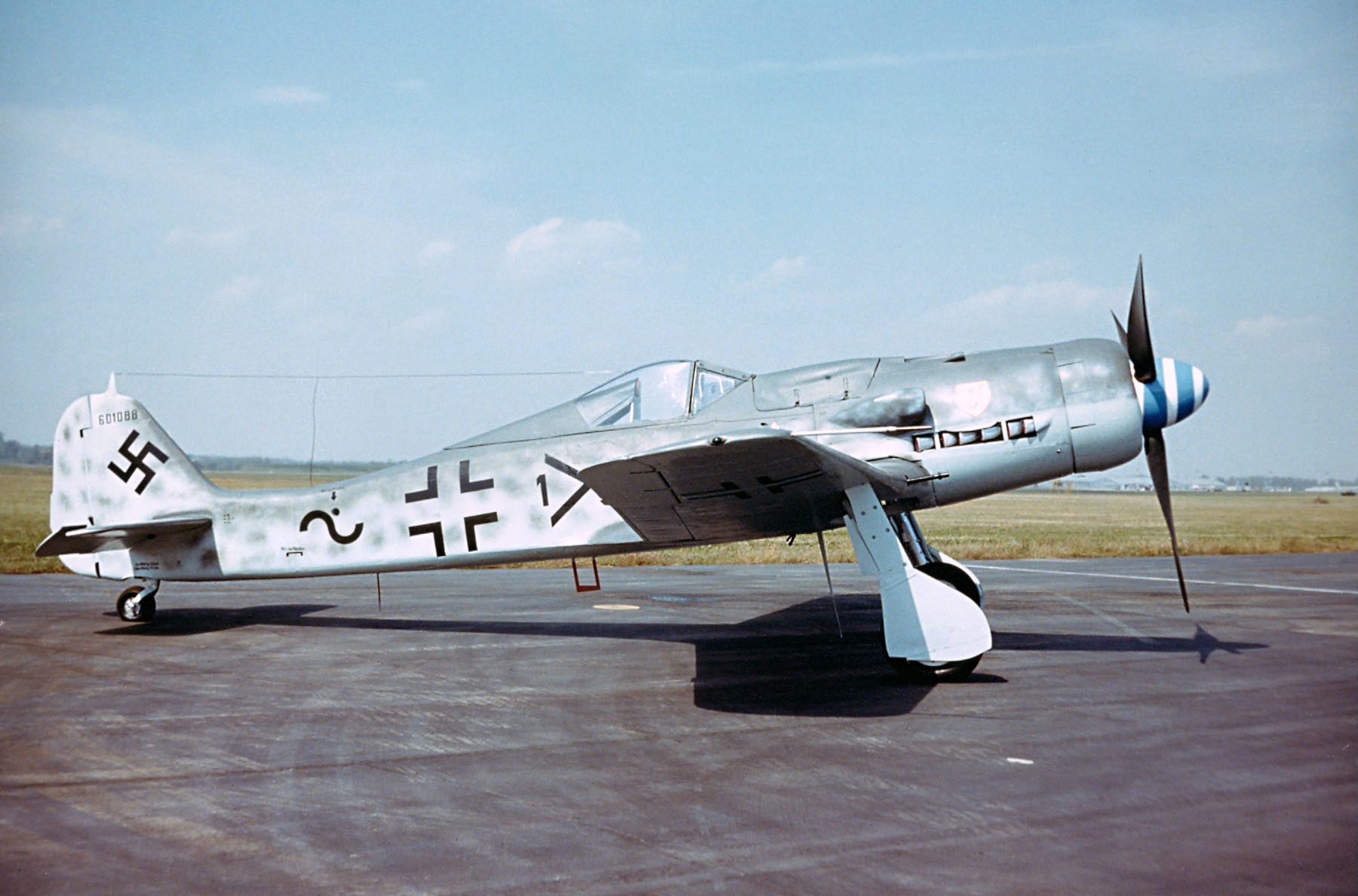
A side view of the NMUSAF's D-9. One can easily distinguish the D-9 model from earlier variants by the extended nose and tail sections, in addition to the exhaust manifolds located near the base of the engine cowling.

Data from

General characteristics

- Crew: 1
- Length: 10.2 m (33 ft 6 in)
- Wingspan: 10.5 m (34 ft 5 in)
- Height: 3.35 m (11 ft 0 in)
- Wing area: 18.3 m^{2} (197 sq ft)
- Airfoil: root: NACA 23015.3; tip: NACA 23009
- Empty weight: 3,490 kg (7,694 lb)
- Gross weight: 4,270 kg (9,414 lb)
- Max takeoff weight: 4,840 kg (10,670 lb)
- Powerplant: 1 × Junkers Jumo 213A V-12 inverted liquid-cooled piston engine 1,750 PS (1,726 hp; 1,287 kW)

2,050 PS (2,022 hp; 1,508 kW)with MW 50 injection

- Propellers: 3-bladed constant-speed propeller

Performance

- Maximum speed: 685 km/h (426 mph, 370 kn) at 6,600 m (21,700 ft)

710 km/h (440 mph; 380 kn) at 11,000 m (36,000 ft)

- Range: 835 km (519 mi, 451 nmi)
- Service ceiling: 12,000 m (39,000 ft)
- Rate of climb: 17 m/s (3,300 ft/min)
- Wing loading: 233 kg/m^{2} (48 lb/sq ft)
- Power/mass: 0.30–0.35 kW/kg (0.18–0.21 hp/lb)

Armament

- Guns: (all synchronized to fire through propeller arc)
  - 2 × 13 mm (0.512 in) MG 131 machine guns with 475 rpg
  - 2 × 20 mm (0.787 in) MG 151 cannon with 250 rpg in the wing roots
- Bombs: 1 × 500 kg (1,102 lb) SC 500 bomb (optional)

=== Fw 190 D-11 ===
17 Fw 190 D-11s were known to have been manufactured. This version was fitted with the updated Jumo 213F series engine similar to the Jumo 213E used in the Ta-152 H series but minus the intercooler. Visible changes over the D-9 were the enlarged supercharger air intake on the starboard side cowling and the use of a wooden, broad-bladed VS 9 or 10 propeller unit utilizing three 9-27012 C-1 blades with a diameter of 3.6 m (11.8 ft). The 13 mm (.51 in) fuselage guns were removed, and the cowling redesigned by omitting the gun troughs and simplifying to a flat profile. Two 30 mm (1.18 in) MK 108 cannons were installed in the outer wings to complement the 20 mm MG 151s in the inboard positions. Of the 17 Dora-11s delivered, three can be accounted for. One, the best known, was Rote 4 (red 4) of JV 44's Platzschutz unit. Another, white chevron, was found at München-Riem, and may have served with JV 44 after serving at the Verbandsführerschule General der Jagdflieger (Training School for Unit Leaders) at Bad Wörishofen; it is not known if it was actually used operationally. A third, "white <61," was also found after the war at the Verbandsfuehrerschule General der Jagdflieger.

=== Fw 190 D-12 ===
While the D-11 was under manufacture, work started on the Fw 190 D-12 and D-13 models. These were similar to the D-11, but featured a Motorkanone nose cannon firing through the propeller hub. The D-12 had the 30 mm (1.18 in) MK 108 cannon, while the D-13 was fitted with a 20 mm MG 151/20 cannon. There were three D-12 test aircraft built: V63, V64 and V65, but no production aircraft were built with the D-13 selected for production instead.

=== Fw 190 D-13 ===
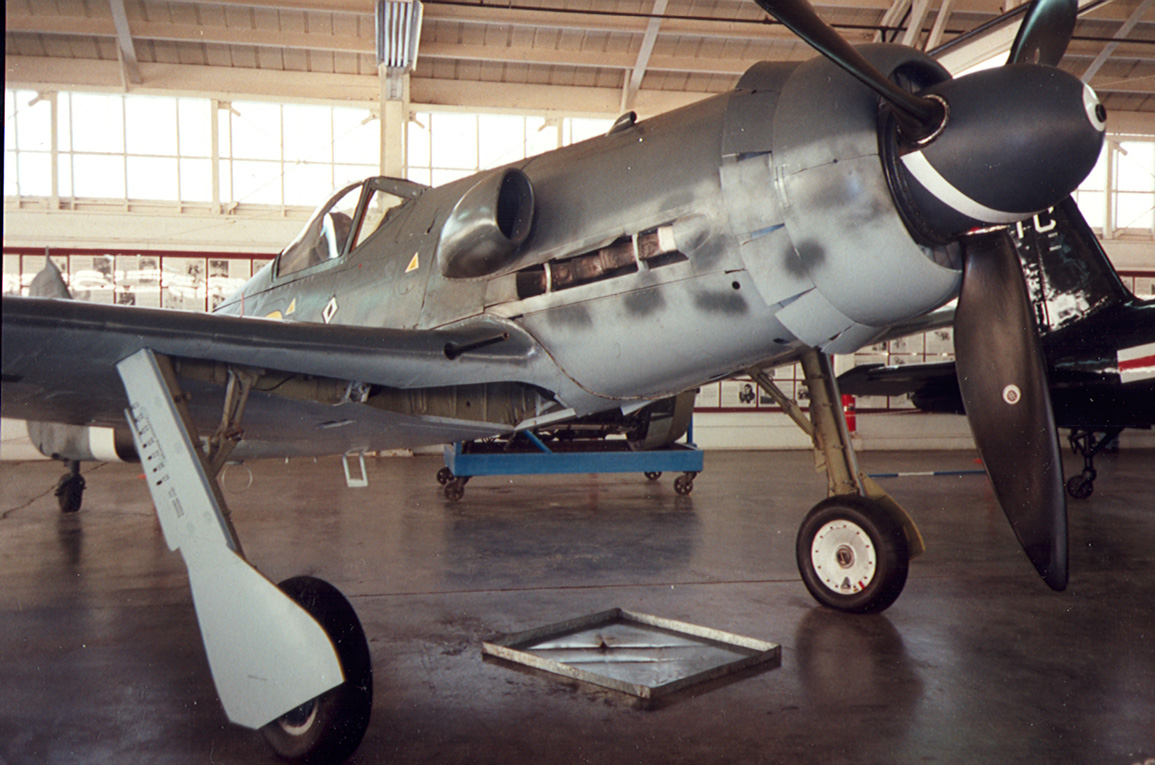
Fw 190 D-13/R11, Champlin Fighter Museum, Phoenix, Arizona (c.1995). The aircraft currently resides at Flying Heritage & Combat Armor Museum.

The Fw 190 D-13 started with the construction of two prototypes (W.Nr 732053 and W.Nr 7322054), and the 20 mm MG 151/20 cannon was found to be quite suited for the aircraft and was already well known to be effective against allied bombers, as well as an effective ground support weapon. Thus the Fw 190 D-13/Rüstsatz 11 (/R11) version was selected to enter production. The D-13/R11 was fitted with all-weather flying equipment including the PKS12 and K-23 systems for steering and autopilot. The FuG 125 radio system, known as Hermine was fitted to the aircraft, as well as a heated windscreen. Pilots reported that due to the large amounts of torque produced by the engine, they usually used the steering system during the takeoff run as it helped with the rudder movements. The D-13 also introduced a hydraulic boost system for the ailerons, which was later used on the Ta 152.

One example of the D-13 version still exists today in the markings of "Yellow 10" of 6 Staffel/JG 26, and it has been restored to an airworthy condition in the United States. However, it will not be flown because it is the only remaining D-13. The aircraft is on display at the Flying Heritage & Combat Armor Museum.

=== D-series production ===
In all, the Ministry of Aviation called for 820 D-11 airframes to be built by Focke-Wulf Sorau, starting in early 1945, Fieseler Kassel was tasked to build 1,420 D-12s starting in the same time frame and the manufacture of the D-13 was passed to Arbeitsgruppe Roland (Note: Roland was a name used by Luft-Fahrzeug-Gesellschaft for its First World War aircraft.) tasked with the construction of 1,060 airframes starting again in early 1945. For some unknown reason, production of the D-12 was cancelled in favor of the D-13 model. From evidence from the Oberkommando der Luftwaffe General Quartiermeister document Nr. 2766/45 of April 1945, it was known that 17 D-13s were more than likely built, but only two were known to be in service. A D-13 (Wk. Nr 836017) flown by the Geschwaderkommodore of JG 26, Franz Götz, an ace with 63 kills, was surrendered to the British at Flensburg, Northern Germany in May 1945. As noted previously, this aircraft is still in existence, painted in its original color scheme as Yellow 10 of 6 Staffel/JG 26, is thought to be airworthy and is currently located in the Flying Heritage Collection at Paine Field in Everett, Washington. This aircraft is one of the few existing Fw 190s with a provenance that can be traced continuously from its manufacture to the present time.

== Ground attack variants ==
=== Fw 190 F ===
The Fw 190F configuration was originally tested in a Fw 190 A-0/U4, starting in May 1942. The A-0 testbed aircraft was outfitted with centerline and wing-mounted bomb racks. The early testing results were quite good, and Focke-Wulf began engineering the attack version of the Fw 190. New armor was added to the bottom of the fuselage, protecting the fuel tanks and pilot, the engine cowling, and the landing gear mechanisms and outer wing mounted armament. This attack configuration with additional armor and an ETC 501 centerline bomb rack was officially designated Umrüst-Bausatz kit 3 (abbreviated as /U3). It was first used on the A-4, the 18 known A-4/U3 were later redesignated Fw 190 F-1. The Fw 190 F-2s were renamed Fw 190 A-5/U3s, of which 270 were built according to Focke-Wulf production logs and Ministry of Aviation acceptance reports.

The Fw 190 F-3 was based on the Fw 190 A-5/U17, which was outfitted with a centerline mounted ETC 501 bomb rack, and in the Fw 190 F-3/R1, with two ETC 50 bomb racks under each wing. The F-3 could carry an 80 US gal (300 L) standard Luftwaffe drop tank. A total of 432 Fw 190 F-3s were built.

The Fw 190 F-4 to F-7 designations were used for some projects, two of them made it into production and were renamed into F-8/F-9 to unify the subversion with the A-series airframe they were based on.

The Fw 190 F-8 differed from the A-8 model in having a slightly modified injector on the compressor which allowed for increased performance at lower altitudes for several minutes. The F-8 was also fitted with the improved FuG 16 ZS radio unit, which provided much better communication with ground combat units. Armament of the Fw 190 F-8 was two 20 mm MG 151/20 cannon in the wing roots and two 13 mm (.51 in) MG 131 machine guns above the engine. In the Fw 190 F-8/R1 two ETC 50 bomb racks were installed under each wing, capable of holding one 50 kg bomb each. In 1945 the ETC 50 was replaced with the ETC 70, capable of holding 70 kg bombs. According to Ministry of Aviation acceptance reports, at least 3,400 F-8s were built, and probably several hundred more were built in December 1944 and from February to May 1945. (Data for these months is missing and probably lost.) Dozens of F-8s served as various testbeds for anti-tank armament, including the WGr.28 280 mm air-to-ground missile, probably based on the projectiles from the Nbw 41 heavy ground-barrage rocket system, and the 88 mm (3.5 in) Panzerschreck 2 rockets, Panzerblitz 1 and R4M rockets.

There were also several Umrüst-Bausätze kits developed for the F-8, which included the Fw 190 F-8/U1 long range JaBo, fitted with underwing V.Mtt-Schloß shackles to hold two 300 L (80 US gal) fuel tanks. ETC 503 bomb racks were also fitted, allowing the Fw 190 F-8/U1 to carry one SC 250 bomb under each wing and one SC 250 bomb on the centerline.

Fw 190 F
The Fw 190F configuration was originally tested in a Fw 190 A-0/U4, starting in May 1942, fitted with centre-line and wing-mounted bomb racks.

Fw 190 F-1
Renamed A-4/U3s of which 18 were built

Fw 190 F-2
Renamed A-5/U3s, of which 270 were built according to Focke-Wulf production logs and Ministry of Aviation acceptance reports.

Fw 190 F-3
Developed under the designation Fw 190 A-5/U17, which was outfitted with a centreline mounted ETC 501 bomb rack. The Fw 190 F-3/R1 it had two additional ETC 50 bomb racks under each wing. The F-3 could carry a 66-Imp gal (300 L) drop tank. A total of 432 Fw 190 F-3s were built.

Fw 190 F-4 to F-7
designations used for projects.

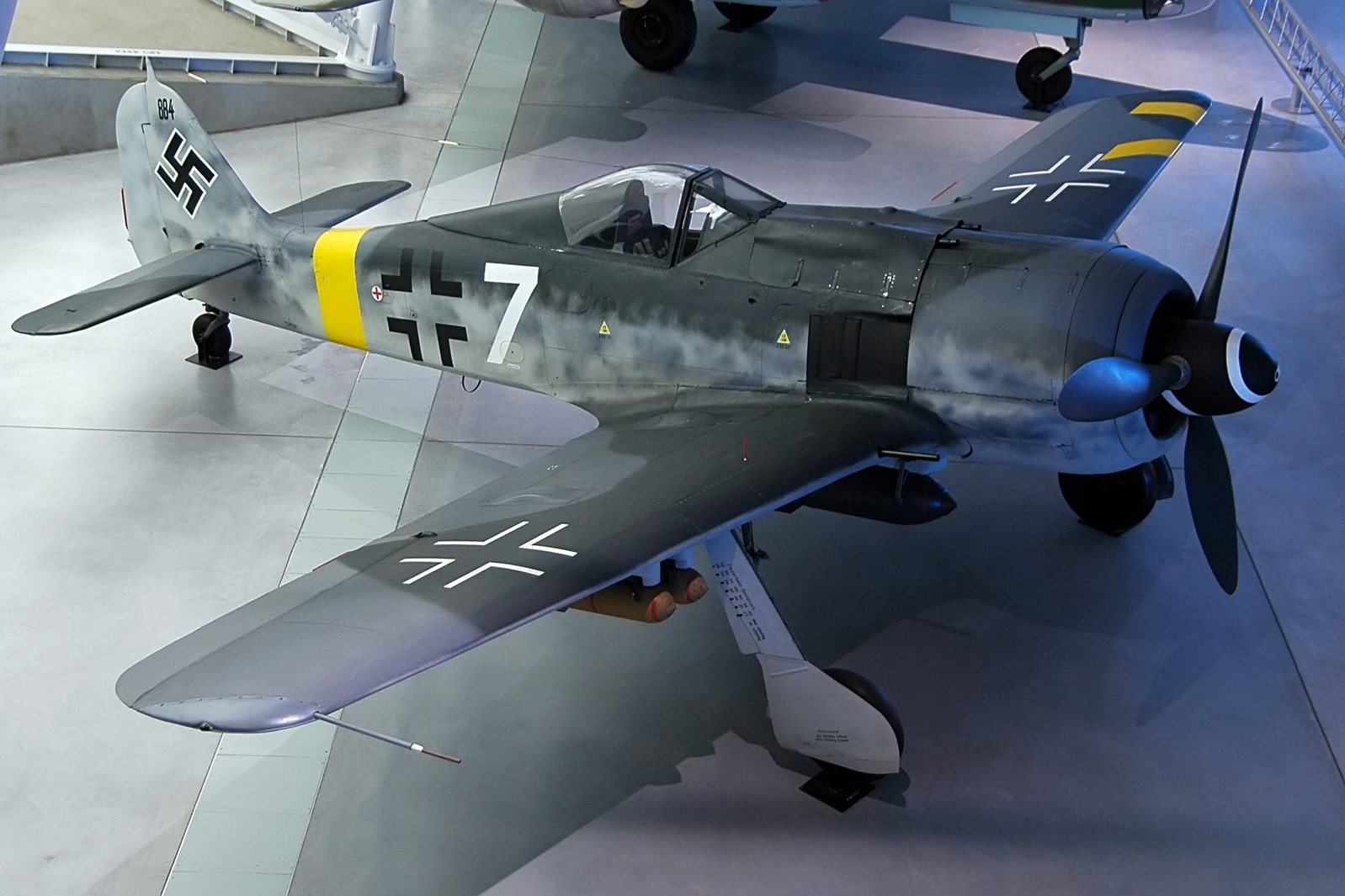
The National Air & Space Museum's restored Fw 190 F-8 in late war, "low-visibility" Balkenkreuz markings

Fw 190 F-8
Based on the A-8 Fighter, having a slightly modified injector on the compressor which allowed for increased performance at lower altitudes for several minutes. Armament of the Fw 190 F-8 was two 20 mm MG 151/20 cannon in the wing roots and two 13 mm (.51 in) MG 131 machine guns above the engine. It was outfited with an ETC 501 Bomb rack as centerline mount and four ETC 50 bomb racks as underwing mounts.

Fw 190 F-8/U1 — long range JaBo, fitted with underwing V.Mtt-Schloß shackles to hold two of the Luftwaffe's standardized 300 L (80 US gal) drop tanks. ETC 503 bomb racks were also fitted, allowing the Fw 190 F-8/U1 to carry one SC 250 bomb under each wing and one SC 250 bomb on the centreline.

Fw 190 F-8/U2 — prototype torpedo bomber, fitted with an ETC 503 bomb rack under each wing and a centre-line mounted ETC 504. The U2 was also equipped with the TSA 2 A weapons sighting system that improved the U2's ability to attack seaborne targets with a 700 kg (1,500 lb) BT 700.

Fw 190 F-8/U3 — heavy torpedo bomber was outfitted with an ETC 502, which allowed it to carry one BT-1400 heavy torpedo (1,400 kg (3,100 lb)). Owing to the size of the torpedo, the U3's tail gear needed to be lengthened. The U3 also was fitted with the 2,000 PS BMW 801S engine, and the tail from the Ta 152.

Fw 190 F-8/U4 — created as a night bomber, was equipped with flame dampers on the exhaust and various electrical systems such as the FuG 101 radio altimeter, the PKS 12 automatic pilot, and the TSA 2 A sighting system. The U4 was fitted with only two MG 151/20 cannon as fixed armament.

Fw 190 F-8/R3 — project with two underwing mounted 30mm MK 103 cannon.

Fw 190 F-9 - based on the Fw 190 A-9, but with the new Ta 152 tail unit, a new bulged canopy as fitted to late-build A-9s, and four ETC 50 or ETC 70 bomb racks under the wings. According to Ministry of Aviation acceptance reports, 147 F-9s were built in January 1945, and perhaps several hundred more from February to May 1945. (Data for these months is missing and probably lost.)

=== Fw 190 G ===
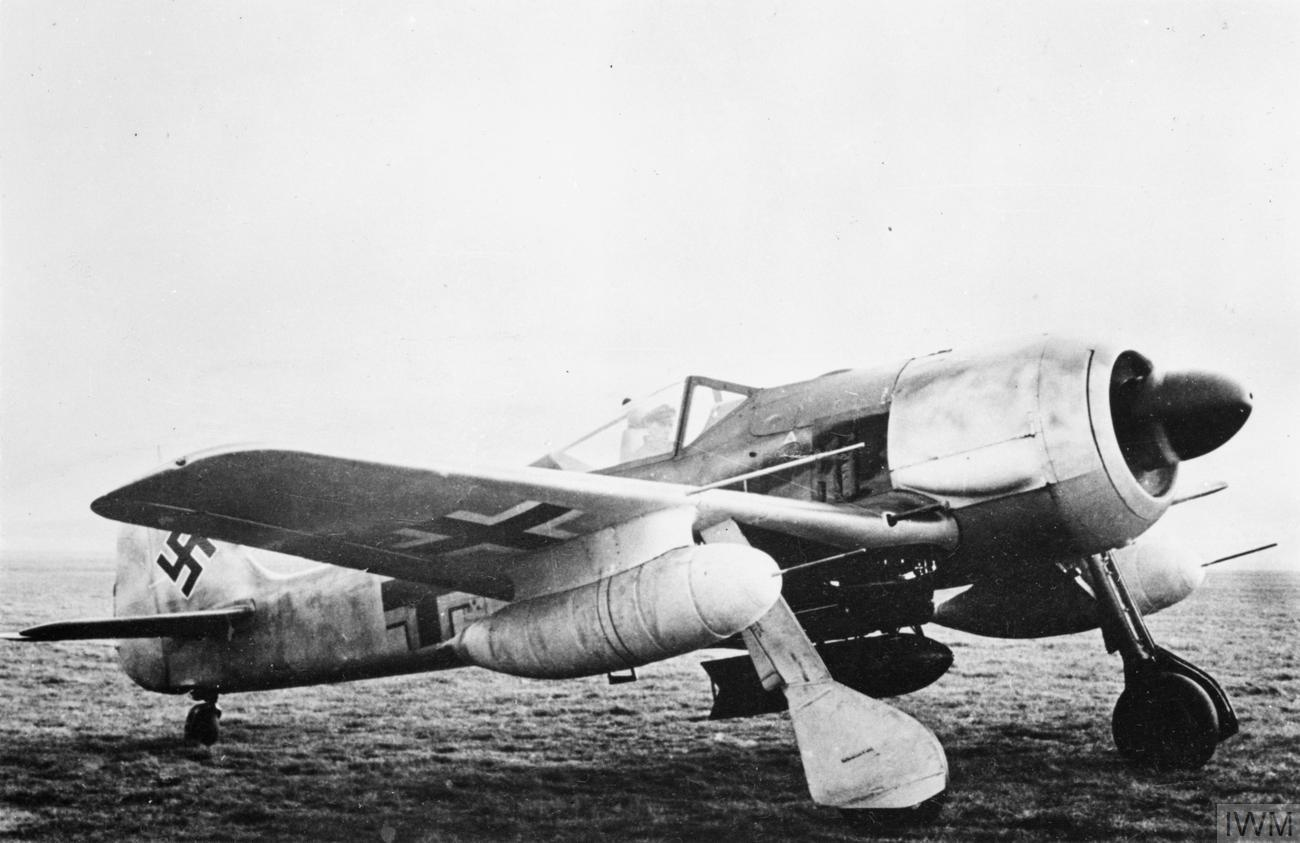
Fw 190 G-1 showing the ETC 250 bomb rack, carrying a 250 kg (550 lb) bomb, and the underwing drop tanks on VTr-Ju 87 mounts.

The Fw 190 G was built as a long-range attack aircraft (Jagdbomber mit vergrösserter Reichweite - abbreviated JaBo Rei). Following the success of the Fw 190 F as a Schlachtflugzeug (close support aircraft), both the Luftwaffe and Focke-Wulf began investigating ways of extending the range of the Fw 190 F. From these needs and tests, the Fw 190 G was born.

There were four distinct versions of the Fw 190 G:

The Fw 190 G-1: The first Fw 190 Gs were based on the Fw 190 A-4/U8 JaBo Rei's. Initial testing found that if all but two wing root mounted 20 mm MG 151 cannons (with reduced ammunition load) were removed, the Fw 190 G-1 (as it was now called) could carry a 250 or 500 kg (550 or 1,100 lb) bomb on the centerline and, via an ETC 250 rack, up to a 250 kg (550 lb) bomb under each wing. Typically the G-1s flew with underwing fuel tanks, fitted via the VTr-Ju 87 rack. The FuG 25a IFF (identification friend/foe) was fitted on occasion as well as one of the various radio direction finders available at the time. With the removal of the fuselage mounted MG 17s, an additional oil tank was added to support the BMW 801 D-2 engine's longer run times.

The Fw 190 G-2: The G-2 was based on the Fw 190 A-5/U8 aircraft. The G-2s were similarly equipped to the G-1s; however, due to wartime conditions, the underwing drop tank racks were replaced with the much simpler V.Mtt-Schloß fittings, to allow for a number of underwing configurations. Some G-2s were also fitted with the additional oil tank in place of the MG 17s; however, not all were outfitted with the oil tank. Some G-2s were fitted with exhaust dampers and landing lights in the left wing leading edge for night operations.

The Fw 190 G-3: The G-3 was based on Fw 190 A-6. Like the earlier G models, all but the two wing root mounted MG 151 cannons were removed. The new V.Fw. Trg bomb racks, however, allowed the G-3 to simultaneously carry fuel tanks and bomb loads. Because of the range added by two additional fuel tanks, the G-3's duration increased to two hours, 30 minutes. Due to this extra flight duration, a PKS 11 autopilot was fitted. Some G-3s built in late 1943 were also fitted with the a modified 801 D-2 engine which allowed for increased low-altitude performance for short periods of time. The G-3 had two primary Rüstsätze kits. The R1 replaced the V.Fw. Trg racks with WB 151/20 cannon pods. This gave the G-3/R1 a total of six 20 mm cannon. When fitted with the R1 kit, the G model's addition armor was typically not used, and the PKS11 removed. The G-3/R1 was used in both ground strafing and anti-bomber roles. The R5 was similar to the R1, but the V.Fw. Trg racks were removed, and two ETC 50 racks per wing were added. As with the R1, the additional armor from the base G model were removed, as was the additional oil tank. In some instances, the fuselage mounted MG 17s were refitted.

Fw 190 G-3/R1 — The G-3/R1 replaced the V.Fw. Trg racks with a pair of Waffen-Behälter WB 151/20 conformal cannon pods; each mounting a pair of Mauser MG 151/20 autocannon, giving the G-3/R1 - with its existing pair of wing-root mounted, synchronized MG 151/20 autocannon, a total of six such ordnance pieces.

Fw 190 G-3/R5 — The G-3/R5 was similar to the R1, but the V.Fw. Trg racks were removed, and two ETC 50 racks per wing were added.

Fw 190 G-8
The G-8 was based on the Fw 190 A-8, using the same "bubble" canopy as the F-8 and fitted with underwing ETC 503 racks that could carry either bombs or drop tanks.

Fw 190 G-8/R4 — The G-8/R4 kit was a planned refit for the GM 1 engine boost system, but never made it into production.

Fw 190 G-8/R5 — The G-8/R5 kit replaced the ETC 503 racks with two ETC 50 or 71 racks.

The Fw 190 G-8: The G-8 was based on the Fw 190 A-8. The G-8 used the same "bubble" canopy as the F-8, and was fitted with underwing ETC 503 racks that could carry either bombs or drop tanks. Two primary Rüstsätze kits were also seen on the F-8. The R4 kit was a planned refit for the GM 1 engine boost system, but never made it into production, and the R5 kit replaced the ETC 503 racks with two ETC 50 or 71 racks. Due to the similarities with the F-8, the G-8 was only in production for a short amount of time. Some Gs were field modified to carry 1,000 kg (2,200 lb), 1,600 kg (3,500 lb) and 1,800 kg (3,970 b) bombs. When this was done, the landing gear was slightly improved by enhancing the oleo struts and using reinforced tires.

Approximately 1,300 Fw 190 Gs of all variants were new built. Due to war conditions, the manufacturing environment, and the use of special workshops during the later years of the war, the actual number of G models built is almost impossible to determine. During the later years of the war, "composite" aircraft were often assembled. For example, the wings from a fuselage damaged aircraft and the fuselage from a wing damaged aircraft might be reassembled into a new aircraft and listed as a Fw 190G with a new serial number. The Fw 190 F-8 currently displayed at the National Air and Space Museum is one of these "composite" aircraft, built from the fuselage of a Fw 190 A-7.

== Trainer versions ==
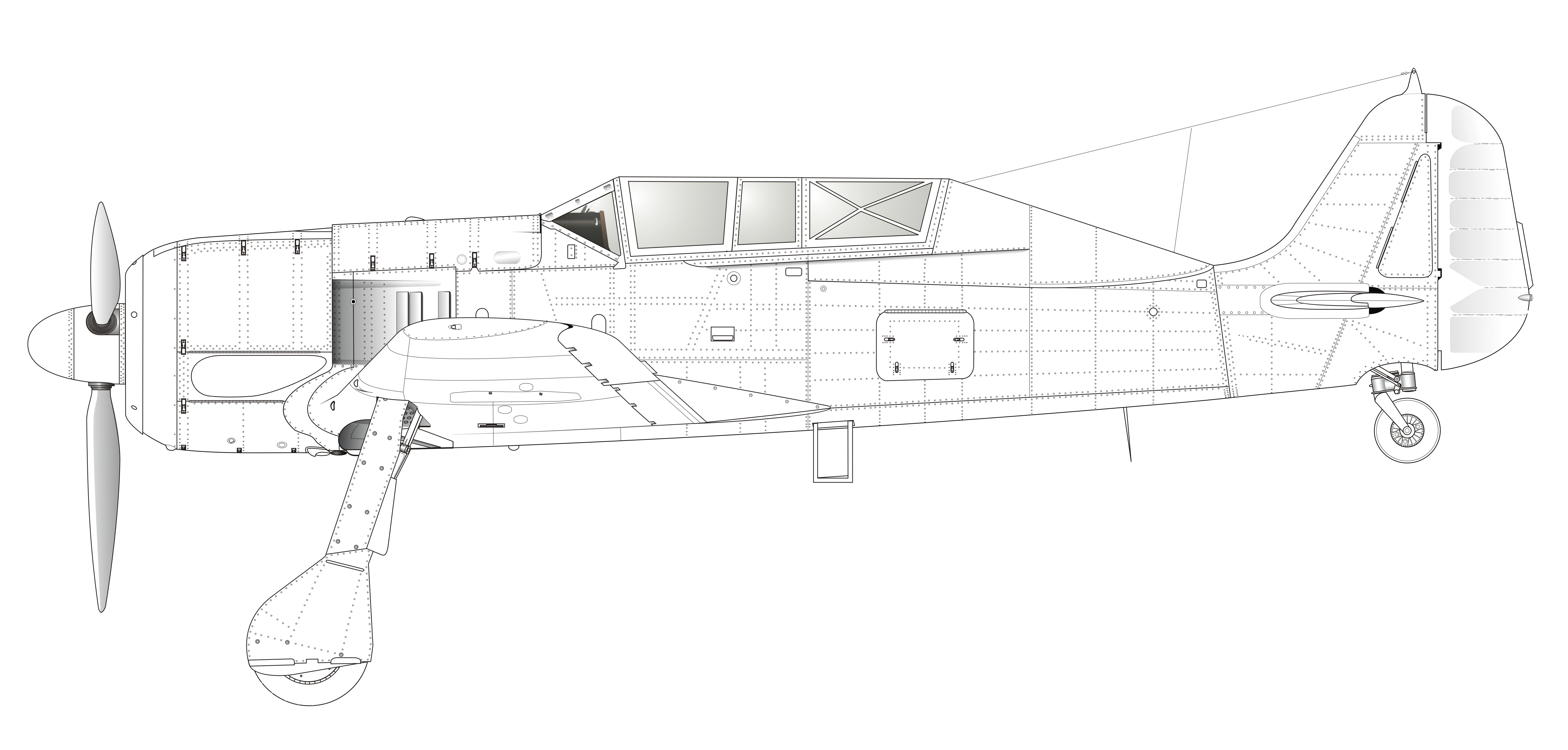
Fw 190 S-5 side view, showing the rear cockpit and extended canopy structure.

As the Luftwaffe phased out older aircraft such as the Ju 87 in favor of the Fw 190, many pilots required flight training to make the transition as quick and smooth as possible. Thus was born the Schulflugzeug (literally "school airplane") training version of the Fw 190. Several old Fw 190 A-5s, and later in 1944 A-8s, were converted by replacing the MW 50 tank with a second cockpit. The canopy was modified, replaced with a new three-section unit that opened to the side, similar to the Bf 109, which had its own G-12 two-seat training variant. The rear portion of the fuselage was closed off with sheet metal. Originally designated Fw 190 A-8/U1 (as an Umrüst-Bausatz factory modification), they were later designated Fw 190 S-5 and S-8. An estimated 58 Fw 190 S-5 and S-8 models were converted or built.

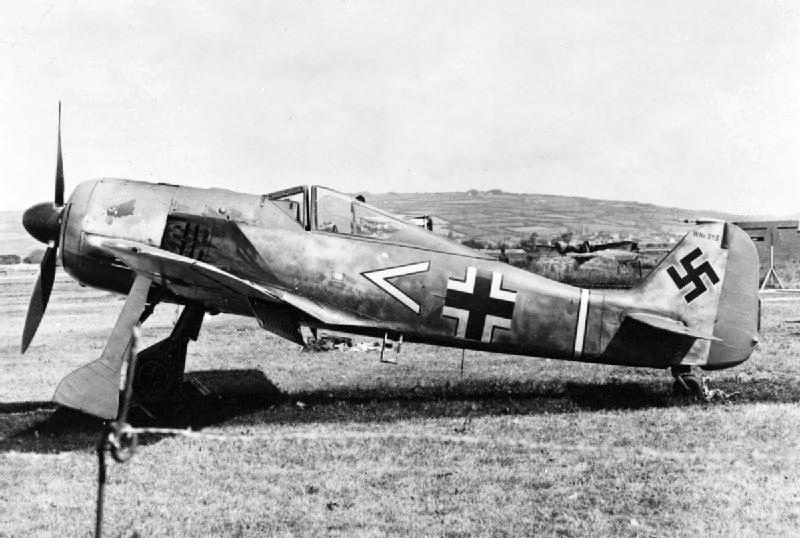
Fw 190A-3 of Stab. 7./JG2, June 1942. (Note: This A-3 was landed by mistake by Oblt Armin Faber at RAF Pembrey on 23 June 1942, becoming the first Fw 190 to be captured and tested by the RAF.)

== See also ==
Related development

- Focke-Wulf Ta 152

Aircraft of comparable role, configuration, and era

- IAR 80
- Kawasaki Ki-100
- Lavochkin La-5
- Lavochkin La-7
- Nakajima Ki-84
- Polikarpov I-185
- Republic P-47 Thunderbolt
- Vought F4U Corsair
- Grumman F8F Bearcat

Related lists

- List of aircraft of World War II
