= Rüstsatz =

Rüstsätze were field modification kits produced for the German Luftwaffe during the Second World War. They were packaged in kit form, usually direct from the aircraft manufacturer, and allowed for field modifications of various German aircraft used in World War II, predominantly fighter bombers and night fighters. Rüstsätze kits could be fitted in the field, as opposed to Umrüst-Bausätze kits, which were typically fitted in the factory. This was not a hard and fast rule, however; during production runs various Rüstsätze kits were often fitted by factories in order to meet Luftwaffe demands, and "/R" designations were also occasionally applied to more complex changes in an aircraft's airframe design that were much more suitably completed at production line facilities, as with a few of the "/R"-designated versions of the He 177A-5 heavy bomber.

== Variants ==
Typical Rüstsätze kits would include extra cannon or machine gun armament, most often mounted in underwing gun pods, bomb and drop tank fittings, extra armor, fuel, and various electrical system upgrades. The kits were numbered R1, R2, R3 and so forth. Some of these upgrades would become almost standard on certain fighters.

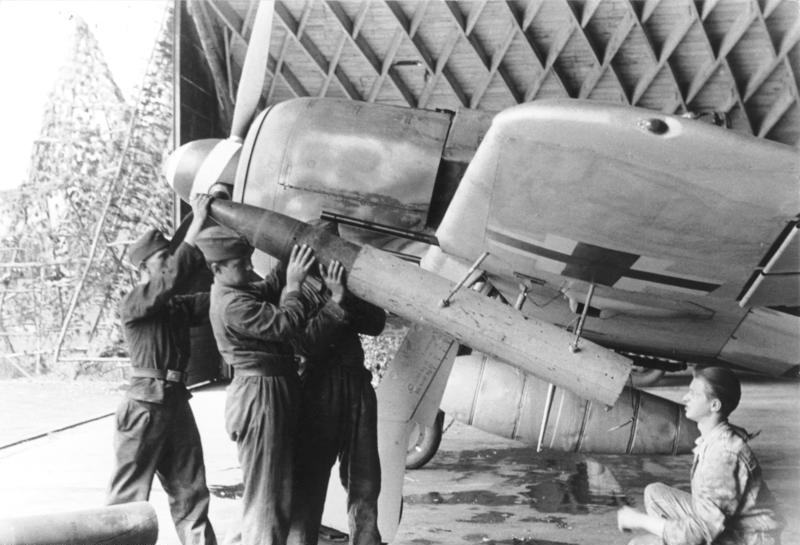
Arming the underwing WGr 21/BR 21 rocket mortar

The nomenclature was often confusing, as each Luftwaffe aircraft type — always defined by their RLM 8-xxx airframe number — used their own unique series of /R-series (as well as the factory fitted, Umrüst-Bausatz /U-series) numbers: the "/R2" kit for a Messerschmitt Bf 109G was for the fitment of a pair of the powerful Werfer-Granate 21 (Wfr. Gr. 21 or BR 21) underwing mounted rocket launchers, while the Focke-Wulf 190 used the "/R6" designation for this exact fitment.

The Focke-Wulf Fw 190 was well known for its various Rüstsätze, which included:

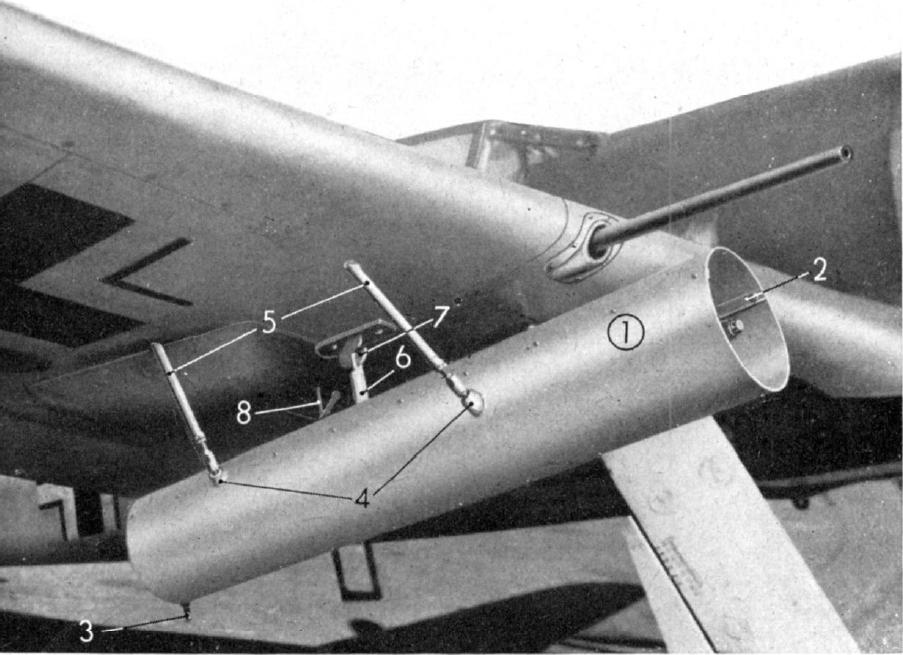
Details of an Fw 190's underwing BR 21's launch-tube mount

- R1: Standard radio equipment upgraded to the FuG 16ZE (as fitted to the Fw 190A-4 and A-5)
- R1: Addition of a WB (Waffen-Behälter) 151/20 cannon pod under each wing (as fitted to the Fw 190A-6, A-7 or A-8)
- R2: Addition of an MK 108 cannon pod mount under each wing (as fitted to the Fw 190A-6 and A-8)
- R2: Outboard wing mounted MK 108 cannon (as fitted to the Fw 190A-7, A-8 and A-9)
- R2: Addition of wing mounted MK 108 cannons and a fuselage center line mounted WGr (Werfer-Granate) 21 rocket (as fitted to the Fw 190A-8)
- R3: Addition of wing mounted MK 103 cannons (as fitted to the Fw 190A-6 and A-8)
- R4: Addition of fuselage fitted GM-1 nitrous boost system (as fitted to the Fw 190A-6 and A-8)
- R5: Addition of fuselage fitted 115 liter fuel tank (as fitted to the Fw 190A-8)
- R6: Addition of two wing mounted Werfer-Granate 21 (Wfr. Gr. 21 or BR 21) bomber destroyer rocket launchers (as fitted to the Fw 190A-4, A-5, A-6, A-7 and A-8)
- R7: Addition of armor to the cockpit (as fitted to the Fw 190A-6, A-7 and A-8)
- R8: Addition of wing mounted MK 108 cannons and cockpit armour (as fitted to the Fw 190A-8 and A-9)
- R11: Addition of FuG 125 radio, PKS 12 radio direction finder, and window heaters (as fitted to the Fw 190A-8 and A-9) and D-series airframes (also used for the Ta 152).
- R12: Addition of FuG 125 radio, PKS 12 radio direction finder, window heaters and wing mounted MK 108 cannons (as fitted to the Fw 190A-8)
- R14: Addition of ETC 502 torpedo rack (as fitted to the Ta 152)
