= Robot II =

135 film camera introduced in 1938

Robot IIa
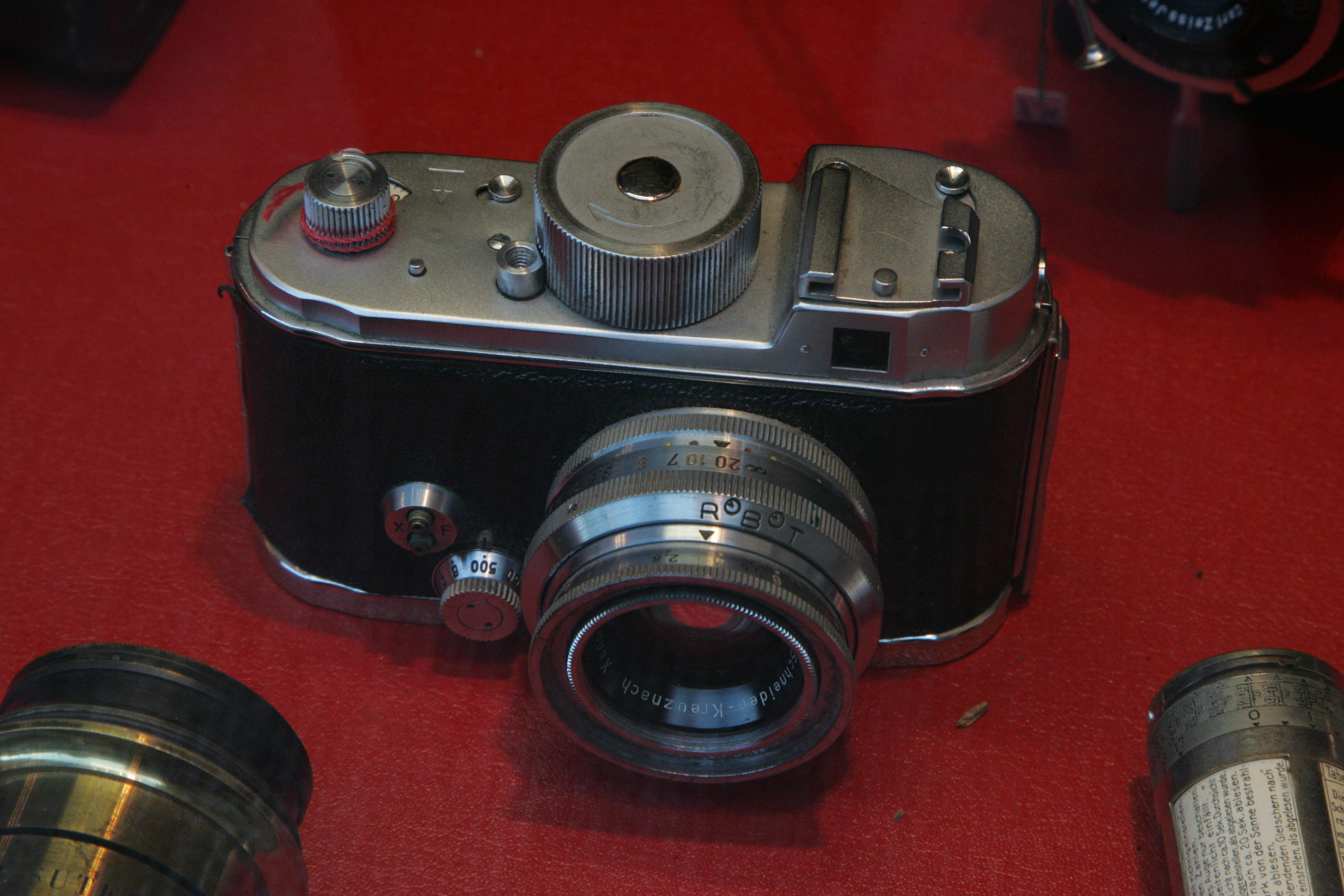

Overview
- Type: 135 film camera

Lens
- Lens mount: screw mount

Focusing
- Focus: manual

Shutter
- Frame rate: 5 frame/s

The Robot II was a mechanical 135 film camera by Robot introduced in 1938. It was a slightly larger camera than the Robot I, with some significant improvements but still using the basic mechanism. Among the standard objectives were 3 cm Zeiss Tessar and a 3 3/4 cm Zeiss Tessar in 1:2,8 and 1:3,5 variations, a 1:2,0/40 mm Zeiss Biotar and 1:4/7,5 cm Zeiss Sonnar.

The film cassette system was redesigned but it was only with the Robot IIa launched in 1951 that film could accept a standard 35 mm cassette. The special Robot cassettes type-N continued their role for take up. A small bakelite box was sold to allow people to rewind colour film into the original cassettes as demanded by the film processing companies. The camera was synchronized for flash. The swinging viewfinder was retained but now operated by a lever rather than moving the entire housing. Both the deep purple filter and the yellow filter were eliminated in the redesign. Some versions were available with a double wind motor which could expose 50 frames. The Second World War stopped civilian production of the Robot but it was used as a gun camera by the Luftwaffe.

The Robot II took square photographs in the 24×24mm format, which allowed 50 exposures to fit on a 36-exposure film. It featured an all-metal Rotor shutter (1/4 to 1/500), a direct vision finder, and a screw mount for interchangeable lenses by Schneider. The standard lens is a Schneider Xenon 40 mm f1.9.

Also available was the Robot Star II/50, with a double spring motor for 50 exposures and a Xenar 38 mm f2.8 lens.
