= Werfer-Granate 21 =

German WWII air-to-air rocket launcher

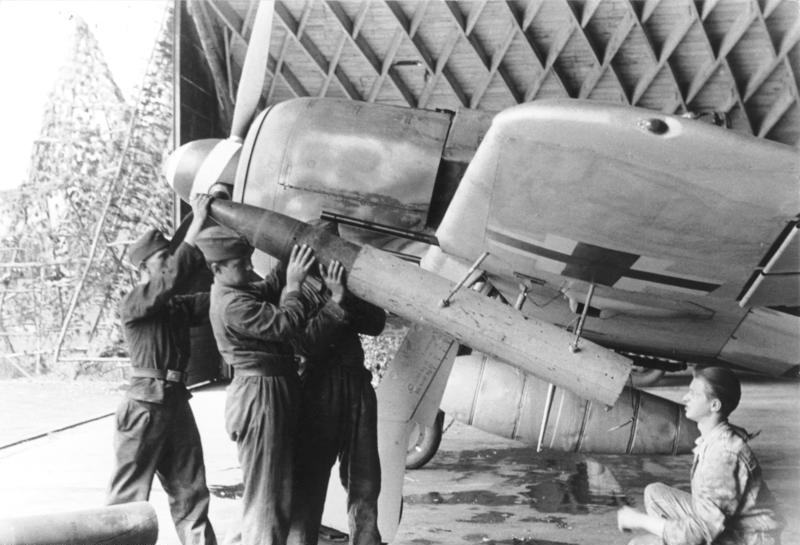
Arming the underwing Werfer-Granate 21 rocket mortar of an Fw 190 A-8/R6 of Stab/JG 26

The Werfer-Granate 21 rocket launcher, also known as the BR 21 (the "BR" standing for Bordrakete) in official Luftwaffe manuals, was a weapon used by the German Luftwaffe during World War II and was the first on-board rocket placed into service by the Luftwaffe, first introduced in mid 1943. Based on the 21 cm Nebelwerfer 42 infantry barrage rocket system's hardware, the weapon was developed by Rheinmetall-Borsig under the leadership of Dipl.-Ing. Rudolf Nebel, who had pioneered German use of wing-mounted offensive rocketry in World War I with the Luftstreitkräfte.

== History ==
The tight formations flown by USAAF heavy bombers allowed their defensive heavy machine guns to provide mutual cover to one another, and such a combat box was an extremely dangerous environment for a fighter aircraft to fly through, with dozens of heavy machine guns aimed at attacking Luftwaffe fighters from almost every conceivable direction. This led to numerous efforts to develop weapons that could attack the bombers outside the nominal 1,000 yards (910 m) effective range of their defensive guns.

This weapon enabled the German pilots to attack their bomber targets from a safer distance of over a kilometer, where the risk of being hit was much reduced. While a single fighter's payload of two or four such rockets was extremely unlikely to score a hit, a mass launch by an entire fighter squadron (a Staffel of 12-16 aircraft) as it arrived to intercept the bombers would likely score two or three hits, about 15% accuracy. The rocket's huge blast radius also compensated for inaccuracy, and even a non-lethal hit on a bomber by a showering of shrapnel would have psychological effects and perhaps cause it to take evasive manoeuvres that would drive it from the protection of its fellows.

JG 1 and JG 11 were the first front line units to utilise the weapon during the spring of 1943. During the autumn of 1943 the Bf 110 G-2 Zerstörer of ZG 26 and ZG 76 were also equipped with it.

These weapons were also sometimes used against ground targets from late 1943 onwards, such as in the Italian campaign 1943–44, the 1944 Normandy campaign and during the Ardennes Offensive.

== Design and capabilities ==
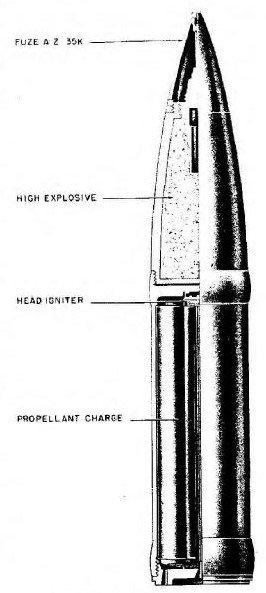
21 cm Wurfgranate 42.

Modified from the 21 cm Nebelwerfer 42 infantry barrage rocket projectile and reconfigured for air-launch, the spin-stabilised rocket was propelled by 18.4 kilograms (41 lb) diglycol solid fuel, and the warhead weighed 40.8 kilograms (90 lb). The Wfr. Gr. 21's projectile had a velocity of 320 metres (350 yd) per second (1,150 km/h, 716 mph) and a maximum range of 1,200 metres (1,300 yd). The rocket and tube weighed some 112 kilograms (247 lb) in total. A time fuse detonated the warhead at a pre-set distance of 600 metres (2,000 ft) to 1,200 metres (3,900 ft) from launch point, resulting in a lethal blast area approximately 30 metres (98 ft) wide.

== Usage ==
Single seat fighters carried a single tubular launcher under each wing, while the Zerstörer heavy twin engine fighters carried two under each wing. Operationally the weapon had several disadvantages; the launcher tubes produced significant air resistance, which reduced speed, maneuverability, and general performance. Unlike the firmly attached underwing conformal gun pods carried by many Luftwaffe anti-bomber single-engined fighters, however, the BR 21's tube launchers were jettisonable, and once the rockets had been fired the fighter could revert to a 'clean' profile.

== Shortcomings ==
The relatively low velocity of the rocket created a considerable problem in attempting to counter the resultant ballistic drop of such a slow-moving projectile, which required that the launcher tubes be mounted at a roughly 15° angle upwards from the line of flight, causing considerable drag on the airframe of the carrier aircraft. The low launch velocity and the high angle at which the rocket was launched meant that both accurate aiming and correct judgment of the target's distance were difficult. As a result, most of the rockets fired exploded either in front of or behind the bomber target. However, they did often achieve the effect of opening up the bomber formations enough for fighters to attack with conventional weapons.

== Aircraft armed with the Wfr. Gr. 21 ==
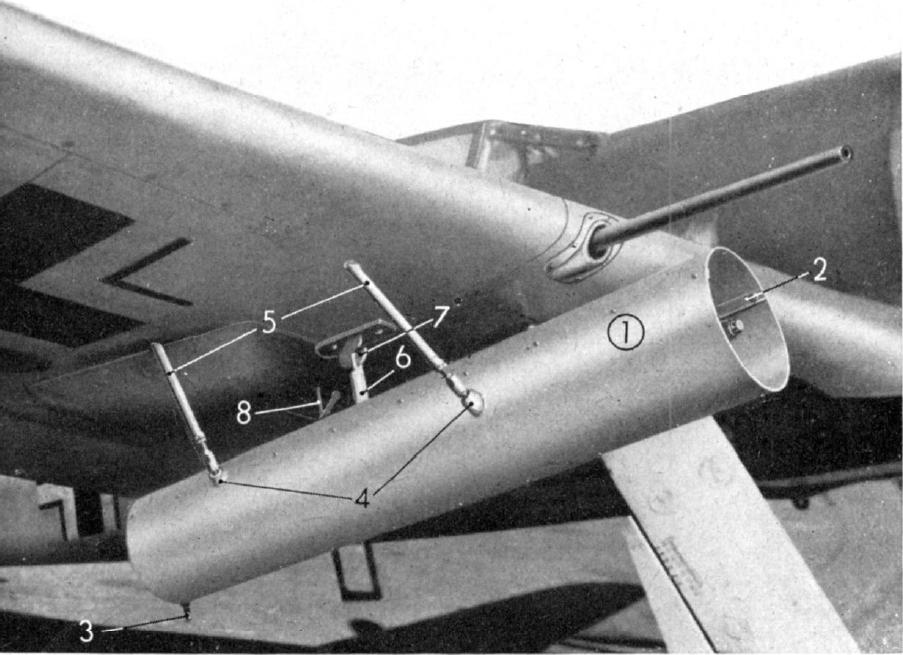
Details of the BR 21 rocket launch tube's installation on an Fw 190A.

Underwing mount (singly, one under each wing)

- Focke-Wulf Fw 190 A-7 and newer: as Rüstsatz 6 (/R6) modification
- Messerschmitt Bf 109G: as BR21 modification

Underwing mount (two under each wing)

- Messerschmitt Bf 110
- Messerschmitt Me 210
- Messerschmitt Me 410 Hornisse

Under-fuselage mount (one each side, from bomb racks flanking nosegear well)

- Messerschmitt Me 262

Outside the Luftwaffe

- IAR 80 - IAR 81C of the Royal Romanian Air Force was fitted with the Werfer-Granate 21 in 1944

== See also ==
- Tiny Tim, largest calibre (298 mm) aerial rocket of the U.S. Armed Forces in WW II
