= 21 cm Nebelwerfer 42 =

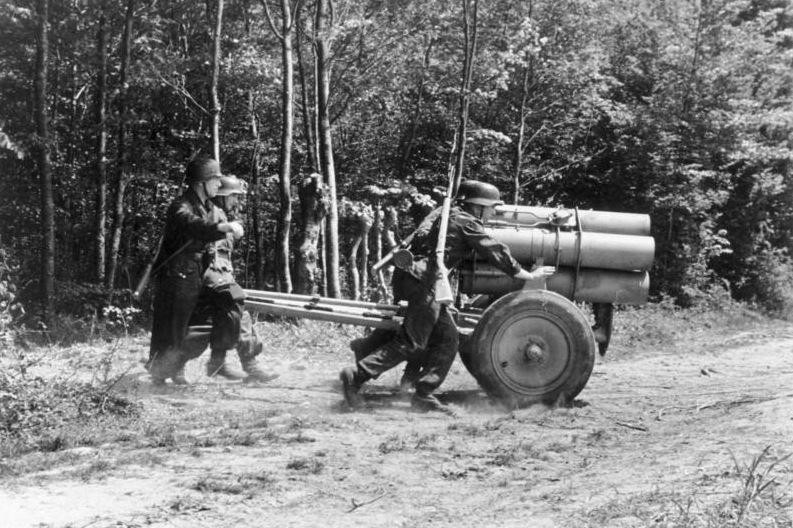
- A 21 cm Nebelwerfer 42 being manoeuvred into position in France, 1944
- Type: Rocket artillery
- Place of origin: Nazi Germany

Service history
- In service: 1942–1951
- Used by: Nazi Germany, France
- Wars: World War II

Production history
- Manufacturer: Donauwörth Machine Factory
- No. built: 2626

Specifications
- Mass: Empty: 550 kg (1,210 lb); Loaded: 1,100 kg (2,400 lb)
- Length: 3.6 m (11 ft 10 in)
- Barrel length: 1.3 m (4 ft 3 in)
- Width: 1.6 m (5 ft 3 in)
- Height: 1.5 m (4 ft 11 in)
- Crew: 4
- Shell: 1.25 m (4 ft 1 in)
- Shell weight: 109.55 kg (241.5 lb)
- Caliber: 21 cm (8.3 in)
- Barrels: 5
- Carriage: split-trail
- Elevation: -5° to +45°
- Traverse: 24°
- Muzzle velocity: 320 m/s (1,000 ft/s)
- Maximum firing range: 7,850 m (8,580 yd)
- Filling: HE
- Filling weight: 10.17 kg (22.4 lb)

The 21 cm Nebelwerfer 42 (21 cm NbW 42) was a German multiple rocket launcher used in the Second World War. It served with units of the Nebeltruppen, the German equivalent of the American Chemical Corps. Just as the Chemical Corps had responsibility for poison gas and smoke weapons that were used instead to deliver high-explosives during the war so did the Nebeltruppen. The name "Nebelwerfer" is best translated as "Smoke Mortar". It saw service from 1942–45 in all theaters except Norway. It was adapted for aerial combat by the Luftwaffe in 1943.

== Description ==
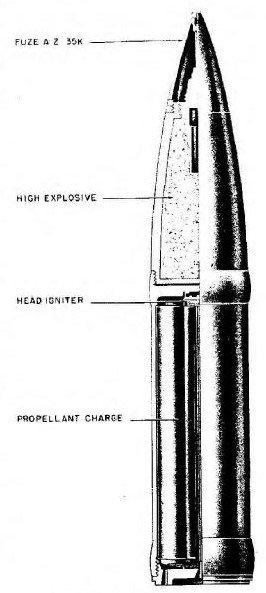
21 cm Wurfgranate 42

The 21 cm NbW 42 was a five-barreled multiple rocket launcher mounted on the towed carriage derived from that of the 3.7 cm PaK 36 anti-tank gun. A pivoting stabilising jack was added to the front of the carriage to steady the launcher when firing.

The 21 cm Wurfgranate (thrower-shell) 42 rockets were spin-stabilized, electrically-fired and had only high-explosive warheads. The rocket nozzle assembly contained 22 orifices evenly spaced around the rim of the nozzle with the orifices set an angle of 16° from the axis of the rocket to give the rocket clockwise rotation. The rockets had a prominent exhaust trail that kicked up a substantial amount of dust and debris, so the crew had to seek shelter before firing. This meant that they were easily located and had to relocate quickly to avoid counter-battery fire. The rockets were fired one at a time, in a timed ripple, but the launcher had no capability to fire single rockets. The rockets could be fitted with either impact or delay fuses as necessary. Liner rails could be fitted to allow the launcher to use 15 cm Wurfgranate 41 rockets with their HE, smoke and poison gas warheads.

The individual rockets were 1.26 metres (4 ft 2 in) long and weighed 109.55 kilograms (241.5 lb). Their high-explosive warhead weighed 10.17 kilograms (22.4 lb). They had a muzzle velocity of 320 m/s (1,000 ft/s) which gave them a range of 7,850 metres (8,580 yd). Despite the improved aerodynamics of the Wgr. 42 rocket over the 15 cm Wgr. 41 it proved to have similar dispersion problems; notably an area 500 metres (550 yd) long and 130 metres (140 yd) wide because of uneven burning of its propellant.

== Army use ==
The 21 cm NbW 42s were organized into batteries of six launchers with three batteries per battalion. These battalions were concentrated in independent Werfer-Regiments and Brigades. They saw service on the Eastern Front, North Africa, Italian Campaign and the defence of France and Germany from 1942—45.

American troops nicknamed the weapon Screaming Mimi from the noise of its rockets.

== Luftwaffe use as the Wfr. Gr. 21 (BR 21) rocket launcher ==
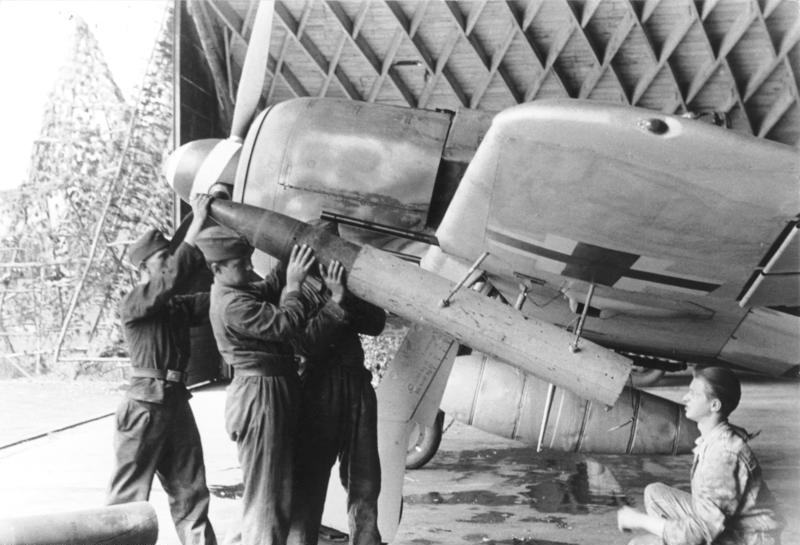
Arming a Fw 190 with a WGr. 21 rocket

The rocket was adapted for air-to-air use by the Luftwaffe in 1943 with a time fuse and a larger 40.8 kilograms (90 lb) warhead as the Wfr. Gr. 21, or BR 21 (for Bordrakete 21, as seen on German manuals) to disrupt Allied bomber formations, particularly the Eighth Air Force's combat box formations, and make them more vulnerable to attacks by German fighters while staying outside the range of defensive fire from the bombers. Single launch tubes were fitted under each wing of the Bf 109 and Fw 190 single-engined fighters, and two under each wing on the Bf 110 twin-engined fighters. The earliest known attack against American bombers with the underwing rockets was made on July 29, 1943, by elements of both JG 1 and JG 11, during American strategic bombing attacks on both Kiel and Warnemünde. Photographic evidence indicates that the Hungarians fitted three tubes under each wing of some of their twin-engined Me 210 Ca-1 heavy fighters. However, the high drag caused by the launchers reduced the speed and manoeuvrability of the launching aircraft, which could be lethal if Allied fighters were encountered. Also, the launch tube's under-wing mounting setup, which usually aimed the projectile at about 15° upwards from level flight to counter the considerable ballistic drop of the projectile in flight after launch, added to the drag problem. The American nickname for the 21 cm rockets was "flaming baseballs" from the fireball-like appearance of the projectiles in flight.

The Messerschmitt Me 410 Hornisse heavy fighter was known to have sometimes been fitted with the Bf 110's quartet of launchers for the Wfr. Gr. 21 rockets, but one tested an experimental installation of six launching tubes, similar in appearance to the 15 cm Nebelwerfer 41's half-dozen carriage-mounted tubes, in the Me 410's under-nose weapons bay. The tube assembly, with their axis angled upwards at 15° (as the underwing mountings were angled) was intended to rotate, as a revolver pistol's cylinder would, as each rocket to be fired was launched singly from the exposed tube at the bottom of the aircraft's nose. A test flight was made on 3 February 1944, but the concept proved to be a failure as the rockets' exhaust substantially damaged the aircraft.

A similar adaptation of the 21 cm Nebelwerfer's components were also used on an experimental bomber destroyer version of the He 177 heavy bomber, known as the Grosszerstörer, which proposed using upwards of thirty-three of the launch tubes, firing upwards from the mid-fuselage's bomb bay area at a 60° angle (similar to the effective Schräge Musik night fighter autocannon fitment) and firing slightly to starboard out the dorsal fuselage surface, flying two kilometers below the USAAF combat box formations – a few trial intercepts were attempted, without contact with USAAF bombers, and was doomed to fail from the swarms of American fighters protecting the bombers.
