= Nitrous oxide engine =

Automotive supplement

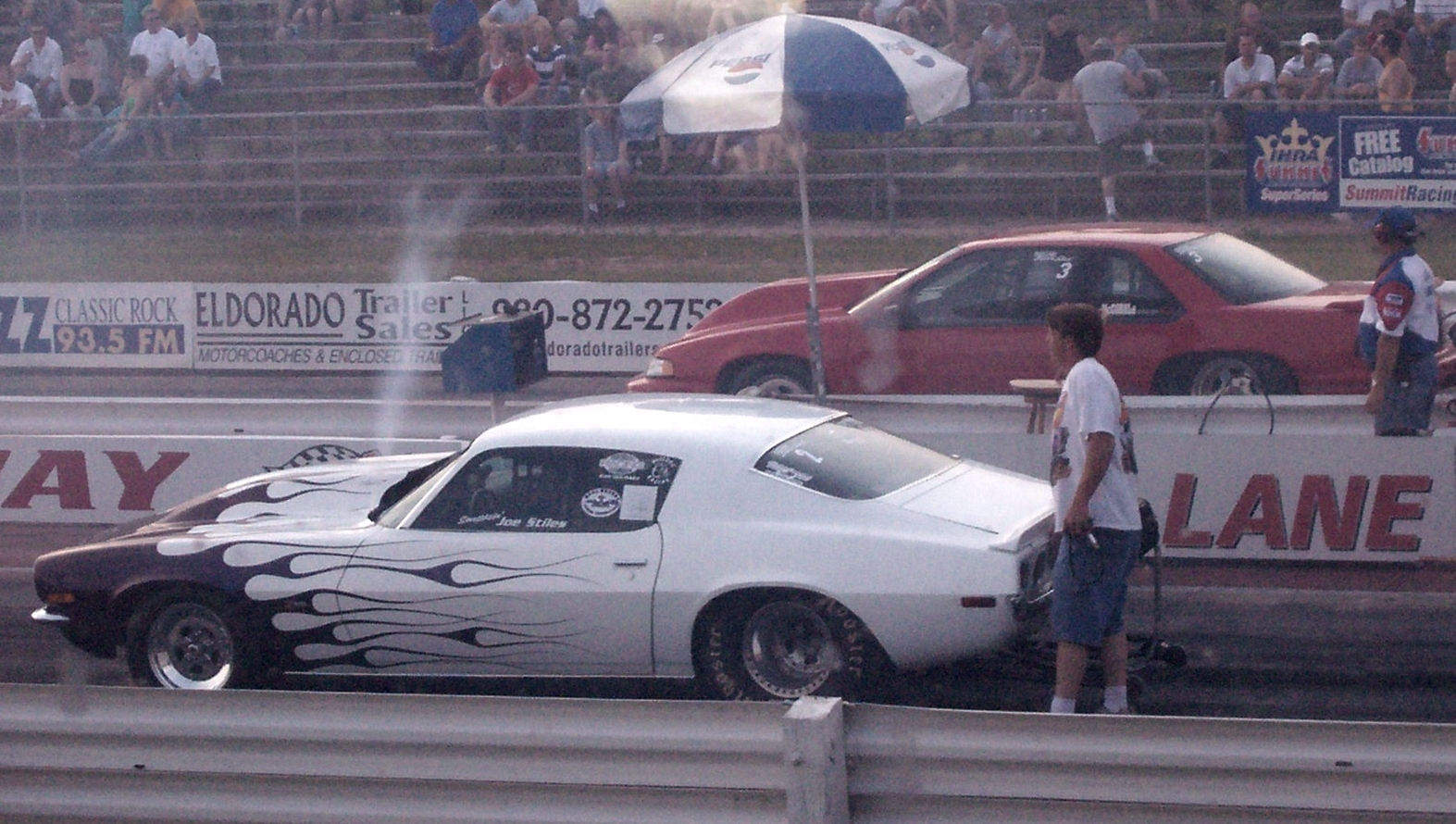
A performance vehicle using a nitrous oxide purging system

A nitrous oxide engine, or nitrous oxide system (NOS), is an internal combustion engine in which oxygen for burning the fuel comes from the decomposition of nitrous oxide, N_{2}O, as well as air. The system increases the engine's power output by allowing fuel to be burned at a higher-than-normal rate, because of the higher partial pressure of oxygen injected with the fuel mixture. Nitrous injection systems may be "dry", where the nitrous oxide is injected separately from fuel, or "wet" in which additional fuel is carried into the engine along with the nitrous. NOS may not be permitted for street or highway use, depending on local regulations. N_{2}O use is permitted in certain classes of auto racing. Reliable operation of an engine with nitrous injection requires careful attention to the strength of engine components and to the accuracy of the mixing systems, otherwise destructive detonations or exceeding engineered component maximums may occur. Nitrous oxide systems were applied as early as World War II for certain aircraft engines.

== Terminology ==
In the context of racing, nitrous oxide is often termed nitrous or NOS. The term NOS is derived from the initials of the company name Nitrous Oxide Systems, Inc. (now a brand of Holley Performance Products) one of the pioneering companies in the development of nitrous oxide injection systems for automotive performance use. Nitro is also sometimes used, though incorrect, as it refers more to nitromethane engines.

== Mechanism ==
When a mole of nitrous oxide decomposes, it releases half a mole of O_{2} molecules (oxygen gas), and one mole of N_{2} molecules (nitrogen gas). This decomposition allows an oxygen concentration of 36.36% to be reached. Nitrogen gas is non-combustible and does not support combustion. Air—which contains only 21% oxygen, the rest being nitrogen and other equally non-combustible and non-combustion-supporting gasses—permits a 12-percent-lower maximum-oxygen level than that of nitrous oxide. This oxygen supports combustion; it combines with fuels such as gasoline, alcohol, diesel fuel, propane, or compressed natural gas (CNG) to produce carbon dioxide and water vapor, along with heat, which causes the former two products of combustion to expand and exert pressure on pistons, driving the engine.

Nitrous oxide is stored as a liquid in tanks, but is a gas under atmospheric conditions. When injected as a liquid into an inlet manifold, the vaporization and expansion causes a reduction in air/fuel charge temperature with an associated increase in density, thereby increasing the cylinder's volumetric efficiency.

As the decomposition of N_{2}O into oxygen and nitrogen gas is exothermic and thus contributes to a higher temperature in the combustion engine, the decomposition increases engine efficiency and performance, which is directly related to the difference in temperature between the unburned fuel mixture and the hot combustion gasses produced in the cylinders.

All systems are based on a single stage kit, but these kits can be used in multiples (called two-, three-, or even four-stage kits). The most advanced systems are controlled by an electronic progressive delivery unit that allows a single kit to perform better than multiple kits can. Most Pro Mod and some Pro Street drag race cars use three stages for additional power, but more and more are switching to pulsed progressive technology. Progressive systems have the advantage of utilizing a larger amount of nitrous (and fuel) to produce even greater power increases as the additional power and torque are gradually introduced (as opposed to being applied to the engine and transmission immediately), reducing the risk of mechanical shock and, consequently, damage.

== Identification ==
Cars with nitrous-equipped engines may be identified by the "purge" of the delivery system that most drivers perform prior to reaching the starting line. A separate electrically operated valve is used to release air and gaseous nitrous oxide trapped in the delivery system. This brings liquid nitrous oxide all the way up through the plumbing from the storage tank to the solenoid valve or valves that will release it into the engine's intake tract. When the purge system is activated, one or more plumes of nitrous oxide will be visible for a moment as the liquid flashes to vapor as it is released. The purpose of a nitrous purge is to ensure that the correct amount of nitrous oxide is delivered the moment the system is activated as nitrous and fuel jets are sized to produce correct air / fuel ratios, and as liquid nitrous is denser than gaseous nitrous, any nitrous vapor in the lines will cause the car to "bog" for an instant (as the ratio of nitrous / fuel will be too rich reducing engine power) until liquid nitrous oxide reaches the injection nozzle.

== Types of nitrous systems ==
There are two categories of nitrous systems: dry & wet with four main delivery methods of nitrous systems: single nozzle, direct port, plate, and bar used to discharge nitrous into the plenums of the intake manifold. Nearly all nitrous systems use specific orifice inserts, called jets, along with pressure calculations to meter the nitrous, or nitrous and fuel in wet applications, delivered to create a proper air-fuel ratio (AFR) for the additional horsepower desired.

=== Dry ===
In a dry nitrous system the nitrous delivery method provides nitrous only. The extra fuel required is introduced through the fuel injectors, keeping the manifold dry of fuel. This property is what gives the dry system its name. Fuel flow can be increased either by increasing the pressure or by increasing the time the fuel injectors remain open.

Dry nitrous systems typically rely on a single nozzle delivery method, but all of the four main delivery methods can be used in dry applications. Dry systems are not typically used in carbureted applications due to the nature of a carburetor's function and inability to provide large amounts of on-demand fuel. Dry nitrous systems on fuel injected engines will use increased fuel pressure or injector pulsewidth upon system activation as a means of providing the correct ratio of fuel for the nitrous.

=== Wet ===
In a wet nitrous system the nitrous delivery method provides nitrous and fuel together resulting in the intake manifold being "wet" with fuel, giving the category its name. Wet nitrous systems can be used in all four main delivery methods.

In wet systems on fuel/direct injected engines care must be taken to avoid backfires caused by fuel pooling in the intake tract or manifold and/or uneven distribution of the nitrous/fuel mixture. Port and direct fuel injection engines have intake systems engineered for the delivery of air only, not air and fuel. Since most fuels are heavier than air and not in a gaseous state when used with nitrous systems it does not behave in the same way as air alone; thus the possibility of the fuel being unevenly distributed to the combustion chambers of the engine causing lean conditions/detonation and/or pooling in parts of the intake tract/manifold presenting a dangerous situation in which the fuel may be ignited uncontrollably causing catastrophic failure to components. Carbureted and single point/throttle body injected engines use a wet manifold design that is engineered to evenly distribute fuel and air mixtures to all combustion chambers, making this mostly a non-issue for these applications.

=== Single nozzle ===
A single nozzle nitrous system introduces the nitrous or fuel/nitrous mixture via a single injection point. The nozzle is typically placed in the intake pipe/tract after the air filter, prior to the intake manifold and/or throttle body in fuel injected applications, and after the throttle body in carbureted applications. In wet systems the high pressures of the nitrous injected causes the aerosolization of the fuel injected in tandem via the nozzle, allowing for more thorough and even distribution of the nitrous/fuel mixture.

=== Direct port ===
A direct port nitrous system introduces the nitrous or fuel/nitrous mixture as close to the intake ports of the engine as is feasible via individual nozzles directly in each intake runner. Direct port nitrous systems will use the same or similar nozzles as those in single nozzle systems, just in numbers equal to or in multiples of the number of intake ports of the engine. Being that direct port systems do not have to rely on intake tract/manifold design to evenly distribute the nitrous or fuel/nitrous mixture, they are inherently more precise than other delivery methods. The greater number of nozzles also allows a greater total amount of nitrous to be delivered than other systems. Multiple "stages" of nitrous can be accomplished by using multiple sets of nozzles at each intake port to further increase the power potential. Direct port nitrous systems are the most common delivery method in racing applications.

=== Plate ===
A plate nitrous system uses a spacer placed somewhere between the throttle body and intake ports with holes drilled along its interior surfaces, or in a tube that is suspended from the plate, for the nitrous or fuel/nitrous mixture to be distributed through. Plate systems provide a drill-less solution compared to other delivery methods as the plates are generally application specific and fit between existing components such as the throttle body-to-intake-manifold or upper-intake-manifold-to-lower-intake-manifold junctions. Requiring little more than longer fasteners, plate systems are the most easily reversed systems as they need little to no permanent changes to the intake tract. Dependent on application, plate systems can provide precise nitrous or fuel/nitrous mixture distribution similar to that of direct port systems.

=== Bar ===
A bar nitrous system utilizes a hollow tube, with a number of holes drilled along its length, placed inside the intake plenum to deliver nitrous. Bar nitrous delivery methods are almost exclusively dry nitrous systems due to the non-optimal fuel distribution possibilities of the bar. Bar nitrous systems are popular with racers that prefer their nitrous use to be hidden, as the nitrous distribution method is not immediately apparent and most associated components of the nitrous system can be obscured from view.

=== Propane or CNG ===
Nitrous systems can be used with a gaseous fuel such as propane or compressed natural gas. This has the advantage of being technically a dry system as the fuel is not in a liquid state when introduced to the intake tract.

== Reliability concerns ==
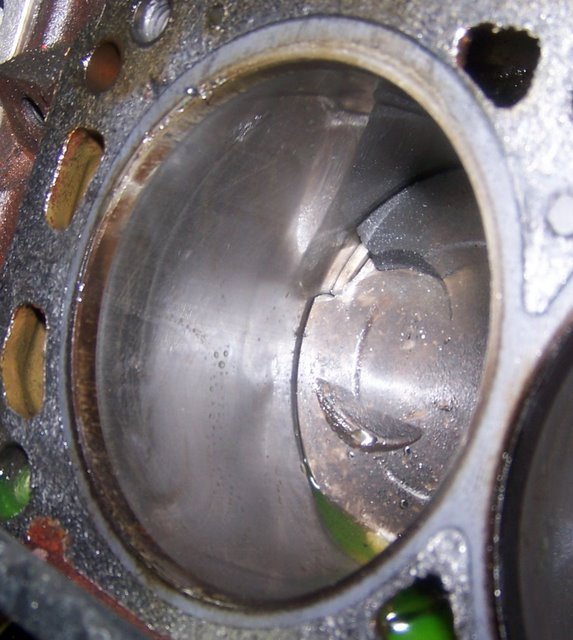
A piston which was cracked due to nitrous use

The use of nitrous oxide carries with it concerns about the reliability and longevity of an engine present with all power adders. Due to the greatly increased cylinder pressures, the engine as a whole is placed under greater stress, primarily those components associated with the engine's rotating assembly. An engine with components unable to cope with the increased stress imposed by the use of nitrous systems can experience major engine damage, such as cracked or destroyed pistons, connecting rods, crankshafts, and/or blocks. Proper strengthening of engine components in addition to accurate and adequate fuel delivery are key to nitrous system use without catastrophic failure.

In addition, nitrous oxide should not be used in vehicles with an automatic transmission, as the highly increased engine power and torque may cause stress damage to the torque converter and the transmission itself.

== Street legality ==
Nitrous oxide injection systems for automobiles are illegal for road use in some countries. For example, in New South Wales, Australia, the Roads & Traffic Authority Code of Practice for Light Vehicle Modifications (in use since 1994) states in clause 3.1.5.7.3 that "The use or fitment of nitrous oxide injection systems is not permitted."

In Great Britain, there are no restrictions on the use of N_{2}O, but the modification must be declared to the insurance company, which is likely to result in a higher premium or refusal to insure.

In Germany, despite its strict TÜV rules, a nitrous system can be installed and used legally in a street driven car. The requirements for the technical standard of the system are similar to those of aftermarket natural gas conversions.

== Racing rules ==
The 1976 Daytona 500 was rocked by a scandal after NASCAR discovered nitrous oxide in top qualifying cars. Most motorsport sanctioning bodies disallow nitrous oxide, and nitrous oxide is strictly prohibited in drag racing with the professional classes. Nitrous oxide was once part of Pro Modified, but as the number of forced induction cars have taken over the class, some groups (PDRA, IHRA) have added a nitrous oxide specific class ("Pro Nitrous"). Nitrous is allowed in Formula Drift competition.

== History ==
A similar basic technique was used during World War II by Luftwaffe aircraft with the GM-1 system to maintain the power output of aircraft engines when at high altitude where the air density is lower. Accordingly, it was only used by specialized planes like high-altitude reconnaissance aircraft, high-speed bombers and high-altitude interceptors. It was sometimes used with the Luftwaffe's form of methanol-water injection, designated MW 50 (both meant as Notleistung short-term power boosting measures), to produce substantial increases in performance for fighter aircraft over short periods of time, as with their combined use on the Focke-Wulf Ta 152H fighter prototypes.

British World War II usage of nitrous oxide injector systems were modifications of Merlin engines carried out by the Heston Aircraft Company for use in certain night fighter variants of the de Havilland Mosquito and photo reconnaissance versions of the Supermarine Spitfire.

== See also ==
- Car tuning
- Turbocharger
- Water injection (engine)
- Racing games, which prominently features nitrous oxide systems to increase performance
- Halogen engine, an internal combustion engine that uses chlorine or fluorine as an oxidizer
