= War emergency power =

Emergency throttle setting on military aircraft

War emergency power (WEP) is a throttle setting that was first present on some American World War II military aircraft engines. For use in emergency situations, it produced more than 100% of the engine's normal rated power for a limited amount of time, often about five minutes. Similar systems used by non-US forces are now often referred to as WEP as well, although they may not have been at the time, as with the German Luftwaffe's Notleistung and Soviet VVS' forsazh systems.

== WEP in World War II aircraft ==
Maximum normal power would be limited by a mechanical stop, for instance a wire across the throttle lever slot. A more forceful push would break the wire, allowing extra power. In normal service, the P-51H Mustang was rated at 1,380 hp (1,030 kW), but WEP would deliver up to 2,218 hp (1,654 kW), an increase of 61%. In the P-51D Mustang, the model most produced and used during World War II, the WEP increased engine power from 1,490 to 1,720 hp (1,110 to 1,280 kW), over 15%. The Vought F4U Corsair, not originally equipped for WEP, later boasted a power increase of up to 410 hp (310 kW) (17%) when WEP was engaged. Several methods were used to boost engine power by manufacturers, including water injection and methanol-water injection. Some earlier engines simply allowed the throttle to open wider than normal, allowing more air to flow through the intake. All WEP methods result in greater-than-usual stresses on the engine, and correspond to a reduced engine lifetime. For some airplanes, such as the P-51D, use of WEP required that the engine be inspected for damage before returning to the air. 5 hours' total use of WEP on the P-51D required a complete tear-down inspection of the engine.

British and Commonwealth aircraft could increase power by increasing the supercharger boost pressure. This modification was common by the summer of 1940, with the widespread availability of 100 octane fuel. Raising supercharger boost pressure from 6 to 12 psi (41 to 83 kPa) increased the Merlin III engine rating from 1,060 hp (790 kW) to 1,310 hp (980 kW), an increase of 23%. Pilots had to log the use of emergency boost and were advised not to use it for more than 5 minutes continuously.

The German MW 50 methanol-water injection system required additional piping, as well as a storage tank, increasing the aircraft's overall weight. Like other boost techniques, MW 50 was restricted by capacity and engine temperatures and could only be used for a limited time. The GM 1 nitrous oxide injection system, also used by the Luftwaffe, provided extreme power benefits of 25 to 30 percent at high altitude by adding oxidizer gases but required cooling on the ground and, like the MW 50 boost system, added significant weight. One of the few German aircraft that could be equipped with both Notleistung systems, the late war Focke-Wulf Ta 152H high-altitude fighter, could attain a velocity of some 470 mph (756 km/h) with both systems used together. Kurt Tank reportedly once did this, using both boost systems simultaneously when he was flying a Junkers Jumo 213E-powered Ta 152H prototype fitted with both MW 50 and GM-1, to escape a flight of P-51D Mustangs in April 1945.

== Modern times ==
=== MiG-21 ===
Perhaps the most dramatic WEP feature was found in the MiG-21bis fighter jet. This late variant of the standard Soviet light fighter plane was built as a stopgap measure to counter the newer and more powerful American F-16 and F/A-18 fighters until the next-generation MiG-29 could be introduced to service.

The MiG-21bis received the upgraded Tumansky R-25 engine, which retained the standard 9,400 / 14,600 lbf (42 / 65 kN) normal and afterburner power settings of earlier R-13 powerplants, but with emergency thrust boost from an overspeed to 106% and increased afterburner fuel from a second afterburner fuel pump. Use of this boost feature provided 21,900 lbf (97.4 kN) of thrust for 2 minutes maximum in wartime. It gave the MiG-21bis slightly better than 1:1 thrust-to-weight ratio and a climb rate of 50,000 ft/min (254 m/s), equalling F-16 capabilities in a dogfight.

In air combat practice with the MiG-21bis, use of WEP thrust was limited to one minute, to reduce the impact on the engine 800 hours time between overhaul, since every second of WEP was equivalent to several minutes of running without it. When WEP was selected, the R-25 produced a 16 feet (5 m) long blowtorch exhaust - the six or seven brightly glowing rhomboid "shock diamonds" visible inside the flames gave the emergency-power setting its "diamond regime" name.

=== F-15 ===
The Vmax switch on the F-15 fighter jet allows the engines to burn 22 degrees hotter and about 2% more revolutions per minute, as well as boosting engine and afterburner fuel flow by around 4%. It is safety-wired shut. During combat, pulling the Vmax switch would provide the pilot with more thrust. However, Vmax usage is limited to a maximum of six minutes, and the engines would then need to be serviced and rebuilt.

=== Concorde ===
The concept of WEP found its way into civilian designs as well. The Concorde supersonic airliner was powered by four Rolls-Royce/Snecma Olympus 593 afterburning turbojets, which possessed the ability to operate in a mode termed "Contingency Power". This was to be utilized in the event of an engine failure on takeoff and would be selected by moving the afterburner selector switches an additional notch upward. Able to be engaged for no more than two and a half minutes at a time, Contingency Power provided an extra 1.1% more revolutions per minute over takeoff power, as well as simultaneously increasing fuel flow to the afterburners. When this mode was selected, an orange indicator light would illuminate over the engine RPM gauges. Each use was to be recorded by the crew, as it reduced the life of the engines.

== WEP in surface vehicles ==
Some modern military surface vehicles also employ WEP features. The US Marine Corps Expeditionary Fighting Vehicle (cancelled in 2011) sported a 12-cylinder 1,200 bhp (890 kW) diesel engine developed by the German company MTU. When the EFV is swimming the powerplant can be boosted to 2,700 hp (2,000 kW) via the use of open circuit seawater-cooling. Such extreme war power setting allows the MTU engine to drive four massive water-jet exhausts which propel the surface-effect riding EFV at sea speeds reaching 35 knots (65 km/h).

Although the EFV prototypes demonstrated revolutionary performance on water and land, the reliability of their extremely boosted powerplants never met stringent military standards and the vehicle failed to enter Marine Corps service.

== Boost systems ==
- Water injection
- MW50 (German, methanol/water mixture)
- GM 1 (German, nitrous oxide injection)
- Forsazh (Russian)
- Propane injection

== See also ==
- Index of aviation articles
- List of aviation, avionics, aerospace and aeronautical abbreviations
- Battleshort
- Afterburner
- Supercruise
- Flank speed
- Wartime reserve mode
