= Flight 411 =

Flight 411 may refer to:

- British European Airways Flight 411, crashed on 14 March 1957
- Mohawk Airlines Flight 411, crashed on 19 November 1969
- Olympic Airways Flight 411, had an engine explode on 9 August 1978
- Aeroflot Flight 411, crashed on 6 July 1982
