= Electronic counter-countermeasure =

Part of electronic warfare

- Type: Electronic warfare

Service history
- Used by: Military

Electronic counter-countermeasures (ECCM) is a part of electronic warfare which includes a variety of practices which attempt to reduce or eliminate the effect of electronic countermeasures (ECM) on electronic sensors aboard vehicles, ships and aircraft and weapons such as missiles. ECCM is also known as electronic protective measures (EPM), chiefly in Europe. In practice, EPM often means resistance to jamming. A more detailed description defines it as the electronic warfare operations taken by a radar to offset the enemy's countermeasure.

== History ==
Ever since electronics have been used in battle in an attempt to gain superiority over the enemy, effort has been spent on techniques to reduce the effectiveness of those electronics. More recently, sensors and weapons are being modified to deal with this threat. One of the most common types of ECM is radar jamming or spoofing. This originated with the Royal Air Force's use of what they codenamed Window during World War II, which Americans referred to as chaff. It was first used during the Hamburg raid on July 24-25, 1943. Jamming also may have originated with the British during World War II, when they began jamming German radio communications. These efforts include the successful British disruption of German Luftwaffe navigational radio beams.

In perhaps the first example of ECCM, the Germans increased their radio transmitter power in an attempt to 'burn through' or override the British jamming, which by necessity of the jammer being airborne or further away produced weaker signals. This is still one of the primary methods of ECCM today. For example, modern airborne jammers are able to identify incoming radar signals from other aircraft and send them back with random delays and other modifications in an attempt to confuse the opponent's radar set, making the 'blip' jump around wildly and become impossible to range. More powerful airborne radars means that it is possible to 'burn through' the jamming at much greater ranges by overpowering the jamming energy with the actual radar returns. The Germans were not really able to overcome the chaff spoofing very successfully and had to work around it (by guiding the aircraft to the target area and then having them visually acquire the targets).

Today, more powerful electronics with smarter software for operation of the radar might be able to better discriminate between a moving target like an aircraft and an almost stationary target like a chaff bundle. The technology powering modern sensors and seekers allow all successful systems partly due to ECCM designed into them. Today, electronic warfare is composed of ECM, ECCM and, electronic reconnaissance/intelligent (ELINT) activities.

Examples of electronic counter-countermeasures include the American Big Crow program, which served as a Bear bomber and a standoff jammer. It was a modified Air Force NKC-135A and was built to provide capability and flexibility of conducting varied and precision electronic warfare experiments. Throughout its 20-year existence, the U.S. government developed and installed over 3,143 electronic counter-countermeasures to its array of weapons. There is also the BAMS Project, which was funded by the Belgian government since 1982. This system, together with advanced microelectronics, also provided secure voice, data, and text communications under the most severe electronic warfare conditions.

== Specific ECCM techniques ==
The following are some examples of EPM (other than simply increasing the fidelity of sensors through techniques such as increasing power or improving discrimination):

=== ECM detection ===
Sensor logic may be programmed to be able to recognize attempts at spoofing (e.g., aircraft dropping chaff during terminal homing phase) and ignore them. Even more sophisticated applications of ECCM might be to recognize the type of ECM being used, and be able to cancel out the signal.

=== Pulse compression by "chirping", or linear frequency modulation ===
One of the effects of the pulse compression technique is boosting the apparent signal strength as perceived by the radar receiver. The outgoing radar pulses are chirped, that is, the frequency of the carrier is varied within the pulse, much like the sound of a cricket chirping. When the pulse reflects off a target and returns to the receiver, the signal is processed to add a delay as a function of the frequency. This has the effect of "stacking" the pulse so it seems stronger, but shorter in duration, to further processors. The effect can increase the received signal strength to above that of noise jamming. Similarly, jamming pulses (used in deception jamming) will not typically have the same chirp, so will not benefit from the increase in signal strength.

=== Frequency hopping ===
Frequency agility ("frequency hopping") may be used to rapidly switch the frequency of the transmitted energy, and receiving only that frequency during the receiving time window. This foils jammers which cannot detect this switch in frequency quickly enough or predict the next hop frequency, and switch their own jamming frequency accordingly during the receiving time window. The most advanced jamming techniques have a very wide and fast frequency range, and might possibly jam out an antijammer.

This method is also useful against barrage jamming in that it forces the jammer to spread its jamming power across multiple frequencies in the jammed system's frequency range, reducing its power in the actual frequency used by the equipment at any one time. The use of spread-spectrum techniques allow signals to be spread over a wide enough spectrum to make jamming of such a wideband signal difficult.

=== Sidelobe blanking ===
Radar jamming can be effective from directions other than the direction the radar antenna is currently aimed. When jamming is strong enough, the radar receiver can detect it from a relatively low gain sidelobe. The radar, however, will process signals as if they were received in the main lobe. Therefore, jamming can be seen in directions other than where the jammer is located. To combat this, an omnidirectional antenna is used for a comparison signal. By comparing the signal strength as received by both the omnidirectional and the (directional) main antenna, signals can be identified that are not from the direction of interest. These signals are then ignored.

=== Polarization ===
Polarization can be used to filter out unwanted signals, such as jamming. If a jammer and receiver do not have the same polarization, the jamming signal will incur a loss that reduces its effectiveness. The four basic polarizations are linear horizontal, linear vertical, right-hand circular, and left-hand circular. The signal loss inherent in a cross polarized (transmitter different from receiver) pair is 3 dB for dissimilar types, and 17 dB for opposites.

Aside from power loss to the jammer, radar receivers can also benefit from using two or more antennas of differing polarization and comparing the signals received on each. This effect can effectively eliminate all jamming of the wrong polarization, although enough jamming may still obscure the actual signal.

=== Radiation homing ===
Another practice of ECCM is to program sensors or seekers to detect attempts at ECM and possibly even to take advantage of them. Specialized anti-radiation missiles (ARMs) have existed even before modern jammers to target radar sites and they can be repurposed to target ECM. The jamming in this case effectively becomes a beacon announcing the presence and location of the transmitter. This makes the use of such ECM a difficult decision – it may serve to obscure an exact location from non-ARMs, but in doing so it must put the jamming vehicle at risk of being targeted and hit by ARMs.

Some modern fire-and-forget missiles like the Vympel R-77 and the AMRAAM use a combined approach, by using radar in the normal case, but switching to an antiradiation mode if the jamming is too powerful to allow them to find and track the target normally. This mode, called "home-on-jam", actually makes the missile's job easier, as the jammer usually puts out more power than normal radar return would.

== See also ==
- Jamming
- Electronic warfare
  - Electronic warfare support measures
- Wartime reserve mode
