= Water injection =

Water injection may refer to:

- Water injection (engine), for increasing efficiency or power of internal combustion engines
- Water injection (oil production), for increasing the amount of petroleum extracted from oil wells
- Water injection well, a type of groundwater well through which water is injected into an aquifer system

== See also ==
- Injector
- Water for injection
