= Olympic Airways Flight 411 =

1978 aviation accident in Greece

Coordinates: 37.898333°N 23.729444°E

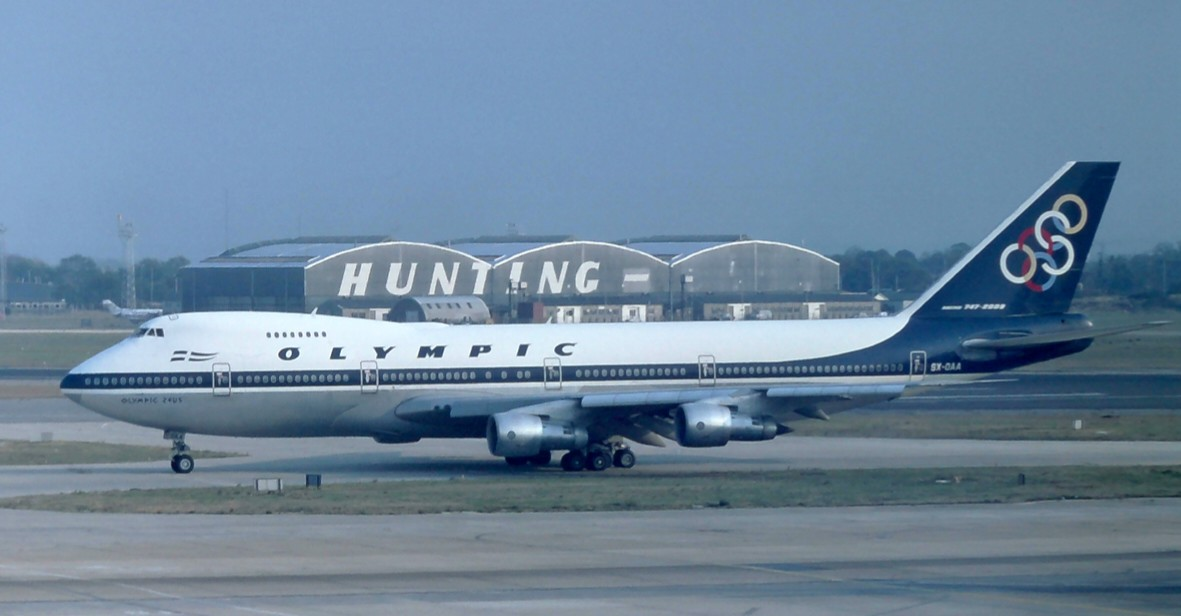
- SX-OAA, the aircraft involved in the accident, pictured in 1976

Accident
- Date: August 9, 1978
- Summary: Loss of speed and altitude due to engine failure and flight crew error; safely returned to airport
- Site: Athens, Greece

Aircraft
- Aircraft type: Boeing 747-284B (Note: Olympic Airways had five 747s, two were built for Olympia with the 747-284 model number, and three that Olympic Airways purchased from Singapore Airlines, with the 747-212 model number. Its first flight was June 2, 1973, Olympic Airways received the plane on June 21, 1973. It went to TWA on April 10, 1985. It was broken up at Marana, Arizona in the United States in March 1999.)
- Aircraft name: Olympic Zeus
- Operator: Olympic Airways
- IATA flight No.: OA411
- ICAO flight No.: OAL411
- Call sign: OLYMPIC 411
- Registration: SX-OAA
- Flight origin: Ellinikon International Airport, Athens, Greece
- Destination: John F. Kennedy International Airport, New York, United States
- Occupants: 418 (Note: Greek newspapers reported that there were 400 passengers, 18 crew, and a total of 418 total people on board. The plane arrived safely back at the airport.)
- Passengers: 400
- Crew: 18
- Fatalities: 0
- Survivors: 418

Olympic Airways Flight 411 was an international flight from Ellinikon International Airport bound for John F. Kennedy International Airport and operated by Olympic Airways using a Boeing 747-200. On August 9, 1978, the flight came close to crashing in downtown Athens. Despite maneuvers near the edge of the flight envelope, none of the 418 passengers and crew suffered serious injury.

Based on the flight data recorder and information supplied by Olympic Airways, Boeing found that engine No. 3 shut down at rotation and that approximately nine seconds later the crew switched off the water injection pumps. An Olympic Airways investigation found that the flight engineer had misinterpreted the extinguished No. 3 "WATER FLOW" warning light as indicating that the water supply had run out. Go-around thrust was not initially applied to the remaining engines; thrust was increased after a delay of approximately 30 seconds, although it initially remained below go-around thrust on most engines. Boeing concluded that no additional malfunction of the airframe or engines caused the poor climb performance; rather, shutting off the water injection reduced available thrust on an aircraft that was already takeoff-climb limited. The aircraft recovered after the crew lowered the nose to accelerate and increased engine thrust.

Captain Sifis Migadis and Captain Kostas Fikardos managed to keep the aircraft in the air at an extremely low altitude below minimal speed. All Boeing simulations of the flight resulted in crashes.

== Flight details ==
=== Background ===
The Boeing 747 was the first wide-body aircraft. It was a prestige aircraft in the 1970s and purchased by many airlines as a fleet flagship. Olympic Airways received its first 747 in 1973. Olympic Airways was the flag carrier for Greece and had purchased 747s for some of its prime routes, including a nonstop between Athens and New York. This meant that large numbers of American tourists could be accommodated in one flight at lower per-seat costs to the airlines.

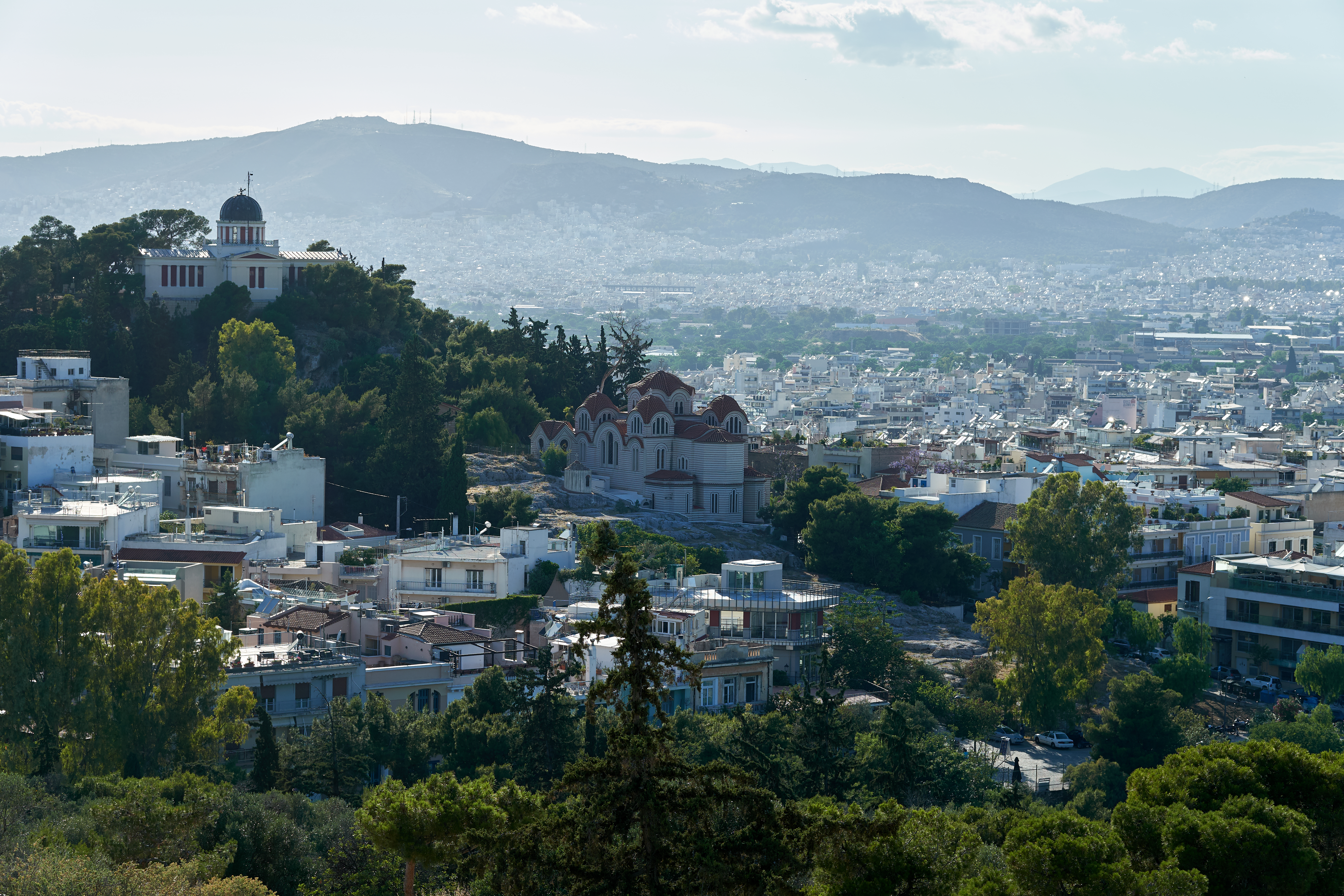
View from the Areopagus of the Hill of the Nymphs, with Mount Aigaleo in the distance

Athens lies in the center of four large mountains: Mount Aigaleo to the west, Mount Parnitha to the north, Mount Pentelicus to the northeast and Mount Hymettus to the east. The geographical area is called Athens Basin or the Attica Basin (Greek: Λεκανοπέδιο Αθηνών/Αττικής). The meteorology of Athens is deemed to be one of the most complex in the world because its mountains cause a temperature inversion phenomenon. The temperature that day was 32 °C (90 °F).

In command was 55-year-old Sifis Migadis, who had 32 years of experience with Olympic. The co-pilot, Konstantinos "Kostas" Fikardos, was equally experienced and was a close friend of Migadis.

=== Aircraft ===
SX-OAA, named Olympic Zeus, was an Olympic Boeing 747-200. The 747-200 model featured more powerful engines and a higher maximum takeoff weight (MTOW) than the previous 747-100 model. One of the principal technologies that enabled an aircraft as large as the 747 to takeoff was the high-bypass turbofan engine. In the late 1960s, Pratt & Whitney developed a new such engine, and designated the JT9D to power the 747; with water injection, it delivered more thrust for the heavy jumbo jet.

On August 9, 1978, 418 passengers and crew were scheduled to take off from Athens at 2:00 pm on a direct flight to New York. The plane was heavy with the 160 tons of fuel required for the transatlantic flight. The plane, which weighed 350,000 kilograms (770,000 lb) on the day of the flight, was takeoff climb limited at 353,000 kilograms (778,000 lb) using the JT9D-7A wet thrust engine. (Note: At takeoff, the flaps were set to 20, A/C packs were off, the temperature was 32 °C (90 °F), the atmospheric pressure was 29.83 inHg, and the wind from/speed was 310/12 knots (22 km/h; 14 mph). The plane took off from runway 33R with a -.28% slope.)

=== Flight summary ===
According to Boeing, engines 3 and 4 idled lower than usual as the aircraft taxied. The plane initially took off and climbed normally. (Note: It was also reported that as the plane moved down the runway, it was hard for the pilots to get enough speed for takeoff. Just before lifting off, the crew heard an explosion, the plane had suffered an engine failure from the #3 engine. By that time, the plane had exceeded the takeoff safety speed, meaning it was no longer safe to abort the take-off. Boeing's investigation found that the incident began just after takeoff.) Boeing states that around nine seconds after engine #3 failure, the water pump switch was turned off, when the flight crew misinterpreted the "water flow" warning as "water run-out". Speed decreased and altitude was lost.

The two captains, contrary to the aircraft flight manual, immediately ordered the landing gear retracted when the plane was 35 feet (11 m) above the runway. Migadis and Fikardos used their knowledge of aerodynamics to prevent the plane from stalling. The minimum speed for a 747 is 180 miles per hour (160 kn; 290 km/h). The pilots needed to fly level and avoid turning as much as possible. They also focused on getting the plane away from the city and to an unpopulated area, like Mount Aigaleo, to reduce the loss of lives if the plane crashed. While Migadis and Fikardos flew the plane, the engineer focused on the problems with the engines.

The plane climbed sluggishly to an altitude of just 209 feet (64 m) as it approached the 200-foot-tall (61 m) Pani Hill in Alimos, after which the plane lost altitude. As it passed over Kallithea, Nea Smyrni, and Andrea Syngrou Avenue, its altitude was only 180 feet (55 m) and its speed was 160 miles per hour (140 kn; 260 km/h). (Note: It is also stated that the plane was 60 feet (18 m) above Egaleo's apartment buildings.) The plane flew just above apartment rooftops and took down some television antennas. At some point, Fikardos and Migadis lowered the nose of the plane to gain speed and the engineer was able to increase the engines' power. When the speed reached 170 miles per hour (150 kn; 270 km/h), Migadis and Fikardos worked on increasing altitude and heading towards the sea.

The larger obstacle of Mount Aigaleo at 1,539 feet (469 m) was of great concern because the low airspeed and minimal altitude did not leave the flight crew enough room to execute a normal banked turn. At 2:05 pm, a light headwind gave the plane some altitude, which allowed Migadis and Fikardos to make a gradual turn to avoid crashing into the mountain. After flying over the sea to dump fuel, the aircraft returned to Ellinikon International Airport safely. (Note: The same day at 6 p.m. Migadis and Fikardos flew another plane safely to New York.)

== Conclusions ==
The Air Accident Investigation and Aviation Safety Board, the Greek national air safety board that investigates aviation accidents and incidents, was not established until 2004. Brien S. Wygle, the vice president of Customer Support at Boeing, issued a report entitled Performance Analysis of the Olympic Airways Takeoff at Athens on August 9, 1978 with an Engine Failure at Rotation to Alex Fissher, Director of Flight Standards at the Greek Civilian Aviation Authority. Boeing concluded that,

...no malfunction in airframe or engines caused the lack of performance following takeoff. Instead, the problem was caused by the inadvertent shut off of the water injection pumps by the flight crew and the resulting decrease in thrust. Loss of wet thrust in a situation where the airplane was takeoff climb limited severely reduced the ability to continue the flight with any significant amount of positive climb gradient. Once thrust was manually increased at a coordination time of approximately 325 seconds, the airplane climbed out in a normal manner.

— Brien S. Wygle, vice president of Customer Service, Boeing

Newspapers reported that engine three exploded during takeoff due to overheating of the turbine cooling pipes. From the flight recorder, the lowest speed during the flight was 158 miles per hour (137 kn; 254 km/h). The dangerous period of the flight lasted 93 seconds. Migadis managed to keep the aircraft in the air at an extremely low altitude and with below-minimum speed. All Boeing simulations of the flight resulted in crashes. Olympic Airways changed some of its procedures based upon the lessons learned from this flight. Boeing's training curriculum includes review of this case.

== Other factors ==
In the late 1960s, Pratt & Whitney developed the JT9D engine on an accelerated timetable, which resulted in engine flaws. (Note: Pan Am's inaugural flight to London was delayed due to the overheated JT9D engine. Boeing sued United Aircraft for $94 million for JT9D engine-related issues. The aircraft manufacturer recorded a loss of $43 million in 1971, as the result of a $137 million writeoff that was directly attributed to the JT9D engine. Improvements were made to the engine in later versions.) In the 1970s, the JT9D engine had a number of mechanical issues and proper maintenance was required to ensure the engine's safety. For instance, high-pressure turbine core fan blades could become damaged and require replacement after 500 hours. The JT9D engines were also sensitive to tailwind airflow conditions at start. The early JT9D engines could flame out if the thrust levers were slammed forward. The jarring movement could put pressure on the engine and ultimately result in a flame out.

On September 18, 1970, American Airlines Flight 14 took off from San Francisco for New York. Sixteen seconds after the Boeing 747 took off, the Pratt & Whitney JT9D number 1 engine exploded after its turbine blades disintegrated. It was at an altitude of 525 feet (160 m). The National Transportation Safety Board (NTSB) said in its incident report that this was likely due to an ongoing pattern of the engine overheating during starting procedures. The plane returned to the airport and landed safely.
