= Wartime reserve mode =

Wartime reserve modes (abbreviated as WARM) are military procedures held in reserve for wartime or emergency use. They concern the characteristics and operating procedures of sensor, communications, navigation aids, threat recognition, weapons, and countermeasures systems. Since the military effectiveness of these procedures links to them being unknown to or misunderstood by opposing commanders before they are used, stopping their use by making them reserved has the effect of helping to ensure they remain effective by making it difficult for them to be known about in advance by such opposing commanders. This prevents them being exploited or neutralized.

== See also ==
- List of established military terms
- Standard operating procedures
- Electronic warfare
- War emergency power
