= GM-1 =

World War II aircraft engine injection system

GM-1 (Göring Mischung 1) was a system for injecting nitrous oxide into aircraft engines that was used by the Luftwaffe in World War II. This increased the amount of oxygen in the fuel mixture, and thereby improved high-altitude performance. GM-1 was used on several modifications of existing fighter designs to counter the increasing performance of Allied fighters at higher altitudes.

A different system for low-altitude boost known as MW 50 was also used, although GM-1 and MW 50 were rarely used on the same engine. MW-50 injected a methanol-water mixture into the cylinders to cool the mix. Cooling causes the air to become denser, therefore allowing more air into each cylinder for a given volume. This is the same principle that intercoolers use.

GM-1 was developed in 1940 by Otto Lutz to improve high-altitude performance. It could be used by fighters, destroyers, bombers and reconnaissance aircraft, though its first use was in the Bf 109E/Z fighter. Originally, it was liquified under high pressure and stored in several high-pressure vessels until it was found that low-temperature liquefied nitrous oxide gave better performance due to improved charge cooling. It could also be stored and handled more conveniently and was less vulnerable to enemy fire.

GM-1 was typically sprayed in liquid form directly into the supercharger intake from two jets of different bore while at the same time, the fuel flow was increased to take advantage of the additional oxygen from the nitrous oxide. The jets could be operated individually or in combination, yielding three steps of power increase, for example 120/240/360 HP at different GM-1 flow rates (60, 100 and 150 grams/sec). The development of a continuously variable injection system was considered, but apparently it never saw operational use.

Initially intended as standard equipment for the Luftwaffe, in operational service it was found that GM-1 had some drawbacks. The additional weight of the equipment reduced performance on all missions, while the system was only used in the cases where the aircraft went to very high altitudes. GM-1 also became less attractive than originally imagined when in 1943, the previous trend towards ever increasing combat altitudes ended.

While GM-1 saw little use in the second half of the war, the Focke-Wulf Ta 152H, which had been developed as a dedicated high-altitude interceptor, also received a GM-1 system to provide it with superior performance at high altitude. The Ta 152H was one of the few designs to support both GM-1 and MW 50.

Similar systems have been used in racing cars and hot rods.

== See also ==
- Nitrous oxide engine

== Bibliography ==
- Douglas, Calum E. (2020). The Secret Horsepower Race: Western Front Fighter Engine Development. Horncastle, UK: Tempest Books. ISBN 978-1-911658-50-4.
