= Focke-Wulf Ta 152 =

Late-WWII German high-altitude fighter-interceptor aircraft

Ta 152
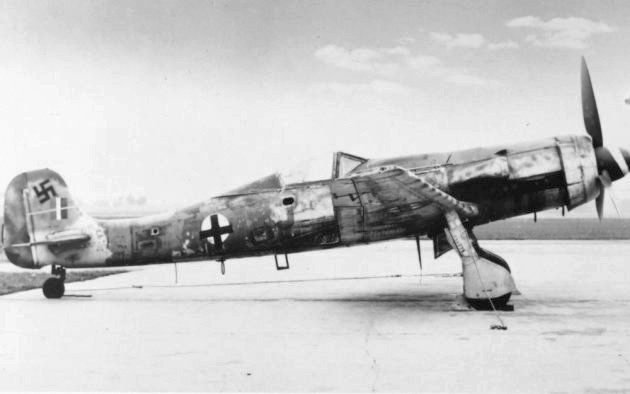
- A Ta 152H, unknown date

General information
- Type: High-altitude fighter/interceptor ('H' variants); Ground attacker ('C' variants); Aerial reconnaissance ('E' variants)
- National origin: Germany
- Manufacturer: Focke-Wulf
- Designer: Kurt Tank
- Status: Retired
- Primary user: Luftwaffe
- Number built: 69

History
- Introduction date: January 1945
- First flight: 1944
- Retired: May 1945
- Developed from: Focke-Wulf Fw 190D

The Focke-Wulf Ta 152 is a German high-altitude fighter and interceptor aircraft designed by Kurt Tank and produced by Focke-Wulf. It entered production too late and in insufficient numbers to have a significant role in the Second World War.

The Ta 152 was developed from the Focke-Wulf Fw 190 fighter. It was intended to be produced in at least three versions—the Ta 152H Höhenjäger (high-altitude fighter); the Ta 152C designed for medium-altitude operations and ground-attack, using a Daimler-Benz DB 603 and with smaller wings and the Ta 152E fighter–reconnaissance aircraft with the engine of the H model and the wing of the C model. The first Ta 152H entered service with the Luftwaffe in January 1945; one month later production of the Ta 152 ceased due to Germany's declining position in the conflict. Japan acquired material from Germany towards establishing domestic production of the Ta 152, but no aircraft are believed to have been completed.

== Development ==
=== Fw 190 ===
The Fw 190's BMW 801 engine was originally designed for bomber and transport aircraft flying at medium altitudes in the 15,000–20,000 feet (4,600–6,100 m) range. In keeping with this role it used a relatively simple single-stage supercharger that lacked performance above 20,000 feet (6,100 m) altitude. This presented a problem for fighter use, where high-altitude performance was desirable. Through careful tuning, the Fw 190 instead emerged as a powerful medium altitude design. Several experimental models of the Fw 190 with different engines were tested with improved high altitude performance, but these were not high priority projects.

Allied heavy bombers and escort fighters began flying operations at higher altitudes, around 25,000 feet (7,600 m). At these altitudes, the Fw 190 found itself at a disadvantage, which became acute during early 1944 when the long range P-51 Mustang arrived in quantity. This led to the introduction of the Fw 190D-9, mounting the Junkers Jumo 213E engine. This engine had a two-stage supercharger and much better altitude performance. The rest of the aircraft's design, especially the relatively short wings, made it difficult to fly at high altitudes. While the D-9 upgrade was expedient, it was not ideal.

=== High-altitude fighters ===
Rumours of the Boeing B-29 Superfortress, which would cruise at altitudes at which no German aircraft could comfortably operate, added impetus for a dedicated high-altitude design. The Reichsluftfahrtministerium (RLM, German Air Ministry) requested proposals from Focke-Wulf and Messerschmitt for a high-altitude interceptor. Messerschmitt responded with the Bf 109H while Focke-Wulf submitted a range of designs; the Fw 190 Raffat-1 (Ra-1) fighter would replace the existing Fw 190D series, the Ra-2 was a dedicated high altitude fighter, and the Ra-3 was a ground-attack aircraft.

These designs developed into the Fw 190 V20 (Ta 152A), V21 (Ta 152B) and V30 (Ta 152H) prototypes, all of which were based on the Fw 190D-9 but with varying degrees of improvement. The V20 used the same Jumo 213E engine as the Fw 190D-9, while the V21 used the DB 603E. Neither of these offered any significant improvement over the Fw 190D-9, and further development of the Ta 152A and B was cancelled. The V21 airframe was further modified as the V21/U1 and became the prototype for the Ta 152C.

In 1944, the RLM decided that new fighter aircraft titles must include the chief designer's name. The aircraft design was therefore given the prefix Ta.

=== Japanese version ===
During April 1945, the Imperial Japanese Army Air Service (IJAAS) acquired the licence, along with schemes and technical drawings, for manufacturing the Ta 152 in Japan. During the last stages of the conflict in Germany, with the plight of the Japanese armed forces growing ever bleaker, a large volume of the latest aviation technology Germany had to offer was given to or bought by the air wings of both the Imperial Japanese Army and Imperial Japanese Navy in the hopes that it would stem the tide of defeats and ever increasing pressure by the superior Allied air forces.

== Design ==
Kurt Tank originally designed the Ta 152 using the 44.52 litre displacement Daimler-Benz DB 603 engine as it offered better high-altitude performance, and also a greater developmental potential. The DB 603 had been used in the Fw 190C prototypes but had many problems and was considered too difficult to fit in the Ta 152 by RLM officials. With this in mind, Tank focused his efforts on the 213E as the Ta 152H engine. He insisted that the DB 603 be retained for the Ta 152C versions and as an option for later versions of the Ta 152H.

Due to the changes in the center of gravity (CoG) and balance caused by the heavier engine and the lengthened nose, the Ta 152's fuselage was extended aft by 30 cm compared to the Fw 190D-9 fuselage. Internal equipment was also relocated to correct that imbalance. The empennage was also modified with wider-chord fixed vertical tail surfaces. (especially the top half), hydraulic rather than electrically controlled undercarriage and flaps were substituted to help correcting that CoG condition. The D-9 retained the 10.51 metres (34.5 ft) wingspan of the original pre-war Fw 190 models, but this was slightly extended for the C model to 11 metres (36 ft), and greatly extended for the H model to 14.44 metres (47.4 ft), which gave it much better control at high altitudes at the cost of speed at lower altitudes.

Due to the conflict's impact on aluminium availability, the wing was built around a pair of steel spars, the front extending from just past the landing gear attachment points, and the rear spar spanning the entire wing. The wing was designed with 3° of washout, from the root to the flap–aileron junction, to prevent the ailerons from stalling before the centre section of the wing.

The Ta 152 also featured the FuG 16ZY and FuG 25a radio equipment (some aircraft were issued with FuG 125 Hermine D/F for navigation and blind landing, LGW-Siemens K 23 autopilot, and a heated armoured glass windscreen for bad-weather operations).

=== High-altitude features ===
To reach higher altitudes, a pressurized cockpit was added to the Ta 152H. The canopy was sealed by a circular tube filled with rubber foam which was inflated by a compressed air bottle, while the engine compartment was also sealed from the cockpit with a rubber foam ring. A Knorr 300/10 air compressor provided the pressure, maintaining the cockpit at 0.37 Bar (5.29 psi) above 8,000 m (26,000 ft). To prevent fogging, the windscreen was of a double-glazed style with a 6 mm (0.24 in) thick outer pane and a 3 mm (0.12 in) inner pane with a 6 mm (0.24 in) gap. The gap was fitted with several silica gel capsules to absorb any moisture forming between the panes. The cockpit was not pressurized in the Ta 152C.

=== Armament ===
The Ta 152H had heavy armament to allow it to quickly deal with enemy aircraft. It had a 30 mm (1.2 in) MK 108 Motorkanone in the propeller hub and two 20 mm (0.79 in) MG 151/20 cannon, synchronised to fire through the propeller, in the wing roots. The C model was designed to operate at lower altitudes than the H-model with the same armament plus two more MG 151/20 cannon synchronised as the additional autocannon for the C-model were mounted just ahead of the windscreen and above the engine's upper rear crank case. The Ta 152C could destroy the heaviest enemy bombers with a short burst but the added weight decreased speed and rate of turn.

=== Performance ===
The Ta 152H-1 was among the fastest piston-engined fighters of the war, with a top speed comparable to the twin-engined Dornier Do 335. It was capable of 755 km/h (469 mph) at 13,500 m (44,300 ft) using the GM-1 nitrous oxide boost and 560 km/h (350 mph) at sea level using the MW 50 methanol-water boost. It used the MW 50 system mainly for altitudes up to about 10,000 m (33,000 ft) and the GM-1 system for higher altitudes, although both systems could be engaged at the same time. Kurt Tank was flying an unarmed Ta 152H in late 1944 to a meeting at the Focke-Wulf plant in Cottbus when ground controllers warned him of two P-51 Mustangs. The enemy aircraft appeared behind Tank but he escaped by applying full power and engaging the MW 50 boost "until they were no more than two dots on the horizon".

== Operational history ==
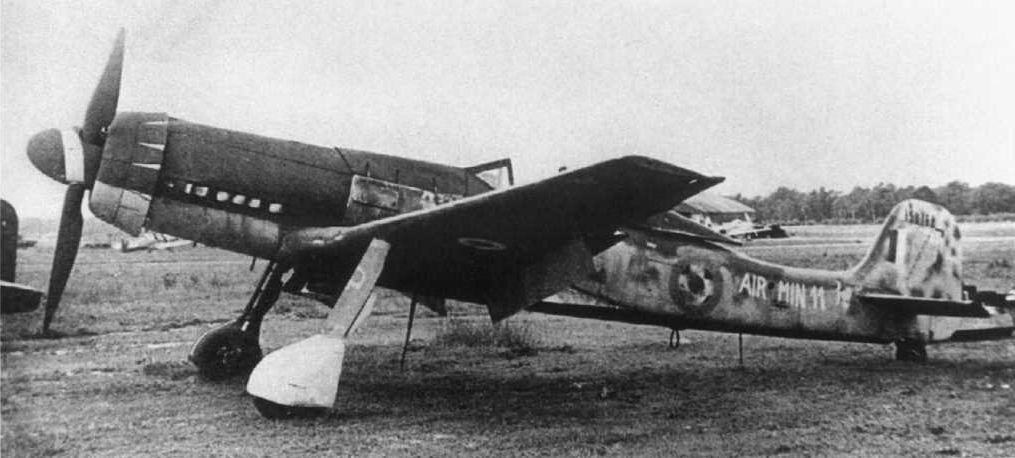
A British-captured Ta 152 H-1, "Werknummer 150168", 1946. The greatly extended wing is clearly evident in this image.

By October 1944, given the disastrous course of the conflict, RLM realised the urgency of Germany's situation and pushed Focke-Wulf to quickly put the Ta 152 into production. As a result, several Ta 152 prototypes crashed early into the test program. It was found that critical systems were lacking sufficient quality control. Problems arose with superchargers, pressurised cockpits leaked, the engine cooling system was unreliable at best due in part to unreliable oil temperature monitoring and in several instances the landing gear failed to properly retract. A total of up to 20 pre-production Ta 152 H-0s were delivered from November 1944 to Erprobungskommando Ta 152 to service test the aircraft. It was reported that test pilots were able to conduct a mere 31 hours of flight tests before full production started. By the end of January 1945, only 50 hours or so had been completed.

III./Jagdgeschwader 301, initially a Luftwaffe Wilde Sau unit, was ordered to convert to the type in January 1945, which it did (and flew them operationally for a short time). In the end, Ta 152s were pooled in a special Stabstaffel JG 301, first based at Alteno Air Base near Luckau, then at Neustadt-Glewe in Mecklenburg. The Stabstaffel never had more than 15 Ta 152Hs, H-0s and H-1s. Since the usual transfer system had broken down, replacement parts became nearly impossible to obtain.

An early Ta 152 combat occurred on 14 April 1945 when Oberfeldwebel Willi Reschke tried to intercept a De Havilland Mosquito over Stendal but failed to catch up due to engine trouble. On the evening of that same day, Reschke was to demonstrate that the Ta 152H could be used as a low altitude fighter. A section of four Hawker Tempest Vs of 486 (NZ) Squadron were out on patrol. After attacking a train near Ludwigslust, the section split up into pairs; Wing Commander Brooker ordered the Tempests flown by Flying Officer S. J. Short and Warrant Officer Owen J. Mitchell to make their own way back to base. On the way back, this pair, which was strafing targets along the railway tracks near Ludwigslust, was spotted by lookouts posted at Neustadt-Glewe. Three Ta 152s – flown by Reschke, Oberstleutnant Aufhammer and Oberfeldwebel Sepp Sattler – were scrambled, catching the Tempests by surprise. Reschke recalled,

As the direction of take-off was in line with the railway tracks leading straight to Ludwigslust, we were almost immediately in contact with the enemy fighters, which turned out to be Tempests. Flying in No 3 position I witnessed Oberfeldwebel Sattler ahead of me dive into the ground seconds before we reached them. It was hardly possible for his crash to have been the result of enemy action, as the two Tempest pilots had clearly only just registered our presence. So now it was two against two as the ground-level dogfight began. We knew the Tempest to be a very fast fighter, used by the British to chase and shoot down our V-1s. But here, in a fight, which was never to climb above 50 metres, speed would not play a big part. The machines' ability to turn would be all important. Both pilots realised from the start that it would be a fight to the finish and used every flying trick and tactical ploy possible to try to gain the upper hand. At this altitude, neither could afford to make the slightest mistake. And for the first time since flying the Ta 152 I began to fully appreciate exactly what this aircraft could do.

Pulling ever tighter turns I got closer and closer to the Tempest, never once feeling I was even approached the limit of the Ta's capabilities. And in order to keep out of my sights, the Tempest pilot was being forced to take increasingly dangerous evasive action. When he flicked over onto the opposite wing I knew his last attempt to turn inside me had failed. The first burst of fire from my Ta 152 caught the Tempest in the tail and rear fuselage. The enemy aircraft shuddered noticeably and, probably as an instinctive reaction, the Tempest pilot immediately yoked into a starboard turn, giving me an even greater advantage.

Now there was no escape for the Tempest. I pressed my gun buttons a second time, but after a few rounds my weapons fell silent, and despite all my efforts to clear them, refused to fire another shot. I can no longer remember just who and what I didn't curse. But fortunately the Tempest pilot didn't realise my predicament as he'd already taken hits. Instead, he continued desperately to twist and turn and I positioned myself so that I was always just within his field of vision. Eventually – inevitably – he stalled. The Tempest's left wing dropped and he crashed into the woods immediately below us.

It so happened that the site of Oberfeldwebel Sattler's crash, and that of the Tempest pilot, who proved to be New Zealander Warrant Officer Owen J. Mitchell, were only about one kilometre apart.

It is assumed that Sattler was shot down either by Sid Short or Bill Shaw of 486 Sqn, who claimed a Bf 109 E in the same area. Operational missions were flown in April 1945 from Neustadt, mostly escorting close support aircraft to the Battle of Berlin. Reschke claimed two Yakovlev Yak-9s near Berlin on 24 April, while Obfw. Walter Loos, claimed four air victories on 24, 25 and 30 April.

The Ta 152 score at the end of the war was probably seven victories and four losses in air combat, although a degree of uncertainty about those numbers exists. Four victories were achieved by Josef Keil, from 1 March 1945 to 21 April 1945, and at least three victories were achieved by Willi Reschke. The Ta 152 was delivered to JG 301 on 27 January 1945 and the first Ta 152 mission against American bombers took place on 2 March 1945. There was no contact with the Americans because the 12 Ta 152s were forced to fend off repeated attacks by the Bf 109s of another German unit, as the shape of the Ta-152 was virtually unknown to other Jagdgeschwader. There were no losses, as the climbing ability and manoeuvrability of the Ta 152s enabled them to evade these attacks. The four losses in air combat were: Hptm. Hermann Stahl, killed on 11 April 1945; Obfw. Sepp Sattler, killed on 14 April 1945; two unknown JG11 pilots downed by Spitfires in the last days of April 1945, during transfer from Neustadt-Glewe to Leck airfield.

== Production ==
The aviation historian Malcolm Lowe noted:

Although it is possible that the Ta 152C and Ta 152E might have entered limited production late in the war or at least had components ready for assembly, the version of Ta 152 that was definitely series produced was the high-altitude Ta 152H, as summarised below. However, there are still many gaps in our knowledge of exactly how many Ta 152H production aircraft were made, and what planned Werk Nummer blocks were. Production could have commenced very late in the war of the Ta 152C by ATG at Leipzig, and by Siebel at Schkeuditz between Leipzig and Halle. Similarly the dedicated reconnaissance Ta 152E might have commenced production by MMW at Erfurt-Nord, with production there later switching to the Ta 152C, but considerable mystery still surrounds these programmes in the last weeks of the war.

The total number of Ta 152s produced is unknown. According to the aviation historian Chris McNab, the first production examples of the Ta 152H commenced delivery during November 1944 and, by the time the factory was abandoned in early 1945, 150 examples had been delivered to the Luftwaffe and that the majority of these aircraft were issued to JG 301. Allegedly, production of the Ta 152 had abruptly ceased by February 1945. However, according to Peter Rodeike, 44 Ta 152 H-0/V and 25 Ta 152 H-1 were completed.

== Variants ==
Ta 152 C-0
Pre-production aircraft, one prototype built powered with 2,100-hp (1566 kW) Daimler Benz DB603LA engine. The extra length of this engine, as with the Jumo 213-powered Fw 190D-9, required a compensating rear fuselage plug and enlarged tail surfaces, and wing span was increased to 36 ft 1 in (11 meters). All "C" variants were intended for low to medium-altitude operations.
Ta 152 C-1
Standard wing (11.00 m (36 ft 1 in)), armed with one engine-mounted Motorkanone 30 mm (1.18 in) MK 108 cannon and four 20 mm synchronized MG 151/20 cannons (two above the engine, two in the wing roots).
Ta 152 C-2
Standard wing (11.00 m (36 ft 1 in)), equipped with an improved radio.
Ta 152 C-3
Standard wing (11.00 m (36 ft 1 in)), armed with one engine-mounted Motorkanone 30 mm (1.18 in) MK 103 cannon and four 20 mm synchronized MG 151/20 cannons (two above the engine, two in the wing roots).
Ta 152 E-1
Photographic reconnaissance version of the Ta 152C, with standard wing (11.00 m (36 ft 1 in)).
Ta 152 E-2
High-altitude photographic reconnaissance version, powered by a Junkers Jumo 213E engine and with the H-series wing (14.44 m (48 ft 6 in)). Only a single prototype was completed.
Ta 152 H-0
20 pre-production aircraft, H-series wing (14.44 m (48 ft 6 in)). All "H" variants were intended for medium to high altitude operations.
Ta 152 H-1
The only production version. H-series wing (14.44 m (48 ft 6 in)), armed with one engine-mounted Motorkanone 30 mm (1.18 in) MK108 cannon and two 20 mm synchronized MG 151/20 cannons in the wing roots, additional fuel tanks located in the wings.

== Surviving aircraft ==
Only one Ta 152 survives, a 152 H-0 variant flown by III./Jagdgeschwader 301, a Luftwaffe Wilde Sau unit. The aircraft is housed at the National Air and Space Museum Paul E. Garber Preservation, Restoration, and Storage Facility in Suitland, Maryland, United States, where it is expected to be restored.

The aircraft is believed to be Werk-Nummer (serial number) 150020, which was a pre-production H-0 model transitioning to full production Ta 152H-1 series aircraft. It was probably built at Focke-Wulf's production facility at Cottbus, Germany, in December 1944, and delivered to Erprobungskommando Ta 152 at Rechlin, Germany, for service testing.

== Operators ==
Nazi Germany

- Luftwaffe

== Specifications (Ta 152 H-1) ==

Data from Aircraft of the Third Reich: Volume One

General characteristics

- Crew: one
- Length: 10.82 m (35 ft 6 in)
- Wingspan: 14.44 m (47 ft 5 in)
- Height: 3.36 m (11 ft 0 in)
- Wing area: 23.5 m^{2} (253 sq ft)
- Airfoil: root: NACA 23015.3; tip: NACA 23009
- Empty weight: 3,877 kg (8,547 lb)
- Gross weight: 5,217 kg (11,502 lb)
- Max takeoff weight: 5,217 kg (11,502 lb)
- Fuel capacity: 992 L (262 US gal; 218 imp gal)
- Powerplant: 1 × Junkers Jumo 213E or Junkers Jumo 213E-1 V-12 inverted liquid-cooled piston engine, 1,287 kW (1,726 hp) for take-off

1,530 kW (2,050 hp) for take-off with MW-50 water/methanol injection
940 kW (1,260 hp) at 10,700 m (35,100 ft) with GM-1 Nitrous Oxide injection

- Propellers: 3-bladed Junkers VS-9 constant-speed propeller

Performance

- Maximum speed: 580 km/h (360 mph, 310 kn) at sea level with MW-50 boost

759 km/h (472 mph; 410 kn) at 12,500 m (41,000 ft) with GM-1 boost

- Range: 2,000 km (1,200 mi, 1,100 nmi)
- Service ceiling: 15,100 m (49,500 ft) with GM-1 boost
- Rate of climb: 20 m/s (3,900 ft/min) at maximum weight of 5,217 kg (11,502 lb)

25.4 m/s (83 ft/s) at 4,727 kg (10,421 lb)

- Time to altitude: 10,000 m (33,000 ft) in ten minutes and six seconds
- Wing loading: 196.8 kg/m^{2} (40.3 lb/sq ft)
- Power/mass: 0.276 kW/kg (0.168 hp/lb)

Armament

- 1 × 30 mm (1.181 in) MK 108 cannon 85 rds
- 2 × 20 mm (0.787 in) MG 151/20 cannon 350 rds

== See also ==
Related development

- Focke-Wulf Fw 190

Aircraft of comparable role, configuration, and era

- Blohm & Voss BV 155
- CAC CA-15
- Fiat G.56
- Fisher P-75 Eagle
- Lavochkin La-9
- Nakajima Ki-87
- Martin-Baker MB 5
- Messerschmitt Me 509
- Mikoyan-Gurevich I-220
- North American P-51H
- Republic XP-72
- Supermarine Spiteful
- Hawker Tempest

Related lists

- List of military aircraft of Germany
