= Water injection (engine) =

Means of cooling parts of an engine to allow more power

In internal combustion engines, water injection, also known as anti-detonant injection (ADI), can spray water into the incoming air or air–fuel mixture, or directly into the combustion chamber to cool certain parts of the induction system where "hot points" could produce premature ignition. In jet engines—particularly early turbojets or engines in which it is not practical or desirable to have an afterburner—water injection may be used to increase engine thrust, particularly at low altitudes and at takeoff.

Water injection was used historically to increase the power output of military aviation engines for short durations, such as during aerial combat or takeoff. It has also been used in motor sports and notably in drag racing. In Otto cycle engines, the cooling effect of water injection enables greater compression ratios by reducing engine knocking (detonation), which allows significant performance gains when used in conjunction with a supercharger, turbocharger, or modifications such as aggressive ignition timing. Depending on the engine, improvements in power and fuel efficiency can also be obtained solely by injecting water. Water injection may also be used to reduce NO_{x} or carbon monoxide emissions.

== Composition of fluid ==
Many water injection systems use a mixture of water and alcohol (often close to 50-50), with trace amounts of water-miscible oil. The high heat capacity of water provides the primary cooling effect. The alcohol is combustible and also serves as an antifreeze for the water. The main purpose of the oil is to prevent corrosion of water injection and fuel system components.

== Use in aircraft ==
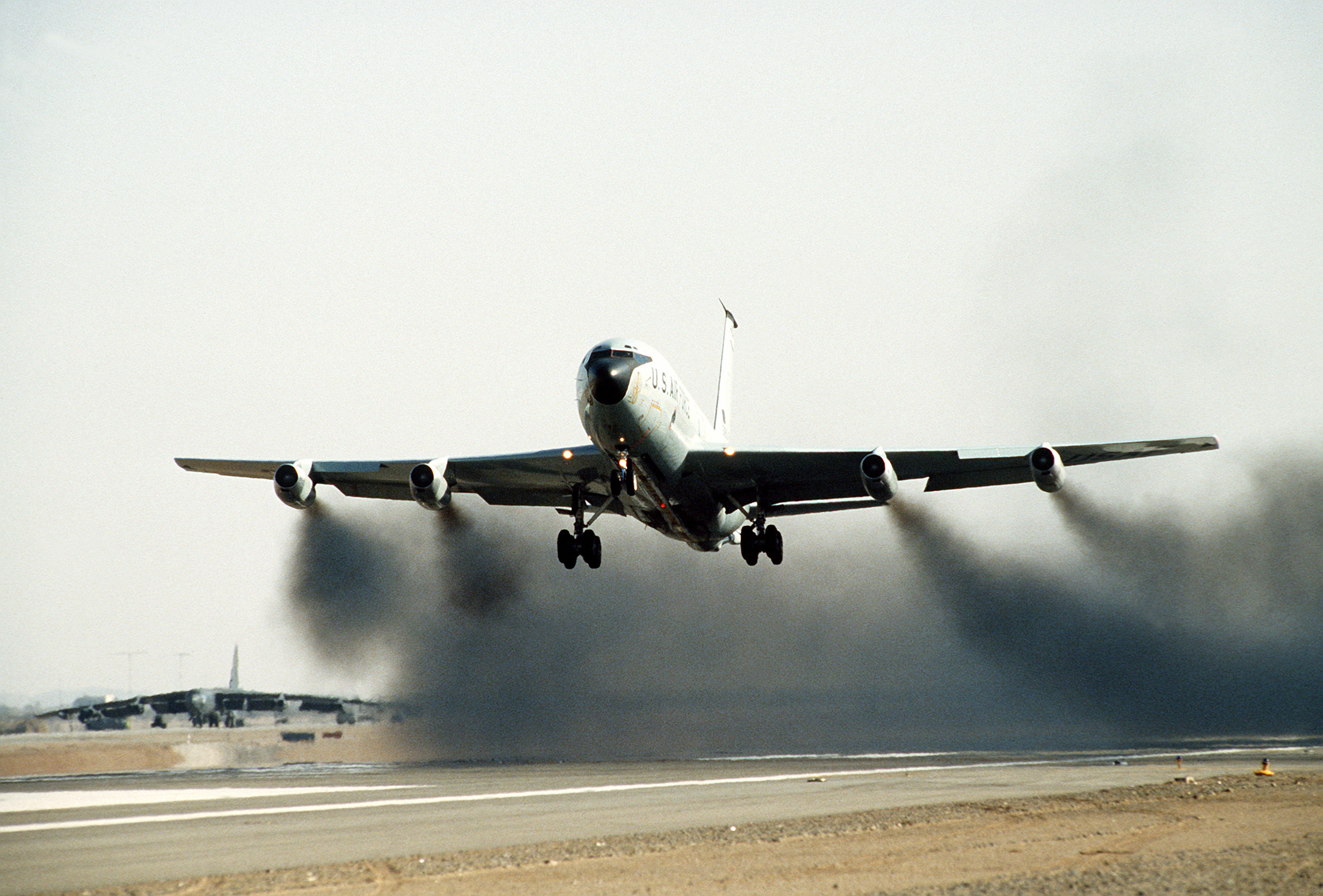
A "wet" takeoff of a KC-135 with J57 engines

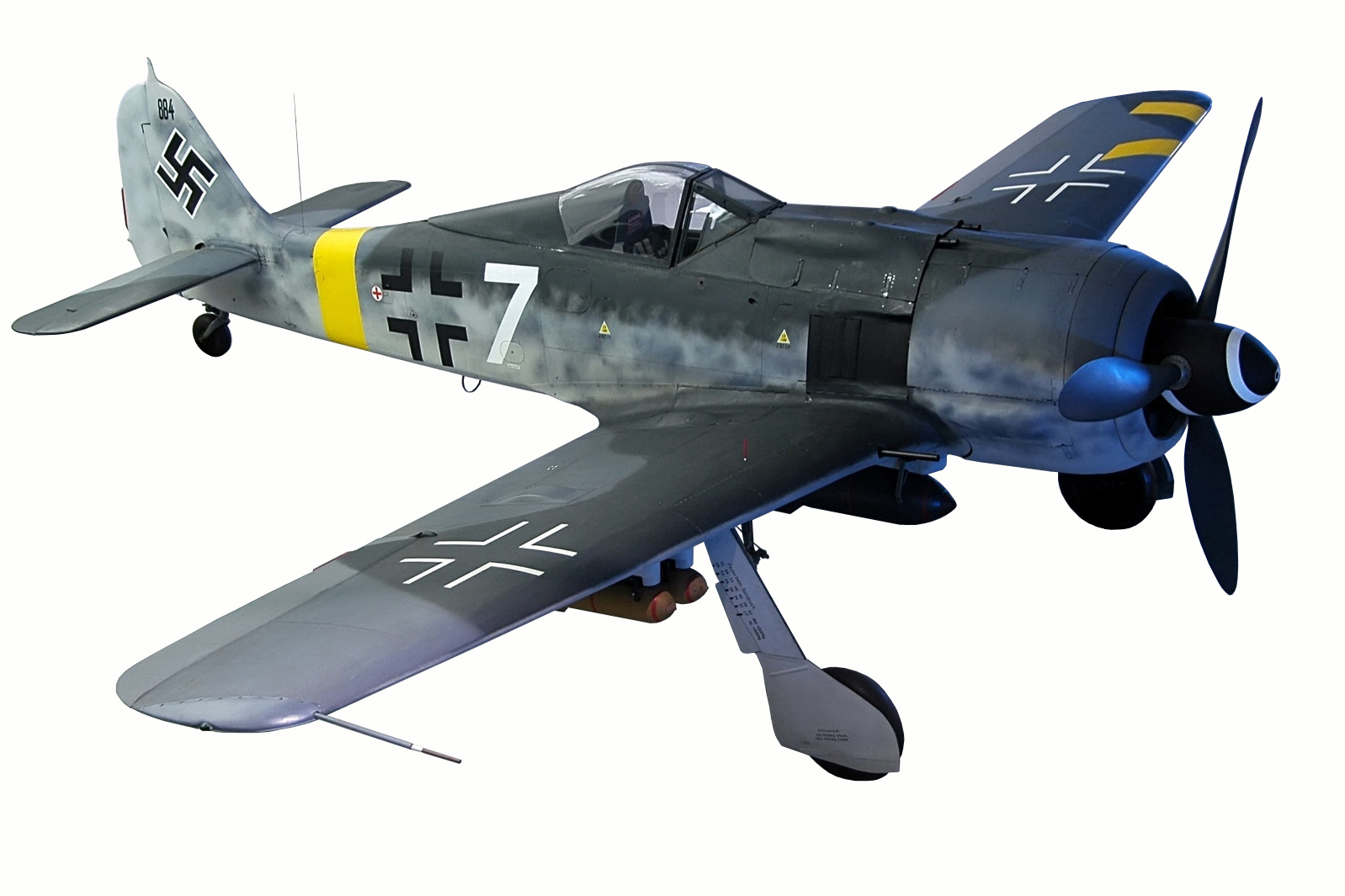
FW 190 with BMW 801 engine getting up to 110 kW (150 hp) extra from water injection mixture

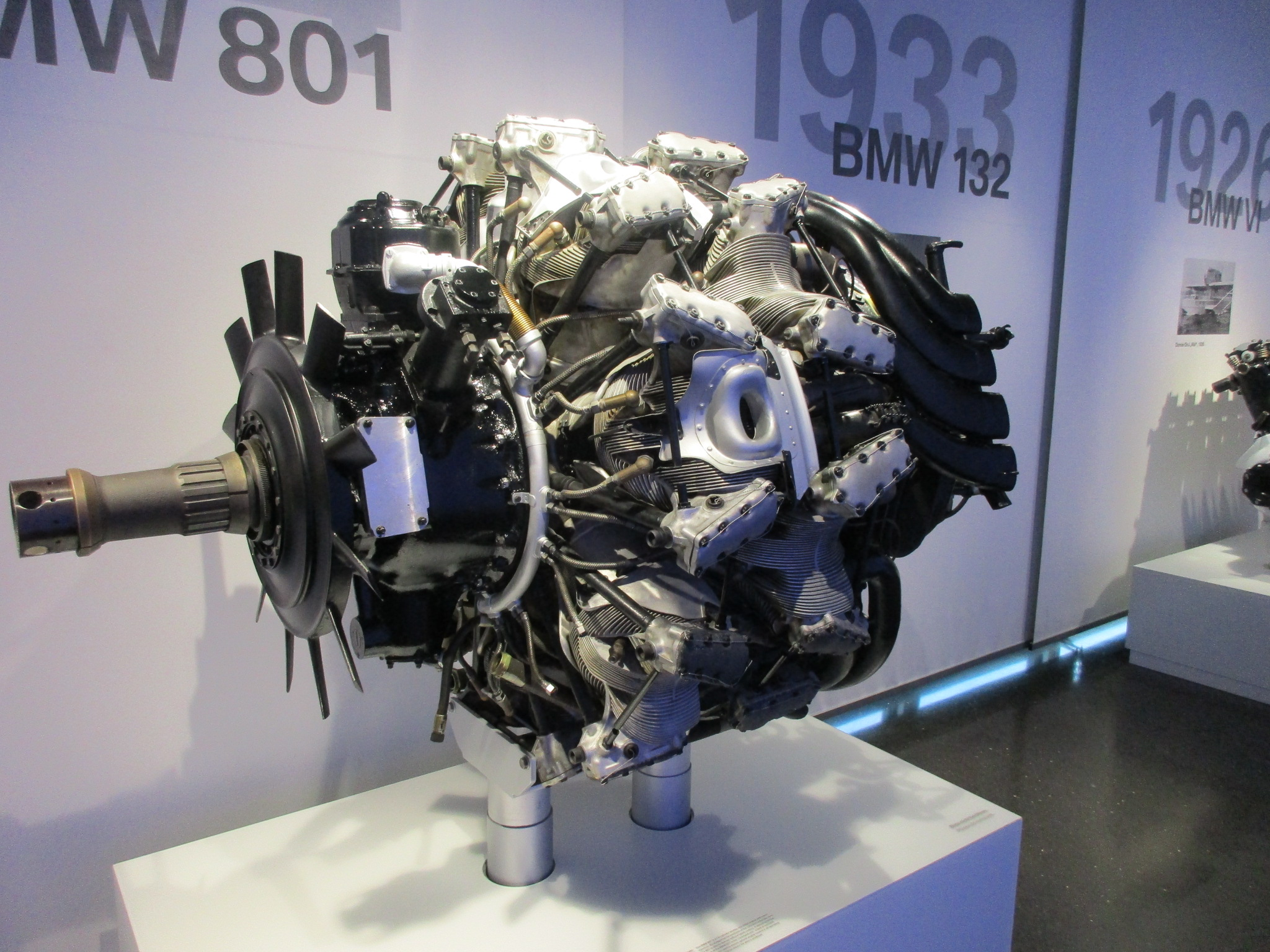
BMW 801 aircraft engine at the BMW Museum

Water injection has been used in both reciprocating and turbine aircraft engines. In a reciprocating engine, the use of water injection, also called anti-detonation injection or ADI, is used to prevent engine knocking also known as "detonation". Commonly found on large radial engines with pressure carburetors, it is a mixture of water and alcohol injected into the carburetor at high power settings. When using a rich mixture, the engine runs cooler but cannot reach maximum power, and a leaner mixture means detonation is likely. With the use of ADI, the injected water and alcohol absorb the excess heat to prevent detonation while still allowing for a leaner and more powerful mixture. Notable engines with water fuel injection include BMW 801, Daimler-Benz DB 605, Junkers Jumo 213, Pratt & Whitney R-2800 Double Wasp.

When used in a turbine engine, the effects are similar, except that preventing detonation is normally not the primary goal. Water is normally injected either at the compressor inlet or in the diffuser just before the combustion chamber. Adding water increases the mass being accelerated out of the engine, increasing thrust; and it also serves to cool the turbines. Since temperature is normally the limiting factor in turbine engine performance at low altitudes, the cooling effect lets the engine run at higher RPM with more fuel injected and more thrust created without overheating.

Prior to the widespread adoption of afterburning engines, some first-generation jet fighters used water injection to provide a moderate boost in performance. For example, the late-model variant of the Lockheed F-80 Shooting Star, the F-80C, used water injection on its Allison J33-A-35 engine. Water injection increased thrust from 20.5 to 24.0 kN (4,600 to 5,400 lbf), a 17% thrust increase (at sea level).

Early versions of the Boeing 707 fitted with Pratt & Whitney JT3C turbojets used water injection for extra takeoff power, as did Boeing 747-100 and 200 aircraft fitted with Pratt & Whitney JT9D-3AW and -7AW turbofans; this system was not included in later versions fitted with more powerful engines. The BAC One-Eleven airliner used water injection for its Rolls-Royce Spey turbofan engines. Filling the tanks with jet fuel instead of water led to the 1971 Paninternational Flight 112 crash. In 1978, Olympic Airways Flight 411 had to abort and return to its take-off airport due to a failure of the water injection system or its processes.

== Use in automobiles ==
A limited number of road vehicles with forced induction engines from manufacturers such as Chrysler have included water injection. The 1962 Oldsmobile Jetfire was delivered with the Turbo Jetfire engine.

=== Saab ===
Saab used water injection in the 1978 Saab 99 Turbo S for an extra 15–20 hp (11–15 kW) on its 2-litre engine and in the 1980 Saab 900 Enduro.

=== BMW ===
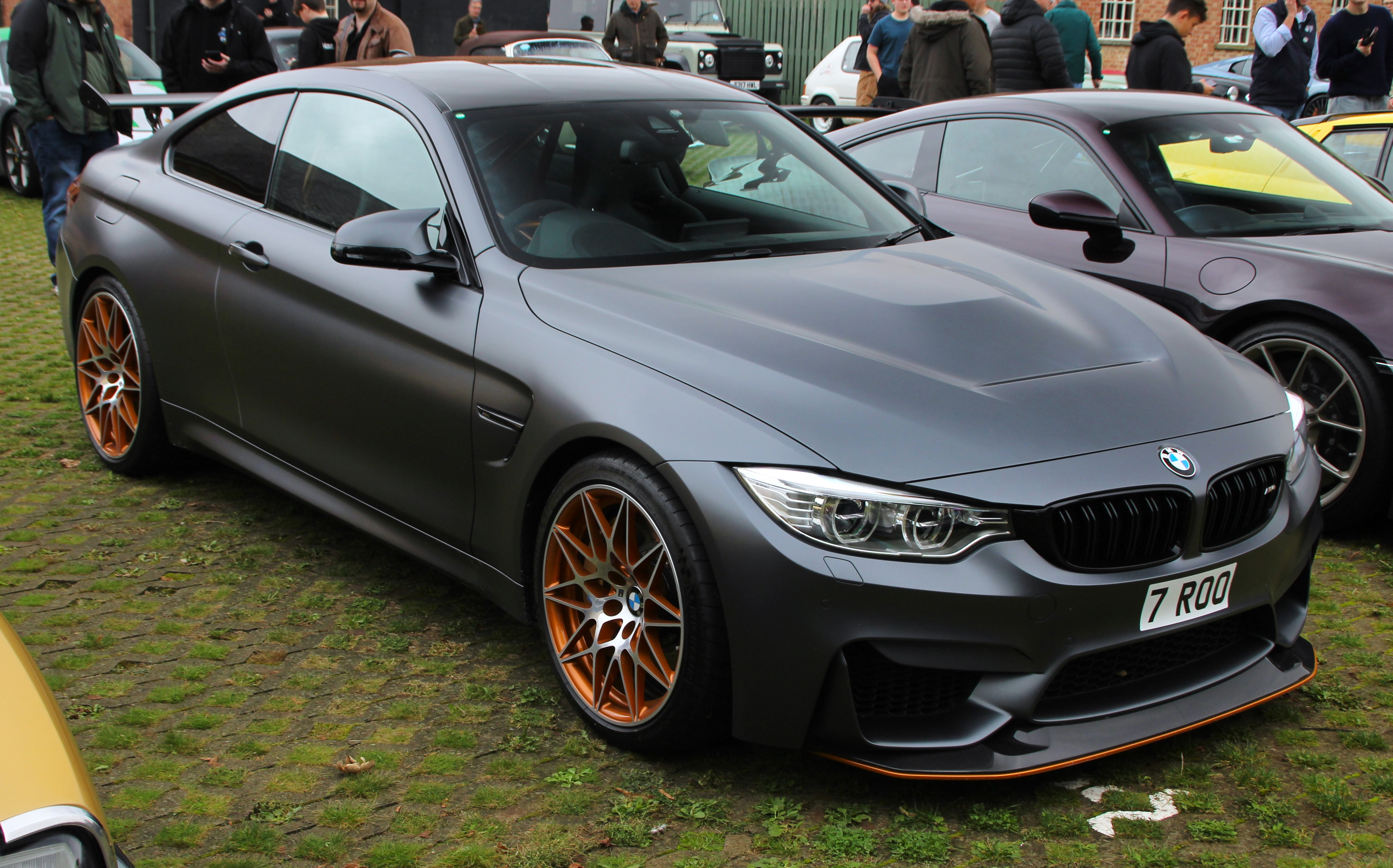
2016 BMW M4 GTS

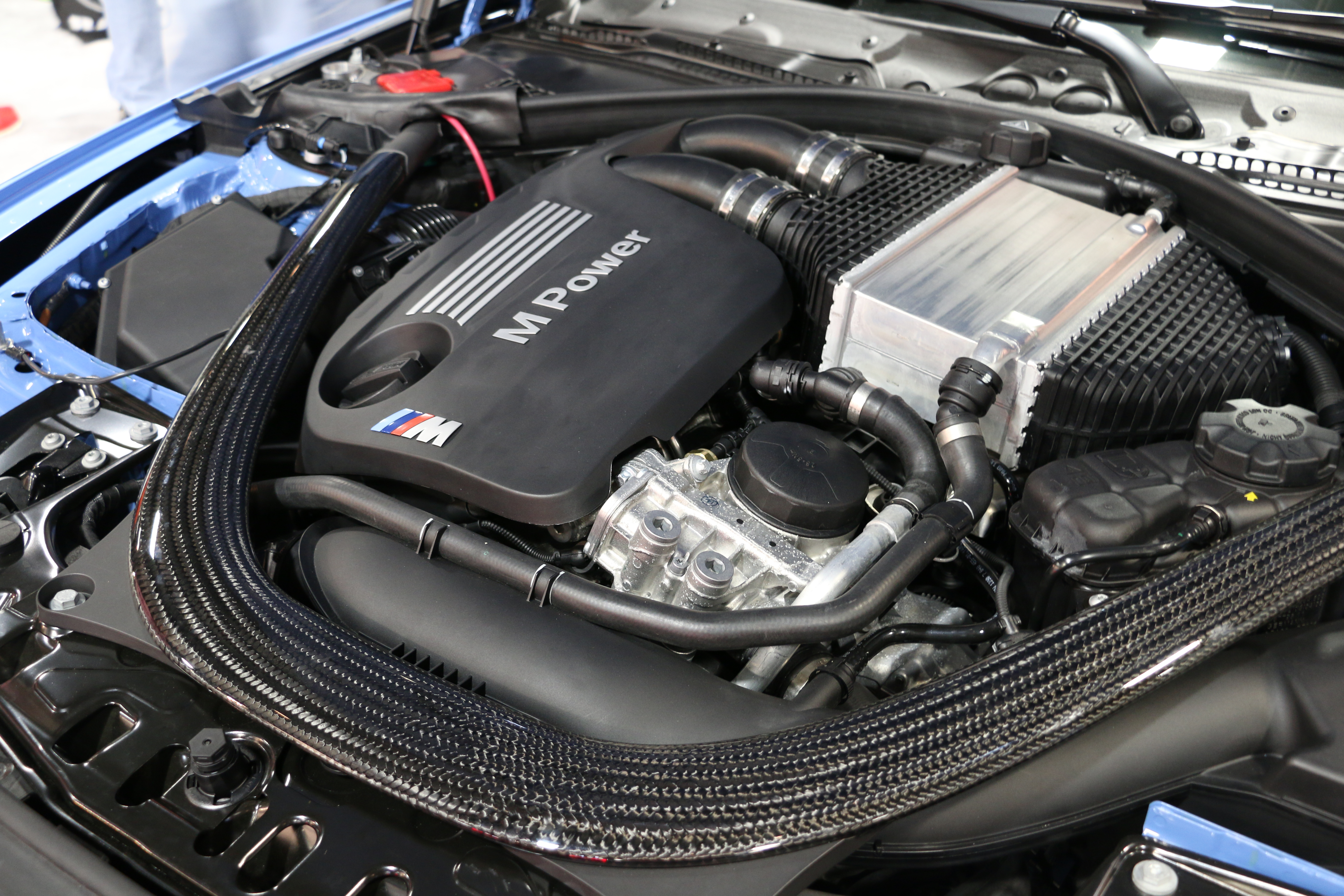
BMW M N55 serial engine

In 2015, BMW introduced a version of their high performance coupe, the BMW M4 GTS with the straight-6 2,979 cc turbocharged BMW S55 engine, that combined water injection with intercooling. With the aid of the system, BMW stated that the GTS got a 37 kW (50 hp) boost, increasing power to 368 kW (493 hp) and torque to 600 N⋅m (443 lb⋅ft). Three water injectors were used to allow boost pressure to be increased from 17.2 to 21.6 psi (1.19 to 1.49 bar) over the N55 engine that it was based on.

BMW had previously used water injection on its BMW 801 aircraft engine using the MW-50 methanol-water system for low altitude boost with the addition of GM-1 nitrous oxide system for high altitude performance. The BMW M4 GTS was featured in the 2015 MotoGP season as the official safety car for the series and was released for the commercial market in 2016. By the mid 2020s, engine development was shifted focus also on improved fuel consumption, due to the pressure on CO_{2} emissions reduction and related regulations.

=== Bosch ===
Co-developed with BMW, Bosch offers water injection systems named WaterBoost for all manufacturers. Bosch has a heritage of water injection with BMW as early as 1942. First appeared in the BMW 801D in 1942, it never went into production because the cylinder heads developed micro-cracks when MW50 was used. Instead, the Daimler-Benz DB 605 engined later versions of the Messerschmitt Bf 109 were fitted with an MW 50 injection system, beginning in early 1944. Today Bosch claims up to 5% increase in engine performance, up to 4% decrease in CO_{2} emissions and up to 13% improvement in fuel economy.

Water injection and cooled exhaust gas recirculation (EGR) could be seen as competitive technologies. It has been demonstrated that at medium load, a 40-50 % water-to-fuel ratio with port water injection has the same effect as an EGR-rate of 10%, which is seen as relatively limited, even for petrol engines.

=== On-board water generation ===
Surveys asking customers about their willingness to regularly fill up an additional operating fluid have demonstrated that the acceptance level is limited. Therefore, the need for refilling is considered as one of the main barrier for the mass adoption of water injection. A key enabler is the development of on-board water generation system to run in a closed loop system, especially in order to guarantee consistent low level of emissions (engine CO_{2} emissions will be raised if the water supply is exhausted). Three major sources can be investigated:

- Harvesting air humidity from ambient (e.g. by A/C condensate)
- Surface water (e.g. rain water collected from vehicle body)
- Exhaust gas condensate

The first two variants are highly dependent on weather ambient conditions with sufficiently high humidity levels or driver habits (no A/C operation wanted). Consequently, an adequate supply of water cannot be ensured. In contrast, condensing of water vapour formed during the combustion of petrol is a reliable source of water: there is approximately 1 litre of water vapour in exhaust per each litre of petrol consumed. In October 2019, Hanon Systems together with FEV presented an Audi TT Sport demonstrator equipped with water injection operating as a closed system thanks to a Hanon Systems "Water Harvesting System".

== Use in diesel ==
A 2016 study combined water injection with exhaust gas recirculation. Water was injected into the exhaust manifold of a diesel engine and, by opening the exhaust valve during the induction stroke, the injected water and some of the exhaust gas was drawn back into the cylinder. The effect was up to 85% reduction in NO_{x} emissions and also significant reduction in soot emissions.

== See also ==
- Crower six stroke
