= Junkers Jumo 213 =

WW2 aircraft engine

Jumo 213
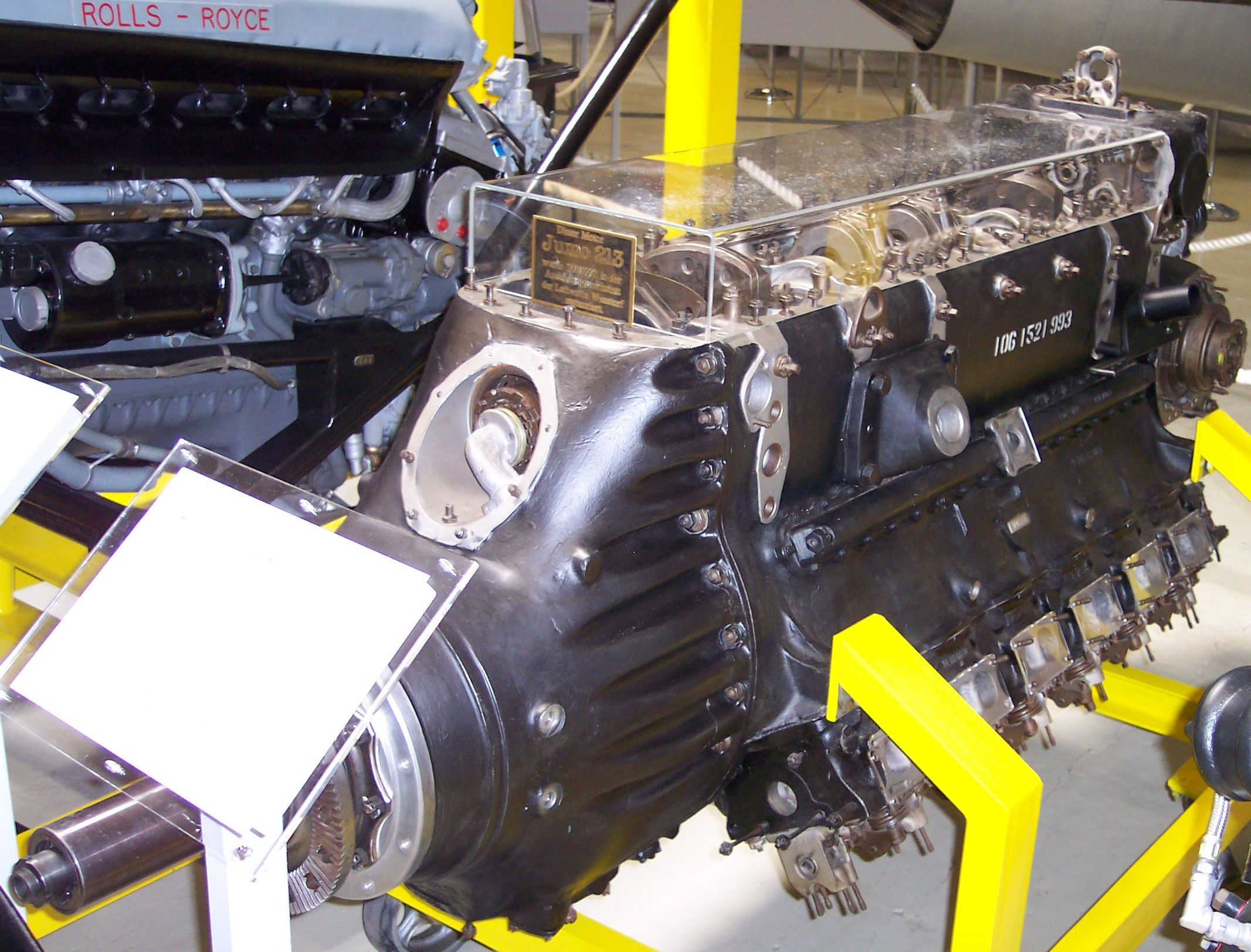
- Junkers Jumo 213
- Type: Piston inverted V12 aero-engine
- Manufacturer: Junkers
- First run: 1940
- Major applications: Focke-Wulf Fw 190D; Focke-Wulf Ta 152; Junkers Ju 188
- Number built: 9,000
- Developed from: Jumo 211

The Junkers Jumo 213 was a World War II–era V12 liquid-cooled aircraft engine, a development of Junkers Motoren's earlier design, the Jumo 211. The design added two features, a pressurized cooling system that required considerably less cooling fluid which allowed the engine to be built smaller and lighter, and a number of improvements that allowed it to run at higher RPM. These changes boosted power by over 500 hp and made the 213 one of the most sought-after Axis engine designs in the late-war era.

== Design and development ==
When the Jumo 211 entered production in the late 1930s it used an unpressurized liquid cooling system based on an "open cycle". Water was pumped through the engine to keep it cool, but the system operated at atmospheric pressure, or only slightly higher. Since the boiling point of water decreases with altitude (pressure) this meant that the temperature of the cooling water had to be kept quite low to avoid boiling at high altitudes, which in turn meant that the water removed less heat from the engine before flowing into the radiator to cool it.

By contrast, the 1940 Daimler-Benz DB 601E used a pressurized coolant system that ran at the same pressure regardless of altitude, raising the boiling point to about 110 °C. This allowed it to use considerably less water for the same cooling effect, which remained the same at all altitudes. Although otherwise similar to the Jumo 211 in most respects, the 601 was smaller and lighter than the 211, and could be run at higher power settings at higher altitudes, making it popular in fighter designs. The 211 was relegated to "secondary" roles in bombers and transports.

The Junkers Motorenwerke firm was not happy with this state of affairs, and started its own efforts to produce a pressurized cooling system as early as 1938. Experiments on the 211 proved so successful that it became clear that not only could the engine be built smaller and lighter (by reducing the water requirement), but could be run at higher power settings without overheating. Additional changes to strengthen the crankshaft and add a fully shrouded supercharger for increased boost resulted in the Jumo 211F model, which delivered 1,340 PS (1,322 hp, 986 kW) at 2,600 RPM, up from 1000 PS at 2,200 RPM in the first version 211A.

=== 213A ===
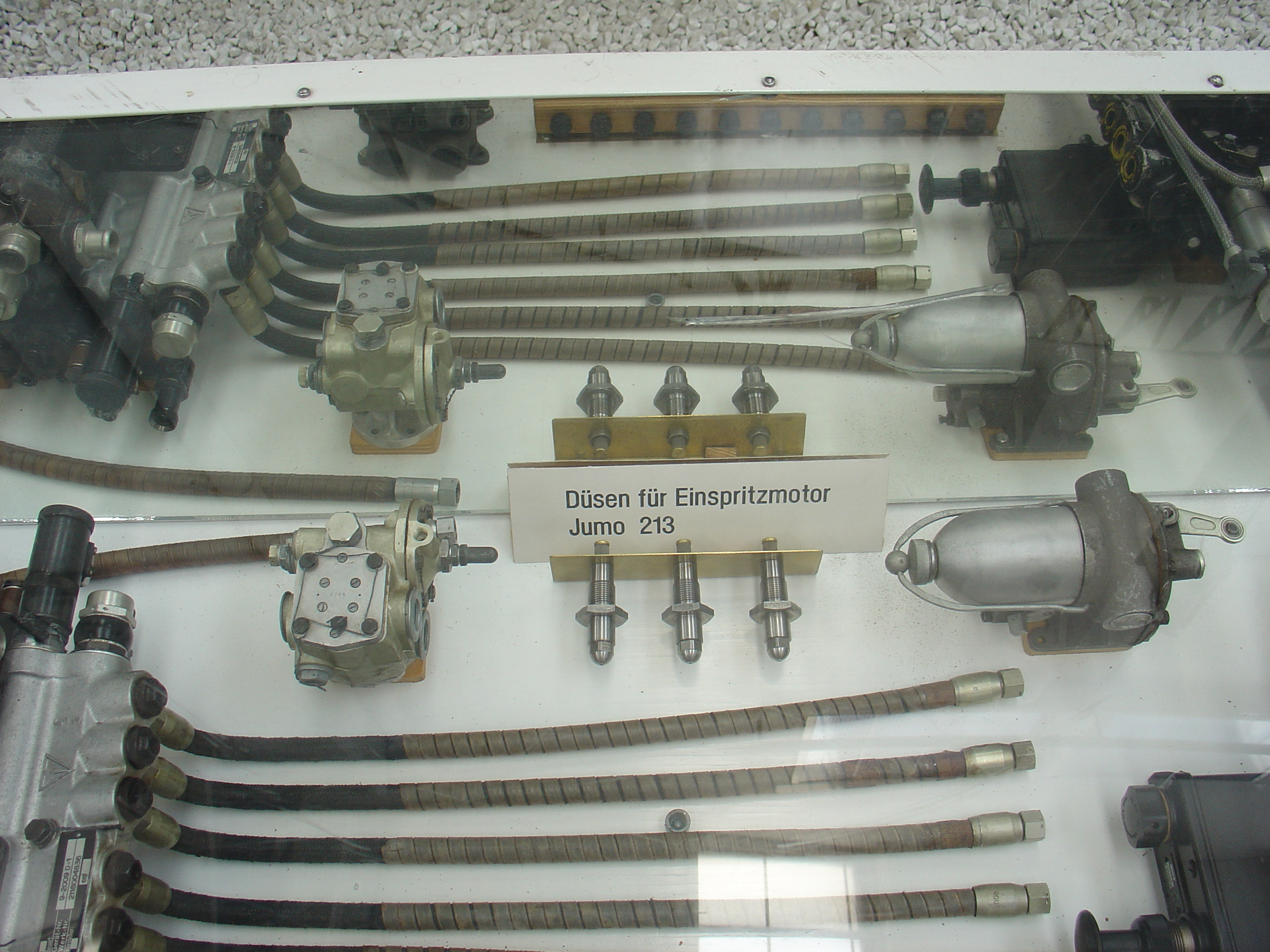
Jumo 213 fuel injector system components in the Technikmuseum Speyer

After redesigning the engine block to a smaller external size to suit the increased cooling power – while keeping the same 150 mm x 165 mm bore/stroke figures, maintaining the 35 litre displacement of the Jumo 211 series – and then further increasing boost settings on the supercharger, the resulting 213A model was able to deliver 1,750 PS (metric hp) at 3,250 RPM. This made it considerably more powerful than the corresponding DB 601E which provided 1,350 PS, and about the same power as the much larger DB 603 of 44.52 litre displacement. Junkers decided to go after the 603's market, and placed the 213's mounting points and fluid connections in the same locations as the 603, allowing it to be "dropped in" as a replacement, with the exception of the Jumo's standard starboard-side supercharger intake (Daimler-Benz inverted V12 engines always had the supercharger intakes on the port side).

The 213A (the main production series, with single-stage two-speed supercharging) first ran in 1940, but experienced lengthy delays before finally being declared "production quality" in 1943. Production was extremely slow to ramp up, in order to avoid delays in the existing Jumo 211 production. By the time the engines were available in any sort of number in 1944, Allied bombing repeatedly destroyed the production lines. Production of the A model was limited to about 400–500 a month for most of 1944/45.

=== Advanced versions ===
A range of advanced versions were also developed during the lengthy teething period. The 213B was designed to run on 100 octane "C3" fuel, allowing the boost pressure to be increased and the take-off power improved to 2,000 PS. The 213C was essentially an A model with re-arranged secondary equipment (supercharger, oil pump, etc.) to allow a Motorkanone cannon to fire through the propeller shaft. The 213D added a new three-speed supercharger for smoother power curves and improved altitude performance, but though flight test models were produced it did not enter production.

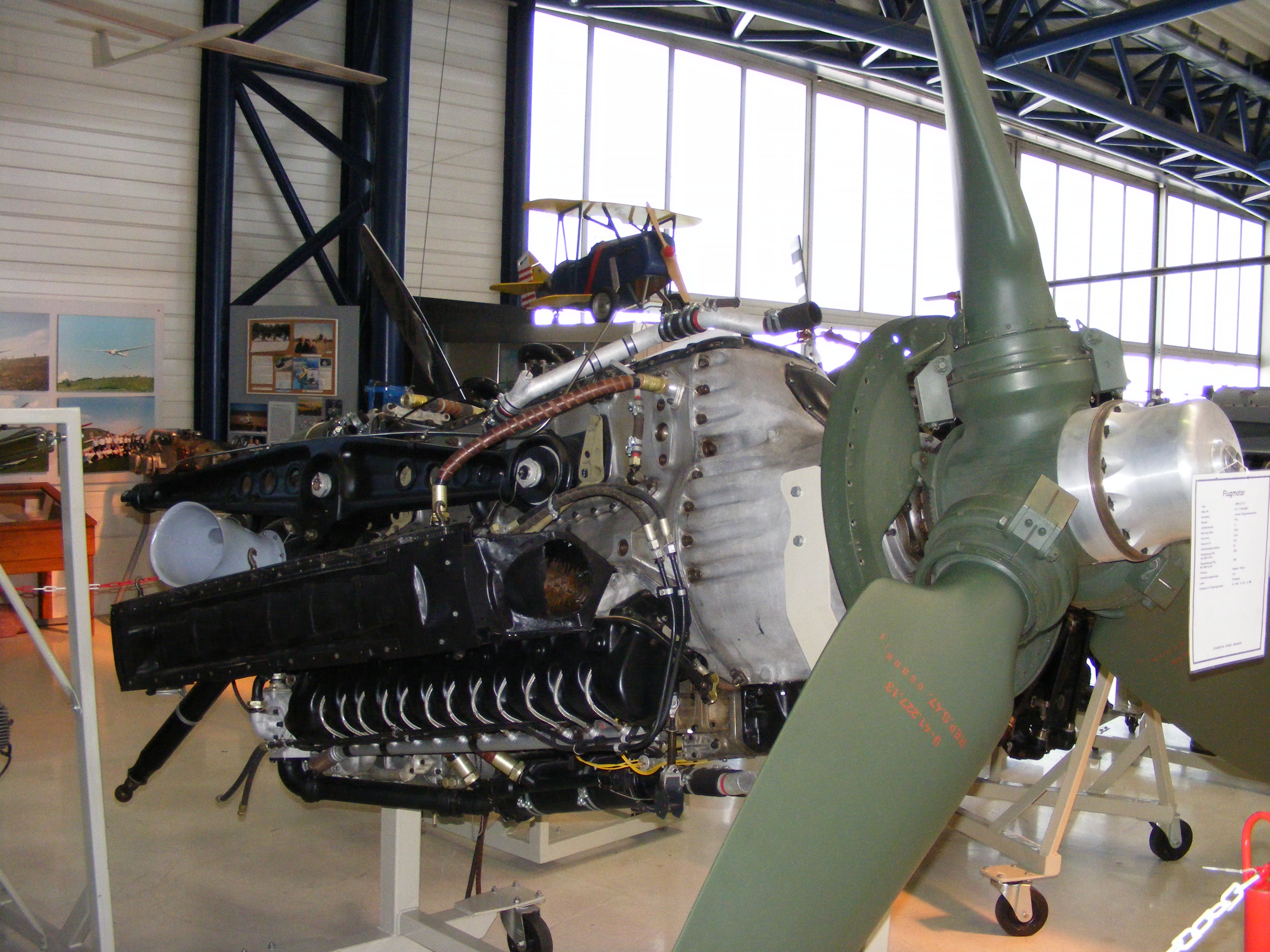
Junkers Jumo 213E-1 at Flugmuseum Aviaticum in Wiener Neustadt, Austria

The next major production versions were the 213E and the similar 213F. These engines were equipped with a new three-speed, two-stage supercharger that dramatically improved altitude performance. The only difference between the two models was that the E included an intercooler for additional high-altitude performance, while the F model lacked this and was optimized for slightly lower altitudes. The E and F models were in high demand for many late-war aircraft, including the Junkers Ju 188, Junkers Ju 388, the Langnasen-Dora models of the Focke-Wulf Fw 190D and the Focke-Wulf Ta 152H. All of these aircraft used annular radiators characteristic of the earlier Jumo 211 engine installations on twin-engined aircraft, often standardized as Kraftei (power-egg), completely unitized power plant "modules" for any twin or multi-engined aircraft, much as the Jumo 211 had evolved for earlier aircraft designs – but with the annular radiators noticeably reconfigured for better cooling of the more powerful Jumo 213 engine.

A further substantial upgrade was projected as the 213J, which replaced the earlier model's three valves with a new four-valve-per-cylinder design for increased volumetric efficiency. It was also to have had a two-stage three-speed supercharger, producing 2,350 hp (1,750 kW; 2,380 PS) at 3700 rpm for take-off. It would have weighed 1,055 kg (2,326 lb). There was no time to work this change into the production line before the war ended. Other experimental models included the 213S for low-altitude use, and the turbocharged 213T.

Further development of the Jumo 213 was carried out at Arsenal de l'Aéronautique in France after the Second World War.

== Variants ==
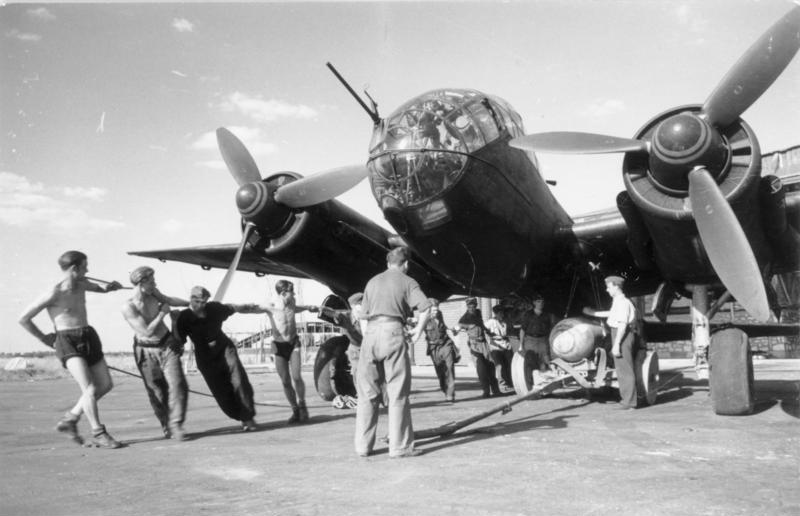
A Jumo 213-powered Ju 188, with reconfigured annular radiators

213A
First version, 1,750 PS (2,100 PS with MW50 boost, B4 fuel 87 Octane ) take-off power, major production version.
213B
Project, a 213A with C3 fuel (100 octane) and up to 2,000 PS take-off power.
213C
As 213A but equipped for mounting of a cannon firing through the propeller axis (Motorkanone), limited production.
213D
213C with a new three-speed supercharger, did not enter production.
213E
High altitude version of 213A, equipped with a three-speed two-stage intercooled supercharger and delivering 1,750 PS take-off power (2,050 PS with MW 50 boost).
213F
Similar to the 213E, but with the intercooler replaced by MW50 injection.
213J
Project, redesigned with four valves per-cylinder and a two-stage three-speed supercharger, delivering 2,380 PS at takeoff.
J13T
Proposed turbocharged variant.
Arsenal 12H
Post-war development of the Junkers Jumo 213 which had been in production for the Germans at the Arsenal de l'Aéronautique factories.
Arsenal 12H-Tandem
2x 12H engines in tandem driving co-axial propellers.
Arsenal 12K
Further development of the 12H.
Arsenal 24H
A 24-cylinder H-24 engine utilizing 12H cylinder blocks, crankshafts and pistons mounted on a new crankcase driving a single propeller. Rated at 3,600 hp (2,700 kW) take-off power and 3,000 hp (2,200 kW) at rated height.
Arsenal 24H-Tandem
2x 24H engines in tandem driving co-axial propellers. Example exhibited at 1946 Paris Air Show had take-off power of 7,200 hp (5,400 kW). Proposed for Sud-Est SE.1200 trans-Atlantic flying boat project, which would have used four 24H Tandem installations, each rated at 8,000 hp (6,000 kW).
SFECMAS 12H
The Arsenal 12H after SFECMAS absorbed Arsenal.
SFECMAS 12K
The Arsenal 12K after SFECMAS absorbed Arsenal.

== Applications ==
- Focke-Wulf Ta 152
- Focke-Wulf Ta 154
- Focke-Wulf Fw 190D
- Heinkel He 111H-22
- Junkers Ju 88
- Junkers Ju 188
- Junkers Ju 388
- Messerschmitt Me 209-II
- Messerschmitt Me 264 V1
- Nord Noroit
- SNCASO SO.8000 Narval

== Specifications (Jumo 213E) ==
=== General characteristics ===
- Type: 12-cylinder supercharged liquid-cooled inverted Vee piston aircraft engine
- Bore: 150 mm (5.906 in)
- Stroke: 165 mm (6.496 in)
- Displacement: 35 L (2,135.2 in³)
- Length: 2,266 mm (89.2 in)
- Width: 777 mm (30.6 in)
- Height: 980 mm (38.6 in)
- Dry weight: 1040 kg (2,072 lb)

=== Components ===
- Valvetrain: Three valves per cylinder
- Supercharger: Two-stage three-speed centrifugal type supercharger with MW50 injection into the intake and an aftercooler
- Cooling system: Pressurized water up to 120°C (248°F)

=== Performance ===
- Power output:
- 1,750 PS (1,726 hp, 1,287 kW) at 3,250 rpm for takeoff; rated altitude 9,600 m (31,500 ft)
- 2,050 PS (2,022 hp, 1,508 kW) for takeoff with MW50 injection
- Specific power: 50 PS/L (0.81 hp/in³, 36.8 kW/L)
- Compression ratio: 6.5:1 (B4 fuel, 87 octane)
- Power-to-weight ratio: 1.37 kW/kg (0.83 hp/lb)

== See also ==
Comparable engines

- Allison V-1710
- Daimler-Benz DB 603
- Daimler-Benz DB 605
- Klimov VK-107
- Mikulin AM-35
- Rolls-Royce Griffon

Related lists

- List of aircraft engines

== Bibliography ==
- Bingham, Victor (1998). Major Piston Aero Engines of World War II. Shrewsbury, UK: Airlife Publishing. ISBN 1-84037-012-2.
- Bridgman, Leonard (1948). Jane's All the World's Aircraft 1948. London: Sampson Low, Marston & Company, Ltd.
- Christopher, John (2013). The Race for Hitler's X-Planes: Britain's 1945 Mission to Capture Secret Luftwaffe Technology. Stroud, UK: History Press. ISBN 978-0-7524-6457-2.
- Gunston, Bill (2006). World Encyclopedia of Aero Engines: From the Pioneers to the Present Day (5th ed.). Stroud, UK: Sutton. ISBN 0-7509-4479-X.
- Kay, Antony (2004). Junkers Aircraft & Engines 1913–1945. London: Putnam Aeronautical Books. ISBN 0-85177-985-9.
