= MW 50 =

Fuel-related aircraft component

MW 50 (Methanol-Wasser 50) was a 50-50 mixture of methanol and water (German: Wasser) that was often sprayed into the supercharger of World War II aircraft engines primarily for its anti-detonation effect, allowing the use of increased boost pressures. Secondary effects were cooling of the engine and charge cooling. Higher boost was only effective at altitudes below the full-throttle height, where the supercharger could still provide additional boost pressure that was otherwise wasted, while the smaller secondary effects were useful even above that altitude.

== Composition ==
MW 50 is something of a misnomer, as it is actually a mixture of three fluids: 50% methanol acting primarily to achieve optimum anti-detonant effect, secondarily as an anti-freeze; 49.5% water; and 0.5% Schutzöl 39, an oil-based anti-corrosion additive. The similar MW 30 increased the water to 69.5% and decreased methanol to 30%. This increased the cooling performance but made it easier to freeze at -18 degrees C as opposed to -50 C for MW 50). As a result, this mixture was intended to be used for lower-altitude missions. EW 30 and EW 50 mixtures also existed, which substituted methanol with ethanol; in emergency, pure water could be used.

== Effect ==
The effect of MW 50 injection could be dramatic. Simply turning on the system allowed the engine to pull in more air due to the charge cooling effect, boosting performance by about 100 hp (75 kW) on the BMW 801 and DB 605. However, the MW 50 also allowed the supercharger to be run at much higher boost levels as well, for a combined increase of 500 hp (370 kW). At sea level, this allowed the 1,600 hp (1,200 kW) engine to run at over 2,000 hp (1,500 kW). MW 50 was fully effective up to about 6,000 m (20,000 ft), above which it added only about 4% extra power, due largely to charge cooling.

== Time limits ==
The increased power could be used for a maximum of 10 minutes at a time, much like the American war emergency power setting for their own aircraft, with at least five minutes between each application. Aircraft generally carried enough MW 50 for about two ten-minute periods of use, allowing them to increase their climb rate and level speed in combat for interception missions.

== Applications ==
Fittings for MW 50 first appeared on the BMW 801D in 1942, but it never went into production for this engine because the cylinder heads developed micro-cracks when MW 50 was used. Instead, the DB 605-engined later versions of the Messerschmitt Bf 109 were fitted with an MW 50 injection system, beginning in early 1944. Later engine designs all included the fittings as well, notably the Junkers Jumo 213, which relied on it to increase non-boosted performance and tune the supercharger for higher altitudes.

== Other systems ==
MW 50 was not the only charge cooling system to be used by the Germans. Some engines dedicated to high altitude included an intercooler instead, as they would be needing the cooling for longer periods of time. The 801D also included the ability to spray gasoline into the supercharger instead of MW 50. (The Erhöhte Notleistung [Increased Emergency Performance] system.) While this was not as effective, it did increase boost without the complexity of the additional tanking and plumbing. Many of the late-war engines also included a system for high-altitude boost, GM-1, which added oxygen to the fuel/air mix by injecting nitrous oxide into the supercharger instead of employing higher boost levels.

== See also ==
- Water injection (engine)
- War emergency power
