= Bareuther =

Bareuther is a surname. Notable people with the surname include:

- Ernst Bareuther (1838–1905), Austrian-Sudeten German politician
- Herbert Bareuther (1914–1945), German World War II flying ace

== See also ==
- Bayreuther (disambiguation)
