= Bayreuther =

Bayreuther is the adjectival form of Bayreuth, Germany, and may refer to:

== In Bayreuth ==
- Bayreuth Festival, German: Bayreuther Festspiele
- Bayreuther Blätter (Bayreuth pages), a monthly newsletter founded in 1878
- Bayreuther Osterfestival, an Easter Festival held at Bayreuth
- Bayreuther Brauhaus, a brewery, and its beers

== Elsewhere ==
- Gymnasium Bayreuther Straße, a school in Wuppertal, Germany, founded in 1907

== People ==
- Gavin Bayreuther (born 1994), American professional ice hockey player

== See also ==
- Bareuther, a surname
