= Willy Unger =

German World War II fighter pilot (1920–2005)

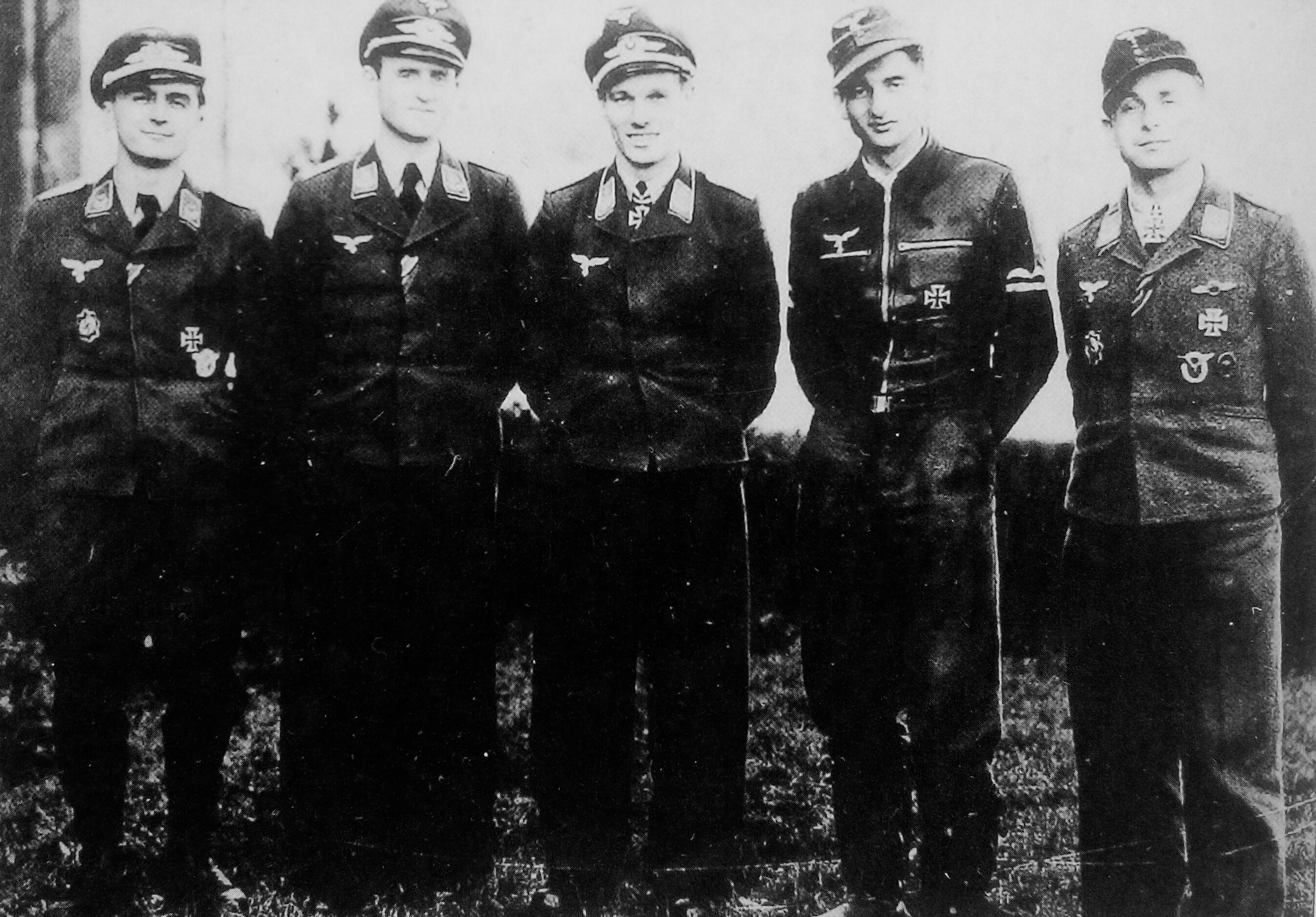
- Unger (right), Oskar Romm (center)
- Born: 27 March 1920; Warstein, Germany
- Died: 23 June 2005 (aged 85); Warstein, Germany
- Military career
- Allegiance: Nazi Germany
- Branch: Luftwaffe
- Service years: 1939–1945
- Rank: Leutnant (second lieutenant)
- Units: JG 3, JG 7
- Commands: 14./JG 3
- Conflicts: World War II; Defense of the Reich; Eastern Front
- Awards: Knight's Cross of the Iron Cross

Willy Unger (27 March 1920 – 23 June 2005) was a German Luftwaffe military aviator during World War II. As a fighter ace, he is credited with 24 enemy aircraft shot down in 59 combat missions. This figure includes 21 heavy bombers claimed on the Western Front in defense of the Reich missions and three on the Eastern Front.

Born in Warstein, Unger learned to fly glider aircraft as a teenager. Following the outbreak of World War II in September 1939, he joined the Luftwaffe and served as an aircraft mechanic. In late 1942, he began pilot training, following completion in early 1944, he was posted to Jagdgeschwader 3 "Udet" (JG 3—3rd Fighter Wing). Unger claimed his first aerial victory on 11 April 1944. On 23 October 1944, was awarded the Knight's Cross of the Iron Cross for 19 heavy four-engined bombers shot down. In January 1945, he was appointed Staffelkapitän (squadron leader) of 14. Staffel (14th squadron) of JG 3. Unger died on 23 June 2005 in his home town of Warstein.

== Early life and career ==
Unger was born on 27 March 1920 in Warstein in Province of Westphalia within the Weimar Republic. In 1934, he joined the local Hitler Youth where he learned to glider aircraft. He learned to build and fly the SG 38 Schulgleiter (school glider). Unger then progressed to the Schneider Grunau Baby glider, and by 1939 completed his A-, B- and C-license to fly glider aircraft. Following graduation from school, Unger received vocational education as a machinist.

World War II in Europe began on Friday 1 September 1939 when German forces invaded Poland. In consequence, Unger joined the military service in the Luftwaffe and received his military recruit training with a Fliegerausbildungs-Regiment (Flight Training Regiment). Due to his technical background as a machinist, he initially served as an aircraft mechanic. In late 1942, Unger was accepted for pilot training, (Note: Flight training in the Luftwaffe progressed through the levels A1, A2 and B1, B2, referred to as A/B flight training. A training included theoretical and practical training in aerobatics, navigation, long-distance flights and dead-stick landings. The B courses included high-altitude flights, instrument flights, night landings and training to handle the aircraft in difficult situations.) receiving his initial flight training with Flugzeugführerschule A/B 10 (FFS A/B 10—flight school for the pilot license) at Warnemünde. In January to February 1944, Unger received fighter pilot training with 2. Staffel (2nd squadron) of Ergänzungs-Jagdgruppe Ost, a supplementary training unit based at La Rochelle-La Leu, France. Following this training assignment, Unger was posted to 11. Staffel of Jagdgeschwader 3 "Udet" (JG 3—3rd Fighter Wing), a squadron of IV. Gruppe of JG 3.

== World War II ==
At the time of Unger's posting to JG 3, IV. Gruppe was commanded by Major Franz Beyer and was fighting in defense of the Reich. On 26 February, just after the United States Army Air Forces (USAAF) and the Royal Air Force (RAF) Bomber Command finished "Big Week", IV. Gruppe moved from Venlo in the Netherlands to Salzwedel in central Germany. At Salzwedel, the Gruppe was joined by Sturmstaffel 1, headed by Major Hans-Günter von Kornatzki. The Sturmstaffel was an experimental unit flying the so-called Sturmböcke (battering ram) up-gunned Focke-Wulf Fw 190 A-7 and A-8 aircraft.

=== In defense of the Reich ===
Combat box of a 12-plane B-17 squadron. Three such boxes completed a 36-plane group box.: 1. Lead Element; 2. High Element; 3. Low Element; 4. Low Low Element

On 11 April, Unger claimed his first aerial victories. At the time Unger was assigned to 11. Staffel of JG 3, the Staffel was commanded by Oberleutnant Otto Wessling. That day, the USAAF attacked the German aircraft industry in Oschersleben, Bernburg, Sorau, Cottbus and Arnimswalde, present-day Goleniów, with 917 heavy bombers escorted by 819 fighter aircraft. The Gruppe was scrambled at 10:05 with the order to unite with other Luftwaffe units of the 1. Jagd Division (1st Fighter Division) and 3. Jagd Division (3rd Fighter Division) over the Brocken. Between 10:00 and 10:30, the Luftwaffe fighters intercepted the USAAF bombers between Braunschweig and Halberstadt. During this aerial battle, Unger claimed a bomber shot down. Because the claim was not witnessed, he was not credited with the aerial victory. Following this mission, the Luftwaffe fighters were refueled and rearmed and were scrambled a second time at 12:40. The returning bombers were intercepted south of Rostock. Flying his fourth combat mission of the war, Unger was credited with a Boeing B-17 Flying Fortress shot down.

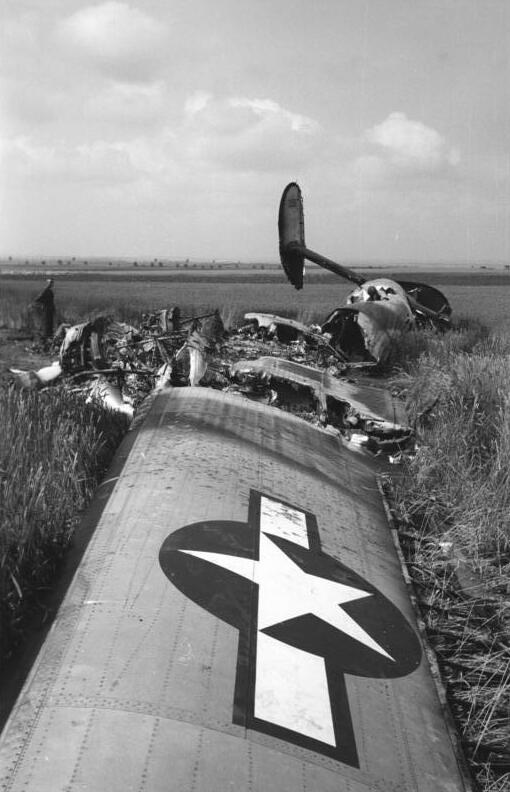
shot down Consolidated B-24 Liberator of the 492d Bombardment Group after the aerial battle at Oschersleben on 7 July 1944

Two days later, the USAAF Eighth Air Force attacked the ball-bearing factories of Schweinfurt, the Messerschmitt factory at Augsburg, the Dornier factory at Oberpfaffenhofen and the Luftwaffe Lechfeld Airfield. IV. Gruppe attacked the third wave of bombers near Aschaffenburg in a frontal attack. During this attack, Unger shot down a B-17 bomber. On 15 April, General der Jagdflieger Adolf Galland visited IV. Gruppe at Salzwedel and announced that the Gruppe was to be converted to a Sturmgruppe following the example of Sturmstaffel 1. In consequence, the Sturmgruppe was placed under the command of Hauptmann Wilhelm Moritz and 11. Staffel was merged with the experimental Sturmstaffel 1 and renamed to 11. Sturmstaffel and placed under the command of Oberleutnant Werner Gerth after Weßling was killed in action on 19 April. On 18, the USAAF Eighth Air Force headed for industrial targets near Berlin. The USAAF 3rd Bombardment Division was intercepted in the area Rathenow and Nauen. During the course of a 20 minutes aerial battle, Unger claimed two B-17 bombers shot down. The following day, the USAAF Eighth Air Force attacked the German aircraft manufacturing and aircraft engine industry as well as various Luftwaffe airfields in Westphalia and Hesse. IV. Gruppe took off at 09:30 and met up with the other two Gruppen of JG 3 near Göttingen and Kassel. During this mission, Unger shot down a B-17. The USAAF Eighth Air Force sent 803 heavy bombers to attack transportation infrastructure in western Germany, including the marshalling yard at Hamm. IV. Gruppe was scrambled at 18:20 and intercepted the bombers of the 2nd Bombardment Division at 19:40. In this encounter, the four aerial victories. This number includes an Herausschuss (separation shot)—a severely damaged heavy bomber forced to separate from its combat box which was counted as an aerial victory—over a Consolidated B-24 Liberator bomber.

On 24 April, the USAAF sent its bombers to the German aircraft industry located in southern Germany. At 13:30, Luftwaffe units intercepted the bombers west of Munich. In this encounter, Unger was credited with an aerial victory over a B-17 bomber. The USAAF Eighth Air Force flew its next daylight mission on 29 April, attacking Berlin with 679 heavy bombers of which 618 reached the target area. IV. Gruppe was scrambled at 10:10 and the bombers were first sighted in the area of Magdeburg. Although the bombers were protected by escorting fighters, IV. Gruppe flew two frontal attacks. The Luftwaffe pilots claimed twelve aerial victories and nine Herausschüsse, including one by Unger, for the loss of five Fw 190 fighters damaged in combat. In May 1944, the Luftwaffe experimented with rearwards firing Werfer-Granate 21 rocket-propelled mortars, also known as the Krebsgerät (Crab Device). The idea was that the pilot would first fire his forward facing weapons against the bomber, followed by firing a time-delayed mortar after passing the bomber formation. In total, 20 Fw 190 A-8 fighter aircraft were fitted with the Krebsgerät on the orders of Galland. While based at Barth, Unger was one of the pilots who tested the Krebsgerät, reporting that the weight of the device further deteriorated the performance of the heavily armored Sturmbock variant of the Fw 190 in both speed and maneuverability.

On 8 May 1944 he was shot down by defensive fire from one of the B-17s, but managed to make a gear-up landing in his Messerschmitt Bf 109 G-6 at Uelzen. Awarded the Honor Goblet of the Luftwaffe (Ehrenpokal der Luftwaffe) on 21 June 1944, Unger hit two B-24 Liberator over the town of Oschersleben on 7 July 1944, claiming his 10th and 11th victories. In total, Luftwaffe pilots claimed the destruction of 60 bombers while actual losses were 28 bombers destroyed and further bombers returned with various levels of combat damage. The authors Prien, Stemmer and Bock state that the consolidated attack flown in close formation by the Sturmgruppe resulted in overclaiming of aerial victories caused by the confusing combat situation. During these attacks, multiple pilots may have simultaneously fired at the same bomber. It was therefore unclear who was responsible for the destruction of the bomber.

On 3 August 1944, he shot down two further B-24s, but his Fw 190 A-8 was hit again, forcing him to abandon his aircraft. In August 1944 Unger vas awarded the German Cross in Gold. On 23 October 1944, when he had accounted for a total of 19 four-engine bombers, Fahnenjunker-Oberfeldwebel Unger was awarded the Knight's Cross of the Iron Cross (Ritterkreuz des Eisernen Kreuzes). In December 1944, Unger was promoted to Leutnant (second lieutenant).

=== Eastern Front and end of war ===
On 12 January 1945, Soviet forces launched the Vistula–Oder offensive advancing into German-held territory, capturing Kraków, Warsaw and Poznań on the Eastern Front. In consequence, on 21 January, IV. Sturmgruppe was ordered to relocate from Gütersloh Airfield to Märkisch Friedland, present-day Mirosławiec, located approximately 75 kilometers (47 miles) east of Stargard. With this transfer, the Sturmgruppe came under the control of the 1. Flieger-Division (1st Air Division), commanded by Generalmajor Robert Fuchs, and subordinated to II. Fliegerkorps (2nd Air Corps), headed by General der Flieger Martin Fiebig. The following day, Unger was appointed Staffelkapitän (squadron leader) of 14. Sturmstaffel of JG 3, succeeding Oberleutnant Karl-Heinz von den Steinen who was transferred. On 27 January, Märkisch Friedland had to be abandoned and the Sturmgruppe retreated to an airfield 75 kilometers (47 miles) southwest of Stargard. Over the next weeks, the Sturmgruppe predominantly flew fighter-bomber missions in support of German ground forces retreating towards the Oder.

On 19 February, the Sturmgruppe flew ground support missions south of Stargard near the Oder. During this mission, Luftwaffe pilots claimed five aerial victories, including a Bell P-39 Airacobra fighter aircraft by Unger. On 15 March, the Sturmgruppe flew multiple combat missions to combat area near Stettin. During these missions, Unger shot down two Petlyakov Pe-2 bombers. On 2 April, Unger left for Brandenburg-Briest when he was transferred to Jagdgeschwader 7 "Nowotny" (JG 7—7th Fighter Wing) operating the revolutionary Messerschmitt Me 262 jet fighter without claiming further aerial victories. He was succeeded by Leutnant Herbert Bareuther as commander of 14. Sturmstaffel of JG 3.

== Later life ==
Unger died on 23 June 2005 at the age of 85 in his home town of Warstein, Germany.

== Summary of career ==
=== Aerial victory claims ===
According to Forsyth, Unger was credited with 24 aerial victories, including 21 heavy bombers. Obermaier lists Unger with 22 aerial victories, including 19 heavy bombers and three on the Eastern Front, claimed in 59 combat missions. Mathews and Foreman, authors of Luftwaffe Aces — Biographies and Victory Claims, researched the German Federal Archives and found records for 21 aerial victory claims, plus three further unconfirmed claim. This figure includes three aerial victories on the Eastern Front and 18 Western Allies heavy bombers.

Victory claims were logged to a map-reference (PQ = Planquadrat), for example "PQ 15 Ost S/UE-3". The Luftwaffe grid map (Jägermeldenetz) covered all of Europe, western Russia and North Africa and was composed of rectangles measuring 15 minutes of latitude by 30 minutes of longitude, an area of about 360 square miles (930 km^{2}). These sectors were then subdivided into 36 smaller units to give a location area 3 km × 4 km (1.9 mi × 2.5 mi) in size.

Chronicle of aerial victories
This and the – (dash) indicates unconfirmed aerial victory claims for which Unger did not receive credit. This along with the * (asterisk) indicates an Herausschuss (separation shot)—a severely damaged heavy bomber forced to separate from his combat box which was counted as an aerial victory. This and the ? (question mark) indicates information discrepancies listed by Prien, Stemmer, Bock, Mathews and Foreman.
Claim	Date	Time	Type	Location	Claim	Date	Time	Type	Location
– 11. Staffel of Jagdgeschwader 3 "Udet" – Defense of the Reich — April – May 1944
1	11 April 1944	13:27	B-17	PQ 15 Ost S/UE-3, Warnemünde	5	19 April 1944	10:47	B-17	PQ 05 Ost S/LU - 15 Ost S/LA vicinity of Kassel
—	11 April 1944? (Note: According to Mathews and Foreman claimed on 9 April 1944.)	—	B-17		6? (Note: According to Mathews and Foreman this Herausschuss was unconfirmed.)	22 April 1944	—	B-24*	PQ 05 Ost S/NQ - OQ southwest of Siegen
2	13 April 1944	14:05	B-17	PQ 05 Ost S/QU northwest of Würzburg	7	24 April 1944	13:35	B-17*	PQ 04 Ost S/CE, northeast of Munich
3	18 April 1944	14:32	B-17	northwest of Nauen	8?	29 April 1944	13:20	B-17*? (Note: According to Mathews and Foreman claimed as a Consolidated B-24 Liberator.)	
4	18 April 1944	14:38	B-17	PQ 15 Ost S/EF-7 north-northwest of Friesack	9	8 May 1944	10:07	B-24	PQ 15 Ost S/FA-1 north of Braunschweig
– 12. Sturmstaffel of Jagdgeschwader 3 "Udet" – Defense of the Reich — July – 10 August 1944
10	7 July 1944	09:42	B-24	PQ 15 Ost S/HC, Oschersleben	13	29 July 1944	10:30	B-17	PQ 15 Ost S/ME; Zeitz-Groitzsch
11	7 July 1944	09:43	B-24	PQ 15 Ost S/HC, Oschersleben	14	3 August 1944	11:40	B-24	PQ 04 Ost S/GB-3/6; Füssen
12	18 July 1944	10:50	B-17	30 km (19 mi) southeast of Memmingen	15	3 August 1944	11:41	B-24	PQ 04 Ost S/FB-GB-3/6; Füssen
– 15. Sturmstaffel of Jagdgeschwader 3 "Udet" – Defense of the Reich — 10 August 1944 – 22 January 1945
16	29 August 1944	10:46	B-17	PQ 15 Ost S/UQ-UR; Brünn	19	12 September 1944	11:45	B-17	PQ 15 Ost S/DG-EG-DH-EH north of Berlin
17	29 August 1944	10:47	B-17	PQ 15 Ost S/UQ-UR; Brünn	20	7 October 1944	12:06	B-17	PQ 15 Ost S/LC-MD northeast of Kölleda
18	11 September 1944	12:02	B-17	PQ 15 Ost S/LC-KD; Hettstedt					
– 14. Sturmstaffel of Jagdgeschwader 3 "Udet" – Defense of the Reich in the East — 22 January – 2 April 1945
21	19 February 1945	13:18	P-39	7 km (4.3 mi) southeast of Stargard	23	15 March 1945	13:58	Pe-2	vicinity of Greifenberg
22	15 March 1945	13:55	Pe-2	vicinity of Greifenberg					

=== Awards ===
- Iron Cross (1939) 2nd and 1st Class
- Wound Badge in Black (8 May 1944)
- Honor Goblet of the Luftwaffe (21 June 1944)
- German Cross in Gold in August 1944 as Fahnenjunker-Feldwebel in the 12./Jagdgeschwader 3
- Knight's Cross of the Iron Cross on 23 October 1944 as Fahnenjunker-Feldwebel and pilot in the IV.(Sturm)/Jagdgeschwader 3 "Udet" (Note: According to Scherzer in the 15.(Sturm)/Jagdgeschwader 3 "Udet".)
