= Otto Wessling =

German fighter ace and Knight's Cross recipient

- Born: 23 September 1913; Bad Harzburg, German Empire
- Died: 19 April 1944 (aged 30); Eschwege, Germany
- Cause of death: Killed in action
- Military career
- Allegiance: Nazi Germany
- Branch: Luftwaffe
- Service years: 1937–1944
- Rank: Hauptmann of the Reserves
- Units: JG 3, EJGr Ost
- Commands: 10./JG 3, 11./JG 3
- Conflicts: See battles World War II: Battle of Britain; Operation Barbarossa; Italian Campaign; Defense of the Reich †
- Awards: Knight's Cross of the Iron Cross with Oak Leaves

Otto Wessling (Note: The spelling of the family name is Wessling, not Weßling.) (23 September 1913 – 19 April 1944) was a German Luftwaffe military aviator and fighter ace during World War II. He is credited with up to 83 aerial victories achieved in an unknown number of combat missions. This figure includes 55 aerial victories on the Eastern Front, and further claims over the Western Allies, including 15 four-engined bombers.

Born in Bad Harzburg, Wessling grew up in the German Empire, the Weimar Republic and Nazi Germany. He received a vocational education and then joined the military service in the Luftwaffe in 1937. Following flight training, he was posted to Jagdgeschwader 3 (JG 3—3rd Fighter Wing) in March 1940. Flying with this wing, Wessling claimed his first aerial victory on 30 June 1941 on the Western Front over a Royal Air Force fighter aircraft. In June 1941, his unit was transferred east and fought in Operation Barbarossa, the German invasion of the Soviet Union. On 4 September 1942, Wessling was awarded the Knight's Cross of the Iron Cross for 62 aerial victories claimed. He then served as a fighter pilot instructor with Ergänzungs-Jagdgruppe Ost and became an officer. Transferred back to JG 3 in June 1943, his unit fought in the Mediterranean theater. There, Wessling was made Staffelkapitän (squadron leader) of 10. Staffel (10th squadron) of JG 3 on 16 July. A week later, he was severely wounded requiring a lengthy period of convelesance. He returned to JG 3 in February 1944 and was given command of 11. Staffel which was then fighting in Defense of the Reich. On 19 April 1944, he was shot down by US fighters near Kassel and crash landed his damaged aircraft at Eschwege when he was killed by strafing US fighters. On 20 July 1944, Wessling was posthumously awarded the Knight's Cross of the Iron Cross with Oak Leaves.

== Early life and career ==
Wessling, the son of a laborer in a quarry, was born on 23 September 1913 in Bad Harzburg in the Duchy of Brunswick of the German Empire. Following graduation from school, he received a vocational education as a merchant. Trained as a pilot with the German Air Sports Association (Deutscher Luftsportverband), he joined the Luftwaffe in 1937, serving in the military reserve.

== World War II ==
World War II in Europe began on Friday 1 September 1939, when German forces invaded Poland. Wessling was posted to the 9. Staffel (9th squadron) of Jagdgeschwader 3 (JG 3—3rd Fighter Wing) in March 1940. At the time, 9. Staffel, headed by Oberleutnant Heinz Kupka was subordinated to III. Gruppe (3rd group) of JG 3 under the leadership of Hauptmann Walter Kienitz. The Gruppe had been newly created on 1 March at the airfield in Jena-Rödingen as part of the Luftwaffe expansion plan of 11 October 1939. Wessling was one of 28 pilots assigned to the Gruppe which was equipped with the Messerschmitt Bf 109 E-1 and E-3. On 28 March, the Gruppe was ordered to Detmold Airfield where it stayed until 10 April, when it relocated to Hopsten Airfield in preparation for the Battle of France.

=== Battle of Britain ===
Following the Battle of France, III. Gruppe moved to an airfield at Dieppe on 29 June 1940 in preparation for would become the Battle of Britain. The next day, Wessling claimed a Royal Air Force (RAF) Supermarine Spitfire fighter shot down, a claim which was not confirmed. On 10 July, seven RAF Bristol Blenheim bombers attacked the Amiens – Glisy Aerodrome. The bombers were intercepted by fighters from III. Gruppe and shot all seven bombers down, including one by Wessling. On 21 July, III. Gruppe was withdrawn from the English Channel and relocated to Dortmund Airfield for a brief period of rest, replenishment and maintenance overhaul. On 8 August, the Gruppe moved to an airfield at Desvres. On 1 September, Hauptmann Wilhelm Balthasar replaced Hauptmann Walter Kienitz as commander of III. Gruppe. On 27 September, Luftwaffe forces attacked and bombed London. That day, the Luftwaffe lost 19 Bf 109 single engine fighters, 19 Messerschmitt Bf 110 heavy fighters and 17 Junkers Ju 88 bombers. The RAF lost 48 fighters, including a Spitfire claimed by Wessling. RAF Fighter Command lost 18 Spitfires destroyed or damaged to all causes in the days air battles.

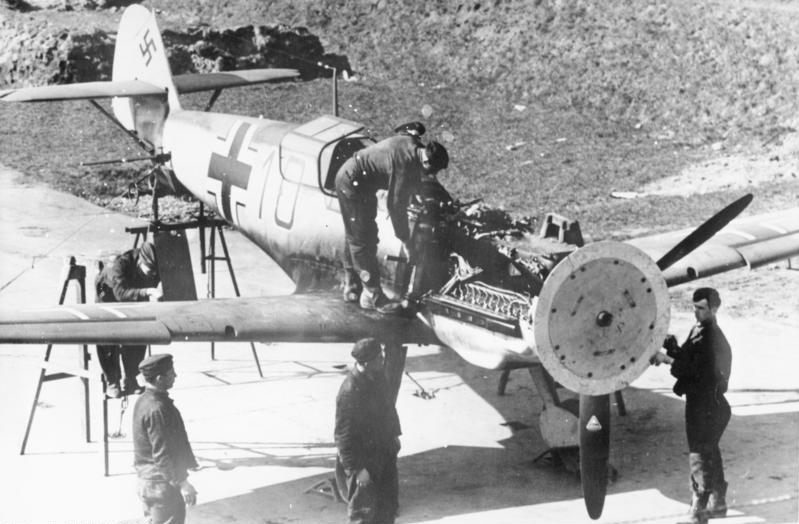
A Bf 109 E-1 of the JG 3 similar to those flown by Wessling.

In November 1940, the group commander, Balthasar, had to be sent to a hospital as his injury sustained on 4 September had still not fully healed. He would eventually be replaced by Hauptmann Walter Oesau. On Christmas Eve, Adolf Hitler visited the Gruppe at the Desvres airfield. An event which the Nazi propaganda exploited and recorded for Die Deutsche Wochenschau, a newsreel series released in the cinemas. On 5 February 1941, the RAF flew "Circus" No. 3 targeting the Saint-Omer with twelve Blenheim bombers escorted by RAF fighters. Intercepted by fighters from I. and III. Gruppe of JG 3 fighters near Pas-de-Calais, Wessling claimed a Hawker Hurricane fighter shot down. On 15 February, III. Gruppe was withdrawn from the English Channel. The remaining serviceable aircraft were transferred to Jagdgeschwader 51 (JG 51—51st Fighter Wing). The Gruppe then traveled to Gütersloh Airfield by train. The pilots then went on a skiing vacation in Kleinwalsertal from 8 to 26 March. On 17 April, the Gruppe was reequipped with Bf 109 F-2. On 3 May, the Gruppe was again sent to France where they were based at Auchy-au-Bois. On 21 May, the RAF launched "Circus" No. 10 which sent eleven bombers from No. 21 and six bombers No. 110 Squadron to bomb the power station, benzole refinery at Gosnay. Defending against this attack, Wessling shot down the Blenheim bomber V6390 from No. 110 Squadron.

The Gruppe flew its last mission against the RAF on 7 June. In preparation for Operation Barbarossa, III. Gruppe was ordered to relocate east on 9 June. During the layover at Straubing, the commanding officer of 9. Staffel, Oberleutnant Max Jaczak, who had led the Staffel since 30 October 1940, was killed in a flying accident. In consequence, command of 9. Staffel was passed to Oberleutnant Viktor Bauer before the Gruppe continued their journey to Breslau-Schöngarten Airfield, present-day Wrocław Airport.

=== War against the Soviet Union ===
The Gruppe relocated to an airfield at Moderówka on 18 June where the Gruppe concluded their last preparations for Operation Barbarossa. At the start of the campaign, JG 3 was subordinated to the V. Fliegerkorps (5th Air Corps), under command of General der Flieger Robert Ritter von Greim, which was part of Luftflotte 4 (4th Air Fleet), under command of Generaloberst Alexander Löhr. These air elements supported Generalfeldmarschall Gerd von Rundstedt's Heeresgruppe Süd (Army Group South), with the objective of capturing Ukraine and its capital Kiev. Wessling claimed his first aerial victory of the campaign on 3 October. By then, the Gruppe was based at Gluchow and was engaged in the Battle of Moscow. That day, he was claimed an I-17 fighter, an early war designation for the Mikoyan-Gurevich MiG-1. On 5 October, Wessling claimed an Ilyushin Il-2 ground-attack aircraft destroyed.

On 6 November, III. Gruppe was withdrawn from the Eastern Front and sent to Mannheim-Sandhofen Airfield for a period of rest and replenishment. The first elements of the Gruppe arrived by train in Mannheim on 8 December, the transfer was completed a week later. There, the personnel was sent on home leave. The Gruppe received a full complement of 41 Bf 109 F-4 aircraft and on 6 January 1942 was ordered to relocated to Sicily. On 13 January, 7. Staffel and elements of 8. and 9. Staffel boarded a train to Bari in southern Italy while the rest of III. Gruppe headed for Sciacca, Sicily. The relocation progressed until 26 January when new orders were received, ordering the Gruppe to return to Germany. At Jesau near Königsberg, present-day Kaliningrad in Russia, III. Gruppe began preparations for redeployment to the Eastern Front. Wessling claimed his next aerial victories in March 1942 while German forces were fighting in the Demyansk Pocket, an area southeast of Lake Ilmen. The Gruppe had been moved to an airfield at Soltsy on 10 February. Wessling claimed an I-61 fighter, an early war designation for the Mikoyan-Gurevich MiG-3, on 4, 6 and 7 March, and two I-61 fighters on 8 March. On 15 March, Wessling claimed an I-301 fighter, an early war designation for the Lavochkin-Gorbunov-Gudkov LaGG-3, followed by three further I-301 fighters claimed two days later. He then claimed a U-2 biplane which referred to a Polikarpov Po-2.

Wessling was presented the German Cross in Gold (Deutsches Kreuz in Gold) on 11 May 1942. He was then transferred to 3. Staffel of JG 3. The Staffel was then under command of Oberleutnant Alfons Raich and subordinated to I. Gruppe headed by Hauptmann Georg Michalek and was based at Kharkov-Rogan airfield, southeast of Kharkov. On 21 July, Wessling was shot down by Soviet anti-aircraft artillery behind enemy lines south of Belayev. His Bf 109 F-4 trop (Werknummer 10222—factory number) crashed 8 kilometers (5.0 miles) west of Morozovsk.

On 4 September 1942, Wessling was awarded the Knight's Cross of the Iron Cross (Ritterkreuz des Eisernen Kreuzes) for 62 aerial victories claimed. He was then transferred to Ergänzungs-Jagdgruppe Ost, specialized training unit for new fighter pilots destined for the Eastern Front, as an instructor. During this assignment, he was promoted to Leutnant (second lieutenant) of the Reserves, the promotion backdated to 1 August 1942.

=== Squadron leader and Mediterranean theater ===
As part of the 1943 Luftwaffe expansion of the fighter force, a newly created IV. Gruppe of JG 3 was created at Neubiberg Airfield on 1 June. The Gruppe was placed under the command of Hauptmann Franz Beyer. Oberleutnant Franz Daspelgruber was tasked with creation of 10. Staffel, assisted by Wessling who had been transferred. The Gruppe was staffed with 40 pilots and equipped with the Bf 109 G-6. In mid-June, IV. Gruppe received orders to relocate to southern Italy. On 19 June, 10. Staffel began its relocation arriving in Lecce the following day where they fought in the Mediterranean theater.

The Gruppe flew its first combat missions on 2 July when a United States Army Air Forces (USAAF) heavy bomber formation was detected heading for Taranto. During the aerial battle over the Gulf of Taranto, Wessling claimed two Consolidated B-24 Liberator bombers shot down. As a consequence of the Allied invasion of Sicily, IV. Gruppe moved to an airfield at Ramacca on 11 July. The following day, IV. Gruppe flew multiple combat missions to the area of Syracuse on the southern Sicilian coast. During the course of which, Wessling claimed three Spitfire fighters shot down. On 15 July, the Gruppe had to abandon the airfield at Ramacca due to advancing Allied forces and retreated back to the airfield at Lecce in southern Italy. The next day, Daspelgruber was killed in action. In consequence, Wessling was appointed Staffelkapitän (squadron leader) of 10. Staffel of JG 3. That day, Wessling also claimed two B-24 bombers shot down. On 18 July, IV. Gruppe moved to an airfield at Leverano located approximately 15 kilometers (9.3 miles) southwest of Lecce. That day, Wessling claimed a Lockheed P-38 Lightning fighter aircraft destroyed. On 21 July, the airfield at Leverano came under a carpet bombing attack, killing four men. Two day later, the airfield again came under attack, killing one pilot wounding six, two of whiom later succumbed to their injuries. The ground personnel lost 30 men killed, a further 31 were wounded with three of them succumbing to their injuries. Among those injured was Wessling who had to be replaced by Oberleutnant Alfred Humer as commander of 10. Staffel.

=== Defense of the Reich and death ===
On 10 February 1944, Leutnant Hermann Schmied, the commander of 11. Staffel of JG 3, was killed in action. Following his convalescence and return to active duty, Wessling replaced Schmied as Staffelkapitän of 11. Staffel later that month. At the time, IV. Gruppe was based at Venlo. The next day, the Gruppenkommandeur Beyer was also killed in action. The Gruppe was then temporarily led by Hauptmann Heinz Lang before the position was passed to Major Friedrich-Karl Müller on 26 February. Following the USAAF offensive dubbed "Big Week", the Gruppe moved to Salzwedel in central Germany now fighting in Defense of the Reich. At Salzwedel, the Gruppe was joined by Sturmstaffel 1, headed by Major Hans-Günter von Kornatzki. The Sturmstaffel was an experimental unit flying the so-called Sturmböcke (battering ram), up-gunned Focke-Wulf Fw 190 A-7 and A-8 aircraft, as a means to combat the USAAF heavy bombers.

The USAAF Eighth Air Force targeted Braunschweig and airfields at Münster and Osnabrück on 23 March. Units of JG 3 intercepted the USAAF bombers of the 1st Bombardment Division in the area north of Hamm in a frontal attack. During this engagement, Wessling was credited with shooting a Boeing B-17 Flying Fortress bomber and a P-38 escort fighter. The USAAF bombers again bombed Braunschweig on 29 March. Defending against this attack, Wessling claimed a B-17 bomber and a North American P-51 Mustang escort fighter over the combat area west and south of Verden an der Aller. On 8 April, the USAAF sent 664 heavy bombers to the aircraft factories near Braunschweig and the Luftwaffe airfields in northwestern Germany, among them airfields at Oldenburg, Quakenbrück, Achmer, Rheine and Twente in the Netherlands. The bombers were escorted by 780 fighter aircraft. The Luftwaffe countered this attack of 497 fighter aircraft. At 13:05, IV. Gruppe took off from Salzwedel and intercepted the bombers at 14:00 northwest of Braunschweig. During this encounter, Wessling claimed a B-17 bomber and a B-24 bomber shot down. The next day, the USAAF Eighth Air Force attacked the German aircraft industry and airfields at Marienburg, present-day Malbork, Tutow, Posen, present-day Poznań, Warnemünde and Rostock. The Luftwaffe intercepted the bombers near Rügen over the Baltic Sea. That day, Wessling claimed a B-24 bomber shot down.

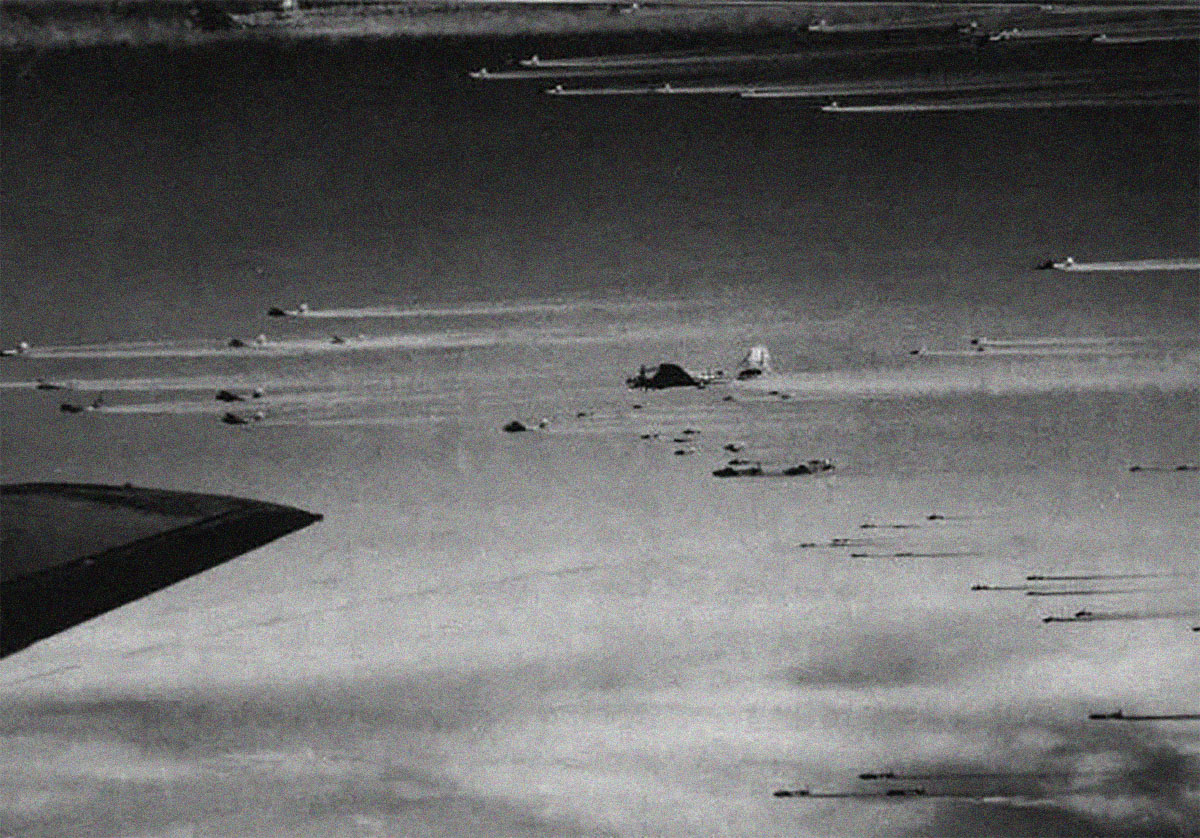
Combat boxes of 3rd Bombardment Division B-17s

On 11 April, the USAAF attacked the German aircraft industry in Oschersleben, Bernburg, Sorau, Cottbus and Arnimswalde, present-day Załom (eastern part of Szczecin, Poland), with 917 heavy bombers escorted by 819 fighter aircraft. The Gruppe was scrambled at 10:05 with the order to unite with other Luftwaffe units of the 1. Jagd Division (1st Fighter Division) and 3. Jagd Division (3rd Fighter Division) over the Brocken. Between 10:00 and 10:30, the Luftwaffe fighters intercepted the USAAF bombers between Braunschweig and Halberstadt. During this aerial battle, Wessling claimed two bombers shot down. Following this mission, the Luftwaffe fighters were refueled and rearmed and were scrambled a second time at 12:40. The returning bombers were intercepted south of Rostock. During this combat mission, Wessling was credited with a B-17 bomber shot down, his 80th aerial victory in total. Two days later, the USAAF Eighth Air Force attacked the ball-bearing factories of Schweinfurt, the Messerschmitt factory at Augsburg, the Dornier factory at Oberpfaffenhofen and the Luftwaffe Lechfeld Airfield. IV. Gruppe attacked the third wave of bombers near Aschaffenburg in a frontal attack. During this attack, Wessling shot down a B-17 bomber.

On 15 April, General der Jagdflieger Adolf Galland visited IV. Gruppe at Salzwedel and announced that the Gruppe was to be converted to a Sturmgruppe following the example of Sturmstaffel 1. In consequence, the Sturmgruppe was placed under the command of Hauptmann Wilhelm Moritz and 11. Staffel was to be merged with the experimental Sturmstaffel 1 and renamed to 11. Sturmstaffel. Three days later, the USAAF Eighth Air Force headed for industrial targets near Berlin. The USAAF 3rd Bombardment Division was intercepted in the area of Rathenow and Nauen. During the course of a 20 minute aerial battle, Wessling claimed two B-17 bombers shot down, his last claims.

The USAAF Eighth Air Force attacked the German aircraft manufacturing and aircraft engine industry as well as various Luftwaffe airfields in Westphalia and Hesse on 19 April. IV. Gruppe took off at 09:30 and met up with the other two Gruppen of JG 3 near Göttingen and Kassel. That day, Wessling was killed in action when his Bf 109 G-6 (Werknummer 412052) was shot down in aerial combat near Eschwege. He had managed to make an emergency landing and had just escaped from his burning aircraft when he was shot by strafing P-51 fighters. He was succeeded by Leutnant Werner Gerth as commander of the recently formed 11. Sturmstaffel. On 20 July 1944, Wessling was posthumously awarded the Knight's Cross of the Iron Cross with Oak Leaves (Ritterkreuz des Eisernen Kreuzes mit Eichenlaub), the 530th soldier or officer of the Wehrmacht to receive this award. Wessling was also posthumously promoted Hauptmann (captain) of the Reserves.

== Summary of career ==
=== Aerial victory claims ===
According to US historian David T. Zabecki, Wessling was credited with 83 aerial victories. Spick also lists Wessling with 83 aerial victories claimed in an unknown number of combat missions. Mathews and Foreman, authors of Luftwaffe Aces — Biographies and Victory Claims, researched the German Federal Archives and found records for 80 aerial victory claims, plus one further unconfirmed claim. This figure includes 55 aerial victories on the Eastern Front and 25 over the Western Allies, including 15 four-engined bombers.

Victory claims were logged to a map-reference (PQ = Planquadrat), for example "PQ 35 Ost 39364". The Luftwaffe grid map (Jägermeldenetz) covered all of Europe, western Russia and North Africa and was composed of rectangles measuring 15 minutes of latitude by 30 minutes of longitude, an area of about 360 square miles (930 km^{2}). These sectors were then subdivided into 36 smaller units to give a location area 3 km × 4 km (1.9 mi × 2.5 mi) in size.

Chronicle of aerial victories
This and the ? (question mark) indicates information discrepancies listed by Prien, Stemmer, Rodeike, Bock, Mathews and Foreman.
– 9. Staffel of Jagdgeschwader 3 – At the Channel and over England — 26 June 1940 – 9 June 1941
1	30 June 1940	15:45	Spitfire	west of Saint-Omer	3	27 September 1940	15:45	Spitfire	
2	10 July 1940	14:33	Blenheim	20 km (12 mi) west of Arras					
According to Prien, Stemmer, Rodeike and Bock, the 4th aerial victory was not documented. Mathews and Foreman do not list this claim.
5	5 February 1941	14:00	Hurricane	west of Calais	6? (Note: This unconfirmed claim is not listed by Mathews and Foreman.)	21 May 1941	—	Blenheim	north of Saint-Pol
– 9. Staffel of Jagdgeschwader 3 – Operation Barbarossa — 22 June – 4 October 1941
7	3 October 1941	15:55	I-17 (MiG-1)		8	5 October 1941	14:35	Il-2	
– 9. Staffel of Jagdgeschwader 3 – Eastern Front — 10 February – 14 April 1942
9	4 March 1942	10:30	I-61 (MiG-3)		20	20 March 1942	09:35	I-61 (MiG-3)	
10	6 March 1942	11:40	I-61 (MiG-3)		21	22 March 1942	16:56	Il-2	
11	7 March 1942	15:05	I-61 (MiG-3)		22	22 March 1942	17:02	Il-2	
12	8 March 1942	16:20	I-61 (MiG-3)	20 km (12 mi) southeast of Staraya Russa	23	28 March 1942	12:40	I-301 (LaGG-3)	
13	8 March 1942	16:20? (Note: According to Mathews and Foreman claimed at 16:23.)	I-61 (MiG-3)	20 km (12 mi) southeast of Staraya Russa	24	28 March 1942	12:50	I-301 (LaGG-3)	
14	15 March 1942	16:15	I-301 (LaGG-3)		25	30 March 1942	11:40	I-61 (MiG-3)	
15	17 March 1942	10:35	I-301 (LaGG-3)		26	31 March 1942	14:40	I-61 (MiG-3)	
16	17 March 1942	10:40	I-301 (LaGG-3)		27	1 April 1942	17:00	Pe-2	
17	17 March 1942	15:40	I-301 (LaGG-3)		28	1 April 1942	17:10	Pe-2	
18	19 March 1942	16:05	U-2		29	4 April 1942	17:20	I-61 (MiG-3)	
19	20 March 1942	09:30	I-61 (MiG-3)		30	5 April 1942	16:15	I-301 (LaGG-3)	1 km (0.62 mi) west of Borki
– 3. Staffel of Jagdgeschwader 3 – Eastern Front — June – July 1942
31	3 June 1942	17:40	MiG-1		41	3 July 1942	10:05	MiG-1	
32	11 June 1942	05:25	Il-2		42	5 July 1942	19:03	Yak-4	
33	13 June 1942	12:13	LaGG-3	20 km (12 mi) northeast of Kupiansk	43	9 July 1942	05:06	MiG-1	
34	13 June 1942	12:17	MiG-1	20 km (12 mi) northwest of Kupiansk	44	12 July 1942	10:55	U-2	
35	22 June 1942	06:45	MiG-1		45	17 July 1942	05:15	R-5	
36	22 June 1942	12:55	MiG-1		46	17 July 1942	05:40	MiG-1	
37	22 June 1942	13:00	MiG-1		47	17 July 1942	05:50	MiG-1	
38	22 June 1942	13:10	MiG-1		48	21 July 1942	08:35	MiG-1	
39	28 June 1942	03:35	MiG-1		49	21 July 1942	08:56	Il-2	
40	29 June 1942	17:05	Il-2		50	21 July 1942	09:01	Il-2	Stalino
– 2. Staffel of Jagdgeschwader 3 – Eastern Front — August 1942
51	8 August 1942	10:53	Su-2 (Seversky)	PQ 35 Ost 39364; 15 km (9.3 mi) south-southwest of Kalach	57	21 August 1942	11:05	MiG-1	PQ 35 Ost 30822; 50 km (31 mi) east-southeast of Kletskaya
52	12 August 1942	04:25	LaGG-3	PQ 35 Ost 3946	58	21 August 1942	11:15	Pe-2	35 km (22 mi) northeast of Kalach; 10 km (6.2 mi) north of Pitomnik
53	12 August 1942	04:28	LaGG-3	PQ 35 Ost 4931, Karpovka	59	26 August 1942	08:45	Yak-7	PQ 35 Ost 49241; 5–10 km (3.1–6.2 mi) northeast of Stalingrad
54	13 August 1942	17:50	LaGG-3	PQ 35 Ost 39423; 15 km (9.3 mi) southwest of Pitomnik	60	28 August 1942	05:15	MiG-1	PQ 35 Ost 49251, northeast of Stalingrad; 20 km (12 mi) east-northeast of Stalingrad
55	13 August 1942	17:55	LaGG-3? (Note: According to Mathews and Foreman claimed as a Mikoyan-Gurevich MiG-1.)	PQ 35 Ost 49312; 10 km (6.2 mi) southwest of Bassargino	61	28 August 1942	05:17	I-180 (Yak-7)	PQ 35 Ost 49214, west of Pitschugi; 15 km (9.3 mi) northeast of Grebenka
56	16 August 1942	13:35	MiG-1	PQ 35 Ost 40772	62? (Note: According to Mathews and Foreman this claim in unconfirmed.)	31 August 1942	16:10	Il-2	
– 10. Staffel of Jagdgeschwader 3 – Mediterranean theater — 1–23 July 1943
63	2 July 1943	11:12	B-24	30 km (19 mi) southeast of Lecce	67	12 July 1943	17:10	Spitfire	10 km (6.2 mi) south of Catania
64	2 July 1943	11:30	B-24	60 km (37 mi) southwest of San Cesario di Lecce	68	16 July 1943	13:10	B-24	15 km (9.3 mi) north of Bari
65	12 July 1943	08:15	Spitfire	5 km (3.1 mi) west of Syracuse	69	16 July 1943	13:22	B-24	15 km (9.3 mi) southeast of Palazzo
66	12 July 1943	11:12	Spitfire	30 km (19 mi) south of Licata	70	18 July 1943	13:55	P-38	PQ 14 Ost 70494
– 11. Staffel of Jagdgeschwader 3 – Defense of the Reich — February – 19 April 1944
71	23 March 1944	11:20	B-17	5 km (3.1 mi) north of Hamm	78	11 April 1944	11:00	B-17	PQ 15 Ost S/GB-6 south of Oebisfelde
72	23 March 1944	11:24	P-38	5 km (3.1 mi) northwest of Ahlen	79	11 April 1944	11:04	B-17	PQ 15 Ost S/GC-1 vicinity of Miesterhorst
73	29 March 1944	14:12	B-17	PQ 05 Ost S/GT-2; Steinhuder Meer	80	11 April 1944	13:20	B-17	PQ 15 Ost S/AE-2, Rostock; Rostock
74	29 March 1944	14:18	P-51	PQ 05 Ost S/ES-5; Syke-Bassum	81	13 April 1944	14:05	B-17	PQ 05 Ost S/ST-3 southwest of Wertheim
75	8 April 1944	14:15	B-17	northwest of Braunschweig	82	18 April 1944	14:35	B-17	PQ 15 Ost S/FF; Nauen, west of Berlin
76	8 April 1944	14:20	B-24	north of Braunschweig	83	18 April 1944	14:38	B-17	PQ 15 Ost S/FF; Nauen, west of Berlin
77	9 April 1944	11:40	B-24	PQ 15 Ost S/SH, Rügen north of Rügen					

=== Awards ===
- Iron Cross (1939)
  - 2nd Class (22 June 1940)
  - 1st Class (1 July 1940)
- German Cross in Gold on 11 May 1942 as Oberfeldwebel in the 9./Jagdgeschwader 3
- Knight's Cross of the Iron Cross with Oak Leaves
  - Knight's Cross on 3 September 1942 as Oberfeldwebel and pilot in the 9./Jagdgeschwader 3 "Udet" (Note: According to Scherzer on 4 September 1942 as pilot in the 1./Jagdgeschwader 3 "Udet".)
  - 530th Oak Leaves on 20 July 1944 as Oberleutnant and Staffelkapitän of the 11./Jagdgeschwader 3 "Udet"
