= Gymnasium Bayreuther Straße =

School in Germany

Coordinates: 51.2617°N 7.12939°E

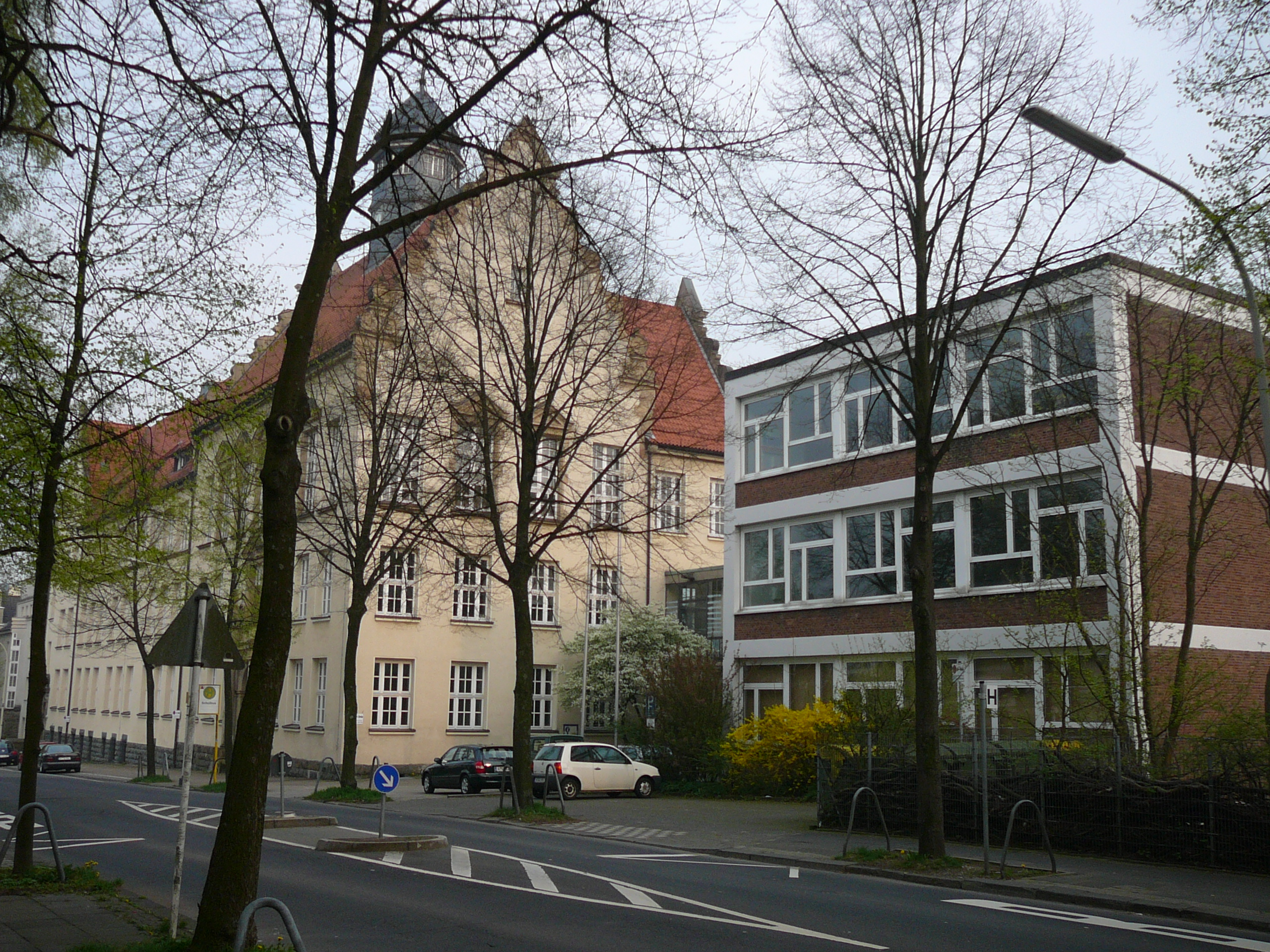
The School

Gymnasium Bayreuther Straße is a school in Wuppertal, Germany. It was founded in 1907.

== History ==
The school was founded in 1907 called Königliches Realgymnasium i.E. zu Elberfeld. It was renamed to Staatliches Reformrealgymnasium in 1918, to Hindenburg Realgymnasium in 1927, to Hindenburg-Schule Staatliche Oberschule für Jungen in 1937, to Staatliches Naturwissenschaftliches Gymnasium Wuppertal-Elberfeld in 1947 and finally it was renamed in 1974 to the current name.

== Integrative class ==
Since 2007 eight students from a special school and sixteen students from the Gymnasium Bayreuther Straße are learning in an integrative class.
