= Focke-Wulf Fw 190 operational history =

History of the Focke-Wulf Fw 190

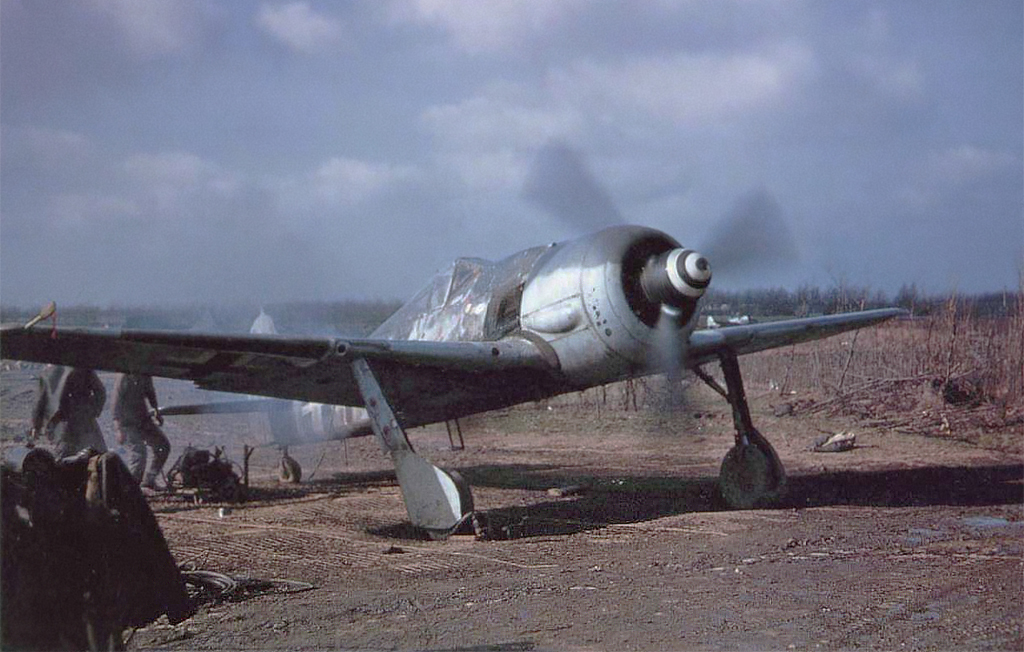
An Fw 190 A-8/R2 in American hands

The Focke-Wulf Fw 190 Würger was used by the Luftwaffe during the Second World War in a variety of roles. Like the Messerschmitt Bf 109, the Fw 190 was employed as a "workhorse", and proved suitable for a wide variety of roles, including air superiority fighter, strike fighter, ground-attack aircraft, escort fighter, and operated with less success as a night fighter. It served on all the German fronts: Eastern Front, Western Front, North African Campaign and the Defence of the Reich.

When it was first introduced in August 1941, it quickly proved to be superior in all but turn radius to the Royal Air Force (RAF) front-line fighter, the Spitfire Mk. V variant. The 190 wrested air superiority away from the RAF until the introduction of the vastly improved Spitfire Mk. IX in July 1942 restored qualitative parity. The Fw 190 made its air combat debut on the Eastern Front much later, in November/December 1942. The Fw 190 made a significant impact seeing service as a fighter and fighter-bomber. The fighter and its pilots proved just as capable as the Bf 109 in aerial combat, and in the opinion of German pilots who had flown both fighters, the Fw 190 presented increased firepower and manoeuvrability at low to medium altitude.

The Fw 190 became the backbone of Jagdwaffe (Fighter Force) along with the Bf 109. On the Eastern Front, owing to its versatility, the Fw 190 was used in Schlachtgeschwader (Attack Wings) which were specialised ground attack units. The units achieved much success against Soviet ground forces. As an interceptor, the Fw 190 underwent improvements to make it effective at high altitude, allowing the 190 to maintain relative parity with its Allied counterparts. The Fw 190 A series' performance decreased at high altitudes (usually 6,000 m (20,000 ft) and above), which reduced its usefulness as a high-altitude fighter, but these complications were mostly rectified in later models, notably the Focke-Wulf Fw 190 D variant, which was introduced in September 1944. In spite of its successes, it never entirely replaced the Bf 109. The Fw 190 was well liked by its pilots. Some of the Luftwaffe's most successful fighter aces flew the Fw 190, including Otto Kittel with 267 victories, Walter Nowotny with 258, and Erich Rudorffer with 222 claimed. A great many of their kills were claimed while flying the Fw 190.

== Western Front ==
=== Early months ===
The Fw 190 was introduced on the Western Front in August 1941. For the first few months of its combat career, the Allies, entirely unaware of the new fighter, attributed pilots' reports of a new "radial-engine fighter" to Curtiss P-36 Mohawks which the Germans had captured from the French. The new fighter outperformed the Spitfire Mk. V, the then top-of-the-line RAF fighter, in all aspects except turning radius. The Fw 190 was considerably better in firepower, rate of roll, and straight-line speed at low altitude. As Allied fighter losses rose and local air superiority over the Channel front passed to the Luftwaffe, Allied plans were tentatively made to launch a commando raid on a Luftwaffe airfield to steal an Fw 190 for evaluation. However, the British acquired an intact Fw 190 A-3 in late June 1942, when a Jagdgeschwader 2 pilot, Oberleutnant Armin Faber, landed on a British airfield by mistake.

As tests confirmed the performance characteristics, British rushed development of the Spitfire Mk. IX with the new two-stage supercharged Merlin 61 engine. The RAF was also quick to study the aircraft for any novel design elements. In particular, the cooling system and installation of the Fw 190's radial engine was a direct influence on Hawker Siddeley's Tempest II.

On the whole, Allied pilots who flew the Fw 190 found it pleasant to fly, very responsive, and, while the cockpit was small compared to most Allied fighters, it was well laid out. Most pilots found the Fw 190's Kommandogerät system (which automatically controlled the RPM, fuel mixture, ignition timing, supercharger switchover, and boost pressure) to be more of a hindrance than a help. German pilots in some instances reportedly failed to pull up from a steep dive at low altitude, diving straight into the ground. It was thought that they had left the powerful, variable incidence tailplane trim mechanism in the "nose heavy" position, meaning that their aircraft could not recover from the dive in time.

=== Cerberus and Jubilee ===
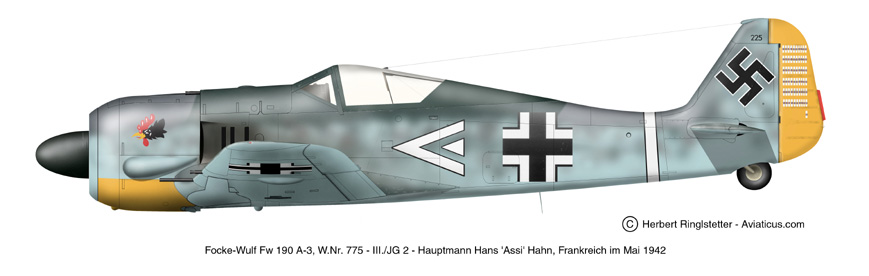
Fw 190 A-3, III./JG 2, Hans "Assi" Hahn, France 1942

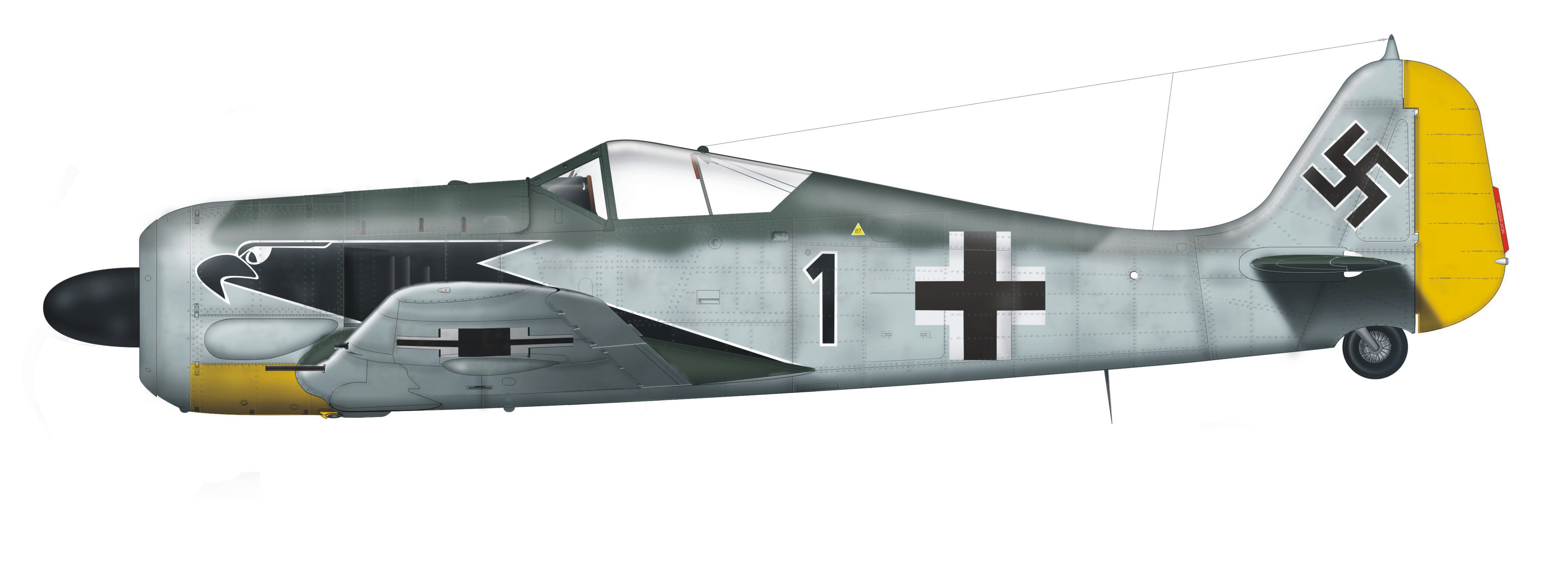
Fw 190 A-4 of I./JG 2 flown by Olt. Horst Hannig, France, spring 1943

The first significant operation in which Fw 190s played an important role was Operation Cerberus, the "Channel dash" break-out through the English Channel and Dover Strait by the Kriegsmarine's small battleships Scharnhorst and Gneisenau and the heavy cruiser Prinz Eugen on 12 February 1942. Adolf Galland, the General der Jagdflieger (General of the Fighter Arm), insisted that the operation take place during daylight hours and accepted responsibility for devising a plan to provide continuous daylight fighter cover against the heavy attacks expected by the RAF. By the end of the day, JG 26 had been credited with seven aerial victories and six probables for the loss of four Fw 190s and their pilots. Adolf Galland was to later call the success of this operation the "greatest hour" of his career.

The Fw 190s first significant mass engagement took place on 19 August 1942, during Operation Jubilee, the Allied raid on Dieppe. Jagdgeschwaders JG 2 and JG 26 had recently converted from the Bf 109, fielding 115 fighter aircraft during the day's fighting, including a small number of high-altitude Bf 109 G-1 models (although there is doubt as to whether G-1 variants existed as operational types). The RAF committed over 300 fighter aircraft, consisting mostly of Spitfire VB models, with just six squadrons of Spitfire Mk. IXBs, and also some of the new Hawker Typhoons. In addition, several squadrons of Hawker Hurricanes and RAF Allison-engined Mustangs performed fighter-bomber and reconnaissance duties. During the action, the two Jagdgeschwader lost 25 Fw 190s to all causes, including crashes, but, in return, they claimed 61 of the 106 Allied aircraft lost that day (JG 26 and JG 2 claiming 40 and 21 respectively). Fighting over occupied territory, the RAF lost 81 pilots and aircrew killed or taken prisoner, against Luftwaffe fighter losses of 20 pilots killed (14 from JG 26 and six from JG 2).

=== Fighter-bomber raids ===
From the end of June 1942, the Fw 190 A-3/U3 Jabo (Jagdbomber, fighter-bomber) equipped 10.(Jabo)/JG 2 and 10.(Jabo)/JG 26, which operated with considerable success attacking shipping and port towns around the south-eastern coasts of England. These high-speed, low-altitude attacks were almost impossible to defend against, as the Fw 190s came in below effective radar coverage and were often gone before RAF fighters could intercept them. The most successful of these fighter-bomber operations was carried out on 31 October 1942 on Canterbury in retaliation for RAF bombing raids over Germany. In the largest daylight raid mounted by the Luftwaffe since the Battle of Britain, about 70 Fw 190s unloaded 30 bombs on the city, killing 32 people and injuring 116, as well as causing a lot of damage to residential properties and shops. Only one Fw 190 was lost over England. The most successful RAF fighters used to intercept these attacks were the Hawker Typhoons and the Griffon-engine Spitfire Mk XIIs, which were both fast enough to catch the Fw 190, especially at low altitudes.

In April 1943, the two Jabo units were amalgamated into Schnellkampfgeschwader 10 (SKG 10) which switched to night operations over southern England, a role in which the Fw 190 proved unsuccessful, taking heavy casualties from the de Havilland Mosquito night fighters. On the night of 16/17 April, on this unit's first operation, four Fw 190s which were attempting to attack London, got lost over Kent. Three of them tried to land at RAF West Malling: Yellow H of 7./SKG 10, flown by Feldwebel Otto Bechtold landed and was captured, his Fw 190 later being evaluated by the RAE at Farnborough; another Fw 190 of 5./SKG 10, flown by Leutnant Fritz Sezter landed several minutes later. When Setzer realised he had landed on an enemy airfield and attempted to take off, his aircraft was destroyed by an armoured car. Setzer surrendered to Wing Commander Peter Townsend. A third Fw 190 undershot the runway and was also destroyed, the pilot escaping with a concussion. The fourth Fw 190 crashed at Staplehurst, killing the pilot.

=== Normandy to Salzburg ===
The Fw 190 also saw heavy action in the 1944 Normandy Campaign. German fighters flew 760 sorties on 6 June 1944 against an Allied total of 14,000. By 10 June, the dearth of specialised ground attack aircraft forces meant the Oberkommando der Luftwaffe (OKL) (High Command of the Air Force) ordered the Fw 190 Gruppen to install bomb racks for these types of operations. Just 24 hours later, the Fw 190 units were asked to revert to air superiority roles again. With conflicting orders and harried by Allied air forces, losses were heavy. In the space of three weeks, 200 Fw 190s and 100 pilots were lost to enemy action. Total losses by the end of June 1944 totalled 230 pilots killed and 88 wounded. Among the casualties was the 173-victory Fw 190 ace Emil Lang. 551 German fighters were shot down, with another 65 destroyed on the ground. A further 290 were damaged. In return, German pilots claimed 526 Allied aircraft destroyed.

The Fw 190 also formed, along with the Bf 109, the core of the German fighter force that participated in Operation Bodenplatte. A total of 35 Fw 190 A-8s, 27 A-8/R2s, 5 F-8s and 50 D-9s were destroyed or lost over Allied lines on 1 January 1945.

== Over Germany ==
=== Wilde Sau ===
From mid-1943, Fw 190s were also used as night fighters against the growing RAF Bomber Command offensive. In mid-1943, one of the earliest participants in the single-engine, ground controlled, night-fighting experiments was the Nachtjagdkommando Fw 190 (Night Fighter Command Fw 190), operated by IV. Gruppe (4 Group), Jagdgeschwader 3, (Fighter Wing 3, or JG 3). The main Nachtgeschwader (Night Fighter Wings) were keen to adopt a new fighter type as their twin-engine fighters were too slow for combat against increasing numbers of de Havilland Mosquito night fighters and bombers. Nachtjagdgeschwader 1 (NJG 1) and NJG 3 kept a pair of Fw 190s on standby to supplement the Messerschmitt Bf 110 and Junkers Ju 88. The considerable performance advantage of the Fw 190 over the other two types was more than offset by the difficulties of operating at night. Few, if any, aerial successes can be attributed to these operational tests.

One of the first purpose built units to use Fw 190s in this role was Stab/Versuchskommando Herrmann, a unit specifically set up in April 1943 by Major Hajo Herrmann. Herrmann's unit used standard A-4s and A-5s borrowed from day fighter units to intercept bombers over or near the targeted city, using searchlights and other visual aids to help them find their quarry. The first use of "Window" by the RAF during the Battle of Hamburg in July 1943, rendered the standard nightfighter Himmelbett procedures useless and brought urgency to the development of Herrmann's Wilde Sau (Wild Boar) technique, pending the development of new nightfighting strategies. Instead of restricting the Fw 190s to ground control interception protocols, the Fw 190s were given a free hand to over-fly bombed areas to see if they could locate bombers using the ground fires below. These tactics became an integral part of the nightfighter operations until May 1944.

St/V Herrmann was expanded to become Jagdgeschwader 300 (JG 300, or Fighter Wing 300), JG 301 and JG 302. All three units initially continued borrowing their aircraft from day fighter units. The day fighter units began to protest at the numbers of their aircraft which were being written off because of the hazards of night operations; the numbers soared with the onset of winter, with pilots often being forced to bail-out through being unable to find an airfield at which to land safely. Crash landings were also frequent. Eventually all three Wilde Sau units received their own aircraft, which were often modified with exhaust dampers and blind-flying radio equipment. Another unit was Nachtjagdgruppe 10 (NJGr 10), which used Fw 190 A-4/R11s through to A-8/R11s; Fw 190s modified to carry FuG (Funkgerät) 217 or FuG 218 radar mid-VHF band equipment.

=== The Sturmböcke ===
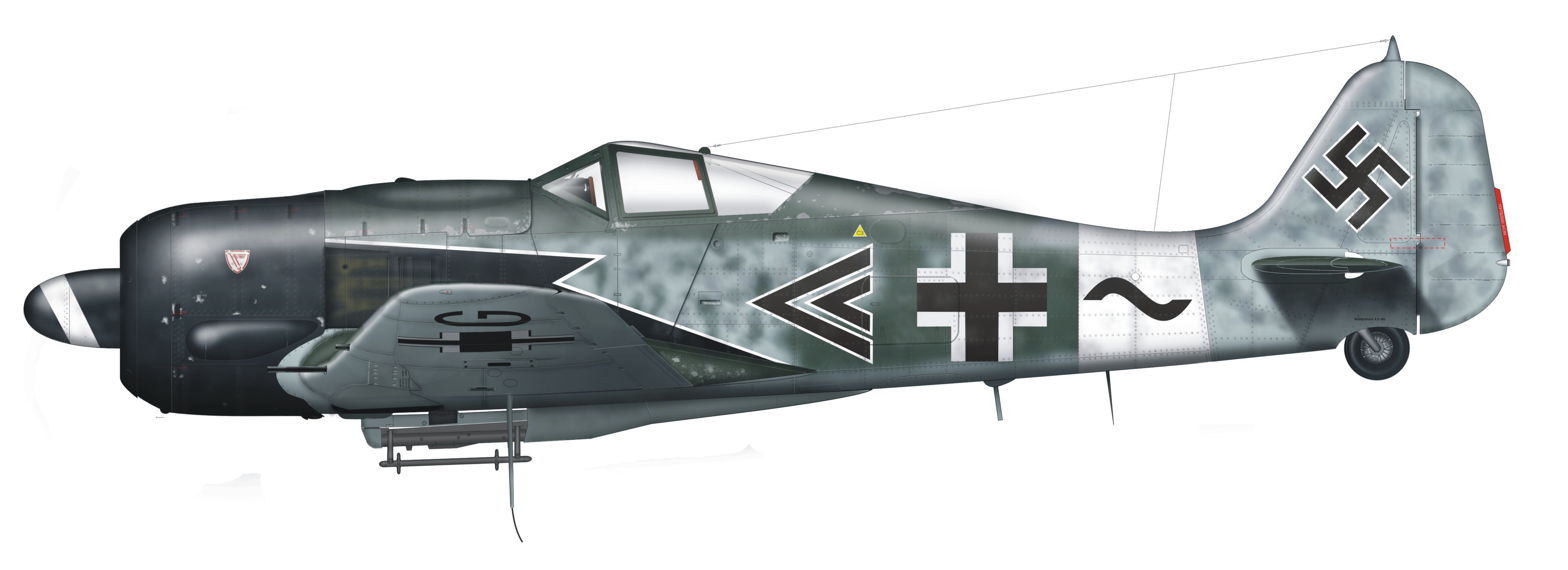
Fw 190 A-8/R8 of IV.(Sturm)/JG 3, flown by Hptm. Wilhelm Moritz

The appearance of United States Army Air Forces heavy bombers caused a problem for the German fighter force. The B-17 Flying Fortress in particular was especially durable, and the armament of the Bf 109 and Fw 190 were not adequate for bomber-destroyer operations. The B-17's eventual deployment in combat box formations provided formidable massed firepower from a hundred or more Browning AN/M2 .50 caliber machine guns. In addition, the Luftwaffe's original solution of Zerstörer twin-engine Messerschmitt Bf 110G bomber destroyers, while effective against unescorted Allied bomber formations, lacked maneuverability and were eviscerated by the USAAF's fighter escorts in late 1943 and early 1944.

Two of the former Wilde Sau single-engined night fighter wings were reconstituted for their use, such as JG 300 (JG 300—300th Fighter Wing) and JG 301. These units consisted of Sturmböcke. However, JG 3 also had a special gruppe (group) of Sturmböcke.

The Fw 190, designed as a rugged interceptor capable of withstanding considerable combat damage and delivering a potent 'punch' from its stable gun platform, was considered ideal for anti-bomber operations. Focke-Wulf redesigned parts of the wing structure to accommodate larger armament. The Fw 190 A-6 was the first sub-variant to undergo this change. Its standard armament was increased from four MG 151/20s to two of them with four more in two underwing cannon pods. The aircraft was designated A-6/R1 (Rüstsatz; or field conversion model). The first aircraft were delivered on 20 November 1943. Brief trials saw the twin cannon replaced by the MK 108 30mm autocannon in the outer wing, which then became the A-6/R2. The cannons were blowback-operated, had electric ignition, and were belt fed. The 30mm MK 108 was simple to make and its construction was economical; the majority of its components consisted of just pressed sheet metal stampings. In the A-6/R4, the GM-1 (nitrous oxide) Boost was added for the BMW 801 engine to increase performance at high altitude. For protection, 30 millimetres (1.2 in) of armoured glass was added to the canopy. The A-6/R6 was fitted with twin heavy calibre Werfer-Granate 21 (BR 21) unguided, air-to-air rockets, fired from single underwing tubular launchers (one per wing panel). The increased modifications, in particular heavy firepower, made the Fw 190 a potent bomber-killer. The A-7 evolved in November 1943. Two synchronized 13mm (.51 caliber) MG 131 machine guns replaced the twin cowl-mount synchronized 7.92mm (.318 cal) MG 17 machine guns. The A-7/R variants could carry two 30mm MK 108s as well as BR 21 rockets. This increased its potency as a Pulk-Zerstörer (Bomber Formation Destroyer). The A-8/R2 was the most numerous Sturmbock aircraft, some 900 were built by Fiesler at Kassel with 30mm MK 108s installed in their outer wing panel mounts.

While formidable bomber-killers, the armour and substantial up-gunning with heavier calibre firepower meant the Fw 190 was now cumbersome to maneuver. Vulnerable to Allied fighters, they had to be escorted by Bf 109s. When the Sturmgruppe was able to work as intended, the effects were devastating. With their engines and cockpits heavily armored, the Fw 190 As attacked from astern and gun camera films show that these attacks were often pressed to within 100 yds (90 m).

Willy Unger of 11.(Sturm)/JG 3 (11 Staffel (Squadron) of Sturmgruppe (Storm group) JG 3) made the following comments:

Advantages; wide undercarriage, large twin-row radial engine which protected the pilot from the front, electric starter motor and electric trim system. Disadvantages; there was a danger of turning over when braking hard on soft or sandy ground. In combat against enemy fighters, more awkward because of the heavy armour plating. Strong at low altitude, inferior to the Bf 109 at higher altitude. In my opinion the Fw 190, in this version, was the best aircraft used in the formation against the Viermots.

Richard Franz commented:

When we made our attack, we approached from slightly above, then dived, opening fire with 13mm and 20mm guns to knock out the rear gunner and then, at about 150 metres, we tried to engage with the MK 108 30mm cannon, which was a formidable weapon. It could cut the wing off a B-17. Actually, it was still easier to kill a B-24, which was somewhat weaker in respect of fuselage strength and armament. I think we generally had the better armament and ammunition, whereas they had the better aircraft.

The number of heavy bombers destroyed by the Fw 190 is impossible to estimate. However, below is a list of the top scoring Sturmbock pilots:

| Name | Total victory claims | Heavy bomber claims | B-17 claims |
|---|---|---|---|
| Georg-Peter Eder | 78 | Est. 36 | unknown |
| Anton Hackl | 192 | Est. 34 | Unknown |
| Konrad Bauer | 57 | 32 | Unknown |
| Walther Dahl | 128 | 30 | Unknown |
| Egon Mayer † | 102 | 26 | 21 |
| Hermann Staiger | 63 | 25 | 21 |
| Willy Unger | 24 | 21 | 13 |
| Hugo Frey † | 32 | 25 | 19 |
| Hans Ehlers † | 55 | 24 | 18 |
| Alwin Doppler | 29 | 25 | 16 |
| Werner Gerth † | 27 | 22 | 16 |
| Friedrich-Karl Müller † | 140 | 23 | 15 |
| Hans Weik | 36 | 22 | 15 |
| Walter Loos | 38 | 22 | Unknown |
| Heinz Bär | 221 | 21 | 11 |
| Emil-Rudolf Schnoor | 32 | 18 | 15 |

==== American fighter response ====
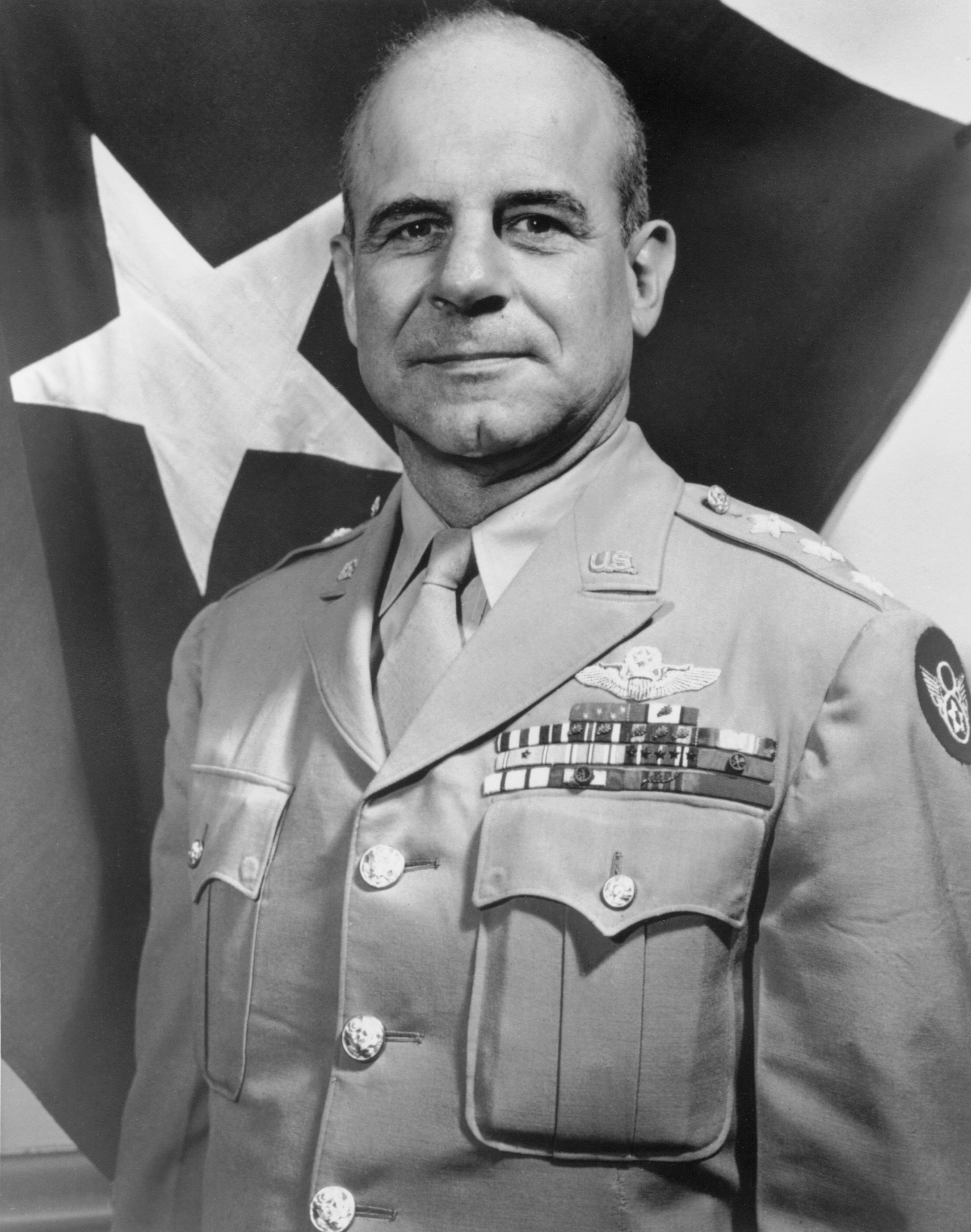
Maj. Gen. Jimmy Doolittle, whose change in tactics stymied the Luftwaffe

During the American daylight portion of the Combined Bomber Offensive, the U.S. fighters who kept in close contact with the bombers they were protecting could not chase any attacking Luftwaffe fighters, instead being forced to turn around and return to the bombers. As a result of the heavy losses, the Allies formulated a response. Major General Jimmy Doolittle took command of the Eighth Air Force in January 1944 and made a critical change to bomber escort policy by "freeing the fighters". Up to this time American fighter pilots on bomber escort missions had been required to remain with the bombers at all times. Instead, they would now fly far ahead of the bomber formations in air supremacy or "fighter sweep" mode on the outward legs, then roam far from the bomber streams "clearing the skies" of any Luftwaffe fighter opposition towards the target. Though Doolittle's policy change was unpopular with the bomber crews, its effects were immediate and extremely effective. Initially this role was performed by P-38s and P-47s, but both types were steadily replaced with the long-ranged P-51s during the spring of 1944.

In response to the American air supremacy tactics, the Luftwaffe organized the units into the Gefechtsverband (battle formation). It consisted of a Sturmgruppe of heavily armed and armored Fw 190s escorted by two Begleitgruppen of light fighters, often Bf 109s, whose task was to keep the Mustangs away from the Sturmböcke Fw 190s attacking the bombers. This scheme was excellent in theory but difficult to apply in practice as the large German formation took a long time to assemble and was difficult to maneuver. It was often intercepted by the escorting P-51s using the newer "fighter sweep" tactics out ahead of the heavy bomber formations, breaking up the Gefechtsverband formations before reaching the bombers.

While not always able to avoid contact with the escorts, the threat of mass attacks and later the "company front" (eight abreast) assaults by armored Sturmgruppe Fw 190s brought an urgency to attacking the Luftwaffe wherever it could be found, either in the air or on the ground. Beginning in late February 1944, 8th Air Force fighter units began systematic strafing attacks on German airfields with increasing frequency and intensity throughout the spring with the objective of gaining air supremacy over the Normandy battlefield. In general these were conducted by units returning from escort missions but, beginning in March, many groups also were assigned airfield attacks instead of bomber support. The P-51, particularly with the advent of the K-14 Gyro gunsight and the development of "Clobber Colleges" for the training of fighter pilots in fall 1944, was a decisive element in Allied countermeasures against the Jagdverbände.

This strategy fatally disabled the Zerstörergeschwader heavy fighter wings, consisting of Zerstörer twin-engine Bf 110Gs, then their single-engined Sturmbock Fw 190 A replacements, clearing each force of bomber destroyers in turn from Germany's skies throughout most of 1944. As part of the new strategy, the USAAF's fighters were free to strafe German airfields and transport, especially while returning to base after the bombers had hit their targets. These additional attacks contributed significantly to the achievement of air superiority by Allied air forces over Europe. However, they were not without cost.

== Eastern Front ==
Against the Red Air Force German aces were able to shoot down large numbers of aircraft. Erich Rudorffer, a 222 victory ace, and Otto Kittel, a 267 victory ace, and Walter Nowotny, a 258 victory ace were the highest scoring Fw 190 aces in the Luftwaffe. Nowotny claimed most of his successes in the Fw 190. Rudorffer destroyed 138 aircraft flying the Fw 190; 13 in 17 minutes on 11 October 1943. Rudorffer scored 136 of his 222 victories in the Fw 190, while Kittel scored all but 40 of his kills in the type. No more than a few hundred Fw 190s were ever in service on the Eastern Front at any one time.

=== Fall Blau to Third Battle of Kharkov ===
The first appearance of the Fw 190 on the Eastern Front occurred in September 1942. During this time, the Battle of Stalingrad was taking place, which would eventually lead to the destruction of the German Sixth Army. The first German unit to receive the fighter in the east, was Jagdgeschwader 51 (JG 51). However, its I. Gruppe was assigned to the north sector, and undertook operations against the Soviets during the Siege of Leningrad in order to allow the Fw 190 to acclimatise. The unit flew free fighter sweeps (Freie Jagd). This lasted only days, and I./JG 51 moved southward to Lake Ilmen to provide air cover for the vulnerable Demyansk pocket survivors. In October 1942 the unit moved south again, this time the Rzhev-Vyazma salient. It was at this location the Fw 190 started to make an impact.

On 10 December the first loss was taken, when Hauptmann (Captain) Horst Riemann was killed in action. Others were also shot down owing to anti-aircraft fire whilst escorting German bomber and transport aircraft dropping in supplies. Pilots that had not obtained relevant results while flying the Bf 109 now increased their scores with the Fw 190. Günther Schack would score a large percentage of his 174 victories in the Fw 190, including 88 Ilyushin Il-2 Sturmoviks. Josef Jennewein scored 86 victories. His tally increased markedly only after he converted on to the Fw 190. In December 1942, Jagdgeschwader 54 (JG 54) also began converting on to the Fw 190. I./JG 54 would produce the fourth and fifth highest scoring aces of the war. Otto Kittel had scored just 39 victories since the start of Operation Barbarossa, in June 1941. The other was Walter Nowotny. Although he had claimed more than 50 kills on the Bf 109, his success in the Fw 190 would see his score rise to 258. Kittel would also go on to achieve 267 victories, all but 39 in the Fw 190.

The Fw 190 would also prove to be a more reliable aircraft, in some respects, than the Bf 109. It handled well on the ground, and its wide undercarriage made it more suited to the often primitive conditions on the Eastern Front. It could also sustain heavier damage than the Bf 109 and survive owing to its radial engine. On one mission in mid-1943, a Fw 190 returned to base with two cylinder heads shot off. During the first phase of the Fw 190's service on the Eastern Front, it served with two other Geschwader (Wings). Jagdgeschwader 26's I. Gruppe was deployed briefly to the front, and Jagdgeschwader 5 (JG 5—5th Fighter Wing) served in northern Norway with the Fw 190. The Third Battle of Kharkov prevented a collapse of the Germans' southern front. The fighting left a salient in the front line near Orel-Belgorod-Kursk.

=== Operation Citadel to the Dnieper ===
The Oberkommando der Wehrmacht (OKW or German High Command) chose to eliminate the bulge of Kursk. Unternehmen Zitadelle (Operation Citadel), planned for the summer, 1943, would be the Fw 190's first major battle in number. By June 1943 the Fw 190 was to reach peak strength. II./JG 54, the main operator, operated 196 fighters before Zitadelle. However, some of this total included Bf 109s still on strength. I./JG 54, I., III., and IV. Gruppe of JG 51 (51st Fighter Wing) mustered 186 Fw 190s (most of the fighter force in this region operated the Fw 190), 88 of them serviceable. The Fw 190 force was assigned to the northern sector near Orel, supporting the German Ninth Army.

In the early morning of 5 July 1943, the opening day of the offensive, the Fw 190s won air superiority over the northern sector. Soviet aviation was held in reserve and its units fed in piecemeal, whereas 1 Fliegerdivision had made an all out effort. The Soviet 16th Air Army (16VA) was permitted to engage only one-third of its fighter force. The German numerical superiority managed to deliver a severe defeat on Soviet aviation on this date. The Fw 190s had the upper hand and shot down scores of Soviet fighter aircraft allowing the German strike aircraft to attack Red Army positions at will. Within a space of a few hours, 50 Soviet aircraft had been shot down. For just 29 casualties, 18 of them destroyed and seven Fw 190s shot down in combat, 1st Fliegerdivision filed claims for 165 victories. The division had over claimed, but Soviet losses were around 100. The Fw 190's performance as a low level air superiority fighter was evident and it reflected the German superiority in the air on that date.

On 6 July the Fw 190 again proved its worth at low altitude. Soviet fighters providing close escort for slow bombers enabled the Fw 190s of JG 51 and JG 54 to attack Soviet formations at will. Fw 190s claimed a ratio in favour of 60:1 on this date; losing two fighters shot down and two damaged while claiming 121 enemy aircraft destroyed. The situation called for a change in Soviet air tactics. Soviet fighters on airfields were placed on alert should larger German formations appear and fighters were now permitted to conduct fighter sweeps in small formations of four to six aircraft. These changes had limited influence of the air battle and not the significant results claimed by Soviet histories. Soviet aviation would still sustain heavy losses. JG 51 and 54 had inflicted heavy damage, the three regiments of 1 DIAD (1st Guards Fighter Division) could field only 26 fighters between them. The 6th IAK (Air Corps) could muster just 48 fighters.

Two main reasons resulted in these loss rates; Soviet pilots were still limited to close escort duty and were not allowed to pursue aircraft into airspace guarded by other Soviet units which restricted their freedom, and when the experience of the German pilots is added, the result was damaging. On 7 July, the 16th Air Army lost 30 aircraft for three Fw 190s destroyed and three crash-landed in German-held territory. On 8 July, the Fw 190 units claimed 74 of the 81 Soviet aircraft claimed destroyed on that date. Actual Soviet losses were 43.

With the German armies now exhausted, the Fw 190 units were asked to perform Jabo, or fighter-bomber missions. JG 54 flew missions in this capacity. Now performing dual purposes, the Fw 190 achieved significant recognition as a rugged aircraft. On 12 July 1943, the 16VA was almost driven from the skies by Fw 190 Geschwader. The air battle had been decisively won by the 1st Fliegerdivision, thanks largely to the Fw 190. However, the ground battle was lost. On 13 July the Soviets launched Operation Kutuzov. The offensive threatened to cut off the entire German Ninth and Second Panzer Armies. Luftwaffe resistance was vital to slowing down Soviet advances. On several days, the Luftwaffe achieved numerical superiority (Soviet aviation was concentrated in the south). The 15th Air Army could not prevent the Fw 190 units gaining air superiority which allowed Ju 87 units to help the Army to restrict the Red Army's break through to the first German defence line on the first day. But the overall situation could not be sustained, as the Soviet ground forces had made several advances further north. Between 1 and 31 July 1943 JG 51 claimed 800 victories against 77 Fw 190s (50 destroyed). JG 54 claimed 450 for the same period for 34 Fw 190s (24 destroyed). Even though it is probable that between 25 and 33 percent of these claims were exaggerations, the statistics confirm the qualitative superiority of tactical air units in combat. More accurate data suggests JG 51's losses were 55 Fw 190s destroyed and 31 damaged. The introduction of the Fw 190 to the front had proven wise. The armament of the Fw 190 was something that was needed by German fighter units. The IL-2 Shturmoviks were becoming available in increasing numbers, and the Fw 190 was an ideal counter to the Soviet aircraft.

The increasing numbers of Soviet armour led to a rethink in how to combat the threat. In the summer, 1943, Ju 87 crews had suffered heavy losses. The Henschel Hs 129 had suffered 495 losses from a total production of 664. It was decided to replace them with the Fw 190. On 18 October, Sturzkampfgeschwader 1, Sturzkampfgeschwader 3 and Sturzkampfgeschwader 5 were renamed Schlachtgeschwader 1, 3 and 5. Sturzkampfgeschwader 2 and Sturzkampfgeschwader 77 were reformed as mixed fighter and dive bomber units. Two Geschwader, Schlachtgeschwader 9 and Schlachtgeschwader 10 were formed to deal with the threat. It was not until March 1944 that the Geschwaders were able to exchange their Ju 87s for the Fw 190. Some units, such as the one commanded by Hans-Ulrich Rudel, continued to fly the Ju 87 (and Fw 190) until the end of the war. In the meantime, the Fw 190 units fought an increasing number of defensive battles. The Lower Dnieper Offensive and Second Battle of Kiev witnessed large scale air battles. During these actions, Walter Nowotny claimed his 256th and final victory on the front, and was nearly shot down himself on 11 November 1943. JG 54, operating the Focke-Wulf, claimed 71 victories in December 1943, for the loss of 14 Fw 190s. This represented a decreasing victory-to-loss ratio. However, the Soviets were gaining in number and quality. The Red Army was pushing back both Army Group South, and soon Army Group North. Only Army Group Centre remained in strong defensive positions. By the spring, 1944, the German fighter units victory to loss ratio had shrunk from 4:1 at the Battle of Kursk to 1.5:1. Soviet fighter aircraft were now equal to the Luftwaffe's best. Schlachtgeschwader losses amounted to 175, which included a number of Fw 190s.

=== Operation Bagration to Budapest ===
By the summer, 1944 the Germans had lost the Crimean campaign and the Soviets were able to pursue operations that would break into Eastern Europe. German fighter units continued to take a heavy toll of Soviet aviation. However, the entry of types, such as Lavochkin La-7 and Yak-3, presented a problem for German fighters. With wings only 9.8 metres long, the La-7 was one of the lightest and smallest fighters of the war. The Yak-3 was faster and more manoeuvrable than the Bf 109 and the Fw 190. According to Soviet tests with captured German fighters, the Yak-9U also out performed the Fw 190. Further, the liberation of the Donbas region improved metal supplies. The Il-2's weakness was its wing and tail structure, which was now made from metals. This contributed to a reduction in losses. The Luftwaffe had a small number of Fw 190s on the Eastern Front by this time. SG 3 and SG 5 was equipped with Fw 190s in June 1944. II./SG 2 was fully equipped with Fw 190s, while III./SG 2 was a mixed unit of Ju 87s and Fw 190s. By June 1944, the German fighter order of battle contained mostly the Bf 109. 1. Fliegerdivision, Luftflotte 6, contained SG 1 and 10 totalling 76 Fw 190s. JG 54, attached to Jagdabschnittfuhrer Ostland (Fighter Area East) of Luftflotte 1 had on strength 32 Fw 190s. 3 Fliegerdivision contained mixed units, including the Fw 190, which were 64 aircraft strong, although the number of Fw 190s is unknown. Luftflotte 4, I. Fliegerkorps contained units from SG 2, 10 and 77 numbering 27, 29 and 33 respectively.

On 22 June 1944, the Red Army launched Operation Bagration. The Schlachtgeschwader were a vital part of German defences. The fluid situation on the ground meant units retreated rapidly westward. Fw 190 units that employed the aircraft as jabo, became the first line of defence as German ground defences broke down. The Fw 190 Gruppen sent a few aircraft out over pre-assigned areas each morning. They were able to identify any movements made by the enemy. The Fw 190s were sent out after enemy armour spearheads that were roaming in the German rear. Usually 250 or 500 kg (550 and 1,100 lb) bombs were used along with SD-2, 4 and 10 bombs and 13 and 20 mm armaments for soft targets. If the Soviet tanks were operating without resistance, then the targets were the soft skin supporting vehicles. Eliminating them would deny fuel and ammunition to the armour, cutting short the Soviets' advance. If the tanks were engaged with German armour, the tanks themselves would be the target to support the defence. The usual approach was made at 1,600 m (6,000 ft), above the reach of light enemy anti-aircraft fire. The Fw 190s would then drop to 4 to 10 m, dropping their loads just as the target disappeared under the nose of the fighter. The delay charge gave the German pilots about one second to get clear. At 485 km/h (300 mph) this was usually enough. In the battles that followed, it was not uncommon for German Schlachtgeschwader pilots to fly seven or eight sorties a day. Towards the end of August fuel shortages kept the German fighters units on the ground. To save fuel, animals, such as oxen were used to carry fighters from dispersal to the take off point. Pilots were ordered to shut down the engine immediately on landing. The OKL managed to scrape fuel together while the battles lasted, allowing some units to fly five sorties per day.

The Schlacht Fw 190s were hard hit. Among those operating the Fw 190 were SG 10, which lost 59 Fw 190s in July 1944. The fighter units fared better. IV./JG 54 claimed 80 aerial kills for 31 losses, 21 to enemy action. However, it seems from loss records that even experienced German units had lost more aircraft than they actually shot down in this period. The jabos maintained intense activity and succeeded in inflicting heavy damage to Soviet forces. On 11 July 1944 200 Soviet vehicles were claimed by Fw 190 units. In Estonia, SG 3 and 4 claimed 400 Soviet vehicles destroyed on 28 July. The German air units helped slow down the advance into the Baltic states. In Poland the Lvov–Sandomierz Offensive had captured bridgeheads over the Vistula river. The German air units tried to eliminate the foothold. On 28 August the Fw 190s of the Schlachtgeschwader along with Ju 87s claimed to have sunk 28 bridging ferries. The assaults failed to prevent the Soviets from continuing westward. Still, the Fw 190s SG 2 and 77 took advantage of brief moments of air superiority to inflict heavy losses of Soviet infantry, as at times the Red Army's advance was so fast that they outran their air support, allowing the Germans a free hand.

In East Prussia the Luftwaffe sent an 800-strong force under 4. Fliegerdivision. JG 54, operating the Fw 190 fighter versions along with SG 4 supported the German Fourth Army and enabled them to halt the Soviet attempt to crush the Courland pocket. On one day, 27 October, the Fw 190 fighter unit JG 54 claimed 57 aircraft shot down. SG 4 lost 17 Fw 190F ground attack machines. On 28 October, Erich Rudorffer claimed 11 victories, reaching a total of 209. Fw 190s of JG 54 claimed 600 victories between 14 September and 24 November, while the Soviet units reported a total loss of 779 aircraft. The crisis on the Eastern Front now required all available units to return to the theatre. The Battle of the Bulge in the Western theatre was still ongoing, but with the Siege of Budapest and the Soviet winter offensive about to strike across the Polish plain, Luftflotte 6 was rushed from the Ardennes sector to Poland to meet the Soviet threat. It brought with it some 100 Fw 190s.

=== Hungarian Fw 190 operations (November 1944–1945) ===
On 8 November 1944, Germany delivered sixteen Fw 190 F-8 fighters (G5+01 and G5+02) to the Hungarian Royal Air Force for training. They were initially based in Börgönd, near Lake Balaton, under the command of Lfl. Kdo 4, Fliegerführer 102 Hungarn/VIII Fliegerkorps (HQ in Debrecen). A number of recruits from the Önálló Zuhanóbombazó Osztály (independent dive bomber wing) based at same airfield were sent to Flugzeugführerschule B2 in Neuruppin for ground attack and air combat training in the Fw 190. At the same time, Hungary established the 101. Csatarepülő Osztály as a specialized Fw 190 operational training unit. The Hungarian 190s were originally intended for use on the Eastern front in offensive actions against Soviet armored units along with other Hungarian dive bomber and anti-tank units. In the end, they were used only over Hungarian soil in defensive operations against USAAF and Soviet Air force units. In addition, a small numbers of Fw 190 G fighter-bombers were used in air-to-ground operations, additionally, the Luftwaffe transfer Fw 190 F-8 and F-9s of I., II., VI. and Stab of S.G.2 to Hungary for operated along with Hungarian units in that period.

Originally, these aircraft served with the 102. Vadászbombázó. This unit entered combat on 16 November 1944 under the command of Captain Lévay Győző. It would successfully operate Fw 190s until the final days of the war. The fighters were also intended to collaborate with Luftflotte 4 under the designation Ung.JSt.102/1 and /2 along with Hungarian Me 210 Cs and Fw 190 Gs operating from airfields in Poland during June 1944, but the course of operations changed the plans to defensive actions.

Fw 190s were flown by Section Leader Horváth Sándor (aircraft ID W-521) and Sergeant F. Timler, (aircraft IDs W-510 and W-520), who were awarded the Iron Cross 2nd Class with Oak Leaves for downing an A-20 Boston over the Esztergom on 26 January 1945. Another Fw 190, W-524, was based in Siedmiogrod, during the winter of 1944. On 7 March 1945, an order from Fliegerkorps IV directed that Hungarian aircraft be painted with a 50 cm wide yellow band on the nose and fuselage and a yellow rudder to aid in identification by other Axis units.

In 1945, during the final months of the war, Fw 190s of the 102. Csatarepülő Osztály together with the 102/1.Zuhanóbombázó század, 102/2 Zuhanóbombázó Osztály "Coconut" (dive-bomber units equipped with Junkers Ju 87Ds), 102.Gyorsbombázó, 102/2.Szazad "Tigris" (a dive bomber and anti tank unit operating Messerschmitt Me 210Ca-1s and Henschel Hs 129Bs), and 101/1 század "Puma" (fighter squadron flying Bf 109 Gs) defended Hungary against fleets of Soviet and American heavy bombers and fighters.

=== Silesia to Berlin ===
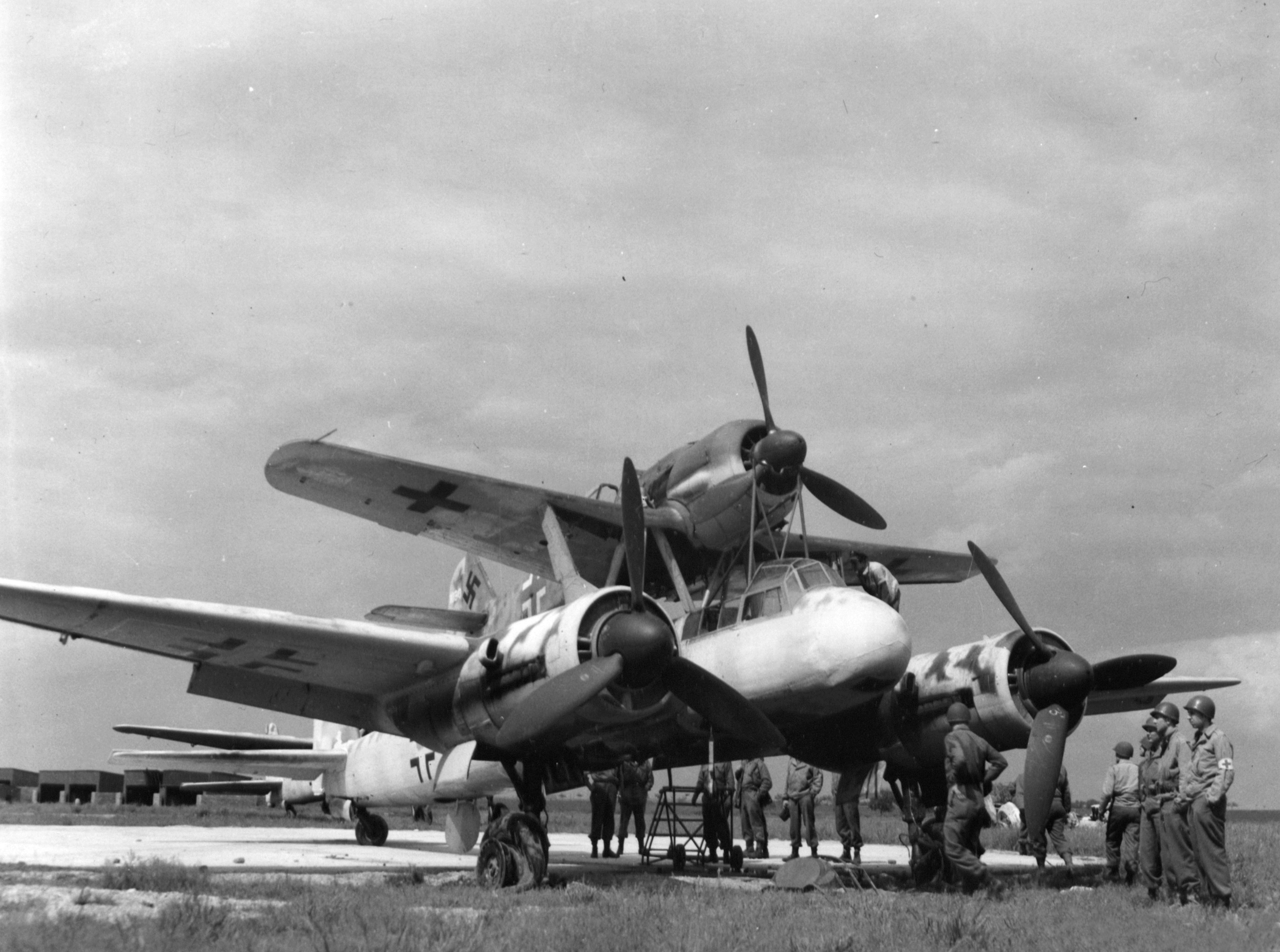
A captured Mistel 3C; this combination was used to train Fw 190 pilots to fly Mistels and used an Fw 190 F-8 (note lack of wing armament) on top of a Junkers Ju 88G-10 nightfighter. United States Army personnel are examining the aircraft.

In January 1945 the Soviets began a series of offensives in its drive to Berlin. The Lower Silesian Offensive and Upper Silesian Offensives and the vital Vistula-Oder Offensive was designed to bring the Red Army to the eastern border of Germany. The Soviets began their offensive early, to take the pressure off the Western Allies in the Ardennes. For the Fw 190s units, the initial stages were to prove tactically successful. The Soviets were forced to start offensive action under severe weather conditions. Airfields were reduced to mud-baths owing to heavy rains, and open country became impassable owing after use by large numbers of vehicles. The Red Air Force suffered more losses to accidents than combat. The Soviet armour was forced to use the few hard-surface roads to continue their advance. These routes were easily detected by German Schlachtgeschwader. The Germans, by contrast, had hard surface runways in German territory and large hangars for aircraft. On 26 January 800 vehicles, 14 tanks and 40 artillery pieces were claimed among the crammed highways. After two weeks, the offensive slowed. Fw 190 units in particular exacted a heavy toll of Soviet infantry; attacking in waves of seven to nine, unchallenged. Overall, the Germans claimed 2,000 vehicles and 51 tanks in the first three days of February. However, this came at a cost of 107 aircraft in nearly 3,000 attacks. The largest concentration of German air forces since 1940 was amassed against the Soviets, which saw the Germans gain air supremacy briefly, contributing to saving Berlin from capture sooner. The rapid construction of concrete runways allowed the Soviets to win back "aerial superiority". On 14 or 16 February 1945 Otto Kittel became the most successful Luftwaffe ace to be killed in action; Kittel had achieved 267 victories on the Eastern Front, all but 39 in the Fw 190.

By March and April the situation had become desperate for German forces. The Soviets had reached the Oder and were encroaching upon Berlin. Fw 190s were now used in unusual ways to destroy the Soviet bridgeheads across the Oder. Focke-Wulfs were attached the upper fuselage of a Junkers Ju 88 "host" by struts which also contained control cables to allow the Fw 190 pilot to fly the combination using his flight controls. The operational versions of the Mistel replaced the cockpit section of the Ju 88 with a shaped, hollow charge warhead weighing, in total, 3,500 kg – the weight of the explosives was 1,700 kg. The Fw 190 pilot would approach to within a few kilometers of the target, aim the Ju 88 at the bridges, then release his Fw 190 and escape while the Ju 88 flew into the target. These weapons, which, in some versions, used a Bf 109 F-4 instead of an Fw 190, were used against the vital Küstrin bridgeheads. Küstrin was due east of Berlin, and if it could be held, a Soviet advance on Berlin could be prevented. Several Fw 190 strike units from Kampfgeschwader 200 struck at the bridges throughout April; the maximum effort on 16 April succeeded in inflicting damage to the captured bridges, but none were destroyed. One Mistel was shot down by a patrol of Spitfires of the Canadian 411(RCAF) Squadron. One Mistel did force a partial collapse of the Steinau railway bridge earlier, on 31 March 1945. On 26 April 1945, one last Mistel attack was carried out; of the seven sent to hit the Oder bridges, just two Fw 190s returned. On 1 May 1945, IV.Jagdgeschwader 3 flew its last combat, losing three out of four Fw 190s over Berlin. On this date the Soviet 16th Air Army claimed seven Fw 190s, its last victories of the war.

== North Africa and the Mediterranean ==
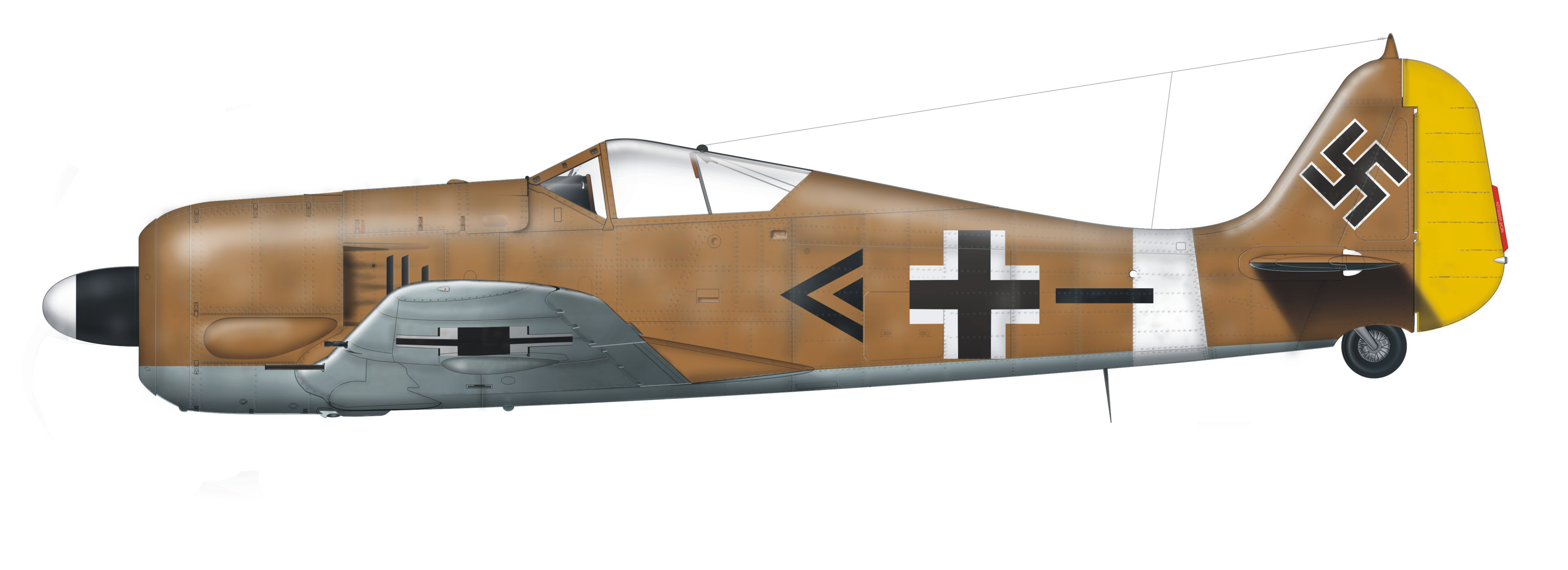
Fw 190 A-4 of II./JG 2 flown by Group Commander Adolf Dickfeld, Tunisia 1942

The Fw 190 was also deployed to North Africa in the period from November 1942 to May 1943. After the end of the North African campaign, it continued to see action from bases in Sicily.

The fighter was a late arrival in North Africa, making its combat debut on 16 November 1942 with Fw 190 A-4/Trop. and A-5/Trop of EprobungsKomando 19 (EKdo 19) departed from Benghazi, Libya at the time of the El Alamein campaign. Over the next six months, the Fw 190 was flown by the units III.Gruppe/Zerstörergeschwader 2 (III./ZG 2), later changed to III.Gruppe/Schnellkampfgeschwader 10 (III./SKG 10) (9./SKG 10/SKG 10 and 11/SKG 10 units based in la Fauconnerie and Sidi Ahmed, Tunisia) and, II.Gruppe/Jagdgeschwader 2 (II./JG 2) (6./JG 2 and 4./JG 2 units detached in Kairouan, Tunisia) among the Stab and II.Gruppe/Schlacht Geschwader 2 (II./Sch.G 2 unit from Protville and El Aounia, Tunisia) from Nov 1942 – May 1943.

These units were equipped with Fw 190 A/Trop standard fighters and A's provided with Us/Rs modifications, but also received some examples of Fw 190s of F/Trop. among the introduction of G/Trop. models also used in assorted types of roles in that stage of the war. In particular, joining with III/SKG 10 and II/Sch.G 2's Fw 190s operated examples of Messerschmitt Me 210A/C and Me 410A Hornisse heavy fighters, among examples of the dedicated Henschel Hs 129B ground attack aircraft respectively during that period.

Many aerial victories were achieved and the Fw 190 fighter-bomber pilots demonstrated how effective the Fw 190 could be against ground targets, the III.Gruppe/ZG 2 (renamed III./SKG 10 in December 1942) being particularly successful. This unit operated throughout the Tunisian campaign, and attacked a variety of Allied targets including airfields, harbours, tanks, vehicles, troop concentrations, anti-aircraft positions, and on one occasion, a British submarine. The fighter pilots of II./JG 2 downed scores of British, American and French aircraft, especially during the first three months of 1943, and Kurt Bühligen and Erich Rudorffer became two of the top scorers in the Tunisian campaign.

== Evaluation ==
=== German view ===
Many pilots flew both the Focke-Wulf Fw 190 and Messerschmitt Bf 109. Leutnant Fritz Seyffardt, a 30 victory ace, was one of them. Later, he flew in Schlachtgeschwader 2 (Attack Wing 2) and commented:

In 1942, I flew my first Fw 190; I was thrilled with this machine. During the war I flew the Fw 190 A, F and G models, and also the Messerschmitt Bf 109. The difference between the Fw 190 and the Bf 109 was that there was more room in the Focke-Wulf's cockpit and the controls were simpler – for example, landing flaps and trim were electric. Another pronounced difference was the stability of the Fw 190. Thanks to its through-wing spars and wide landing gear the machine was substantially more stable in flight, especially landing on rough fields. At great height, engine performance was inadequate. Firepower was very good.

Hauptmann Heinz Lange, an ace with 70 victories, said:

I first flew the Fw 190 on 8 November 1942 at Vyaz'ma in the Soviet Union. I was absolutely thrilled. I flew every fighter version of it employed on the Eastern Front. Because of its smaller fuselage, visibility was somewhat better out of the Bf 109. I believe the Fw 190 was more manoeuvrable than the Messerschmitt – although the latter could make a tighter horizontal turn, if you master the Fw 190 you could pull a lot of Gs [g force] and do just about as well. In terms of control and feel, the 109 was heavier on the stick. Structurally, it was distinctly superior to the Messerschmitt, especially in dives. The radial engine of the Fw 190 was more resistant to enemy fire. Firepower, which varied with the particular series, was fairly even in all German fighters. The central cannon of the Messerschmitt was naturally more accurate, but that was really a meaningful advantage only in fighter-to-fighter combat. The 109's 30 mm cannon frequently jammed, especially in hard turns – I lost at least six kills this way.

Lange continued:

Its small landing gear made the Bf 109 very sensitive to crosswinds and uneven ground on take off and landing. We had unbelievably high aircraft losses and personnel injuries this way. In contrast, the landing gear of the Focke was stable. When taxiing, visibility forward was worse out of the 190 during take off and landing because these were performed in a tail-low attitude, unlike the 109 which was fairly level at these times. A dangerous characteristic of the Focke-Wulf was that in very tight high G-turns it would sometimes, suddenly and with no warning, whip into a turn into the opposite direction. In a dogfight or near the ground, this could have a very bad result. The Messerschmitt had leading edge slots that hindered this type of stall. My opinion of the Bf 109 G, Fw 190 A and Fw 190 D-9, all of which I flew willingly, is that they were superb aircraft for their day in terms of performance and reliability. I can say for me my first choice of aircraft was the Fw 190 D-9 and my second the [Fw 190] A; the Bf 109 ranks third.

General der Jagdflieger Adolf Galland offered another balanced evaluation,

The pilots liked the Fw 190 very much as far as handling, performance and armament was concerned. Compared with the Bf 109 series of the time, the Fw 190 was superior, but this did not hold true at altitudes above 8,000 metres (25,000 feet). Especially against bombers the Fw 190 was by far superior because of its heavy armament, its lower vulnerability, and its better protection for the pilot. All these features were favourable for bomber and schlachtflieger operations.

The evaluation was that the Bf 109 was superior in all around performance "at altitude" [20,000 ft]. The drop in performance was a problem on the Western front during the Defense of the Reich campaign, as most of the fighting took place above 20,000 feet. On the Eastern Front this was not a problem, as the Soviets, like the Germans, undertook combat at low altitude. In a climbing/diving dogfight (below 6,000 m with the Fw 190 A, at all altitudes with the Fw 190 D), the Fw 190 could easily out perform the Bf 109. There were some problems. If the air speed fell below 127 mph (204 km/h) the Fw 190 would stall, drop its port wing, and suddenly flip onto its back. Pilots converting onto the Fw 190 were warned of these characteristics.

=== Western Allied view ===
==== Eric "Winkle" Brown ====
British test pilot Eric "Winkle" Brown flew Fw 190 A-4/U8 jabo version. Brown commented the view from the cockpit was better than in the Spitfire, P-51 Mustang and the Bf 109 owing to the nose down position of the aircraft in flight. The sloping frontal windscreen provided 50 mm of protection. A further 8 mm armoured seat and 13 mm head and shoulder armour afforded the Fw 190 pilot great protection. Take off was easy; 10° of flap and power to 2,700 rpm and 23.5 lb in. boost made the run very similar to the Spitfire IX. Un-stick was found to be 112 mph and the fighter had a habit of swinging to port. Speed in the climb was set at 161 mph, a rate of 3,000 feet per minute. Brown praised the lack of trimming requirements in flight. However, Brown criticised the lack of trim controls. If a member of the ground crew had moved the tab, or it had been adjusted from another source, it could result in an out-of-trim flight performance at high speeds. Brown praised the high rate of roll. Aileron response was excellent from stall up until 400 mph (644 km/h), when they became heavy.

The elevators were heavy at all speeds, particularly above 350 mph (563 km/h) when they became heavy enough to impose tactical restrictions on the fighter as regards to pullout from low-level dives. The heaviness was accentuated because of nose down pitch which occurred at high speeds when trimmed for low-speeds. Brown praised the fighter overall; its control harmony [control surfaces working at once] was superb. The solid gun platform also made it a potent dogfighter. Brown listed some limitations; it was difficult to read and fly on instruments (why is not explained) and it had harsh stall characteristics. Stall speed was a high 127 mph (204 km/h). Stall came without warning. The port wing drops violently that the 190 almost inverts itself. If it was pulled into a G-turn it would spin into the opposite banking turn and an incipient spin was the result. Landing stall on the Fw 190 was much more easily dealt with; the intense buffeting resulted in the wing dropping to starboard gently, at roughly 102 mph (164 km/h).

==== Comparison: Fw 190 A and Spitfire V ====
The British were keen to test captured Fw 190 As during the war. The performance of the German fighter series had caused concern to RAF Fighter Command. Against the Spitfire V, the Fw 190 was found to be better in all respects with the exception of turning radius. At 2,000 ft, the Fw 190 was 25 to 30 mph faster; at 3,000 ft it was 30 to 35 mph faster. Its lowest speed advantage was 20 mph faster at 15,000 ft. At all altitudes it remained the faster fighter. The Fw 190 was also faster in the climb. If a Fw 190 was engaged by a Spitfire V, it could use its superior roll rate to enter a dive in the opposite direction. Its dive speed would enable it to clear the Spitfire. The Spitfire could evade an attack if caught at low speed only by using its advantage in turning circles. If travelling at maximum speed when engaged, the Spitfire could gain speed in the dive, forcing a longer chase, and drawing the Fw 190 further away from its landing ground.

Air Marshal Sholto Douglas expressed concerns that the Merlin-engine Spitfires were coming to the end of their developmental life, whereas the Fw 190 was only just beginning its career. Douglas feared the enemy held the technological advantage and judged the Fw 190 superior to the Spitfire V. The Spitfire IX was also inferior in the climb and acceleration owing to negative G carburation. Douglas' fears would prove overly pessimistic. The Spitfire IX would prove a clear match for the Fw 190 A and the Griffon-engined Spitfire XIV was better. In 1942 several tests were conducted by RAF pilots at the Royal Aircraft Establishment.

==== Comparison: Fw 190 A and Spitfire IX ====
The Spitfire IX restored parity in speed; the Spitfire had an 8 mph advantage at 8,000 ft; 5 mph faster at 15,000 ft; and a 5 to 7 mph advantage at 25,000 ft. The Fw 190 retained speed advantages at 2,000 ft and 18,000 ft where it held a lead of 7 to 8 and 3 mph respectively. In the climb, they were similar, the Spitfire being slightly faster. However, once the 22,000 ft mark was reached, the Spitfire climbing rate increased, while the Fw 190s rapidly fell away. The Fw 190 was faster in the dive, particularly in the initial stages. The Spitfire had difficulty in following in the dive owing to the lack of negative G carburettor. The Fw 190 was more manoeuvrable, with the exception of turning circle. The conclusion was the Spitfire IX compared favourably with the Fw 190 provided the Spitfire had the initiative, it had "undoubtedly a good chance of shooting the Fw 190 down".

==== Comparison: Fw 190 A and Spitfire XII ====
A test carried out with the Fw 190 A and Spitfire XII, with the Griffon engine, suggested the Spitfire had the "superior" acceleration and its speed was "appreciably" faster after brief flights at 1,000 and 2,000 feet. The other speed altitude tests were not carried through owing to weather conditions. Maneuverability was difficult to discern. The Spitfire could easily outturn the Fw 190, but the pilot of the German fighter was reluctant to stall the aircraft at low altitude. It is possible that the difference could have been less marked had the pilot made the effort to make a tighter turn. The cockpit was judged to be well laid out; controls were well harmonised and light; flying characteristics were rated as excellent and no trimming was required; initial acceleration was good in dive and climbs; and the aileron control enabled a rapid roll from one direction to the other. Limitations were; the rough running of the aircraft was disliked and can cause a lack of confidence in the engine. This was unpleasant when flying over water or hostile areas. The engine required long warmups to allow the oil temperature to reach safe levels. The view from the cockpit made taxiing difficult. It was judged that the aircraft was not suitable for quick takeoffs.

==== Comparison: Fw 190 A and Spitfire XIV ====
A short report indicated the Spitfire was 20 mph (32 km/h) faster from 0 to 5,000 ft (1,500 m) and 15,000 to 20,000 ft (4,600 to 6,100 m). At all other heights, the Spitfire had a 60 mph (97 km/h) speed advantage over the Fw 190 A. The Spitfire had a considerably faster rate of climb at all altitudes. In the dive the Fw 190 A gained slightly in the initial stages. The Spitfire could outturn the Fw 190, though in a right-hand turn this was less pronounced. The Fw 190 was far faster in the roll. It was suggested that if a Spitfire XIV was attacked, it should use its fast maximum climb and turning circle to escape. When attacking the Spitfire could "mix it" but should be aware of the Fw 190 A's fast roll rate and dive. If the Fw 190 was allowed to do this, the Spitfire probably would not close the range until the Fw 190 pilot had to pull out of the dive.

==== Comparison: Fw 190 D and Hawker Tempest ====
Shortly after the war the British became interested in the performance and evaluation of the advanced German Fw 190 D-13. While at Flensburg the British Disarmament Wing wanted to see how this fighter would perform against one of their best, a Hawker Tempest. Squadron Leader Evans approached Major Heinz Lange and asked him to fly a mock combat against one of their pilots. Lange accepted, even though he had only 10 flights in a D-9. The mock dogfight was conducted at an altitude of 10,000 ft (3,000 m), with only enough fuel for the flight and no ammunition. In the end the machines were evenly matched. Major Lange assessed that the outcome of such a contest greatly depended on the skills of the individual pilot. At the time Lange was not aware that he was not flying a D-13 but rather a D-9. The same "Yellow 10" (Wk. Nr. 836017) that was previously assigned to Geschwaderkommodore Franz Götz was used in this evaluation. "Yellow 10" was further subjected to mock combat when on 25 June 1945 Oberleutnant Günther Josten was asked to fly a comparison flight against another Tempest. Oberleutnant Hans Dortenmann had claimed 18 aerial victories flying the Fw 190 D-9, making him the most successful Luftwaffe fighter pilot to have flown this aircraft in combat.

=== Soviet view ===
The Fw 190 was considered by one Soviet report to be superior to the Bf 109. The Soviet pilot Nikolai G. Golodnikov claimed the Fw 190 to be inferior to the Bf 109; "It did not accelerate as quickly and in this aspect was inferior to most of our aircraft, except for the P-40, perhaps." Goldonikov said that German pilots appreciated the Fw 190 radial engine as a shield, and frequently made head-on attacks in air-to-air combat. "The plane", noted Golodnikov, "had extremely powerful weapons: four 20 mm guns and two machine guns. Soon the Germans started evading frontal attack against our "Cobras". We had a 37 mm gun, so no engine would save you, and one hit was enough to kill you". A Soviet post-war assessment of a captured Fw 190 D-9 found that the Lavochkin La-5 was a superior fighter in a mock dogfight, although the German machine was praised for the high quality of its wind shield, gunsights, electrical equipment and stability as a gun platform.
