= Herbert Bareuther =

German World War II flying ace (1914–1945)

- Born: 29 July 1914; Asch, Austria-Hungary
- Died: 30 April 1945 (aged 30); Pasewalk, Nazi Germany
- Military career
- Allegiance: Nazi Germany
- Branch: Luftwaffe
- Service years: 1939–1945
- Rank: Leutnant
- Units: JG 51; JG 3
- Conflicts: World War II: Eastern Front
- Awards: Ehrenpokal der Luftwaffe; Deutsches Kreuz in Gold

Herbert Bareuther (29 July 1914 – 30 April 1945) was a World War II fighter ace from Nazi Germany. Bareuther was credited with having shot down a total of 55 enemy aircraft. All the victories he achieved were recorded over the Eastern Front.

== Service ==
Bareuther was born on 29 July 1914 at Asch in Egerland. In early 1939, he joined the Luftwaffe and was posted to Jagdgeschwader 51 (JG 51) in spring 1941 as Unteroffizier. He achieved his first victory over the Eastern Front on 22 June after he shot down a Soviet bomber Ilyushin DB-3. By the end of 1941 he had shot down a total of nine enemy aircraft. He then become involved in flying close air support missions. Bareuther also undertook a lengthy period of fighter pilot instructing. He was promoted to the rank of Leutnant in summer 1944. By the middle of August 1944, he had 44 victories to his credit. But he was shot down over Warsaw in an aerial combat. Bareuther bailed out injured but was captured by partisan forces. Later he was freed by German troops.

In February 1945, Bareuther returned to combat duty in Luftwaffe and served with the IV./JG 3 based on the Eastern Front. While serving with this unit, he achieved his last eleven victories. On 2 April, Bareuther was appointed Staffelkapitän (squadron leader) of 14. Sturmstaffel of JG 3. He succeeded Leutnant Willy Unger who was transferred.

== Death ==
On 30 April 1945, Bareuther was hit by Russian flak undertaking a ground support mission in the Pasewalk area. His aircraft hit a tree and he was killed in the subsequent crash. Bareuther was awarded the Ritterkreuz on 5 May 1945.

== Summary of career ==
=== Aerial victory claims ===
According to US historian David T. Zabecki, Bareuther was credited with 55 aerial victories.

=== Awards ===
Herbert Bareuther received a total of three awards:

- Ehrenpokal der Luftwaffe awarded on 15 February 1943
- German Cross in Gold awarded on 5 February 1944 as Oberfeldwebel in the 3./Jagdgeschwader 51

Herbert Bareuther is listed as a recipient of the Knight's Cross of the Iron Cross in Ernst Obermaier's book Die Ritterkreuzträger der Luftwaffe Jagdflieger 1939 - 1945. However he is not listed in Walther-Peer Fellgiebel's work Die Träger des Ritterkreuzes des Eisernen Kreuzes 1939–1945 nor in Veit Scherzer's book Die Ritterkreuzträger 1939–1945 Die Inhaber des Ritterkreuzes des Eisernen Kreuzes 1939 von Heer, Luftwaffe, Kriegsmarine, Waffen-SS, Volkssturm sowie mit Deutschland verbündeter Streitkräfte nach den Unterlagen des Bundesarchives.

== See also ==
- List of World War II aces from Germany
