= Heinrich Setz =

German World War II flying ace

- Setz as an Oberleutnant
- Born: 12 March 1915; Gundelsdorf, near Kronach, Kingdom of Bavaria, German Empire
- Died: 13 March 1943 (aged 28); Yzengremer, German-occupied France
- Cause of death: Killed in action
- Burial place: Bourdon German war cemetery, France block 32—row 11—grave 427
- Relatives: Franz Ruhl
- Military career
- Allegiance: Nazi Germany
- Branch: Luftwaffe
- Service years: 1936–1943
- Rank: Major (posthumous)
- Units: JG 77, JG 27
- Commands: 4./JG 77, I./JG 27
- Conflicts: See battles World War II: Invasion of Norway; Eastern Front; Operation Barbarossa; Siege of Sevastopol; Battle of Voronezh; Defense of the Reich †
- Awards: Knight's Cross of the Iron Cross with Oak Leaves

Heinrich Setz (12 March 1915 – 13 March 1943) was a German Luftwaffe military aviator during World War II, a fighter ace credited with 138 enemy aircraft shot down in 274 combat missions. The majority of his victories were claimed over the Eastern Front, with six claims over the Western Front.

Born in Gundelsdorf, Setz volunteered for military service in the Luftwaffe of Nazi Germany in 1936. Following flight training and a period at a fighter pilot training school as an instructor, he was posted to Jagdgeschwader 77 (JG 77—77th Fighter Wing) in 1940. Following the Norwegian Campaign he claimed his first three aerial victories in late 1940 in that theater. In July 1941, Setz was appointed Staffelkapitän (squadron leader) of the 4. Staffel (4th squadron) of JG 77 which he led in Operation Barbarossa, the German invasion of the Soviet Union. Following his 43rd aerial victory he was awarded the Knight's Cross of the Iron Cross on 31 December 1941 and the Knight's Cross of the Iron Cross with Oak Leaves on 23 June 1942 after 81 victories. He claimed his 100th aerial victory on 24 July 1942.

In February 1943 Setz was appointed Gruppenkommandeur (group commander) of the I. Gruppe (1st group) of Jagdgeschwader 27 (JG 27—27th Fighter Wing) which was based in France on the Western Front. Setz claimed three more victories before he was killed in action on his 274th combat mission in a mid-air collision with a Supermarine Spitfire on 13 March 1943.

== Early life and career ==
Setz was born on 12 March 1915 in Gundelsdorf near Kronach, Upper Franconia in the Kingdom of Bavaria. He was the son of an Oberförster (head of a forest range) and joined the military service of the Luftwaffe as a Fahnenjunker (cadet) on 6 April 1936. He was promoted to Leutnant (second lieutenant) on 1 January 1938. On 1 July 1938, he was posted to Jagdgeschwader 135 (135th Fighter Wing). (Note: For an explanation of Luftwaffe unit designations, see Organization of the Luftwaffe during World War II.) From April 1939 onwards he was posted to a Jagdfliegerschule (fighter pilot training school) as an instructor. On 3 April 1940 he was transferred to Jagdfliegerschule 3 at Stolp-Reitz, present day Słupsk-Redzikowo Airport in Poland. There he was promoted to Oberleutnant (first lieutenant) on 1 June 1940.

== World War II ==
World War II in Europe began on Friday 1 September 1939 when German forces invaded Poland. Setz was transferred to a front-line unit when he joined II. Gruppe (2nd group) of Jagdgeschwader 77 (JG 77—77th Fighter Wing) on 28 June 1940. There he was assigned to the 6. Staffel (6th squadron) of JG 77 on 1 July 1940. JG 77 at the time was based at Kristiansand, in southern Norway. He claimed three aerial victories in this theater, his first aerial victory, a Royal Air Force (RAF) No. 82 Squadron Bristol Blenheim bomber, was shot down south of Stavanger over Norway's west coast on 27 August 1940. This achievement earned him the Iron Cross 2nd Class (Eisernes Kreuz 2. Klasse) on 12 September 1940. Following two further victories over Norway, he received Iron Cross 1st Class (Eisernes Kreuz 1. Klasse) on 18 October 1940. In May 1941, Setz was appointed Staffelkapitän (squadron leader) of 4. Staffel of 2. (Schul.)/Ergänzungs-Gruppe of JG 77, a supplementary training group for new pilots posted to the front.

=== Eastern Front ===
Following the Invasion of Yugoslavia, JG 77 was moved to Romania in preparation for Operation Barbarossa, the German invasion of the Soviet Union on 22 June 1941. II. and III. Gruppe, plus the Stab (headquarters unit), of JG 77 supported the German advance as part of Heeresgruppe Süd (Army Group South). On 21 June, II. Gruppe was ordered from Bucharest to Roman, a forward airfield near the Siret river. That evening, the pilots and ground crews were briefed of the upcoming invasion of the Soviet Union, which opened the Eastern Front.

In late June or early July, Setz succeeded Hauptmann Walter Jänisch as Staffelkapitän of 4. Staffel of JG 77. There, he claimed his first aerial victory on the Eastern Front, his fourth in total, on a Junkers Ju 87 dive bomber escort mission to Kamianets-Podilskyi. He shot down a Polikarpov I-16 fighter aircraft. On 21 July, II. Gruppe flew thirteen combat missions providing fighter protection for the bridges over the Dniester near Yampol. That day, Setz claimed two I-16 fighters shot down. On the twelfth mission, which started at 18:18 from Bălți, Setz himself was shot down in his Messerschmitt Bf 109 E (Werknummer 1384—factory number), resulting in a forced landing. At the time, the architect of the Holocaust Reinhard Heydrich, who was holding the rank of Major der Reserve (major of the military reserves) within the Luftwaffe, served together with Setz in II. Gruppe of JG 77.

Setz claimed his 30th victory on 29 October 1941 and less than a month later, on 21 November, he shot down his 40th opponent. On 27 November 1941, Setz claimed three aerial victories in combat south of Rostov-on-Don. A Polikarpov I-153 biplane fighter and two Tupolev SB-2 bombers took his total to 45, his last victories in 1941. II. Gruppe was withdrawn from combat operations on 3 December 1941 and moved to Vienna-Aspern for reequipment with the Bf 109 F-4. Setz was awarded the Knight's Cross of the Iron Cross (Ritterkreuz des Eisernen Kreuzes) on 31 December 1941. By end 1941, 4. Staffel had been credited with 110 aerial victories and further 89 aircraft destroyed on the ground under his leadership.

=== Crimea and Caucasus ===
On 11 March 1942, II. Gruppe began relocating back to the Eastern Front, at first to Proskuriv where it stayed for a few days, and then to Sarabuz on the Crimea, arriving on 17 March 1942. Here he became an "ace-in-a-day" on 19 March 1942, claiming his 46th to 50th aerial victory during the Siege of Sevastopol. That day, he was credited with shooting down two Petlyakov Pe-2 ground attack aircraft, two Mikoyan-Gurevich MiG-3 fighter aircraft and one Ilyushin DB-3 bomber. Setz claimed three Yakovlev Yak-7 fighters on 21 April over Prymorskyi against the Crimean Front taking his total to 60 aerial victories. He was again shot down on 3 May, resulting in forced landing of his Bf 109 F-4. He was shot down by pilots from the 9 IAP (Fighter Aviation Regiment—Istrebitelny Aviatsionny Polk) of the ChF (Soviet Black Sea Fleet—Chernomorskiy Flot). On 1 May, II. Gruppe moved to an airfield named Fernheim, located on the Sea of Azov, approximately 15 kilometers (9.3 miles) west-northwest of Kirovske.

On 13 May 1942, he claimed three further victories, two Yakovlev Yak-1 fighters and one Lavochkin-Gorbunov-Gudkov LaGG-3 fighters, taking his total to 70 victories. Following his 81st victory on 23 June, a I-153 fighter, Setz was awarded the Knight's Cross of the Iron Cross with Oak Leaves (Ritterkreuz des Eisernen Kreuzes mit Eichenlaub) on the same day. The award was presented at the Führerhauptquartier (Führer Headquarters) at Rastenburg on 28/29 June 1942. Two other Luftwaffe officers were presented with the Oak Leaves that day by Hitler, the night-fighter pilot Hauptmann (captain) Helmut Lent and fellow JG 77 pilot Oberleutnant Friedrich Geißhardt.

Following his return to the front, JG 77 was assigned to the newly created Army Group B in support of Fall Blau (Case Blue), the Wehrmacht's 1942 strategic summer offensive in southern Russia. On 5 July 1942, II./JG 77 was based at Kastornoje, approximately 75 km (47 mi) west of Voronezh, where it fought in the Battle of Voronezh. Setz briefly commanded II./JG 77 in July for Gruppenkommandeur (group commander) Anton Mader. He claimed two MiG-3s on 23 July 1942. On the next day, 24 July, he reached his 100th aerial victory. He was the 13th Luftwaffe pilot to achieve the century mark. This achievement earned him German Cross in Gold (Deutsches Kreuz in Gold) which was awarded to him on 21 August 1942. On 16 September, Setz, for the second time, became an "ace-in-a-day" after he claimed the destruction of three LaGG-3 fighter aircraft and two Ilyushin Il-2 ground-attack aircraft, taking his total to 133 aerial victories. Setz's 4. Staffel was then reequipped with the Bf 109 G-2 and transferred to an airfield at Stary Oskol on 23 September 1942. On 2 October, 4. And 6. Staffel flew a fighter escort mission for a flight of Heinkel He 111 bombers attacking Soviet positions north of Voronezh. On this mission, Setz claimed two LaGG-3, his last victories on the Eastern Front. This took his total to 135 aerial victories. Setz was promoted to Hauptmann on 1 November 1942. On 7 November 1942, II. Gruppe received orders from Generalmajor Alfred Bülowius, the commander of the 1. Flieger-Division (1st Air Division), to relocate to the North African theater of operations.

=== Western Front and death ===
Setz however did not rejoin his unit. On 12 November he was appointed the new Gruppenkommandeur of I. Gruppe (1st group) of Jagdgeschwader 27 (JG 27—27th Fighter Wing), to replace Hauptmann Gerhard Homuth who had to resign the command because of illness. This unit had formerly led the assault in North Africa but after being shattered in the recent battles around El Alamein had been pulled back for rest and rebuild. Setz took over his command in Bari, Italy on 20 November 1942, and led the transferal back to Krefeld in Germany, where they arrived on 28 November 1942. Command of his former 4. Staffel of JG 77 had been transferred to Oberleutnant Lutz-Wilhelm Burckhardt.

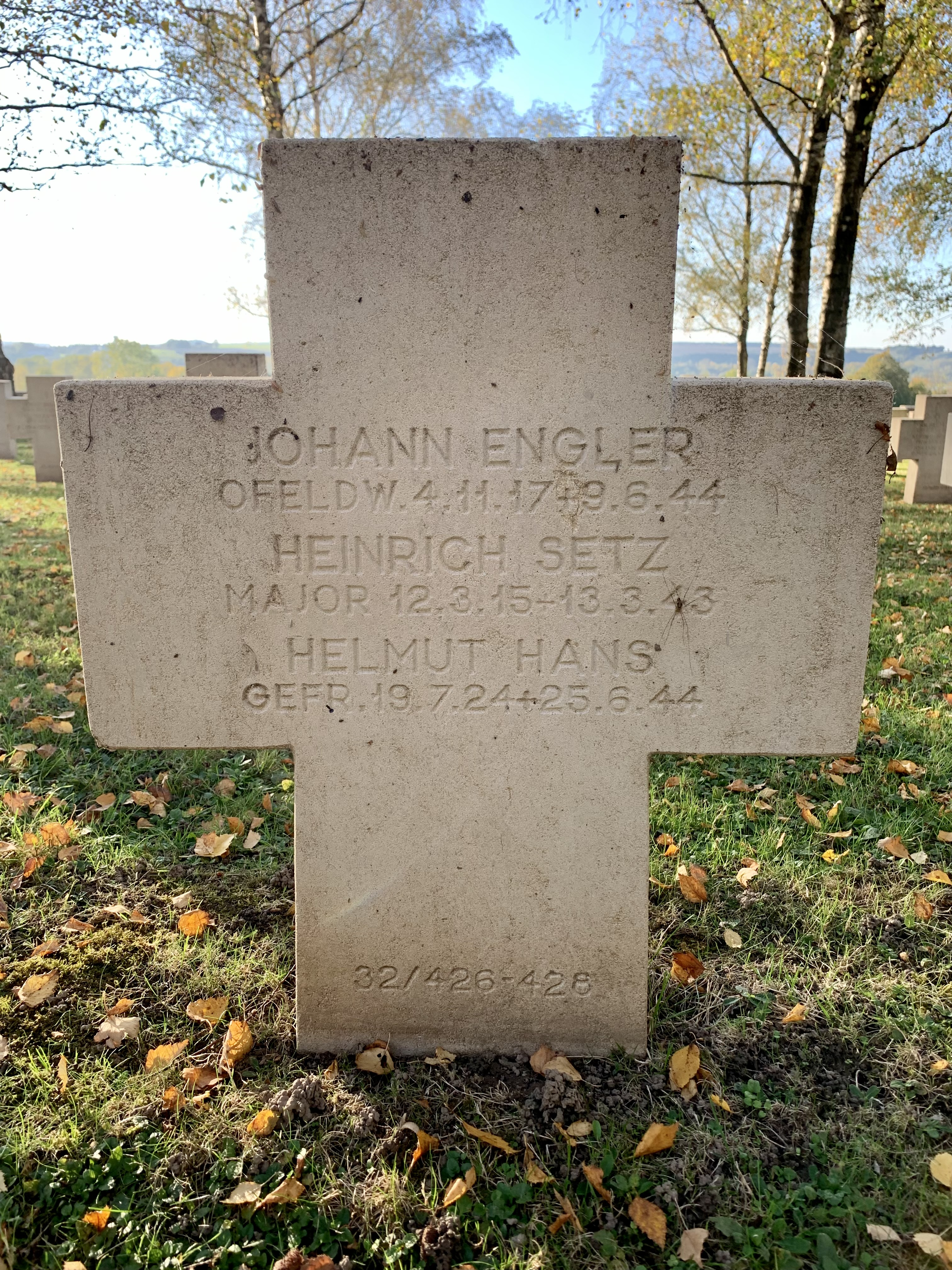
His grave at the Bourdon German war cemetery.

After a brief period of recreation, the group began preparations for a transfer to France on 2 January 1943. Stab, 1. and 3. Staffeln transferred to Évreux Air Field on 31 January 1943. The remaining groups followed and new pilots and new Bf 109 G-4 joined the group. Now fighting a completely different type of air-war, versus the combat box-formations of bombers of the United States Army Air Forces (USAAF) VIII Bomber Command, Setz had the entire group conduct training flights and reported operational readiness on 20 February 1943.

On 13 March 1943, I. Gruppe took off to intercept USAAF Boeing B-17 Flying Fortress bombers. On this 274th combat mission, he claimed two escorting Supermarine Spitfires from the Royal Canadian Air Force (RCAF) No. 127 Wing in five minutes over Abbeville, but it is believed he was killed when he collided with a third fifteen minutes later at high altitude. His Bf 109 G-4 (Werknummer 14 862—factory number) crashed at Yzengremer, 11 km (6.8 mi) east of Le Tréport. In recognition of his leadership, he was posthumously promoted to Major, backdated to 1 March 1943. Setz, who was related to Franz Ruhl, (Note: Depending on source, Setz and Ruhl were either brothers in law or cousins. Stockert lists them as brothers in law, while Dixon and Obermaier state they were cousins.) was interred at the Bourdon German war cemetery in Bourdon, France in block 32, row 11, grave 427. Following his death, Hauptmann Hans-Joachim Heinecke briefly led the Gruppe until Hauptmann Erich Hohagen took command on 7 April.

== Summary of career ==
=== Aerial victory claims ===
According to US historian David T. Zabecki, Setz was credited with 138 aerial victories. Obermaier and Spick also list Setz with 138 enemy aircraft shot down in 274 combat missions, of which 132 were claimed over the Eastern Front, with 3 during the invasion of Norway and 3 over the Western Front in defense of the Reich, and a mission-to-claim ratio of 1.99. Mathews and Foreman, authors of Luftwaffe Aces — Biographies and Victory Claims, researched the German Federal Archives and found records for 133 aerial victory claims, plus three further unconfirmed claims. This figure of confirmed claims includes 128 aerial victories on the Eastern Front and five on the Western Front.

Victory claims were logged to a map-reference (PQ = Planquadrat), for example "PQ 3541". The Luftwaffe grid map (Jägermeldenetz) covered all of Europe, western Russia and North Africa and was composed of rectangles measuring 15 minutes of latitude by 30 minutes of longitude, an area of about 360 square miles (930 km^{2}). These sectors were then subdivided into 36 smaller units to give a location area 3 km × 4 km (1.9 mi × 2.5 mi) in size.

Chronicle of aerial victories
This and the ♠ (Ace of spades) indicates those aerial victories which made Setz an "ace-in-a-day", a term which designates a fighter pilot who has shot down five or more airplanes in one day.
Claim	Date	Time	Type	Location	Unit	Claim	Date	Time	Type	Location	Unit
– Claims with Jagdgeschwader 77 in Norway – Operation Weserübung — April – November 1940
	27 August 1940	—	Blenheim		6./JG 77	2	20 October 1940	11:07	Blenheim	60 km (37 mi) west of Haugesund	6./JG 77
1	9 September 1940	14:22	Skua	northwest of Haugesund	6./JG 77						
– Claims with Jagdgeschwader 77 on the Eastern Front – Operation Barbarossa — June – December 1941
3	26 June 1941	14:25	SB-2		4./JG 77	25	15 October 1941	11:39	I-16		4./JG 77
4	5 July 1941	17:10	I-16		4./JG 77	26	15 October 1941	14:22	SB-3		4./JG 77
5	13 July 1941	10:15	I-16		4./JG 77	27	16 October 1941	10:25	MiG-3		4./JG 77
6	15 July 1941	15:35	I-16		4./JG 77	28	19 October 1941	15:27	biplane		4./JG 77
7	21 July 1941	19:16	I-16		4./JG 77	29	23 October 1941	14:57	SB-3		4./JG 77
8	21 July 1941	19:18	I-16		4./JG 77	30	29 October 1941	14:55	I-15		4./JG 77
9	8 August 1941	13:40	I-16		4./JG 77	31	29 October 1941	15:20	SB-3		4./JG 77
10	10 August 1941	11:37	I-16		4./JG 77	32	31 October 1941	14:10	I-16		4./JG 77
11	14 August 1941	15:20	I-16		4./JG 77	33	2 November 1941	08:00	R-10 (Il-2)		4./JG 77
12	21 August 1941	11:43	I-153		4./JG 77	34	2 November 1941	11:32	MiG-3		4./JG 77
13	27 August 1941	09:30	I-16		4./JG 77	35	3 November 1941	11:32	MiG-3		4./JG 77
14	30 August 1941	08:50	MiG-3		4./JG 77	36	17 November 1941	13:25	MiG-3		4./JG 77
15	31 August 1941	17:22	two-engined bomber		4./JG 77	37	17 November 1941	13:35	I-153		4./JG 77
16	10 September 1941	15:55	MiG-3		4./JG 77	38	20 November 1941	12:00	SB-3		4./JG 77
17	20 September 1941	11:00	I-16		4./JG 77	39	20 November 1941	12:01	SB-3		4./JG 77
18	21 September 1941	15:10	I-16		4./JG 77	40	21 November 1941	13:15	Il-2		4./JG 77
19	26 September 1941	09:51	MiG-3		4./JG 77	41	23 November 1941	11:20	I-16		4./JG 77
20	26 September 1941	14:09	I-16		4./JG 77	42	24 November 1941	12:35	I-16		4./JG 77
21	28 September 1941	—	Il-2		4./JG 77	43	27 November 1941	09:50	I-16		4./JG 77
22	1 October 1941	06:15	Il-2		4./JG 77	44	27 November 1941	11:48	DB-3		4./JG 77
23	9 October 1941	16:18	R-10 (Il-2)		4./JG 77	45	27 November 1941	11:55	DB-3		4./JG 77
24	15 October 1941	08:25	MiG-3		4./JG 77						
– Claims with Jagdgeschwader 77 on the Eastern Front – December 1941 – April 1942
46♠	19 March 1942	08:30	Pe-2		4./JG 77	54	9 April 1942	10:25	I-61 (MiG-3)		4./JG 77
47♠	19 March 1942	08:35	Pe-2		4./JG 77	55	9 April 1942	13:25	I-153		4./JG 77
48♠	19 March 1942	10:15	I-61 (MiG-3)		4./JG 77	56	10 April 1942	10:18	I-153		4./JG 77
49♠	19 March 1942	10:47	I-61 (MiG-3)		4./JG 77	57	18 April 1942	14:40	I-61 (MiG-3)		4./JG 77
50♠	19 March 1942	16:36	DB-3		4./JG 77	58	21 April 1942	11:50	MiG-1		4./JG 77
51	26 March 1942	15:00	I-153		4./JG 77	59	21 April 1942	11:55	I-16		4./JG 77
52	27 March 1942	—	I-153		4./JG 77	60	21 April 1942	16:20	Yak-1	Kerch	4./JG 77
53	9 April 1942	10:20	I-16		4./JG 77	61	30 April 1942	13:28	MiG-1	Sevastopol	4./JG 77
– Claims with Jagdgeschwader 77 on the Eastern Front – Kerch, Sevastopol, Izium — May/June 1942
62	1 May 1942	07:45	I-16		4./JG 77	72	17 May 1942	13:20	I-16		4./JG 77
63	1 May 1942	12:25	MiG-1		4./JG 77	73	20 May 1942	15:30	MiG-1	PQ 3541, Sevastopol	4./JG 77
64	8 May 1942	04:45	I-153		4./JG 77	74	5 June 1942	09:05	MiG-1	Sevastopol	4./JG 77
65	8 May 1942	11:25	LaGG-3		4./JG 77	75	8 June 1942	09:20	MiG-1	PQ 35391	4./JG 77
66	9 May 1942	12:28	I-153		4./JG 77	76	11 June 1942	16:25	Yak-1		4./JG 77
67	9 May 1942	12:32	LaGG-3		4./JG 77	77	13 June 1942	06:20	LaGG-3		4./JG 77
68	13 May 1942	07:53	LaGG-3		4./JG 77	78	14 June 1942	14:49	I-16		4./JG 77
69	13 May 1942	07:59	LaGG-3		4./JG 77	79	17 June 1942	12:53	LaGG-3		4./JG 77
70	13 May 1942	15:21	LaGG-3		4./JG 77	80	19 June 1942	15:42	I-16		4./JG 77
71	17 May 1942	08:18	I-153		4./JG 77	81	23 June 1942	06:25	I-15		4./JG 77
– Claims with Jagdgeschwader 77 on the Eastern Front – 28 June – 7 November 1942
82	9 July 1942	16:20	R-5		4./JG 77	109	3 August 1942	18:50	Il-2	PQ 72221	4./JG 77
83	10 July 1942	17:52	Yak-1	north of Voronezh	4./JG 77	110	3 August 1942	18:14	P-39	PQ 83871, Semljansk	4./JG 77
84	10 July 1942	17:54	Yak-1	north of Voronezh	4./JG 77	111	6 August 1942	18:15	P-39	PQ 83792	4./JG 77
85	10 July 1942	18:02	Yak-1	north of Voronezh	4./JG 77	112	12 August 1942	11:05	Yak-1	PQ 83862	4./JG 77
86	11 July 1942	18:48	LaGG-3		4./JG 77	113	12 August 1942	14:47	LaGG-3	PQ 83791	4./JG 77
87	12 July 1942	05:24	P-40		4./JG 77	114	12 August 1942	14:48	LaGG-3	PQ 83793	4./JG 77
88	12 July 1942	09:19	Yak-1		4./JG 77	115	12 August 1942	09:58	Yak-1	PQ 83861	4./JG 77
89	14 July 1942	11:16	unknown		4./JG 77	116	13 August 1942	10:05	Yak-1	PQ 83833	4./JG 77
90	17 July 1942	18:32	Il-2		4./JG 77	117	13 August 1942	11:00	Il-2	PQ 83841	4./JG 77
91	17 July 1942	18:37	Il-2		4./JG 77	118	13 August 1942	05:11	unknown		4./JG 77
92	17 July 1942	18:38	Il-2		4./JG 77	119	14 August 1942	05:13	unknown		4./JG 77
93	21 July 1942	14:59	P-40		4./JG 77	120	21 August 1942	11:07	Yak-1	PQ 92782	4./JG 77
94	21 July 1942	15:05	P-40		4./JG 77	121	21 August 1942	11:14	Yak-1	PQ 92782	4./JG 77
95	23 July 1942	09:35	Hurricane		4./JG 77	122	23 August 1942	11:12	Douglas DB-7 (Boston)	PQ 82841	4./JG 77
96	23 July 1942	09:40	Hurricane		4./JG 77	123	23 August 1942	11:14	Douglas DB-7 (Boston)	PQ 82853	4./JG 77
97	23 July 1942	18:51	P-39		4./JG 77	124	23 August 1942	11:17	Douglas DB-7 (Boston)	PQ 92774	4./JG 77
98	23 July 1942	18:54	P-39		4./JG 77	125	5 September 1942	17:18	Il-2	PQ 82153	4./JG 77
99	24 July 1942	18:32	LaGG-3		4./JG 77	126	5 September 1942	17:24	LaGG-3	PQ 82142	4./JG 77
100	24 July 1942	18:39	LaGG-3		4./JG 77	127	5 September 1942	17:26	LaGG-3	PQ 82142	4./JG 77
101	26 July 1942	14:02	Hurricane		4./JG 77	128	15 September 1942	10:10	Yak-1	PQ 92512	4./JG 77
102	26 July 1942	14:05	Hurricane		4./JG 77	129♠	16 September 1942	06:40	Il-2	PQ 92353	4./JG 77
103	26 July 1942	17:51	LaGG-3		4./JG 77	130♠	16 September 1942	09:45	Yak-1	PQ 92372	4./JG 77
104	26 July 1942	18:00	LaGG-3		4./JG 77	131♠	16 September 1942	09:50	Yak-1	PQ 92344	4./JG 77
105	28 July 1942	07:41	Il-2	PQ 82231	4./JG 77	132♠	16 September 1942	14:45	Douglas DB-7 (Boston)	PQ 92321	4./JG 77
106	28 July 1942	07:46	LaGG-3	PQ 83882	4./JG 77	133♠	16 September 1942	15:53	LaGG-3	PQ 92424	4./JG 77
107	28 July 1942	15:12	Douglas DB-7 (Boston)	PQ 92343	4./JG 77	134	2 October 1942	08:14	Yak-1	PQ 93684	4./JG 77
108	28 July 1942	15:16	Douglas DB-7 (Boston)	PQ 92363	4./JG 77	135	2 October 1942	08:16	Yak-1	PQ 93672	4./JG 77
– Claims with Jagdgeschwader 27 in defense of the Reich – March 1943
136	13 March 1943	15:10	Spitfire	20 km (12 mi) southwest of Poix-de-Picardie	Stab I./JG 27	138	13 March 1943	15:31	Spitfire	10 km (6.2 mi) south of Gamaches	Stab I./JG 27
137	13 March 1943	15:14	Spitfire	8 km (5.0 mi) north of Neufchâtel-en-Bray	Stab I./JG 27						

=== Awards ===
- Iron Cross (1939)
  - 2nd Class (12 September 1940)
  - 1st Class (18 October 1940)
- German Cross in Gold on 21 August 1942 as Oberleutnant in the II./Jagdgeschwader 77
- Knight's Cross of the Iron Cross with Oak Leaves
  - Knight's Cross on 31 December 1941 as Oberleutnant and Staffelkapitän of the 4./Jagdgeschwader 77
  - 102nd Oak Leaves on 23 June 1942 as Oberleutnant and Staffelkapitän of the 4./Jagdgeschwader 77

=== Dates of rank ===
1 January 1938:	Leutnant (Second Lieutenant)
1 June 1940:	Oberleutnant (First Lieutenant)
1 November 1942:	Hauptmann (Captain)
posthumously:	Major (Major)

== Notes ==
Military offices
Preceded by none: new unit	Squadron Leader of 2.(Schul.)/Erg.Gruppe JG 77; March, 1941 – 6 August 1941	Succeeded by Oberleutnant Hans Brockmann
Preceded by Hauptmann Walter Jänisch	Squadron Leader of 4./JG 77; 6 August 1941 – 11 November 1942	Succeeded by Leutnant Lutz-Wilhelm Burckhardt
Preceded by Hauptmann Gerhard Homuth	Group Commander of I./JG 27; 12 November 1942 – 13 March 1943	Succeeded by Hauptmann Erich Hohagen
