= Hans Grünberg =

German fighter pilot (1917–1998)

- Born: 8 July 1917; Gross-Fahlenwerder, Kingdom of Prussia
- Died: 16 January 1998 (aged 80); Ellerau, Schleswig-Holstein, Germany
- Military career
- Allegiance: Nazi Germany
- Branch: Luftwaffe
- Service years: 1939–1945
- Rank: Oberleutnant (first lieutenant)
- Nickname: Specker
- Units: JG 3, JG 7, JV 44
- Conflicts: See battles World War II: Eastern Front; Western Front; Defense of the Reich
- Awards: Knight's Cross of the Iron Cross

Hans "Specker" Grünberg (8 July 1917 – 16 January 1998) was a German military aviator who served in the Luftwaffe during World War II. As a fighter ace, he was credited with 82 aerial victories in approximately 550 combat missions. The majority of his victories were claimed over the Eastern Front, with 21 claims over the Western Front, including five flying the Messerschmitt Me 262 jet fighter.

Born in Gross-Fahlenwerder, Grünberg served in the Luftwaffe of Nazi Germany. Following flight training, he was posted to Jagdgeschwader 3 "Udet" (JG 3—3rd Fighter Wing) in 1942, operating on the Eastern Front. He claimed his first aerial victory on 19 August 1942. On 9 May 1944, Grünberg was appointed Staffelkapitän (squadron leader) of 5. Staffel (5th squadron) of JG 3 and was awarded the Knight's Cross of the Iron Cross on 9 June 1944. In January 1945, Grünberg was posted to Jagdgeschwader 7 "Nowotny" (JG 7—7th Fighter Wing), the first jet fighter wing where he served as a Staffelkapitän of 1. Staffel. He died on 16 January 1998 in Ellerau.

== Early life and career ==
Grünberg was born on 8 July 1917 in Gross-Fahlenwerder in the Province of Province of Pomerania as part of the German Empire, present-day Ściechów in western Poland. Following fighter pilot training, (Note: Flight training in the Luftwaffe progressed through the levels A1, A2 and B1, B2, referred to as A/B flight training. A training included theoretical and practical training in aerobatics, navigation, long-distance flights and dead-stick landings. The B courses included high-altitude flights, instrument flights, night landings and training to handle the aircraft in difficult situations.) he was posted to 5. Staffel (5th squadron) of Jagdgeschwader 3 "Udet" (JG 3—3rd Fighter Wing) with the rank of Unteroffizier (a junior non-commissioned officer) in May 1942. Initially his commanding officer in 5. Staffel was Oberleutnant Harald Moldenhauer, replaced by Oberleutnant Joachim Kirschner on 1 October. The squadron was subordinated to II. Gruppe (2nd group) of JG 3 headed by Hauptmann Kurt Brändle.

== World War II ==
World War II in Europe had begun on Friday, 1 September 1939, when German forces invaded Poland. In June 1941, German forces had launched Operation Barbarossa, the invasion of the Soviet Union. At the time of Grünberg's posting to JG 3, II. Gruppe had just arrived at Pilsen, present-day Plzeň in the Czech Republic, after service in the Mediterranean theater. Here, the Gruppe was equipped with the Messerschmitt Bf 109 F-4. After three weeks of rest and replenishment, II. Gruppe was ordered to the southern sector of the Eastern Front on 18 May. Based at Chuhuiv, the Gruppe was subordinated to the VIII. Fliegerkorps (8th Air Corps), fighting on the left wing of Army Group South.

Following the Battle of Kalach on 15 August, the German 6th Army attempted to win bridgeheads on the eastern banks of the Don river and advance towards Stalingrad, which then became the Battle of Stalingrad. Grünberg achieved his first victory on 19 August, when he shot down a Soviet Ilyushin DB-3 twin-engine bomber. In December 1942, Grünberg volunteered for the Platzschutzstaffel (airfield defence squadron) of the Pitomnik Airfield. The Staffel, largely made up from volunteers from I. and II. Gruppe of JG 3, was responsible for providing fighter escort to Junkers Ju 52 transport aircraft and Heinkel He 111 bombers shuttling supplies for the encircled German forces fighting in Stalingrad. Flying from Pitomnik Airfield, Grünberg claimed his last aerial victory of 1942 and eleventh in total on 27 December when he shot down an Ilyushin Il-2 ground-attack aircraft.

Grünberg became an "ace-in-a-day" on 5 July 1943, the first day of Operation Citadel, the German offensive phase of the Battle of Kursk. That day he was credited with seven aerial victories. On 16 July, it is possible he became a victim of a female fighter pilot Lydia Litvyak. His Bf 109 G-6 suffered engine failure following aerial combat with a Yakovlev Yak-1 fighter, forcing him to bail out. On 1 August 1943, Grünberg claimed his last aerial victory on the Eastern Front when he shot down an Ilyushin Il-2 ground-attack aircraft. Promoted to Oberfeldwebel (staff sergeant), Grünberg received the Honor Goblet of the Luftwaffe (Ehrenpokal der Luftwaffe) on 9 August followed by the German Cross in Gold (Deutsches Kreuz in Gold) on 31 August.

=== Western Front ===
In early August 1943, II. Gruppe was withdrawn from the Eastern Front for service in Defense of the Reich on the Western Front. The Gruppe spent one-month training in northern Germany before they arrived at the Schiphol airfield near Amsterdam in the Netherlands on 12 September. While based at Uetersen Airfield, the Gruppe received the Bf 109 G-6 which was equipped with Y-Control for fighters, a system used to control groups of fighters intercepting United States Army Air Forces (USAAF) bomber formations.

On 20 December 1943, Hauptmann Heinrich Sannemann, at the time Grünberg's acting group commander, filed a special report requesting his promotion to wartime officer, based on his bravery before the enemy. On 1 January 1944, Oberst Wolf-Dietrich Wilcke, wing commander of JG 3, concurred in the assessment and stated that Grünberg is well suited for promotion to Leutnant (second lieutenant). Lastly, the request was forwarded to Generalmajor Max Ibel, commander of 2. Jagd-Division (2nd Fighter Division), who approved the promotion to Leutnant on 21 January. On 24 February 1944, the USAAF Eighth and Fifteenth Air Force attacked German aircraft manufacturing during Operation Argument, also known as "Big Week". II. Gruppe intercepted west of Gotha, making several passes through the combat box formations. During this encounter, II. Gruppe pilots claimed seven bombers shot and two Herausschüsse (separation shot) —a severely damaged heavy bomber forced to separate from its combat box which was counted as an aerial victory. That day, Grünberg was credited with an aerial victory over a Consolidated B-24 Liberator.

On 9 May 1944, Grünberg was appointed Staffelkapitän (squadron leader) of 5. Staffel of JG 3. He replaced Leutnant Leopold Münster who was killed in action the day before. In April, he had already briefly led 4. Staffel after its commander, Leutnant Franz Ruhl, had fallen ill. Grünberg was awarded the Knight's Cross of the Iron Cross (Ritterkreuz des Eisernen Kreuzes) on 9 June 1944. II. Gruppe flew its last combat mission of the war on 19 November. On 25 November, the Gruppe was withdrawn from combat operations and relocated to Landsberg-Lech Airfield for conversion training to the Messerschmitt Me 262 jet aircraft.

=== Flying the Messerschmitt Me 262 ===
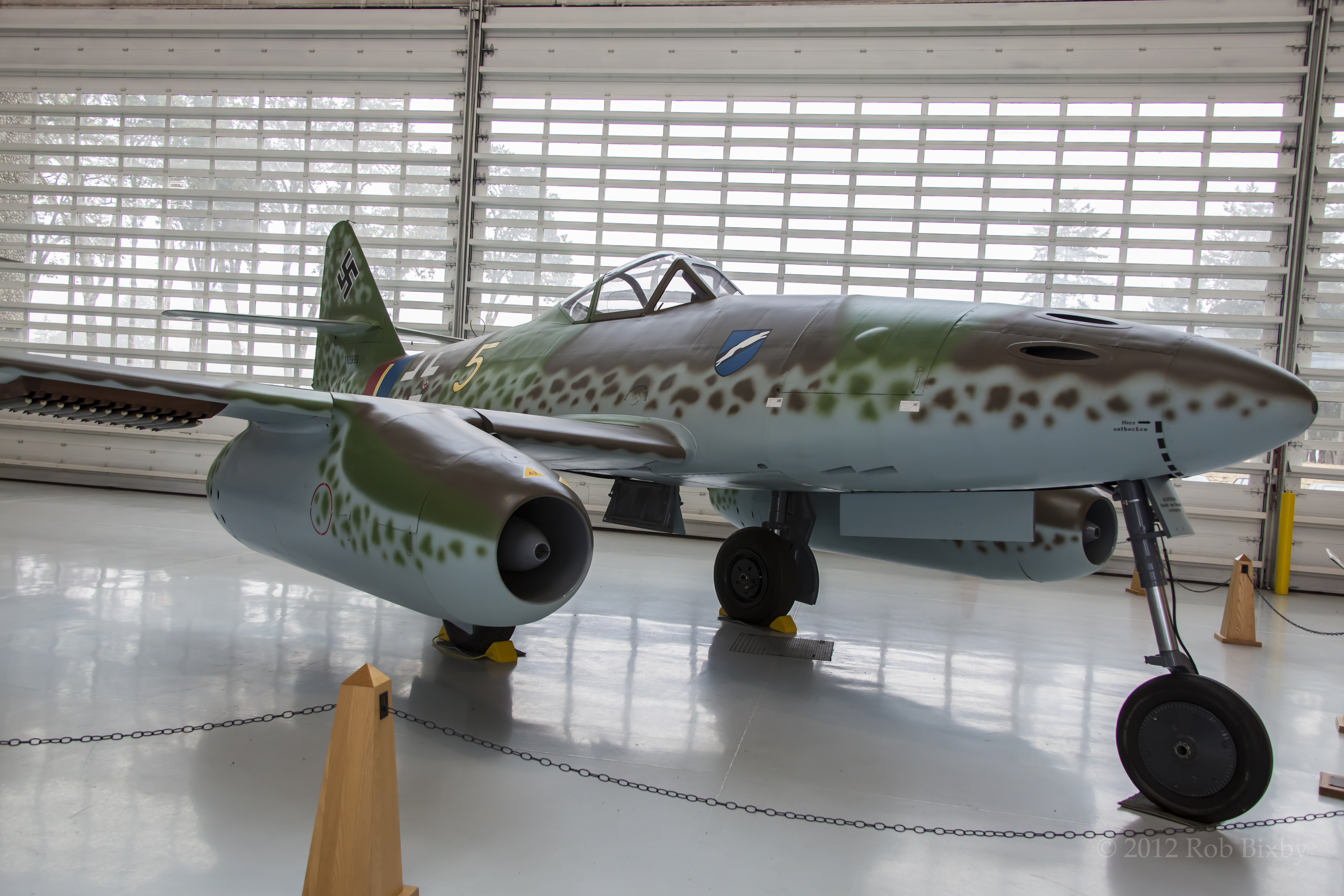
A Me 262 of JG 7 similar to those flown by Grünberg on display at the Evergreen Aviation & Space Museum.

JG 7 "Nowotny" was the first operational jet fighter wing in the world and was named after Walter Nowotny, who was killed in action on 8 November 1944. Nowotny, a fighter pilot credited with 258 aerial victories and recipient of the Knight's Cross of the Iron Cross with Oak Leaves, Swords and Diamonds (Ritterkreuz des Eisernen Kreuzes mit Eichenlaub, Schwertern und Brillanten), had been assessing the Me 262 jet aircraft under operational conditions. JG 7 "Nowotny" was equipped with the Me 262, an aircraft which was heavily armed and faster than any Allied fighter. General der Jagdflieger (General of the Fighter Force) Adolf Galland hoped that the Me 262 would compensate for the Allies' numerical superiority. On 12 November 1944, the Oberkommando der Luftwaffe (OKL—Air Force High Command) ordered JG 7 "Nowotny" to be equipped with the Me 262. Galland appointed Oberst Johannes Steinhoff as its first Geschwaderkommodore (wing commander).

JG 7 "Nowotny" was initially formed with the Stab (headquarters unit) and III. Gruppe at Brandenburg-Briest from the remnants of Kommando Nowotny. I. Gruppe was created on 27 November from pilots and personnel from II. Gruppe of JG 3 and placed under the command of Major Theodor Weissenberger. Weissenberger's appointed Staffelkapitäne in I. Gruppe were Oberleutnant Grünberg, Oberleutnant Fritz Stehle, and Oberleutnant Hans Waldmann, commanding 1.–3. Staffel respectively. In March, 1. Staffel was based at Kaltenkirchen. Grünberg claimed his first aerial victory flying the Me 262 on 31 March 1945. That day, the Royal Air Force and the Royal Canadian Air Force attacked Wilhelmshaven, Bremen, and Hamburg. This attack force was intercepted by 20 Me 262 jet fighters from I. and III. Gruppe of JG 7. At approximately 08:15 Grünberg took off with his Staffel of eight Me 262s and was vectored to a point of intercept over the urban area of Hamburg where Grünberg claimed two Avro Lancaster bombers shot down.

On 10 April, the USAAF Eighth Air Force sent 1,315 heavy bombers against German operations, attacking the airfields at Brandenburg-Briest, Rechlin-Lärz, Oranienburg, Neuruppin, Burg and Parchim. The bombers were escorted by 905 fighter aircraft. The bombers were intercepted by 30 Me 262 jet fighters. In this encounter, Grünberg shot down two Boeing B-17 Flying Fortress bombers. Grünberg claimed his last aerial victory on 19 April. That day, 20 Me 262s from JG 7 and I. Gruppe of Kampfgeschwader 54 (J), the jet fighter equipped Gruppe of the 54th Bomber Wing, intercepted USAAF bombers in the Dresden-Aussig-Pirna area. In the timeframe 12:14 to 12:34, six B-17 bombers of the 3rd Air Division were attacked by Me 262s from JG 7. Five B-17s were shot down, including one by Grünberg. In the second half of April, assumed in the timeframe 17 to 27 April, Grünberg joined Galland's Jagdverband 44 (JV 44—44th Fighter Detachment).

== Later life ==
Grünberg died on 16 January 1998 at the age of 80 in Ellerau, Germany.

== Summary of career ==
=== Aerial victory claims ===
According to US historian David T. Zabecki, Grünberg was credited with 82 aerial victories. Spick also lists Grünberg with 82 aerial victories claimed in approximately 550 combat missions and a mission-to-claim ratio of 6.71. This figure includes 61 aerial victories on the Eastern Front, and further 21 victories over the Western Allies, including 14 heavy bombers, among them five flying the Me 262. (Note: For a list of Luftwaffe Jet aces see List of German World War II jet aces) Obermaier also states that he was credited with 82 aerial victories with 61 on the Eastern Front and 21 over the Western Allies. Additionally, he was credited with destroying 21 trucks, one locomotive and an armoured reconnaissance vehicle. Mathews and Foreman, authors of Luftwaffe Aces — Biographies and Victory Claims, researched the German Federal Archives and found records for 78 aerial victory claims, plus one further unconfirmed claim. This figure includes 61 aerial victories on the Eastern Front and 17 over the Western Allies, including 10 heavy bombers, among them five flying the Me 262.

Victory claims were logged to a map-reference (PQ = Planquadrat), for example "PQ 40793". The Luftwaffe grid map (Jägermeldenetz) covered all of Europe, western Russia and North Africa and was composed of rectangles measuring 15 minutes of latitude by 30 minutes of longitude, an area of about 360 square miles (930 km^{2}). These sectors were then subdivided into 36 smaller units to give a location area 3 km × 4 km (1.9 mi × 2.5 mi) in size.

Chronicle of aerial victories
This and the ♠ (Ace of spades) indicates those aerial victories which made Grünberg an "ace-in-a-day", a term which designates a fighter pilot who has shot down five or more airplanes in a single day. This and the – (dash) indicates unconfirmed aerial victory claims for which Grünberg did not receive credit. This along with the * (asterisk) indicates an Herausschuss (separation shot)—a severely damaged heavy bomber forced to separate from his combat box which was counted as an aerial victory. This and the ? (question mark) indicates information discrepancies listed by Prien, Stemmer, Rodeike, Bock, Mathews and Foreman.
Claim	Date	Time	Type	Location	Claim	Date	Time	Type	Location
– 5. Staffel of Jagdgeschwader 3 "Udet" – Eastern Front — May 1942 – 3 February 1943
1	19 August 1942	12:35	DB-3	PQ 40793 vicinity of Spartak	7	17 December 1942	12:22	Yak-1	PQ 29152
2	15 October 1942	09:26	LaGG-3	PQ 38363; 30 km (19 mi) southeast of Kotelnikovo	8	17 December 1942	12:25	Yak-1	PQ 29173
3	17 October 1942	15:50	Pe-2	PQ 38381; 30 km (19 mi) south of Kotelnikovo	9	20 December 1942	12:36	Il-2	PQ 4939
4	29 October 1942	09:37	LaGG-3	PQ 29784	10	22 December 1942	12:05	Yak-1	PQ 39282, Kalach; 15 km (9.3 mi) west of Pitomnik
5	30 October 1942	08:55	LaGG-3	PQ 28141	11	27 December 1942	13:32	Il-2	PQ 49191 vicinity of Stalingrad
6	30 November 1942	14:00	Il-2	PQ 26232					
– 5. Staffel of Jagdgeschwader 3 "Udet" – Eastern Front — 4 February – 3 August 1943
12	11 April 1943	05:18	I-16	PQ 34 Ost 86774, east of Kijewskoje	38♠	5 July 1943	03:37	Il-2	PQ 35 Ost 60135, east of Kharkiv; 10 km (6.2 mi) east of Kharkiv
13	11 April 1943	05:28	I-16	PQ 34 Ost 86774, east of Kijewskoje; 5 km (3.1 mi) south of Bolschoj Rasnokol	39♠	5 July 1943	03:52	Il-2	PQ 35 Ost 60165, northeast of Kharkiv; 15 km (9.3 mi) southeast of Kharkiv
14	16 April 1943	14:44	P-40		40♠	5 July 1943	04:05	Il-2	PQ 35 Ost 60193, south of Kharkiv; 15 km (9.3 mi) southeast of Kharkiv
15	19 April 1943	17:10	LaGG-3	PQ 34 Ost 85541, southeast of Gelendzhik vicinity of Leprasorium	41♠	5 July 1943	14:05	Il-2	PQ 35 Ost 61362, west of Belgorod; 10 km (6.2 mi) north of Volchansk
16	20 April 1943	11:56	Il-2	PQ 34 Ost 75462, southeast of Novorossiysk; 10 km (6.2 mi) north of Kabardinka	42♠	5 July 1943	18:50	Il-2	PQ 35 Ost 61618, south of Belgorod; 15 km (9.3 mi) south of Belgorod
17	20 April 1943	11:57	Il-2	PQ 34 Ost 75462, southeast of Novorossiysk vicinity of Kabardinka	43♠	5 July 1943	18:55	Il-2	PQ 35 Ost 61618, south of Belgorod; 15 km (9.3 mi) south of Belgorod
18	21 April 1943	11:02	Il-2	PQ 34 Ost 75459, south of Novorossiysk; 10 km (6.2 mi) north of Kabardinka	44? (Note: This claim is not listed by Mathews and Foreman.)	6 July 1943	11:00	Il-2	PQ 35 Ost 61486, southeast of Belgorod
19	21 April 1943	11:07	Il-2	PQ 34 Ost 75461, southeast of Novorossiysk vicinity of Kabardinka	45	6 July 1943	15:10	Il-2	PQ 35 Ost 61486, southeast of Belgorod; 15 km (9.3 mi) east-southeast of Belgorod
20	23 April 1943	14:42	I-16	PQ 34 Ost 85244, east of Cholmskaja; Black Sea, 30 km (19 mi) south-southwest of Anapa	46	7 July 1943	03:42	Il-2	PQ 35 Ost 61473, south of Belgorod; 5 km (3.1 mi) south of Belgorod
21	24 April 1943	05:40	Il-2	PQ 34 Ost 85123, southwest of Mingrelskaja vicinity of Sswobodnyj	47	7 July 1943	03:45	Il-2	PQ 35 Ost 61417, southeast of Golowina; 15 km (9.3 mi) north of Belgorod
22	27 April 1943	13:06	LaGG-3	PQ 34 Ost 85372, east of Gelendzhik vicinity of Gelendzhik	48	7 July 1943	19:43	La-5	PQ 35 Ost 61732, Lipzy; 25 km (16 mi) north-northeast of Kharkiv
23	27 April 1943	17:23	LaGG-3	PQ 34 Ost 86793, Fedorowskaja south of Timashyovsk	49	9 July 1943	06:18	La-5	PQ 35 Ost 62795, vicinity of Kuschetowka; 15 km (9.3 mi) northwest of Prokhorovka
24	28 April 1943	16:22	Yak-1	PQ 34 Ost 85122, east of Krymskaja vicinity of Sswobodnyj	50	11 July 1943	16:32	Pe-2	PQ 35 Ost 62761, vicinity of Iwnja; 20 km (12 mi) southeast of Oboyan
25	29 April 1943	05:32	LaGG-3	PQ 34 Ost 85111, northeast of Krymskaja vicinity of Mertschskaja	51	12 July 1943	05:30	La-5	PQ 35 Ost 62561, south of Oboyan; 40 km (25 mi) northeast of Oboyan
26	29 April 1943	10:16? (Note: According to Mathews and Foreman claimed at 10:06.)	Yak-1	PQ 34 Ost 85151, north of Abinskaja; Abinsk-Achtyrskaja	52	14 July 1943	04:56	Il-2	PQ 35 Ost 61428, northeast of Belgorod; 20 km (12 mi) northeast of Belgorod
27	8 May 1943	14:20	LaGG-3	PQ 34 Ost 85113, north of Mertschanskaja vicinity of Mertschskaja	53	14 July 1943	04:57	Il-2	PQ 35 Ost 61492, north of Schtschebekino; 25 km (16 mi) east-southeast of Belgorod
28	8 May 1943	18:03	LaGG-3	PQ 34 Ost 75261, southwest of Krymskaja vicinity of Krymsk	54	15 July 1943	18:50	Il-2 m.H. (Note: The "m.H." refers to an Ilyushin Il-2 with rear gunner (mit Heckschütze).)	PQ 35 Ost 61882, vicinity of Stary Ssaltow; 25 km (16 mi) north-northeast of Malinovka
29	23 May 1943	06:57	La-5	PQ 35 Ost 62674, Iselezkoje; 25 km (16 mi) east-northeast of Oboyan	55	16 July 1943	06:15	Yak-1	PQ 35 Ost 62856, north of Prokhorovka; 25 km (16 mi) northeast of Prokhorovka
30	31 May 1943	06:41	Yak-4	PQ 35 Ost 70593, west of Radkowskije Peski; 20 km (12 mi) northeast of Izium	56	16 July 1943	08:50	Yak-1	PQ 35 Ost 61223, south of Prokhorovka; 15 km (9.3 mi) east of Prokhorovka
31	4 June 1943	17:50	Yak-1	PQ 35 Ost 70316, vicinity of Starowerowka; 30 km (19 mi) east-southeast of Malinovka	57	23 July 1943	12:30	Il-7	PQ 34 Ost 88286, east of Kuteinykove; 10 km (6.2 mi) south of Jalisawehino
32	8 June 1943	18:20	Yak-1	PQ 35 Ost 70316, Starowerowka; 30 km (19 mi) east-southeast of Malinovka	58	31 July 1943	05:39	Il-2	PQ 34 Ost 88283, west of Marijewka; 10 km (6.2 mi) south of Jalisawehino
33	10 June 1943	05:25	Yak-1	PQ 35 Ost 70318, Malyi Burluk; 30 km (19 mi) east-southeast of Malinovka	59	31 July 1943	05:56	Il-2	PQ 34 Ost 88262, north of Kuibyschewo vicinity of Dmitrijewka
34	16 June 1943	03:54	Il-2	PQ 35 Ost 70141, east of Martowaja; 25 km (16 mi) east of Malinovka	60	31 July 1943	11:21	Yak-1	PQ 34 Ost 88221, southeast of Tschistjakowo; 15 km (9.3 mi) north of Jalisawehino
35	19 June 1943	13:41	La-5	PQ 35 Ost 60434, vicinity of Grakowo railroad station 25 km (16 mi) southeast of Malinovka	61	31 July 1943	11:26	Il-2	PQ 34 Ost Ost 88253, northwest of Marijewka; 10 km (6.2 mi) south of Jalisawehino
36	30 June 1943	17:34	Il-2	PQ 35 Ost 70172, southeast of Petschnenegi	62	1 August 1943	18:53	Il-2	PQ 34 Ost 88235, west of Dmitrijewka; 20 km (12 mi) northeast of Jalisawehino
37♠	5 July 1943	03:30	Il-2	PQ 35 Ost 60234, Bolshaya Babka; 25 km (16 mi) northeast of Malinovka					
– 5. Staffel of Jagdgeschwader 3 "Udet" – Western Front — 1 September – 31 December 1943
63	30 November 1943	11:25	P-47	PQ 05 Ost S/LG-7 vicinity of Neerpelt	— ? (Note: This unconfirmed claim is not listed in the 2008 book by Prien, Stemmer, Rodeike and Bock. However, the claim is listed in 2003 book by Prien and Stemmer as his 63rd aerial victory.)	20 December 1943	—	Spitfire	
– 5. Staffel of Jagdgeschwader 3 "Udet" – Defense of the Reich — 1 January – 6 June 1944
64	24 February 1944	13:50	B-24	Zella-Mehlis	68	11 April 1944	11:08	B-17	PQ 15 Ost S/GC vicinity of Gardelegen
65	23 March 1944	11:20	B-17*	PQ 05 Ost S/KR; Soest	69	18 April 1944	14:33	B-17	PQ 15 Ost S/FF vicinity of Nauen, west of Berlin
66	5 April 1944	15:38	P-51	PQ 14 Ost S/GC-2/7 north-north-east of Königslutter	70	29 May 1944	12:27	B-24	PQ 15 Ost S/BJ-3/BK-1 north of Stettin
67? (Note: This claim is not listed in the 2018 book by Prien, Stemmer and Bock.)	8 April 1944	—	B-24						
– 5. Staffel of Jagdgeschwader 3 "Udet" – Invasion of Normandy — 7 June – 22 August 1944
71	7 August 1944	18:28	P-47	PQ 04 Ost N/BC-7/3; Chateauneuf-en-Thymerais	74	18 August 1944	19:30	P-51	PQ 04 Ost N/TE-1 vicinity of Beauvais
72	14 August 1944	07:26	P-38	PQ 05 Ost S/TH-6 vicinity of Montmirail	75	20 August 1944	15:49	P-47	PQ 04 Ost N/AD-1/4 vicinity of Houdan
73	16 August 1944	17:15	P-47	PQ 04 Ost N/BD-5/9; 120° from Rambouillet					
According to Prien and Stemmer, Grünberg claimed two further aerial victories of unknown type in August 1944. These two claims are not listed by Mathews and Foreman.
– 1. Stafel of Jagdgeschwader 7 – Defense of the Reich — March – April 1945
78	31 March 1945	08:00+	Lancaster	vicinity of Hamburg	81	10 April 1945	—	B-17	vicinity of Oranienburg
79	31 March 1945	08:00+	Lancaster	vicinity of Hamburg	82	19 April 1945	12:00+	B-17	vicinity of Prague
80	10 April 1945	—	B-17	vicinity of Oranienburg					

=== Awards ===
- Iron Cross (1939) 2nd and 1st Class
- Honor Goblet of the Luftwaffe on 9 August 1943 as Feldwebel and pilot
- German Cross in Gold on 31 August 1943 as Feldwebel in the 5./Jagdgeschwader 3
- Knight's Cross of the Iron Cross on 9 June 1944 as Leutnant (war officer) and pilot in the 5./Jagdgeschwader 3 "Udet"
