= Franz Ruhl =

German World War II fighter pilot (1922–1944)

- Born: 12 December 1922; Regensburg, Weimar Republic
- Died: 24 December 1944 (aged 22); Liège, Belgium
- Cause of death: Killed in action
- Relatives: Heinrich Setz
- Military career
- Allegiance: Nazi Germany
- Branch: Luftwaffe
- Rank: Oberleutnant (Posthumously)
- Unit: JG 3
- Conflicts: World War II: Eastern Front; Defense of the Reich †
- Awards: Knight's Cross of the Iron Cross

Franz Ruhl (12 December 1922 – December 24, 1944) was a German Luftwaffe ace and recipient of the Knight's Cross of the Iron Cross during World War II. The Knight's Cross of the Iron Cross, and its variants were the highest awards in the military and paramilitary forces of Nazi Germany during World War II. Ruhl was shot down on 24 December 1944 near Liège, he was posthumously promoted to Oberleutnant. Depending on source, he was credited with 35 to 37 aerial victories claimed in over 200 missions.

== Early life and career ==
Ruhl was born on 12 December 1922 in Regensburg then in the Free State of Bavaria of the Weimar Republic and was related to Heinrich Setz. (Note: Depending on source, Ruhl and Setz were either brothers in law or cousins. Stockert lists them as brothers in law, while Dixon and Obermaier state they were cousins.) He joined the military service of Luftwaffe and following flight training, (Note: Flight training in the Luftwaffe progressed through the levels A1, A2 and B1, B2, referred to as A/B flight training. A training included theoretical and practical training in aerobatics, navigation, long-distance flights and dead-stick landings. The B courses included high-altitude flights, instrument flights, night landings and training to handle the aircraft in difficult situations.) he was posted to the 4. Staffel (4th squadron) of Jagdgeschwader 3 "Udet" (JG 3—3rd Fighter Wing) in late 1942. At the time, the Staffel was commanded by Oberleutnant Werner Lucas and subordinated II. Gruppe (2nd group) which was headed by Hauptmann Kurt Brändle and fighting on Eastern Front.

== World War II ==
World War II in Europe had begun on Friday 1 September 1939 when German forces invaded Poland. On 6 February 1943, II. Gruppe had moved to an airfield at Makiivka. Here on 10 March, Ruhl claimed his first aerial victory when he shot down an Ilyushin Il-2 ground-attack aircraft. Following the German loss in the Battle of Stalingrad, 4. Staffel was relocated to the Kuban bridgehead on 5 April where they were initially based at Kerch and then at Anapa. Here, Ruhl claimed further aerial victories, taking his total to nine by end of April. For these achievements, he had been awarded both classes of the Iron Cross (Eisernes Kreuz).

In May, Ruhl was posted to the Gruppenstab (headquarters unit) of II. Gruppe. While flying with the Gruppenstab in May, Ruhl claimed four aerial victories. On 16 May, the Gruppe relocated from Anapa to Varvarovka, an airfield approximately 90 kilometers (56 miles) southwest of Belgorod. Here, Ruhl claimed four aerial victories in June. In preparation for Operation Citadel, II. Gruppe moved to an airfield at airfield at Kharkov-Rogan. Here, Ruhl, who was again flying with 4. Staffel, claimed three aerial victories, his last on the Eastern Front, taking his total to twenty.

=== Defense of the Reich ===
The increasing daytime attacks of the United States Army Air Forces (USAAF) Eighth Air Force against targets in western Europe forced the Luftwaffe to transfer more and more fighter units from the Eastern Front back to Germany in Defense of the Reich. On 3 August 1943, II. Gruppe's air elements arrived at Uetersen Airfield in northern Germany. The Gruppe spent one-month training in northern Germany before they arrived at the Schiphol airfield near Amsterdam in the Netherlands on 12 September. On 16 September, Ruhl claimed his first aerial victory on the Western Front. Ruhl led a flight of eight Messerschmitt Bf 109s from 4. Staffel on a fighter escort mission for German minesweepers operating off the coast near Den Helder and Texel. When the minesweepers came under attack by Royal Air Force (RAF) Bristol Beaufighters, Luftwaffe pilots claimed two of the Beaufighters shot down, including one by Ruhl.

On 24 September, II. Gruppe for the first time engaged in combat with USAAF bombers. Guided by Y-Control for fighters, the Gruppe intercepted approximately 80 to 100 Boeing B-17 Flying Fortress bombers over sea. During this encounter, Ruhl claimed one of the B-17 bombers shot down. On 8 October. the USAAF attacked the harbor and shipyards at Bremen and the U-boat manufacturing site at Bremen-Vegesack. At 14:08, II. Gruppe was scrambled and took off from Schiphol airfield. The Gruppe intercepted a formation of B-17 bombers and their escorting Republic P-47 Thunderbolt at 15:00 over the IJsselmeer. That day, Ruhl claimed two B-17 bombers on two separate missions shot down. Battle damage sustained to his Bf 109 G-6, resulted in a belly landing at Groningen.

=== Squadron leader and death ===
When on 24 October 1943, Lucas, the commander of 4. Staffel, was killed in action, Ruhl was appointed Staffelkapitän (squadron leader) of the Staffel. Ruhl had already briefly commanded the Staffel in September when Lucas was absent. On 22 December, the USAAF VIII Bomber Command, later renamed to Eighth Air Force, sent 574 heavy bombers against Münster and Osnabrück. A few aircraft from II. Gruppe were scrambled at 13:10 and vectored to a point of intercept north of Hengelo. At 14:03, Ruhl claimed an escorting P-47 fighter shot down near Nordhorn. Since this claim had no witness, the claim was unconfirmed. Three days later, II. Gruppe was withdrawn from combat operations and ordered to relocate to Rotenburg an der Wümme for a period of rest and replenishment. Here, Ruhl was awarded the German Cross in Gold (Deutsches Kreuz in Gold) on 5 February 1944. The Gruppe was also placed under command of Hauptmann Detlev Rohwer. Rohwer replaced Hauptmann Heinrich Sannemann who had temporarily led II. Gruppe after their two former commanders, Major Brändle and Hauptmann Wilhelm Lemke had been killed in action in late 1943.

Combat box of a 12-plane B-17 squadron. Three such boxes completed a 36-plane group box.: 1. Lead Element; 2. High Element; 3. Low Element; 4. Low Low Element

On 24 February 1944, the USAAF Eighth and Fifteenth Air Force attacked German aircraft manufacturing during Operation Argument, also known as "Big Week". II. Gruppe intercepted west of Gotha, making several passes through the combat box formations. During this encounter, II. Gruppe pilots claimed seven bombers shot and two Herausschüsse (separation shot) —a severely damaged heavy bomber forced to separate from its combat box which was counted as an aerial victory. That day, Ruhl was credited with an Herausschüsse over a Consolidated B-24 Liberator and another B-24 shot down.

When in April and then June 1944, Ruhl had fallen ill, the Staffel was first led by Oberfeldwebel Hans Grünberg and then by Hauptmann Herbert Kutscha before his return in July. Ruhl was hospitalized due to physical and mental exhaustion. The exact date of his departure is not known, he had flown six combat missions since the Normandy landings on 6 June. While recovering, Ruhl was awarded the Knight's Cross of the Iron Cross (Ritterkreuz des Eisernen Kreuzes) on 27 July 1944 for 34 aerial victories claimed. On 23 November, Ruhl led elements of 4. Staffel on an escort mission for a German naval convoy. The flight engaged RAF Beaufighters, claiming three Beaufighters shot down, including two by Ruhl. Towards the end of this encounter, RAF Supermarine Spitfire fighters appeared, pursuing the German fighters until they reached the coast near Den Helder. Ruhl's Bf 109 G-6 (Werknummer 20573—factory number) was hit, forcing him to bail out.

On 25 November, II. Gruppe was detached from JG 3. Effective immediately, the Gruppe was renamed and became the I. Gruppe of Jagdgeschwader 7 (JG 7—7th Fighter Wing) which was being equipped with the Messerschmitt Me 262 jet fighter. In consequence, Ruhl was transferred to I. Gruppe of JG 3 where he was given command of the recently newly formed 4. Staffel. The Staffel had been created in October under command of Oberleutnant Oskar Romm who was then transferred. Ruhl claimed his last two confirmed aerial victories on 12 December, taking his total to 37. That day, RAF Bomber Command No. 3 Group attacked the Ruhrstahl steel factory at Witten. In its defense, Ruhl claimed two of the attacking Avro Lancaster bombers shot down.

On 24 December 1944 during the aerial battles of the Battle of the Bulge, Ruhl went missing in action, later declared dead. His Bf 109 G-10 (Werknummer 490423) is believed to have crashed in the area of Bergisches Land. According to Dixon, Ruhl was shot down by US fighters near Liège, Belgium. In consequence, command of 4. Staffel was passed on to Oberfeldwebel Friedrich Hameister. Posthumously, Ruhl was promoted to Oberleutnant (first lieutenant).

== Summary of career ==
=== Aerial victory claims ===
According to Obermaier, Ruhl was credited with 36 aerial victories claimed in over 200 combat missions. Mathews and Foreman, authors of Luftwaffe Aces — Biographies and Victory Claims, researched the German Federal Archives and found records for 35 aerial victory claims, plus eight further unconfirmed claims. This figure includes 19 aerial victories on the Eastern Front and 16 over the Western Allies, including 13 four-engined bombers.

Victory claims were logged to a map-reference (PQ = Planquadrat), for example "PQ 35 Ost 70872". The Luftwaffe grid map (Jägermeldenetz) covered all of Europe, western Russia and North Africa and was composed of rectangles measuring 15 minutes of latitude by 30 minutes of longitude, an area of about 360 square miles (930 km^{2}). These sectors were then subdivided into 36 smaller units to give a location area 3 km × 4 km (1.9 mi × 2.5 mi) in size.

Chronicle of aerial victories
This and the – (dash) indicates unconfirmed aerial victory claims for which Ruhl did not receive credit. This along with the * (asterisk) indicates an Herausschuss (separation shot)—a severely damaged heavy bomber forced to separate from his combat box which was counted as an aerial victory. This and the ? (question mark) indicates information discrepancies listed by Prien, Stemmer, Rodeike, Bock, Mathews and Foreman.
Claim	Date	Time	Type	Location	Claim	Date	Time	Type	Location
– 4. Staffel (II. Gruppe) of Jagdgeschwader 3 "Udet" – Eastern Front — March – April 1943
1	10 March 1943	15:25	Il-2	PQ 35 Ost 70872, southwest of Nowossjolowka; 25 km (16 mi) north-northeast of Krasnyi Lyman	6	29 April 1943	05:42	LaGG-3	PQ 34 Ost 85114, vicinity of Mertschanskaja
2? (Note: According to Mathews and Foreman this claim is unconfirmed.)	11 April 1943	12:35? (Note: According to Mathews and Foreman claimed at 12:39.)	P-39	east of Mingrelskaja	7	29 April 1943	05:45	LaGG-3	PQ 34 Ost 75233, west of Krymskaja vicinity of Krymsk
3	12 April 1943	10:27? (Note: According to 2003 book by Prien and Stemmer claimed at 10:35.)	P-39	PQ 34 Ost 86384, 6 km (3.7 mi) north of Marjanskaja vicinity of Nowomyschastowskaja	8	29 April 1943	07:58	LaGG-3	PQ 34 Ost 75232, northwest of Krymskaja vicinity of Krymsk
4	20 April 1943	16:10	La-5	PQ 34 Ost 75451, 5 km (3.1 mi) southwest of Novorossiysk; Black Sea, 15 km (9.3 mi) southwest of Kabardinka	9	29 April 1943	08:12	LaGG-3	PQ 34 75251, 18 km (11 mi) northeast of Krymskaja vicinity of Sswobodnyj
5	28 April 1943	16:20	LaGG-3	PQ 34 Ost 85131, 2 km (1.2 mi) north of Abinskaja; Abinsk-Achtyrskaja					
– Stab II. Gruppe of Jagdgeschwader 3 "Udet" – Eastern Front — May – June 1943
10	8 May 1943	12:15	Spitfire	PQ 34 Ost 75263, south of Krymskaja vicinity of Krymsk	14	8 June 1943	11:15	Yak-1	PQ 35 Ost 62213, Grjesnoje
11	8 May 1943	17:55	Spitfire	PQ 34 Ost 75263, Krymskaja vicinity of Krymsk	15	8 June 1943	11:20	La-5	PQ 35 Ost 61214, Grjesnoje
12	9 May 1943	16:45	Yak-1	PQ 34 Ost 85111, northeast of Krymskaja	16	21 June 1943	14:45	Yak-1	PQ 35 Ost 62543, south Ostrenkij
13	11 May 1943	06:30	Yak-1	PQ 34 Ost 85121, north of Abinskaja	17	23 June 1943	17:50	Yak-1	PQ 35 Ost 70322, east of Starowerowka
– 4. Staffel (II. Gruppe) of Jagdgeschwader 3 "Udet" – Eastern Front — July – 2 August 1943
18	28 July 1943	16:30	Yak-1	PQ 35 Ost 61244, Lutschky	20	31 July 1943	05:43	Yak-1	3 km (1.9 mi) north of Stepanovka
19	31 July 1943	05:37	La-5	PQ 34 Ost 88262, north of Kuibyschewo					
– 4. Staffel (II. Gruppe) of Jagdgeschwader 3 "Udet" – Defense of the Reich — 12 September – 31 December 1943
21	16 September 1943	19:02	Beaufighter	35 km (22 mi) west of Den Helder	26	23 November 1943	15:06	Beaufighter	west of Texel
22	24 September 1943	17:20	B-17	PQ 05 Ost S/EE-1; PQ FF-4 North Sea	27	23 November 1943	15:08	Beaufighter	west of Texel
23	27 September 1943	11:15	B-17	PQ 05 Ost S/CP-5; Manslagt northwest of Emden	—	1 December 1943	11:27	P-47	
24	8 October 1943	14:48? (Note: According to Mathews and Foreman claimed at 14:42. This is also the time listed in the 2003 book by Prien and Stemmer.)	B-17	PQ 05 Ost S/EN-1; Noordwolde-Steenwijk	—	11 December 1943	12:50	P-47	
25	8 October 1943	16:22? (Note: According to Mathews and Foreman claimed at 15:12. This is also the time listed in the 2003 book by Prien and Stemmer.)	B-17	35 km (22 mi) southwest of Groningen	—	22 December 1943	14:03	P-47	
– 4. Staffel (II. Gruppe) of Jagdgeschwader 3 "Udet" – Defense of the Reich — 1 January – 6 June 1944
28	10 February 1944	12:30	B-17	PQ 05 Ost S/FR-2, south of Vechta; Braunschweig/Minden	31? (Note: According to Mathews and Foreman this claim is unconfirmed.)	8 March 1944	13:50	B-17	Celle/Rathenow
—	21 February 1944	14:25? (Note: According to Mathews and Foreman claimed at 14:24. This is also the time listed in the 2003 book by Prien and Stemmer.)	B-17	Braunschweig/Minden	32	8 May 1944	10:05	B-17	Achim
—	24 February 1944	13:25? (Note: According to Mathews and Foreman claimed at 13:40.)	B-24*	Eschwege/Bad Neustadt	33	12 May 1944	12:40	B-17	PQ 05 Ost S/QR-PQ; Gießen/Frankfurt am Main
29	24 February 1944	13:45	B-24	northeast of Bad Hersfeld; Eschwege/Bad Neustadt	34	19 May 1944	13:50	B-17*	Rinow
30	8 March 1944	13:32	B-17	PQ 15 Ost S/HC; Celle/Rathenow	35	24 May 1944	11:15	B-17	PQ 15 Ost S/EH-5/8, Finow northwest of Eberswalde
– 4. Staffel (I. Gruppe) of Jagdgeschwader 3 "Udet" – Defense of the Reich — November – 24 December 1944
36	12 December 1944	13:59	Lancaster	PQ 05 Ost KP; Bottrop-Recklinghausen	— ? (Note: This unconfirmed claim is not listed in the 2018 book by Prien, Stemmer, and Bock. However, the claim is listed in 2002 book by Prien and Stemmer as an unconfirmed claim.)	24 December 1944	—	P-47	
37	12 December 1944	14:07	Lancaster	PQ 05 Ost LO; Ruhr Valley					

=== Awards ===
- Iron Cross (1939) 2nd and 1st Class
- Honor Goblet of the Luftwaffe (26 November 1943)
- German Cross in Gold on 5 February 1944 as Leutnant in the 4./Jagdgeschwader 3
- Knight's Cross of the Iron Cross on 27 July 1944 as Leutnant and Staffelführer of the 4./Jagdgeschwader 3 "Udet"
