= Friedrich Geisshardt =

German World War II flying ace

Friedrich Geißhardt
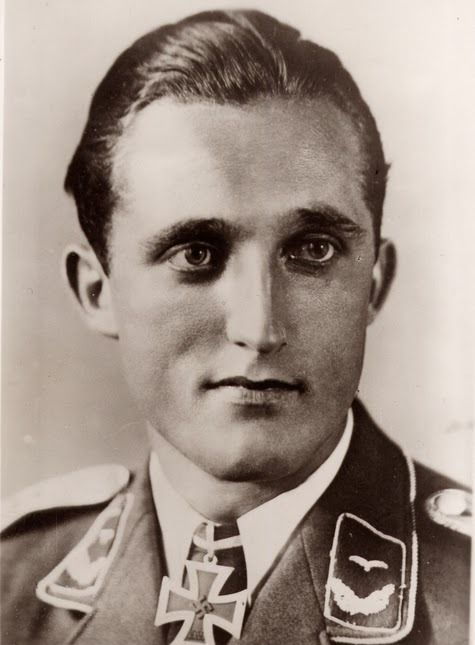
- Geißhardt as a Leutnant
- Born: 22 January 1919; Sonnefeld, Oberfranken
- Died: 6 April 1943 (aged 24); Sint-Denijs-Westrem, Ghent, German-occupied Belgium
- Burial place: Bourdon German war cemetery, France
- Military career
- Allegiance: Nazi Germany
- Branch: Luftwaffe
- Service years: 1937–1943
- Rank: Hauptmann (captain)
- Units: LG 2, JG 77, JG 26
- Commands: III./JG 26
- Conflicts: See battles World War II: Invasion of Poland; Battle of Britain; Balkans Campaign; Battle of Crete; Operation Barbarossa; Siege of Malta; North African Campaign; Defense of the Reich (DOW)
- Awards: Knight's Cross of the Iron Cross with Oak Leaves

Friedrich Geißhardt (Note: His name, in German, is spelled with a "sharp S"; see ß.) (22 January 1919 – 6 April 1943) was a German former Luftwaffe fighter ace and recipient of the Knight's Cross of the Iron Cross with Oak Leaves during World War II. A flying ace or fighter ace is a military aviator credited with shooting down five or more enemy aircraft during aerial combat. The Knight's Cross of the Iron Cross was the highest award in the armed forces of Germany during World War II.

Geißhardt is credited with 102 victories in 642 combat missions, including 37 close air support missions. He achieved 63 of his victories over the Eastern Front. In his total are at least seventeen Spitfires. Geißhardt was mortally wounded in combat with US bombers on 5 April 1943 and succumbed to his injuries the next day.

== Early life and career ==
Geißhardt was born on 22 January 1919 in Sonnefeld, near Coburg in Oberfranken. He was the son of a teacher who had died early from wounds sustained during World War I. Aged fifteen, he joined the Flying Hitler Youth (Flieger-HJ) and became a glider pilot. He joined the military service of the Luftwaffe in 1937 and was transferred to the 2. Staffel (2nd squadron) of Lehrgeschwader 2 (LG 2—2nd Squadron of the 2nd Demonstration Wing) on 1 July 1939. (Note: For an explanation of the meaning of Luftwaffe unit designation see Organization of the Luftwaffe during World War II.)

== World War II ==
In preparation for the German invasion of Poland on 1 September 1939, I.(Jagd)/LG 2 (1st Fighter Group of the 2nd Demonstration Wing) under command of Hauptmann Hanns Trübenbach had been ordered to airfields at Lottin (now Lotyń), where the Gruppenstab (headquarters unit), 2. and 3. Staffel where based, and to Malzkow (now Malczkowo) near Stolp (now Słupsk), where 1. Staffel had been sent. Following the German advance, I.(Jagd)/LG 2 relocated to Lauenburg (now Lębork), near Bromberg on 9 September in support the 4. Armee (4th Army). Unteroffizier (a non-commissioned officer) Geißhardt claimed his first aerial victory, a PZL P.24 fighter, that day. The aircraft shot down was misidentified and was a PZL P.11c fighter of Polish III/3 Squadron (132 escadrille) flown by podporucznik Witold Jaroszka who was killed in action near Lubień. The following day, flying a Messerschmitt Bf 109 E, Geißhardt had to make an emergency landing behind Polish lines near Włocławek following combat with Polish PZL P.11 fighter aircraft. (Note: According to Łydżba, Geißhardt landed behind Polish lines on 9 September following combat with Polish PZL P.11 fighter aircraft of III/3 Squadron.) After several hours in Polish captivity, he escaped during the confusion caused by a German Junkers Ju 87 dive bomber attack. He returned to German lines after walking and riding on a stolen horse for five days, arriving with his unit on 15 September. Following the Battle of the Bzura, the Luftwaffe ordered I.(Jagd)/LG 2 to move to Garz on the island of Rügen on 20 September. He was promoted to Leutnant der Reserve (second lieutenant of the military reserve forces) on 1 December 1939.

Geißhardt was transferred to the 1./LG 2 (1st Squadron of the 2nd Demonstration Wing) on 27 February 1940. By the end of 1940, he claimed six Royal Air Force (RAF) aircraft shot down during the Battle of Britain, followed by six more claims in early 1941. On 6 April 1941, Geißhardt shot down four Hawker Fury biplane fighter aircraft in the aerial battles against the Yugoslav Royal Air Force's 36th Fighter Group during the Balkans Campaign. During the German Invasion of Crete he claimed two Hawker Hurricanes. He was posted as an adjutant of the Stab to the I.(Jagd)/LG 2 at the end of April 1941.

=== Eastern Front ===
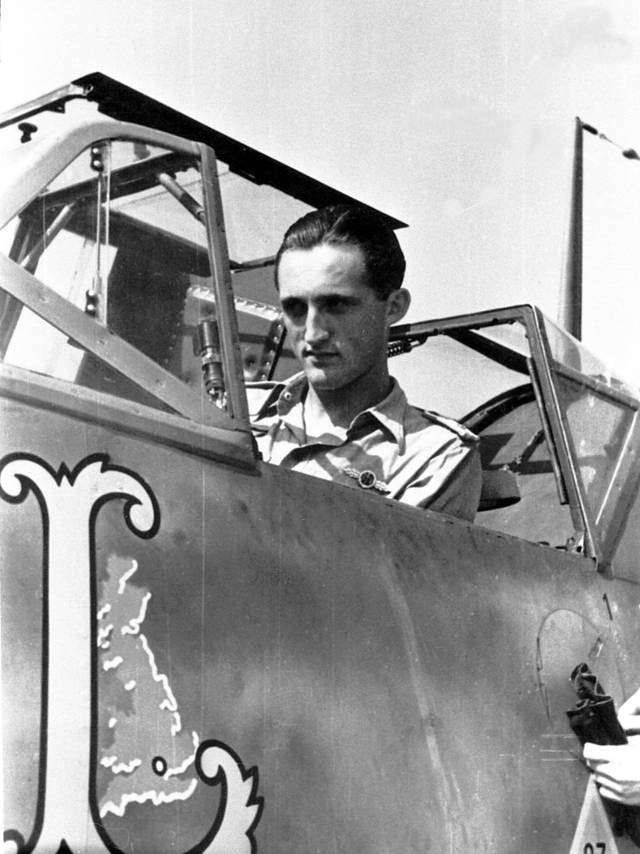
Geisshardt in a Bf 109 F-2/F-4

Following the Invasion of Crete, I.(Jagd)/LG 2 was again subordinated to Jagdgeschwader 77 (JG 77—77th Fighter Wing) on 18 June 1941 and was moved to Bucharest, Romania in preparation for Operation Barbarossa, the German invasion of the Soviet Union on 22 June 1941. JG 77 supported the German advance as part of Heeresgruppe Süd (Army Group South). On 21 June, the Gruppe was ordered to Roman, a forward airfield near the Siret river. Geißhardt claimed his first aerial victory on the Eastern Front, his twentieth overall, over a Tupolev SB-2 bomber at 05:52 on 23 June 1941.

He received the Knight's Cross of the Iron Cross (Ritterkreuz des Eisernen Kreuzes) on 30 August 1941, after 27 aerial victories. He shot down further enemy aircraft in quick succession in the early part of 1942. On 3 and 4 February 1942, Geißhardt and Oberleutnant Erwin Clausen shot down three Polikarpov R-5s or Polikarpov R-Zs of 622 LBAP (Legkii Bombardirovochnyy Aviatsionyy Polk—Light Bomber Aviation Regiment) and 672 LBAP. He claimed his 40th victory on 1 March 1942 over a Yakovlev fighter aircraft in the vicinity of Sloviansk. On 19 April 1942, Geißhardt took his total to 51 aerial victories when he shot down three Mikoyan-Gurevich MiG-3, also referred to by the Germans as I-61. The next day, he became an "ace-in-a-day" when he shot down five further I-61s, earning him his second named reference in the Wehrmachtbericht propaganda bulletin.

On 25 April 1942, Geißhardt became an "ace-in-a-day" for the second time which earned him his third and final named reference in the Wehrmachtbericht radio report. On three separate combat missions in the area of Sloviansk, he was credited with seven aerial victories, three I-61s, three Lavochkin-Gorbunov-Gudkov LaGG-1 and one biplane of unknown type. Geißhardt, who had been promoted to Oberleutnant (first lieutenant) on 1 April 1942, was appointed Staffelkapitän of the 3./JG 77 (3rd Squadron of the 77th Fighter Wing) on 26 April 1942.

Geißhardt was awarded the Knight's Cross of the Iron Cross with Oak Leaves (Ritterkreuz des Eisernen Kreuzes mit Eichenlaub) on 23 June 1942 for 79 aerial victories. The award was presented at the Führerhauptquartier at Rastenburg on 28/29 June 1942. By this date, he had claimed three more victories for an accumulated number of 82 victories. Two other Luftwaffe officers were presented with the Oak Leaves that day by Hitler, the night-fighter pilot Hauptmann (captain) Helmut Lent and fellow JG 77 pilot Oberleutnant Heinrich Setz.

=== Malta and North Africa ===
Shortly after the Oak Leaves presentation, I. Gruppe under the command of Hauptmann Heinrich Bär was ordered from the Eastern Front to the Mediterranean theatre of operations. On 29 June, I. Gruppe moved from Baherove, via Odessa, Băneasa, Sofia, Thessaloniki to Eleusis, where they arrived on 1 July. The unit was then ordered to Sicily where it arrived at the Comiso airfield on 5 July 1942 and was subordinated to the command of Jagdgeschwader 53 Pik-As (JG 53—53rd Fighter Wing). By the end of October 1942, Geißhardt was credited with destruction of nine enemy aircraft in the aerial battles of Malta, all of them Spitfire fighter aircraft. On 11 July 1942, he claimed two Spitfires shot down, one of which was not confirmed. He was credited with another Spitfire shot down in combat over Luqa on 20 July. On a combat air patrol flown from 09:30 to 10:35 on 29 July, Geißhardt again claimed yet again a Spitfire shot down over Malta. Geißhardt's Gruppe was then reequipped with the Bf 109 G-2, conversion completed on 1 September. Geißhardt claimed one more Spitfire on 8 September 1942, I. Gruppe's 700th aerial victory on 10 October, and his 89th on 10 October. He claimed his last two victories over Malta on 15 October. His first opponent may have been the Spitfire of No. 249 Squadron RAF flown by F/Sgt N.G. Bryden, who was wounded and bailed out into the sea. The second claim could have been the Spitfire of No. 249 Squadron RAF flown by P/O V.K. Moody, who crash-landed at Takali, Malta. Geißhardt was promoted to Hauptmann on 24 October 1942.

I. Gruppe began transferring to the North African theatre on 26 October 1942. That day, Geißhardt and five other pilots from 3. Staffel flew to Tripoli, Libya. There, he added nine more victories, among them his century on 10 November 1942. He was the 30th Luftwaffe pilot to achieve the century mark.

=== Western Front and death ===
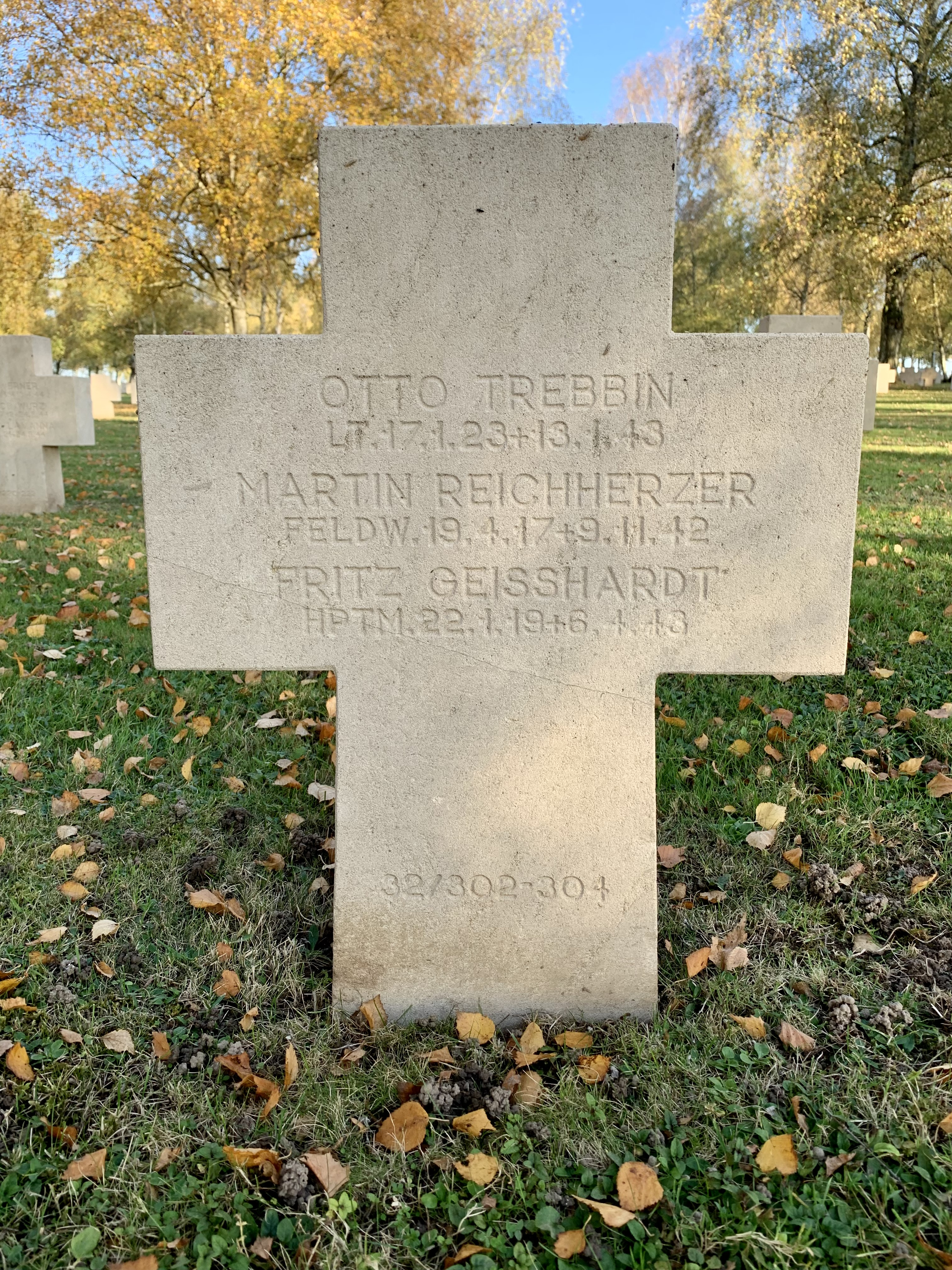
His grave at the Bourdon German war cemetery.

Geißhardt arrived at Wevelgem on 11 January 1943 to take over command as Gruppenkommandeur (group commander) of the III. Gruppe (3rd group) of Jagdgeschwader 26 "Schlageter" (JG 26—26th Fighter Wing) from Major Josef Priller. Geißhardt's arrogance grated on some of the pilots, who felt that he treated his fellow pilots who had not yet earned the Knight's Cross with too much disdain.

Geißhardt, who was flying Fw 190 A-4 (Werknummer 7051—factory number) in Priller's Schwarm, was severely wounded in combat with United States Army Air Forces (USAAF) B-17 Flying Fortresses of the 306th Bomb Group flying a mission to the Erla aircraft factory at Antwerp on 5 April 1943. He had been hit by the defensive fire from the bombers. He was bleeding profusely from a wound in the abdomen but managed to make a smooth landing on the airfield at Sint-Denijs-Westrem, Belgium. He succumbed to his injuries early the next morning on 6 April 1943.

== Summary of career ==
=== Aerial victory claims ===
According to US historian David T. Zabecki, Geißhardt was credited with 104 aerial victories. Spick lists Geißhardt with 102 enemy aircraft shot down in 642 combat missions, of which one was claimed during the invasion of Poland, 14 during the Battle of France and Britain, 75 over the Eastern Front, nine in the Mediterranean theater and three over North Africa. Mathews and Foreman, authors of Luftwaffe Aces – Biographies and Victory Claims, researched the German Federal Archives and found records for 93 aerial victory claims, plus eight further unconfirmed claims. This figure includes 60 aerial victories on the Eastern Front and 33 over the Western Allies.

=== Awards ===
- Iron Cross (1939)
  - 2nd Class (17 September 1939)
  - 1st Class (10 July 1940)
- Front Flying Clasp of the Luftwaffe for fighter pilots
- Honour Goblet of the Luftwaffe (Ehrenpokal der Luftwaffe) on 13 July 1941
- Bild des Reichsmarschalls im Silberrahmen
- German Cross in Gold on 24 April 1942 as Leutnant in the I./Jagdgeschwader 77
- Knight's Cross of the Iron Cross with Oak Leaves
  - Knight's Cross on 30 August 1941 as Leutnant (war officer) and pilot in the I./Jagdgeschwader 77 (Note: According to Scherzer as pilot and adjutant in the Stab I.(Jagd)/Lehrgeschwader 2.)
  - 101st Oak Leaves on 23 June 1942 as Oberleutnant (war officer), pilot and adjutant in the Stab I./Jagdgeschwader 77 (Note: According to Scherzer as Staffelkapitän of the 3./Jagdgeschwader 77.)
- Three named references in the Wehrmachtbericht (29 June 1941, 21 April 1942 and 14 May 1942)
