= Horst Tietzen =

German Spanish Civil War and World War II flying ace

- Born: 19 July 1912; Arnswalde, Province of Brandenburg, Prussia, German Empire (today Poland)
- Died: 18 August 1940 (aged 28) over the Thames Estuary, England
- Burial place: Bourdon German war cemetery (Cimetière militaire allemand de Bourdon)
- Military career
- Allegiance: Nazi Germany
- Branch: Luftwaffe
- Service years: ?–1940
- Rank: Hauptmann (Posthumously)
- Units: Condor Legion; JG 51
- Conflicts: See battles: Spanish Civil War; World War II Battle of France Battle of Britain †
- Awards: Spanish Cross In Gold with Swords; Knight's Cross of the Iron Cross

Horst Tietzen (19 July 1912 – 18 August 1940) was a German Luftwaffe fighter pilot and recipient of the Knight's Cross of the Iron Cross during World War II.

== Career ==
Tietzen was born 19 July 1912 at Arnswalde (today Choszczno in Poland). As a Leutnant, Tietzen served with 3. Staffel of Jagdgruppe 88 of the Condor Legion during the Spanish Civil War. He claimed his first air victory on 19 July 1938, downing a Republican I-16. On 1 August, Tietzen made a forced landing 12 kilometers (7.5 miles) northeast of Gandesa. He claimed a further six victories and was awarded the Spanienkreuz in Gold. On 1 November 1939, Tietzen was appointed Staffelkapitän (squadron leader) of the newly created 5. Staffel (5th squadron) of Jagdgeschwader 51 (JG 51—51st Fighter Wing). The Staffel had been created in August 1939 as the Reservestaffel (reserve squadron) of Jagdgeschwader 71 (JG 71—71st Fighter Wing).

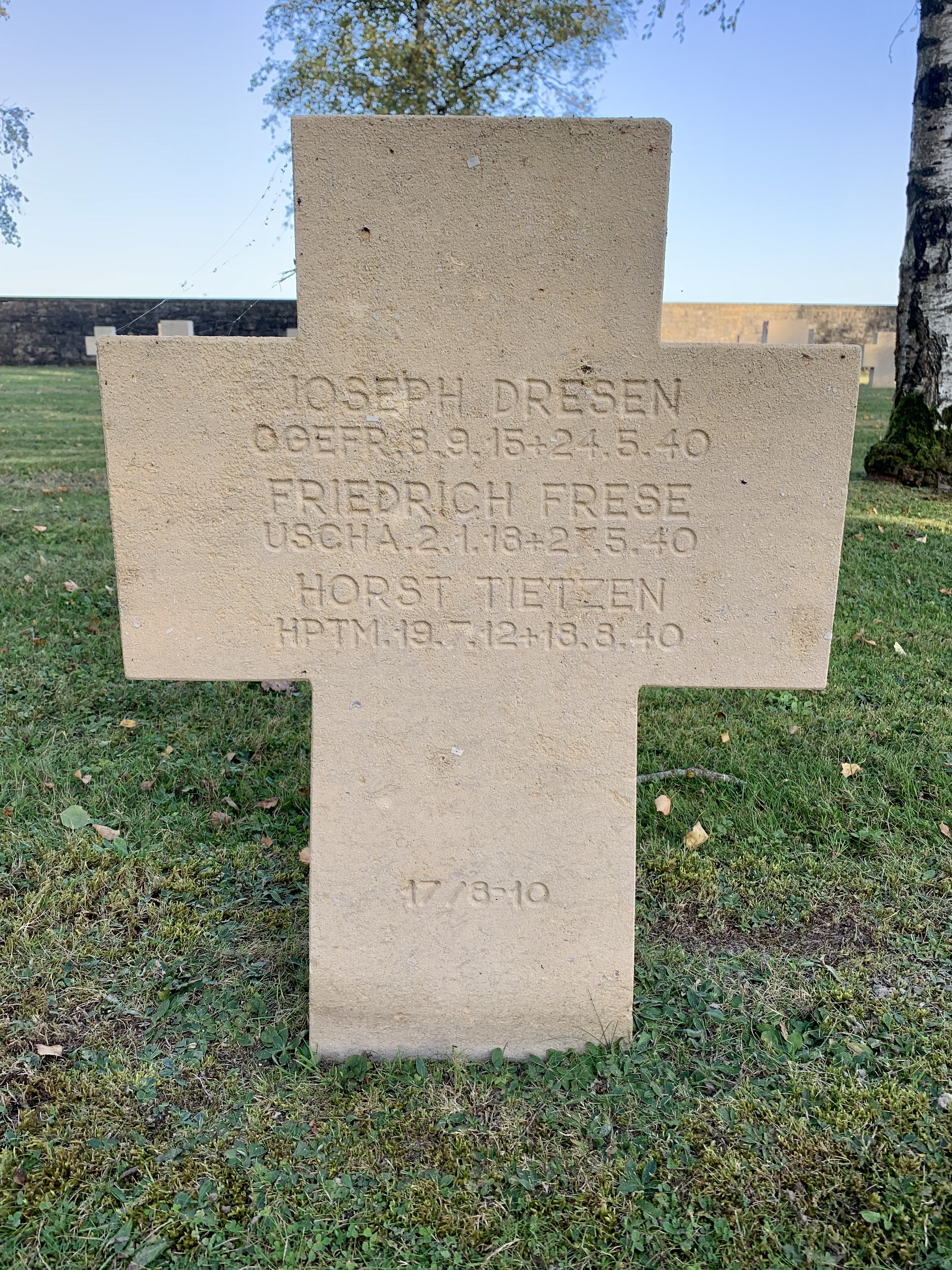
His grave at the Bourdon German war cemetery.

He shot down a French Bloch MB.174 bomber for his first victory of World War II on 20 April 1940. He recorded his 17th victory on 25 July 1940, a Spitfire near Dover. On 15 August Tietzen shot down three Hurricanes. He became the fourth German fighter pilot to record 20 victories on 18 August. However, on the same day, he was shot down in aerial combat with Royal Air Force Hurricane fighters over the Thames Estuary. His victors were Flying Officer Stefan Witorzenc and Pilot Officer Pawel Zenker from No. 501 Squadron who reported two Messerschmitt Bf 109 fighters shot down between Canterbury and Westgate-on-Sea which crashed near the North Goodwin Lightship. His body later washed ashore at Calais in France. Tietzen now rests at the Bourdon German war cemetery. He was posthumously awarded the Knight's Cross of the Iron Cross (Ritterkreuz des Eisernen Kreuzes) on 20 August 1940. He was the second recipient of JG 51, after Hauptmann Walter Oesau, to receive this award.

== Summary of career ==
=== Aerial victory claims ===
According to Obermaier, Tietzen was credited with 27 aerial victories, seven in the Spanish Civil War and 20 on the Western Front of World War II. Mathews and Foreman, authors of Luftwaffe Aces — Biographies and Victory Claims, researched the German Federal Archives and found documentation for 24 aerial victory claims, plus further three unconfirmed claims. This number of confirmed claims includes seven claims during the Spanish Civil War and 17 over the Western Allies.

Chronicle of aerial victories
This and the ? (question mark) indicates information discrepancies listed by Prien, Stemmer, Rodeike, Bock, Mathews and Foreman.
Claim	Date	Time	Type	Location	Claim	Date	Time	Type	Location
– 3. Staffel of Jagdgruppe 88 – Spanish Civil War
1	19 July 1938	—	I-16						
– 1. Staffel of Jagdgruppe 88 – Spanish Civil War
2	20 September 1938	—	I-16		5	27 September 1938	—	I-16	
3	20 September 1938	—	I-16		6	21 December 1938	—	I-16	
4	27 September 1938	—	I-16		7	29 December 1938	—	I-16	
World War II
– 5. Staffel of Jagdgeschwader 51 – "Phoney War" — 1 November 1939 – 9 May 1940
1	20 April 1940	11:50	Potez 63	north of Saarburg					
– 5. Staffel of Jagdgeschwader 51 – Battle of France — 10 May – 25 June 1940
2	14 June 1940	20:15	Battle	Évreux					
– 5. Staffel of Jagdgeschwader 51 – At the Channel and over England — 26 June – 18 August 1940
3	27 June 1940	20:10	Blenheim	south of Dover	12	31 July 1940	16:55	Spitfire	Dover
4	4 July 1940	14:45	Hurricane	northeast of Dover	13	11 August 1940	14:48	Hurricane	east of Colchester
5	9 July 1940	17:00	Spitfire	northeast of Margate	14	11 August 1940	14:50	Hurricane	Thames Estuary
6	13 July 1940	19:30	Hurricane	southeast of Dover	15	15 August 1940	12:40	Hurricane	Folkestone
7	14 July 1940	16:10	Hurricane	southeast of Dover	16	15 August 1940	12:41	Hurricane	Folkestone
8	18 July 1940	10:55	Spitfire	15 km (9.3 mi) north of Calais	17? (Note: According to Mathews and Foreman this claim was unconfirmed.)	15 August 1940	—	Hurricane	south of Harwich
9	20 July 1940	19:15	Hurricane	southeast of Dover	18	16 August 1940	13:25	Hurricane	east of Canterbury
10	25 July 1940	17:10	Spitfire	Dover	19?	16 August 1940	—	Spitfire	southwest of Ramsgate
11	29 July 1940	08:35	Spitfire	5 km (3.1 mi) north of Dover	20?	18 August 1940	—	Hurricane	

=== Awards ===
- Spanish Cross in Gold with Swords (14 April 1939)
- Iron Cross (1939) 2nd and 1st Class
- Knight's Cross of the Iron Cross on 20 August 1940 as Hauptmann and Staffelkapitän of 5./Jagdgeschwader 51
