= Ściechów =

- Village
- Location within Poland
- Coordinates: 52°49′N 14°58′E
- Country: Poland
- Voivodeship: Lubusz
- County: Gorzów
- Gmina: Lubiszyn

Ściechów [ˈɕt͡ɕɛxuf] is a village in the administrative district of Gmina Lubiszyn, within Gorzów County, Lubusz Voivodeship, in western Poland.

== Notable residents ==
- Hans Grünberg (1917-1998), German Luftwaffe pilot
