= Luftwaffe radio equipment of World War II =

Luftwaffe usage of radio equipment during World War II

During World War II, the German Luftwaffe relied on an increasingly diverse array of electronic communications, IFF and RDF equipment as avionics in its aircraft and also on the ground. Most of this equipment received the generic prefix FuG for Funkgerät, meaning "radio equipment". Most of the aircraft-mounted Radar equipment also used the FuG prefix. This article is a list and a description of the radio, IFF and RDF equipment.

== Airborne communications ==
FuG I: An early receiver/transmitter set manufactured by Lorenz. It operated in the 600 to 1667 kHz range (generally the entire American AM radio broadcast band) at a power of 20 to 100 watts, depending on installation.

FuG II: An update of the FuG 1, also manufactured by Lorenz, that operated in the 310 to 600 kHz frequency range, the lower end of the MF band.

FuG 03: Codenamed Stuttgart, was an airborne receiver/transmitter set used in bombers. Was fitted in: Do 11, Do 17 E and F, Fw 58, He 114, Ju 52, Ar 66, Ar 96, Junkers W 33 and W 34. Set consists of: S 3a Transmitter; E 2a Receiver. Power source: G 3 Air-driven generator and 2 - 90 volt dry cells. The FuG 03 operated in the 1250 to 1400 kHz frequency range.

FuG 7: A compact airborne receiver/transmitter used in fighters and dive bombers. Prior to 1943, it was fitted in the Bf 109C to G-2, and Fw 190 A-0 to A-3. After 1943, it was still fitted in the Ju 87 and Hs 129. The FuG 7 typically operated in the 2.5 to 7.5 MHz, with a power of approximately 7 watts. The range of the FuG 7 was approximately 50 km in good weather. Later versions of the FuG 7 included the FuG 7a, which included the S 6a Transmitter, E 5a Receiver and Junction Box VK 5 A.

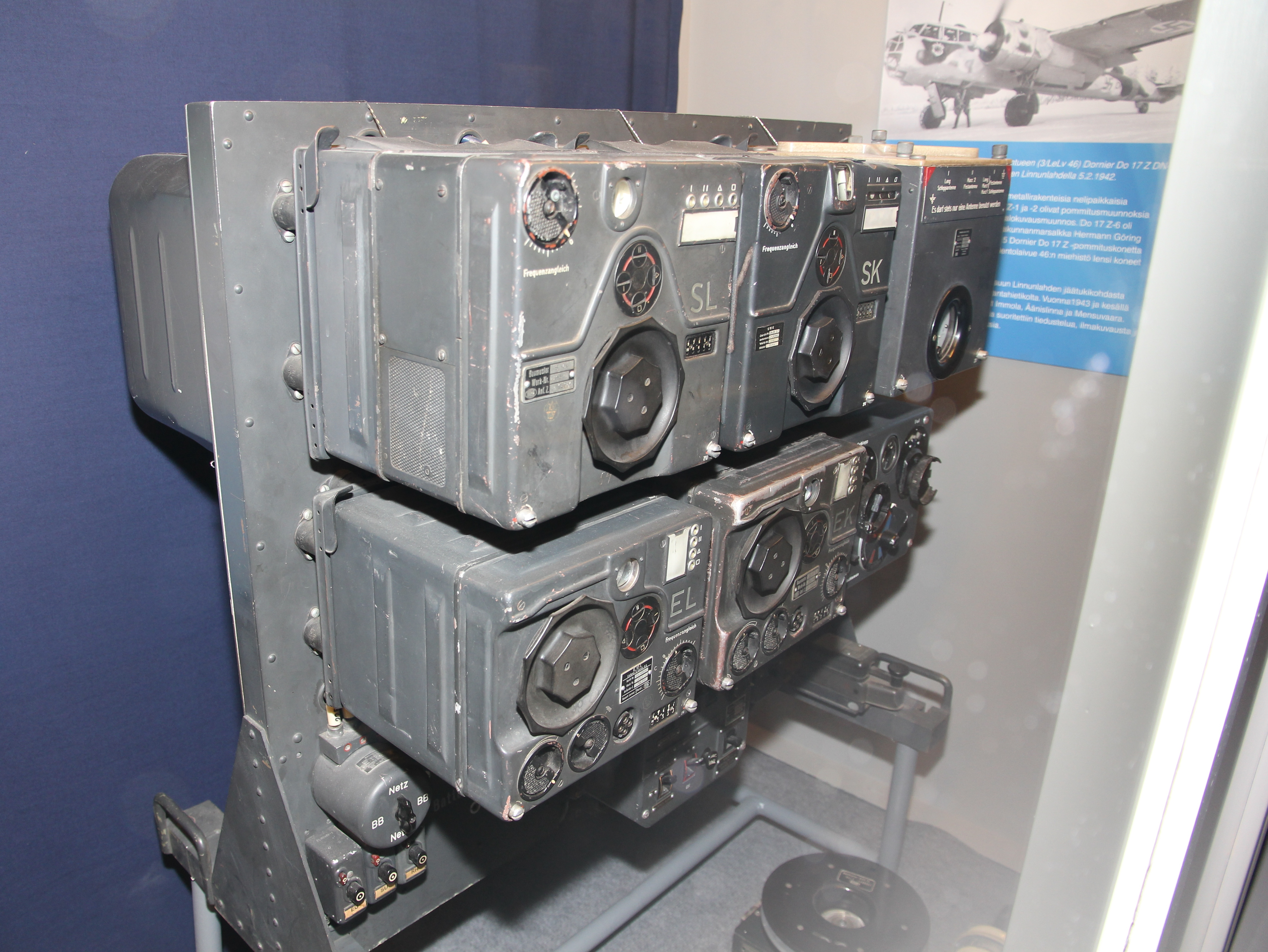
FuG 10 radio panel from a Dornier Do 17

FuG 10 series: A family of transceivers for both R/T and W/T communications. The German FuG 10 panel, or rack, contained two transmitters and two receivers: One transmitter and its companion receiver operated in the MF or Longwave; 300 to 600 kHz (1,000 to 500 m) range and the other transmitter and its companion receiver operated in the HF or Shortwave range; 3 to 6 MHz (100 to 50 m). Most of the FuG 10 series used a fixed wire aerial between the fuselage and tailfin or a retractable trailing aerial wire. The FuG 10P replaced the standard E 10L longwave receiver with an EZ6 unit for a G6 direction finding set. The FuG 10ZY incorporated a fixed loop D/F aerial and a homing device for navigation to a ground station. This loop aerial, usually fitted on a small, "teardrop" shaped mounting, was standard equipment on most fighter aircraft from late 1943 on. Manufactured by Lorenz. Typical power was 70 watts.

FuG 11: Developed as a replacement for the FuG 10 series. No MF mode, and of up to 3 kW output. Increased HF-only transceiving range to 3 - 30 MHz (the entire HF band). CW & AM voice. Reduced volume, cost & weight. Intended to be combined with the PeilG 6 & FuBL 2. It could be fitted with a remote control system that allowed the pilot to control it rather than the radio operator. Development completed but never deployed as there was little demand for long range bomber communications in 1944.

FuG 13: Designed to supplement early versions of the FuG 10 to improve long range communications. Frequency range 3 MHz to 20 MHz 20 Watts output power. Deployed on long range aircraft such as the Fw 200 Condor. Improvements in the FuG 10 family resulted in no need for this additional radio and it was withdrawn from service.

FuG 15: Intended as the next standard aircraft transceiver to replace earlier series units. Unusual in using FM as well as AM for voice. Operating Frequency 37.8 to 47.7 MHz. It could be fitted with a remote control system that allowed the pilot to control it rather than the radio operator. Production planned to start in 1942 but service trials showed problems and deployment stopped. Replaced by the FuG 16. Completed units rebuilt as BS 15 navigation radio beacons in 1945.

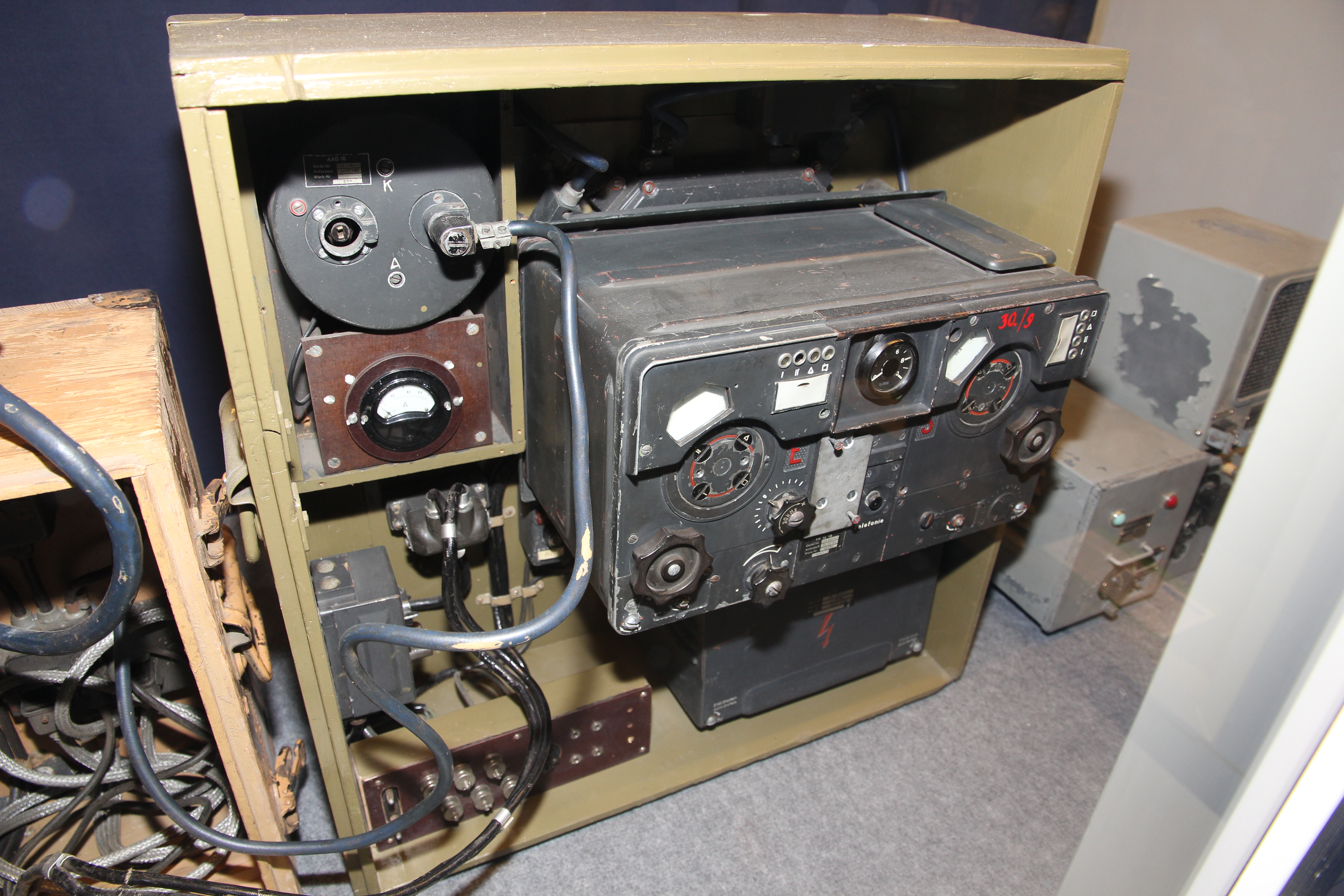
FuG 16 Z radio

FuG 16 Z, ZE and ZY: These sets were airborne VHF transceivers used in single-seat fighter aircraft for R/T and W/T communications, and were also used for ground fixes and DF homing on ground stations when used in conjunction with the FuG 10P or FuG 10ZY. Installed for Bf 109G-3/G-4 and later, Fw 190A-4 and later subtypes. Frequency Range was 38.5 to 42.3 MHz. The FuG 16ZY was also used for Y-Verfahren (Y-Control), in which aircraft were fitted up as Leitjäger or Fighter Formation Leaders that could be tracked and directed from the ground via special R/T equipment. Aircraft equipped with ZY were fitted with a Morane whip aerial array. Principal components: Transmitter, Receiver, Modulator in one case, S 16 Z Tx, E 16 Z Rcvr, NG 16 Z Modulator Dynamotor U 17 Antenna Matching unit AAG 16 Z Modulator Unit MZ 16 Homing Unit ZVG 16 Indicator AFN - 2

FuG 17 Z and ZY: These sets were airborne VHF transceivers used in Close Air Support aircraft for R/T and W/T communications with ground units. Frequency Range was 42 to 48.3 MHz. This matched the ground forces FuG 7 radio fitted to command tanks and reconnaissance units. The FuG 17 was identical to the FuG 16 with the exception of the frequency range and seems to have been deployed first. In the FuG 17ZY version it was also used for Y-Verfahren (Y-Control), though it seems to have superseded it this role by the FuG 16ZY when it became available.

FuG 18: Developed in 1944 as an improvement to the FuG 15. Frequency range 24 - 75 MHz. FM & AM voice. FuG 18Y included the ability for Y-control, blind landing and Hermine beacon receive.

FuG 24: This set was developed from the FuG 16 as a simplified and cost reduced system. Intended for the Heinkel He 162 and later aircraft. Did not have a direction finder capability or a Y control interface. Frequency Range was 42 to 48.3 MHz, FM & AM voice only. FuG 24Z included Y-Control and blind landing and Hermine beacon-receiving capability.

FuG 29: Development unit designed to work as receiver for the running commentary,- "Laufende Reportage" - that was transmitted from radio navigation stations to aid the day- and night- fighters participating in the defense of the Reich. Due to the high transmitting power of the transmitters, the signal was almost immune to interference from jamming. It was an AM receiver, with a frequency range of between 150 kHz and 6 MHz, with 6 push buttons preselected frequencies but details lacking and development was never completed.

== Navigation and direction finding ==
Peilgerät (PeilG) 6: Codenamed "Alex Sniatkowski", this was a long and medium range D/F set and homing device used mainly on bombers: Ar 234, Do 217, Ju 87, Ju 88A-4 on, Ju 188, Ju 290, Ju 388; the He 177A heavy bombers (Germany's only "heavy bomber" design in service), and both the He 219A and Ju 88G night fighter series are some of the aircraft types to be fitted. Frequency range was 150 to 1,200 kHz. A "flat" equivalent of a D/F loop was used for the Peilgerät device to reduce drag over a protruding D/F loop antenna, and made up of a series of metal strips in a "sunburst" pattern. often being fitted under a round, flush fitting plexiglass cover. A small "whip" aerial was also fitted to the FuG 10 radiomast. Manufactured by Telefunken. Version PeilG 5 was of similar performance but used a manually controlled loop antenna. Control was via an electric servo motor. Versions 1 - 4 had manual control either via cable linkage or direct control via an attached handle.

FuBL 2: Used the Knickebein beam navigation and bombing system. Consisted of the EBL 3 and EBL 2 receivers with display device ANF 2. The EBL 3 operated between 30 and 33 MHz and received 34 channels, The EBL 2 operated at 38 MHz and was unchanged from the FuBL 1 system. The AFN 2 provided the pilot with a left/right display and a signal strength. The unit was available in two versions FuBL 2 H for a unit operated by the radio operator and the FuBL 2 F for remote operation by the pilot in a single seat aircraft.`The primary difference between the EBL 1 and the EBL 3 was sensitivity to allow, what was basically a ILS system, to be used for bombing.

FuG 28a: Y-Gerät transponder. Based on the Fug17 transceiver with additional components to send the response to the Y-Gerät ground station for the ground station to derive range. Also derived the azimuth signal and displayed the results on the ANF 2 display giving the pilot a left/right command. Operating frequency 24 - 28 MHz. 8 Watts transmit power. The unit also interfaced to the FuG 10 system in the aircraft so that voice communication with the pilot from the ground controllers via the Fug 28a was possible.

Hermine: This system was a VHF radio beacon. Originally developed in 1942 due to problems the design was suspended. When in 1944 the existing radio navigation systems were either being jammed or under physical attack the design was revisited. It consisted of a rotating radio beacon transmitting at 30 -33 MHz. The signal consisted of a tone and a robot voice using FM. The robot voice was encoded onto an optical disk. The voice spoke a number between 1 and 35, corresponding to 10 degrees of angle from the beacon. The pilot listened to the signal, when the tone disappeared the next number corresponded to the angle from the beacon. It was expected that this would give an angular resolution of about 5 degrees but when tested it was found that some pilots could estimate to within 3 degrees. The receiver was a modified EBL 3 which had had its bandwidth increased and fitted with an FM interface board. This board also connected to the pilots audio via the Fug16 to send the audio information to the pilot. In single-seater aircraft the radio fit was numbered FuG 125. The beacon identifier was transmitted instead of the number 0. This allowed a pilot to select a particular beacon. Between 10 -20 beacons were commissioned by May 1945. 30 channels were available with 2 more being reserved for airfield ILS. Beacons were usually placed 20 km from a runway, The pilot would over fly the beacon and then circle until he acquired the ILS landing beam on the FuBL 2 equipment. Ground units were BS 15 navigation radio beacons constructed from rebuilt FuG 15 sets.

FuG120/FuG120k Bernhard: The "Bernhard/Bernhardine" system was a nightfighter/day fighter radio-navigation system. Primary intended to guide fighters into the bomber streams rather than against individual aircraft. The ground station (FuSAn 724/725) "Bernhard" was the VHF rotating directional-beacon ground-station. It continuously transmitted the station identifier and the antenna azimuth (bearing) in Hellschreiber-format. The FuG 120 "Bernhardine" was the airborne Hellschreiber system that prints the data stream from the selected Bernhard station. The HF receiver for the system was the EBL3 from the FuBL 2 ILS system. Operating Frequency: 30 - 33.1 MHz, Transmitter power: 2 × 500 Watt (FuSAn 724) or 2 x 5000 Watt (FuSAn 725). Antenna rotational speed: 12 degrees per second (2 revolutions per minute). Accuracy: initially ±1°, then improved to ±0.5°. The system was initially deployed in 1941/42 however work was stopped until 1944. Deployment was started to try and produce a "jam proof" system. A later version (deployed at about 3 sites) alternated between sending angular information and text message instructions which allowed a simple form of data link between the fighter direction stations and the fighters. FuG 120k: This version was developed as the original unit was bulky and expensive. In return for considerable reduction is size and weight azimuth measurement was reduced to approx. 4 degrees.

Fug 126: By 1944 the Germans were aware of the operating concept of the British Rebecca/Eureka system and the Oboe and G-H systems via captured examples. From this they developed the Baldur system. This was a system or responder beacons working at 2-4 Meters wavelength. The airborne equipment FuG 126 was based on the SN2 radar. Accuracy was +- 100 meters. The system seems to have only deployed in small numbers as bomber operations were ceasing due to the air forces concentration just on fighters and CAS. A variant called FuG162k was produced for single seat fighter (reduced accuracy +- 500 meters) operation but it seems never to have been used.

Two variants of the system were also designed Baldur-Truhe, combined system and Baldur- Bernhardine again a combination. Neither of these systems seem to have achieved flight trials.

== Radio beam navigation systems ==
The Luftwaffe operationally deployed 3 beam navigation systems during the first part of the war. Knickebein, X-Gerät and Y-Gerät. For more information see the main page Battle of the Beams

Knickebein: Development started on this system in 1934 based on work done by Lorenz. The initial work was to develop their ILS system but further work investigated how far a beam of this frequency could be used to guide an aircraft. It was found that by using a combination of a large antenna, a powerful transmitter and maximum elevation of the antenna that ranges far in excess of those expected could be achieved. (probably being caused by ducting, a little understood propagation mode at the time). With an antenna at 1000m above sea level and an aircraft flying at 3000m ranges of 400 km could be achieved. Aircraft equipment was the EBL3 receiver. Frequency range 30 - 34 MHz.

X-Gerät: The Knickebein system was even for its time very crude. As soon as it had proved itself development of an improved system called X-Gerät was started. This used higher frequencies 66-70 MHz to improve resolution and reduce the size of the antenna group. This allowed the system to be mobile (by standards of 1940s not today's standards for mobile). Additionally it used 4 beams rather than two, included was a system called the X-clock. This allowed much better accuracy, crews often achieved 300 x 300 meter target boxes.

Y-Gerät: This system was developed to allow one beam rather than the 2 or 4 of the other systems. The airborne component was the FuG 28, which was an FuG 17E with additional transponder systems. Essentially the system transmitted on one beam that indicated left/right on a pilot display and a range indication by using the FuG 28 transponder. System transmitted at the FuG 17 range of 42.1 to 47.7 MHz.

Y-Control for fighters: Developed from mid 1943 to guide fighters to intercept bomber streams. Radio equipment was a modified FuG 16 equipment.

== Long range radio navigation systems ==
FuG 124 Komet: In 1942 with the He 177 and the "Battle of the Atlantic" in full swing the Germans started the development of a long range beacon system called Komet. This was based on pre-war work done by Lorenz. Its consisted or a rapidly rotating beam (electronic not mechanical) transmitting at 3 kW and at frequencies between 5 and 12 MHz. The signals were picked up using a FuG10K receiver and processed by the FuG 124 Komet processor which printed the results out on a paper strip.(The Kometscriber). Two test stations were built in 1944. There were several problems which resulted in it never being used. The antenna array was vast using 127 aerials and 19 control huts. It was discovered that it would be easy to jam and as it was now 1944 with German forces falling back on all fronts there was no longer a requirement for it. The few Fug124 receivers built were only used on the ground for R&D work.

FuG 121 Erika: First deployed in 1942 it was used briefly before being replaced by Sonne and Bernard. Erika transmitted a VHF signal on 30-33 MHz which could be received by standard EBL 3 receivers. The signal was adjusted in phase between a ref point and a navigation point. After processing the FuG 121 displayed an angle from the beacon. By using two beacons it was possible to achieve a fix. However, this was a problem as four receivers were required, two listening to each station. On smaller aircraft there was not enough space and German industry was by now having trouble supplying enough radios to the air force without adding 4 more receivers per plane. The system was not deployed. Some sources indicate that there may have been a version called Electra that operated at 250 to 300 kHz but details are lacking or contradictory.

Sonne: This system transmitted on 270–480 kHz and could be received on a FuG 10. No special receiver was required as the pattern was discernable with the ear all that was required was the special charts. At least 6 stations were built providing coverage from the Bay of Biscay to Norway. Accuracy was reasonable during the day but errors up to 4 degrees occurred at night. The allies captured the maps with resulted in the being issued to allied units, because of this the allies left the Sonne system alone. After the war the stations were rebuilt and operated into the 1970s. The system was called Consol by that time.

Mond: Development work was done on Sonne (sun) to remove the night time errors, this system was called Mond (moon). Work was never completed.

Truhe: This system was based on the British GEE system. After British units were captured the Germans set up a project to 'clone' the units. The first unit was the FuG 122 which allowed the reception of British GEE signals. Units in France received these units and were able to navigate using British signals. The Germans then developed the concept to produce FuG 123 receivers which would allow a wider turning range. This allowed the Germans to set up GEE chains of their own further inside Germany where the British GEE signals were unusable. There seems to have been some idea of using frequencies very close to the British frequencies to make jamming by the Allies hard to do without jamming their own GEE system. One chain became operational around Berlin.

== Instrument landing systems ==
FuBL 1 Used the Lorenz landing beam system. Consisted of the EBL 1 and EBL 2 receivers with display device ANF 2. The EBL 1 operated between 30 and 33 MHz and received the azimuth signals from a transmitter at the far end of the runway, The EBL 2 operated at 38 MHz and received the two marker beacons as the aircraft approached the threshold to land. The AFN 2 provided the pilot with a left/right display and a signal strength. The pilot could also hear the azimuth signal and the marker beacons in his headset. When the aircraft passed over the beacons a light was also illuminated in the cockpit.`

FuG 125 Hermine: Was a system designed for night fighters and single pilot aircraft in night/poor visibility conditions. It consisted of several sub systems. For navigation it used the "Hermine" VHF radio beacon signal system via the Fug 16ZY. For approach and landing it used the FuBL 1 or 2 blind landing receiver. For altitude it used the Fug 101 radio altimeter. Given the pilot workload in a single pilot aircraft it also included a simple auto pilot. Fitted in some types of Fw 190 and Bf 109s. Manufactured in small numbers by Lorenz in 1945.

== Radio altimeters ==
FuG 101: FM (Frequency Modulated) CW (Continuous Wave) Altimeter. Operating frequency 337 - 400 MHz. (75 – 89 cm) Selectable between two ranges, 0 - 150 Meters and 0 - 750 Meters. Units were small enough to be fitted to single-engine day fighters and night fighters. Fitted generally at first but later in the war only to aircraft expected to operate at night. In larger aircraft usually paired with Fug 102 due to its max height limitation.

FuG 102: Pulse modulated Altimeter. Operating frequency 182 MHz. Usable between 100 Meters and 15,000 Meters. Due to its limited minimum height usually paired with Fug 101. Too large to fit in single-engined fighters.

FuG 103: Pulse Modulated Altimeter. Improved version of Fug 102 with reduced min height limitation, therefore Fug 101 could be dispensed with. Small numbers produced in 1945.

FuG 104: Improved Fug 103 by reducing its size. Development never completed.

== IFF ==
=== Flak fire control ===
FuG 25z Zwilling: This was an early IFF set designed to respond to the Würzburg. The reception frequency range was 600 MHz 50 cm. Transmitting frequency was also 600 MHz, 50 cm. When it responded the radar operator could hear a morse character in their headphones. This only worked with the Würzburg radars not Freya. It could be received at up to 30 km (19 mi).

FuG 25z Häuptling: As experience was gained it was discovered that using the system above the radar operators were unable to identify which aircraft had responded to the interrogation pulse as the basic system did not provide range. In an attempt to resolve this question a modification was applied turning the Zwilling into the Häuptling.This retransmitted the receiving pulse on the 160 MHz frequency to a receiver on the radar. However, by the time that this modification had been developed jamming of the Würzburg had commenced and the radar had been modified to work on one of three bands called "islands". As the Häuptling could not cover these bands it was abandoned and the FuG 25z was replaced by the various versions of the FuG 25a system.

Originally IFF was only considered to be of use with Flak hence the limitation above. As the war progressed it was realised that IFF should also work with early warning radars hence a new version of the FuG 25 was developed.

=== Early warning radar ===
FuG 25a Erstling: This was an IFF set designed to respond to Freya, Würzburg and the advanced, limited-deployment FuG 404 Jagdschloss system. The reception frequency range was 125 + or - 1.8 MHz. Transmitting frequency was 160 MHz. It could be received at up to 100 km (62 mi).

Würzburg radars as they worked on a different band required separate equipment to work with the FuG 25a. This was known under the name Kuckuck. It consisted of the interrogator transmitter Kur and the receiver Gemse. Dipoles were mounted inside the reflector to transmit and receive. A severe problem was encountered with the width of the resulting beam.

FuG 25a Erstling-Rot: With the introduction of PPI radars such as Jagdschloss a problem was encountered with the FuG 25a in that the dwell time of the radar was too short for the operator of the system to observe, in many cases, the mark on their screen. Earlier radars which "stared" rather than scanned did not have this problem. This modification increased the duration of the response signal so that this did not happen.

FuG 25a Erstling-Grün: In anticipation of the allies jamming of the 125/160 MHz IFF frequency this modification changed the interrogation wavelength to 2.5 meters and the response to 2 meters. No other changes were made. Never deployed.

FuG 225 Wobbelbiene: This was a development of the FuG 25z to provide a wide band receiver which would respond to the Würzburg "Island A" & "Island B" frequencies. It was hoped by doing this that the beam width problems with Fug25a would be resolved. However, by the time this was ready for production in 1944 Flak Würzburg now included "Island C' which could not be received. The unit was therefore never deployed. Further development of the basic Fug 25 was then abandoned.

FuG 226 Neuling: Intended to incorporate all the lessons using the preceding systems. The objectives of the design were; (a) Work with all anticipated service radars i.e. "staring and PPI' (b) operate at 6, later 12 frequency pairs to defeat jamming (c) for the first time provide an air-to-air mode. Development never completed.

FuG 228 Lichtenstein SN-3: The last-developed version of the Lichtenstein airborne intercept radar developed to allow night fighters fitted with it to identify one another. Transmitted and received on the same band (100 - 156 MHz). It may have been intended to use it as some sort of squadron control system. Never deployed.

FuG 229 Frischling: With the deployment starting on 9 cm band radars such as the Jagdschloss Z, a need for IFF was identified. The Frischling was an add on unit for either FuG 25a or FuG 226 that converted the 9 cm integration pulse to a standard 125 MHz pulse which was then passed it to the response unit. Development not completed.

FuG 243: By 1944 the Germans were aware of the operating concept of the British Rebecca/Eureka system via captured examples. From this a series of radar beacons were designed to respond to different frequencies and waveforms. The FuG243 seems to be the only one that entered service in small numbers in early 1945 in Norway with coastal units. It operated on the low-UHF band frequencies used by the FuG 200 Hohentwiel ASV airborne radar hardware. In modern terms it was a type of Radar beacon (racon)

== Ground-to-air data links ==
As allied jamming of the fighter voice links became increasingly effective by 1944/45 attempts were made to find other ways of passing information and commands to fighter pilots.

Nachtlicht: The receiver for this was the FuG25a IFF system. When a ground station interrogated the unit it flashed a small light to indicate this had happened to the pilot. The system involved modifying the transmitter so that the light flashed Morse signals. This allowed a very primitive way of signaling the pilot. A development of this system was to include a unit called the Luftkurier which decoded the Morse and indicated commands on a pointer (left/right). The system was trialed but it was found to be too hard for pilots to watch the indicator while piloting their aircraft. Another issue was that the Luftkurier was found to be very easy to jam.

Fug 136 Nachtfee: A development of the Nachlicht system. Used the Fug25a receiver again. This time commands were decoded onto a small CRT, which allowed up to 16 commands to be issued to the fighter. Had the same problems as Nachlicht, too easy to jam and too hard to use in a single-seater plane. Abandoned.

Fug 138 Barbara: A further development of the Nachlicht system. This time an audio receiver was added to the system between the Fug25a and the Fug16ZY. This allowed the pilot to hear Morse commands sent up the data link. Unusable in practice and abandoned.

As German pilot training was cut back due to the war situation it was realised that the above systems would be unusable as pilots were no longer being trained in Morse. This led to the Fug 120 and Fug 139 systems.

FuG 139 Barbarossa: This system again used the Fug25a receiver but fed it to a Hellschreiber printer. This removed the requirement to read Morse or continuously watch a display. Deployed in small numbers in 1945. An attempt was being made to use Pulse Modulation to also transmit voice but this was never completed.

== Emergency navigation aids ==
NS 2: Single watertight box transmitter. Operated on the international distress frequency of 500 kHz. Powered by a hand generator. Sent Morse code, no receiver. Fitted to most German aircraft expected to operate over water at the start of the war. Range 120 – 250 miles. Transmit power 8 Watts.

NS 4: Single watertight box transmitter. Operated on a frequency of 53.5 to 61 MHz. Powered by batteries. Sent Morse code, no receiver. Fitted to most German aircraft expected to operate over water from the middle of the war. Replaced NS2. Range 6 to 16 Miles. Easier to use than the NS2. Transmit power 1 to 2 watts.

FuG 141: Receiver for signals from the NS4 emergency transmitter. Fitted to air-sea rescue units. Operated with a direction finding loop.

FuG 142: Receiver to receive MW beacons. Battery powered to be used when other power had failed on an aircraft. Not deployed after service tests had revealed problems. Due to be replaced by the FuG 145.

Fug 145: Replacement for the PeiGL 6 MF receiver. Development not completed.

== Location beacons & radio sonde ==
Fug 301 & FuG 310: Radio sonde, operated suspended from a barrage balloon. Transmit frequency 13.4 MHz.

FuG 302: Radio Buoy. Dropped into the sea to mark a particular location for following aircraft. Initially transmitted at 45 MHz for detection by Fug 17, later modified to operate at 40 MHz for location by FuG 16. Used in late 1944 to guide He 111 launching V-1 over the North Sea.

FuG 303: Overland version of FuG 302.

FuG 304: Distress Radio Buoy.

FuG 305: Jammer - details lacking

FuG 308: Radio Sonde

Numerous different Radio Sonde systems were deployed by both the Army, Air Force and Navy.

An example of a ground station would be the FuG 502 Mouse . This used a transponder system working at 300 MHz to track the radio sonde and received values from it on 27 MHz. It was mounted in a trailer.

FuG 23: Location transmitter installed in some Fieseler Fi 103 (V 1) cruise missiles. Transmitted at frequencies between 340 kHz and 3.5 MHz. Allowed the missiles to be tracked. Transmitted two signals, one while the motor was running and the second when it cut off, allowing its impact point to be calculated.

FuG 230: Radio tracking beacon for various German missiles such as 'Waterfall', 'Enzian' and 'HS 117'. Operated at 600 MHz.

== Miscellaneous ==
The Luftwaffe was known to have fitted small aluminum strips which frequently carried explosive self-destruct charges onto the outside of the equipment's aluminum housings. These explosives were linked then by a delay fuse attached onto any sensitive apparatus, which allowed it to be destroyed rather than be captured by the Allies.
