= Brandenburg-Briest Solarpark =

Solar power plant

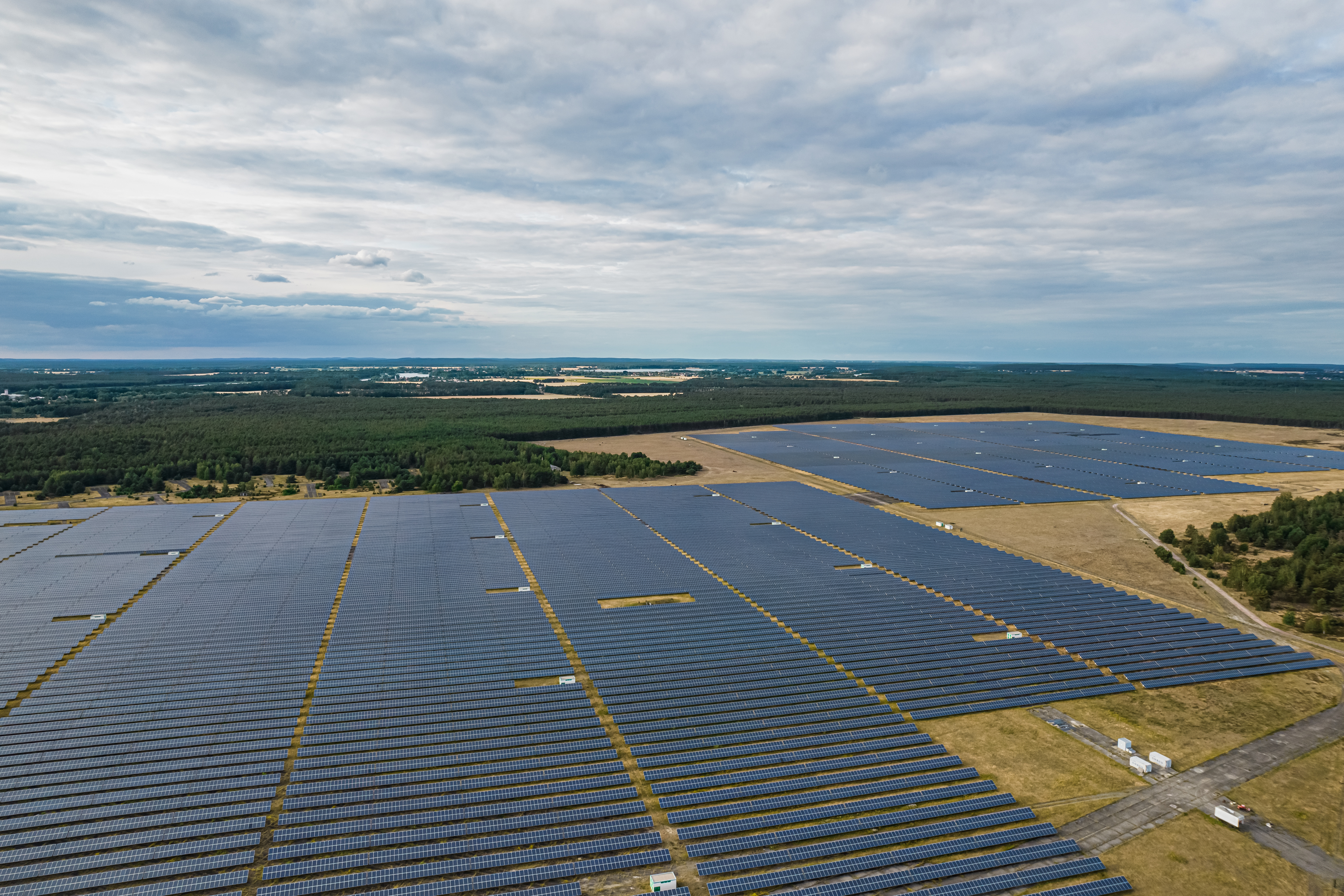
- Country: Germany
- Location: Brandenburg and Briest
- Coordinates: 52°26′12″N 12°27′05″E
- Status: Operational
- Commission date: December 2011
- Owners: Luxcara, MCG Group

Solar farm
- Type: PV crystalline silicon modules

Power generation
- Units operational: 383,000
- Nameplate capacity: 91 MW
- Annual net output: 89.5 GWh

External links
- Commons: Related media on Commons

Brandenburg-Briest Solarpark is photovoltaic power station, located at a former military airfield in Brandenburg, Germany. At the time of its completion, it was the largest solar park in Europe. Equipped with Q-Cells solar modules, it consists of three sections, namely

- Brandenburg-Briest East (30 MW)
- Brandenburg-Briest West (30 MW)
- and Briest-Havelsee (31 MW)

that add up to a total installed capacity of 91 megawatts (MW), sufficient to supply the electricity needs of more than 11,500 households.

== See also ==
- Photovoltaic power stations
- List of largest power stations in the world
- List of photovoltaic power stations
