= Y-Control for fighters =

German WW2 radio guidance system

The Y-Control System is a German aircraft radio guidance system of World War II. It was based around the work done for the Y-Gerät system of bomber guidance. There were differences in frequency and a dedicated transponder was not required. Initially it used a modified FuG17E radio but this was soon replaced by an add on to the standard radio FuG16Z turning it into the FuG16ZY.

== Origin ==
By late 1943 the Luftwaffe was facing multiple problems in navigation and control of its assets in the European airspace. Allied jamming of existing VHF voice radio links and MF navigation beacons was becoming extremely effective, At the same time training of pilots was being curtailed by the lack of fuel. This resulted in fighter formations being unable to find the allied bombers and frequently getting lost. Work was then carried out with regards to solving these issues. Part of the research resulted in the radio systems such a Hermine and Bernhard. However, a simpler system that could be rolled out faster and was usable by minimum hour pilots in single seat fighters was also developed.

== Functionality ==
The system worked by using sites known as Y-Stations. Each station had 5 radio operation systems. Each consisted of an omnidirectional transmitter an omnidirectional receiver and a direction finder. This allowed each site to control 5 fighters. The transmitter would send out a signal which was picked up by the FuG16ZY in the fighter (known as the Y Fighter), this repeated the signal back on a frequency 1.9 MHz lower than the transmitted frequency. Using the direction finder (DF) the angle was measured. Range was calculated by a timing system connected to both the transmitter and the omnidirectional receiver. Height could not be measured. However voice could be transposed onto the ranging signal allowing the ground controller to talk and listen to the pilot of the plane he was controlling, hence the pilot could report altitude when requested to do so. Controlling a single fighter was of not much use in practice so the Luftwaffe developed group control, where a Y-Fighter was part of a group of fighters intercepting an allied bomber stream, The Y-Fighter was painted a distinctive colour and the rest of the flight simple followed him. The flight leader could also listen into the ground controller channel and hear what the ground controller was saying while also being able to talk to the flight. The Y-Fighter was never the group controller. the system was susceptible to jamming on the FuG16ZY wavelength but was at least partially usable for the rest of the war. Controllable range was approx 250 km depending on aircraft height. One source mentions that relay stations could be used to extend the radio range. The relay station would consist of a single transmitter/receiver/DF finder system without the rest of the communication and guidance systems of the main Y site. The radio system used was a modified FuG16 radio. The Y-Site also contained other systems such as radio communications for talking to area control.

== Utility ==
The system was usually used to control groups of day fighters intercepting American bomber streams but it could be used to guide individual night fighters.
