= Bourdon German war cemetery =

Cemetery in Somme, France

- German War Graves Commission (Volksbund Deutsche Kriegsgräberfürsorge)
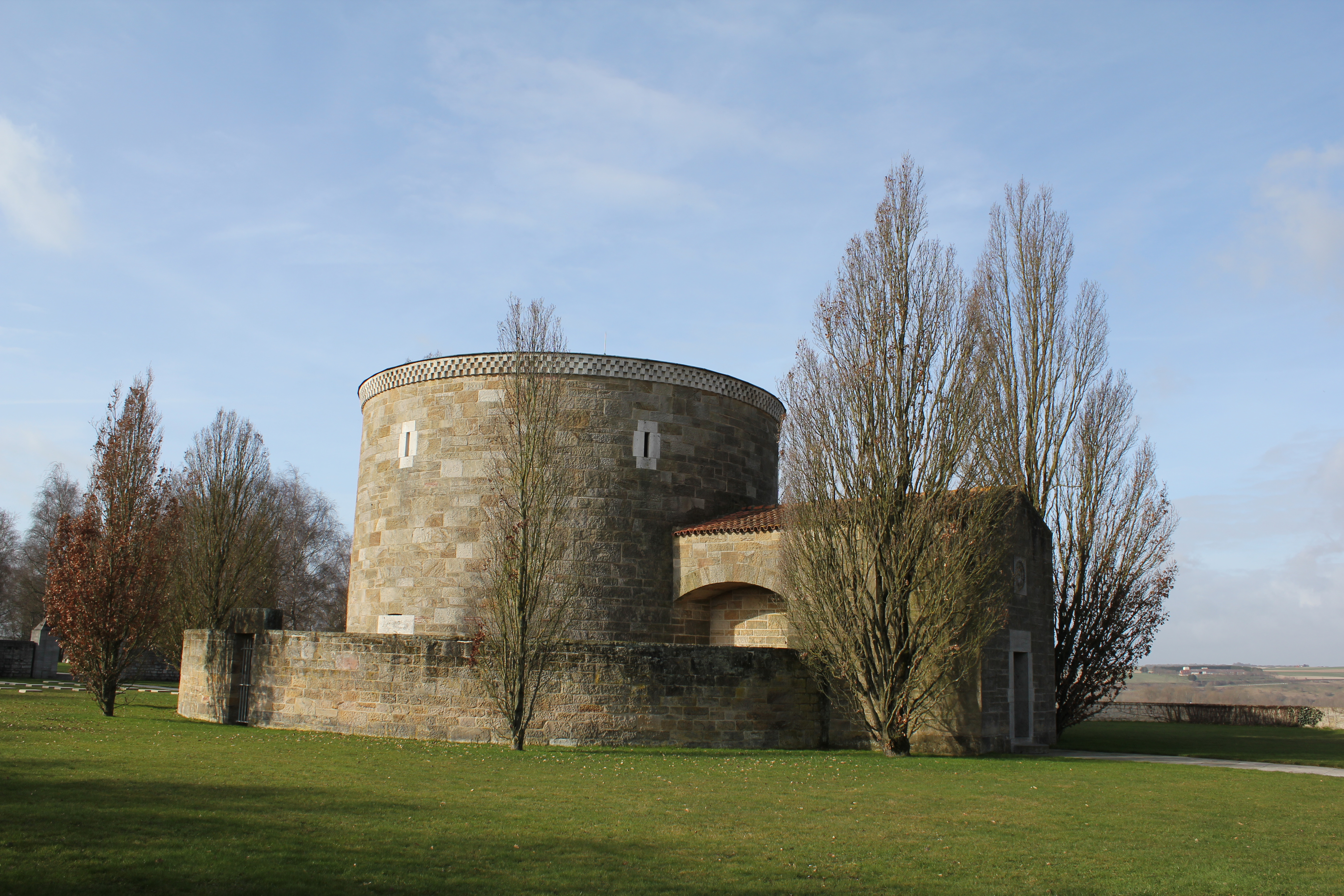
- Main building of the German war cemetery at Bourdon
- Used for those deceased
- Established: 16 September 1967
- Location: 49°59′11″N 2°05′00″E near Bourdon, Somme, France
- Designed by: Paul Schmitthenner
- Total burials: 22,216

Burials by nation
- Germany

Burials by war
- World War II

Bourdon German war cemetery is a Second World War German military war grave cemetery, located 18.5 kilometers (11.5 miles) northwest of Amiens and close to the village of Bourdon in the Somme department, France.

== Gallery ==
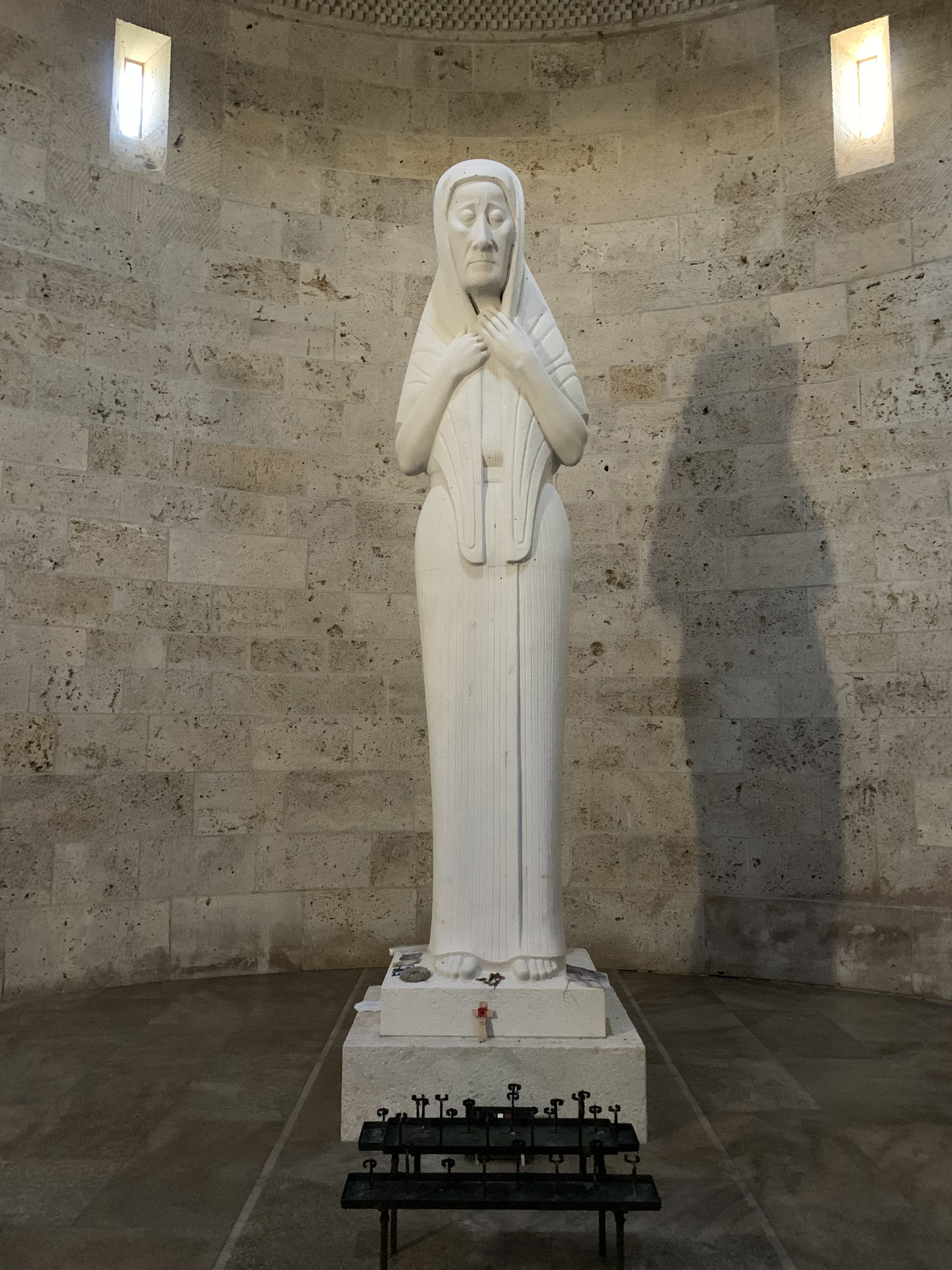
sculpture by Gerhard Marcks, Die Mutter [The Mother]
