= Bourdon, Somme =

Bourdon
- Commune
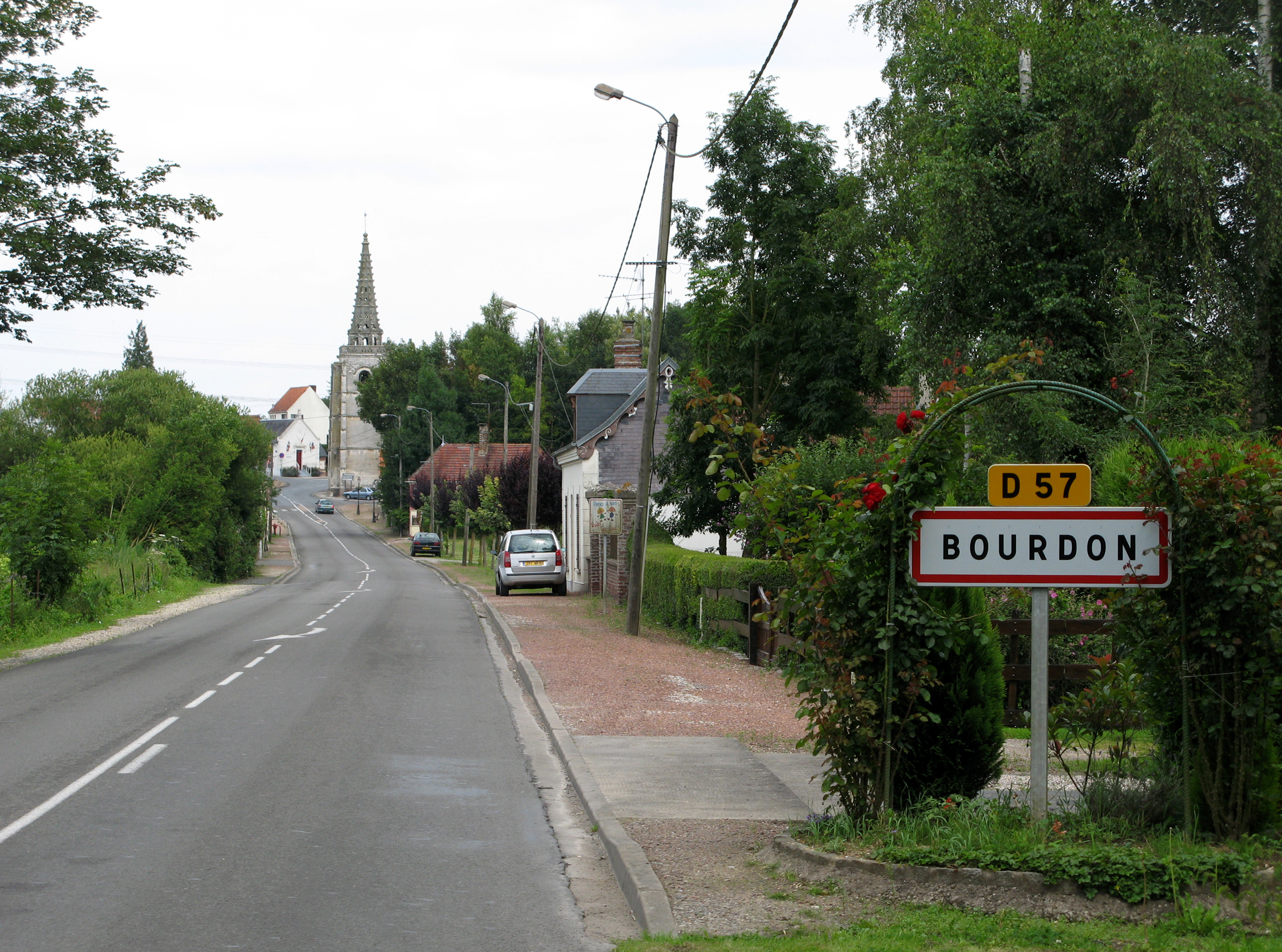
- The road into Bourdon
- Location of Bourdon
- Location within France Location within Hauts-de-France
- Coordinates: 49°59′17″N 2°04′35″E
- Country: France
- Region: Hauts-de-France
- Department: Somme
- Arrondissement: Amiens
- Canton: Ailly-sur-Somme
- Intercommunality: CC Nièvre et Somme

Government
  - Mayor (2020–2026): Anthony Delassus
- Area^{1}: 6.97 km^{2} (2.69 sq mi)
- Elevation: 24 m (79 ft)
- Highest elevation: 78 m (256 ft)
- Lowest elevation: 8 m (26 ft)
- Population (2023): 376
  - Density: 53.9/km^{2} (140/sq mi)
- Time zone: UTC+01:00 (CET)
  - Summer (DST): UTC+02:00 (CEST)
- INSEE/Postal code: 80123 /80310
- ^{1} French Land Register data, which excludes lakes, ponds, glaciers > 1 km^{2} (0.386 sq mi or 247 acres) and river estuaries.

Bourdon (French pronunciation: [buʁdɔ̃]; Picard: Bordon) is a commune in the department of Somme, Hauts-de-France, northern France.

== Geography ==
Bourdon is situated on the D81 and D57 road junction, some 10 miles (16 km) northwest of Amiens.

== Population ==
Historical population
Year	Pop.	±% p.a.
1968	259	—
1975	274	+0.81%
1982	294	+1.01%
1990	337	+1.72%
1999	373	+1.13%
2007	381	+0.27%
2012	388	+0.36%
2017	385	−0.16%
2023	376	−0.39%
Source: INSEE

== See also ==
- Communes of the Somme department
