= Werner Lucas =

German World War II fighter pilot

- Born: 27 December 1917; Berlin, Kingdom of Prussia, German Empire
- Died: 24 October 1943 (aged 25); Leiden, German-occupied Netherlands
- Cause of death: Killed in action
- Burial place: Ysselsteyn German war cemetery, Netherlands
- Military career
- Allegiance: Nazi Germany
- Branch: Luftwaffe
- Service years: 1938–1943
- Rank: Hauptmann (captain)
- Unit: JG 3
- Commands: 4./JG 3
- Conflicts: See battles World War II: Eastern Front; Operation Barbarossa; Mediterranean Theatre; Defense of the Reich †
- Awards: Knight's Cross of the Iron Cross

Werner Georg Emil Lucas (27 December 1917 – 24 October 1943) was a German Luftwaffe military aviator during World War II, a fighter ace credited with 106 enemy aircraft shot down. The majority of his victories were claimed over the Eastern Front, with one claim over the Western Front.

Born in Berlin, Lucas volunteered for military service in the Luftwaffe of Nazi Germany in 1938. Following flight training, he was posted to Jagdgeschwader 3 (JG 3—3rd Fighter Wing) in 1941. He claimed his first aerial victories in July 1941 during Operation Barbarossa, the German invasion of the Soviet Union. Following his 57th aerial victory, he was awarded the Knight's Cross of the Iron Cross on 19 September 1942. He was then appointed Staffelkapitän (squadron leader) of the 4. Staffel (4th squadron) of JG 3 which he continued to lead on the Eastern Front. He claimed his 100th aerial victory on 21 July 1943.

In October 1943, Lucas and his unit were transferred to the Western Front fighting in Defense of the Reich. In this theatre, Lucas claimed his 106th and last aerial victory before he was killed in action in aerial combat with Supermarine Spitfires on 24 October 1943.

== Military career ==
Lucas was born on 27 December 1917 in Berlin of the German Empire. Following flight training, (Note: Flight training in the Luftwaffe progressed through the levels A1, A2 and B1, B2, referred to as A/B flight training. A training included theoretical and practical training in aerobatics, navigation, long-distance flights and dead-stick landings. The B courses included high-altitude flights, instrument flights, night landings and training to handle the aircraft in difficult situations.) he was posted to the 4. Staffel (4th squadron) of Jagdgeschwader 3 (JG 3—3rd Fighter Wing) on 8 February 1941. World War II in Europe had begun on Friday 1 September 1939 when German forces invaded Poland. At the time of his posting, II. Gruppe of JG 3 was based in Arques in northern France and fighting against the Royal Air Force. On 10 February 1941, II. Gruppe was ordered to return to Germany for a period of rest and reequipment. The unit arrived at Darmstadt-Griesheim on 16 February where they received a complement of the new Messerschmitt Bf 109 F-2 fighter aircraft.

On 25 April 1941, II. Gruppe began relocating back to the English Channel Front at Monchy-Breton. The Gruppe completed relocation on 4 May and flew its first mission on 7 May 1941. On 1 June 1941, II. Gruppe began its relocation to the Eastern Front. The ground elements moved immediately while the air elements followed on 8 June. On that day, they flew to Saint-Dizier and then to Böblingen. On the following day, they continued to Breslau-Gandau, now Wrocław Airport in Poland, via Straubing.

=== Operation Barbarossa ===
In preparation for Operation Barbarossa, the German invasion of the Soviet Union, II. Gruppe headed further east on 18 June. Following a stopover at Kraków, the unit was moved to Hostynne. At the start of the campaign, JG 3 under the command of Major (Major) Günther Lützow was subordinated to the V. Fliegerkorps (5th Air Corps), under the command of General der Flieger (General of the Aviators) Robert Ritter von Greim, itself part of Luftflotte 4 (4th Air Fleet), under the command of Generaloberst (Colonel General) Alexander Löhr. These air elements supported Generalfeldmarschall (Field Marshal) Gerd von Rundstedt's Army Group South, with the objective of capturing Ukraine and its capital Kiev. At 17:00 on 21 June 1941, the 5th Air Corps, based at Lipsko, briefed the various unit commanders of the upcoming attack. (Note: All times used in this section are Central European Time unless otherwise noted.) That evening, Gruppenkommandeur (group commander) of II. Gruppe Lothar Keller informed his subordinates of the attack.

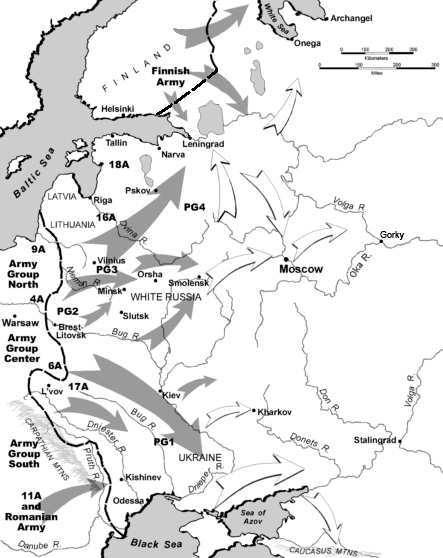
Map indicating Operation Barbarossa's attack plan

The invasion of the Soviet Union began on 22 June 1941. II. Gruppe flew its first missions on the Eastern Front shortly before 04:00, flying low attacks against Soviet airfields in the vicinity of Lvov in Ukraine. At 06:30 the Gruppe fought its first aerial battles. 4. Staffel claimed three victories and the Gruppenstab four. In the beginning of July 1941, the front in the vicinity of the northern sector of Army Group South became increasingly fluid. This necessitated the relocation of II. Gruppe to Volodymyr-Volynskyi. On 2 July, II. Gruppe claimed 23 aerial victories in the combat area west of Berdichev and Zhitomir, including the first aerial victory by Lucas. The rapid advance of German ground forces required II. Gruppe to move to Lutsk on 5 July, then to Dubno that evening and to Miropol on 10 July. That day, Lucas claimed three Tupolev TB-3 bombers shot down. He and his wingman, Oberleutnant (First Lieutenant) Franz Beyer, had encountered twelve TB-3s from 14 Tyazhyolyy Bombardirovochnyy Aviatsionnyy (14 TBAP—14th Heavy Bomber Aviation Regiment). The two pilots claimed five of the bombers destroyed while Soviet records indicate that seven were lost.

On 8 August 1941, Lucas became an "ace-in-a-day" for the first time, shooting down five Soviet bombers in combat near the Dnieper river. On 31 October 1941, II. Gruppe flew its last combat mission over the northern Crimean combat zone and was ordered to retreat to Germany for a period of rest and refurbishment. On 1 December 1941, JG 3 was given the honorary name "Udet" following the suicide of World War I fighter pilot and Luftwaffe Generalleutnant Ernst Udet.

=== Mediterranean Theatre ===
At Wiesbaden-Erbenheim airfield, II. Gruppe was equipped with Bf 109 F-4 trop as the unit was to be deployed in the Mediterranean Theatre. After almost two months of rest, II. Gruppe was ordered to transfer to Sicily in early January 1942. Lucas was awarded the German Cross in Gold (Deutsches Kreuz in Gold) on 27 March 1942. II. Gruppe flew its last combat mission over Malta on 25 April 1942. On 27 April, II. Gruppe arrived at Plzeň where it was placed under the command of Hauptmann (Captain) Kurt Brändle.

=== Eastern Front ===
After three weeks of rest, II. Gruppe was moved to the southern sector of the Eastern Front and placed under control of VIII. Fliegerkorps (8th Air Corps) on the left wing of Army Group South. On 15 July, II. Gruppe was moved to an airfield at Millerovo. Flying from this airfield, Lucas claimed his 33rd and 34th aerial victory. On 27 July 1942, Lucas flew on a fighter escort mission for nine Junkers Ju 87 dive bombers and claimed his 39th and 40th aerial victory. The flight was intercepted by Yakovlev Yak-7 fighters from 434 Istrebitelny Aviatsionny Polk (434 IAP—434rd Fighter Aviation Regiment). In this encounter, Lucas claimed two Yakovlev fighters shot down. It is possible that his opponents were Mládshiy Leytenánt Kukushin and Serzhánt Smirnov, who both were shot down that day.

On 20 August 1942, for the second time in his combat career, Lucas became an "ace-in-a-day". On his first combat mission of the day, he claimed an Ilyushin Il-2 dive bomber destroyed, followed by four Petlyakov Pe-2 bombers within six minutes, taking his total to 52 aerial victories. On 19 September 1942, Lucas received the Knight's Cross of the Iron Cross (Ritterkreuz des Eisernen Kreuzes) for 57 air victories. In November 1942, Lucas was appointed Staffelkapitän of the 4. Staffel of JG 3. He thus succeeded Hauptmann Gerhard Wendt who was posted to a staff position with Luftflotte 4. In December, Lucas volunteered for the Platzschutzstaffel (airfield defence squadron) of the Pitomnik Airfield. The Staffel, largely made up from volunteers from I. and II. Gruppe of JG 3, was responsible for providing fighter escort to Junkers Ju 52 transport aircraft and Heinkel He 111 bombers shuttling supplies for the encircled German forces fighting in the Battle of Stalingrad. On 21 July 1943, Lucas was credited with his 100th aerial victory. He was the 47th Luftwaffe pilot to achieve the century mark. During the Donbass Strategic Offensive, II. Gruppe supported the 6th Army on the Mius-Front. On 31 July 1943, II. Gruppe claimed 17 aerial victories in this sector, including two by Lucas, his last two claims on the Eastern Front. On 2 August, the Gruppe was ordered to return to Germany.

=== Defense of the Reich and death ===
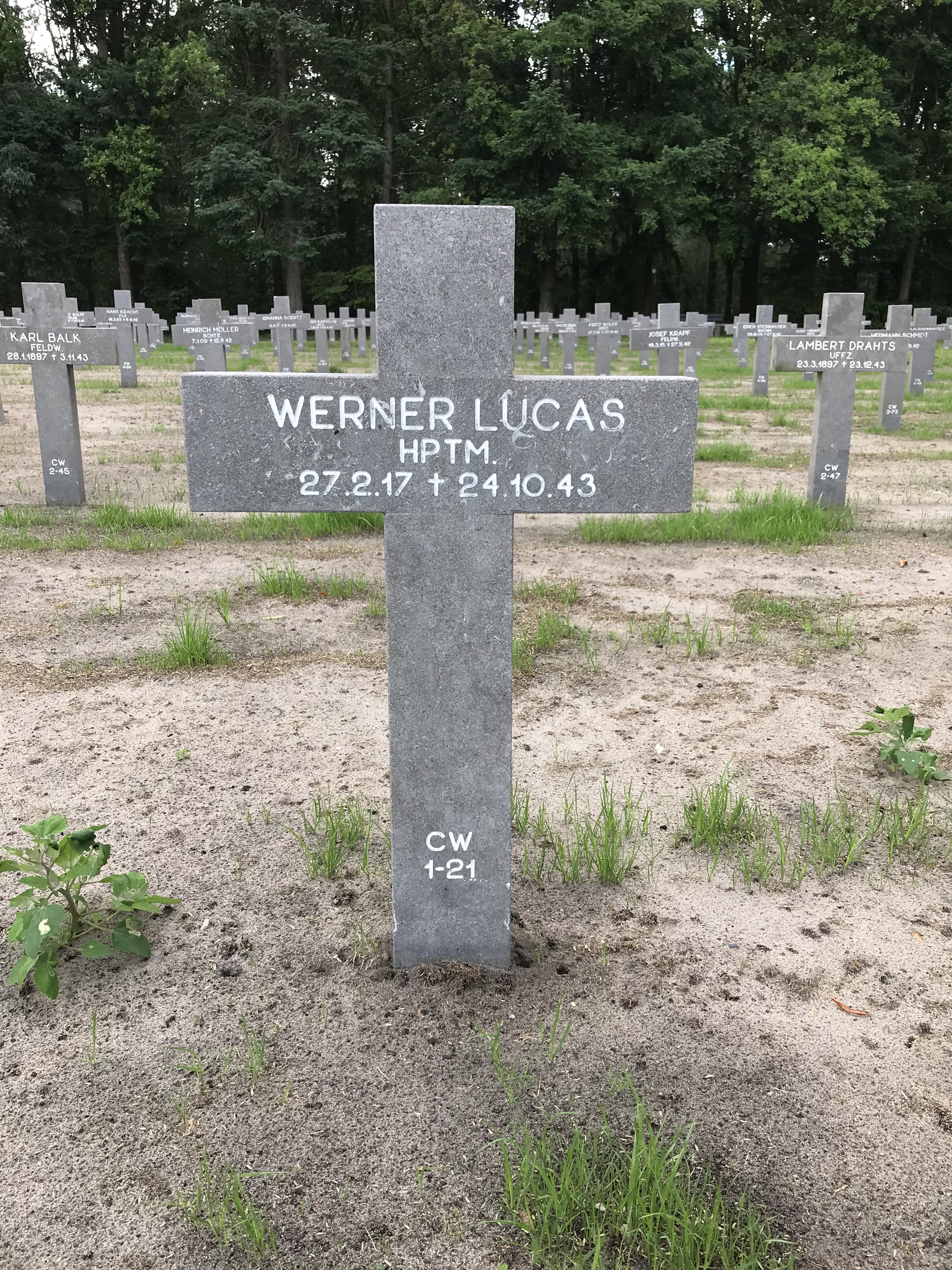
Ysselsteyn German war cemetery grave CW 1-21

The increasing daytime attacks of the United States Army Air Forces (USAAF) Eighth Air Force against targets in western Europe forced the Luftwaffe to transfer more and more fighter units from the Eastern Front back to Germany in Defense of the Reich. The Gruppe spent one-month training in northern Germany before they arrived at the Schiphol airfield near Amsterdam in the Netherlands on 12 September. On 3 August 1943, II. Gruppe's air elements arrived at Uetersen Airfield in northern Germany. On 20 October, the USAAF targeted Düren. II. Gruppe intercepted the bombers near Venlo but were fended off by the escorting Republic P-47 Thunderbolt fighters. Elements of II. Gruppe managed to reach the bombers on their return. Two Boeing B-17 Flying Fortress bombers were shot down, including one by Lucas.

Whilst with JG 3 flying from Schiphol, he was killed in combat with Supermarine Spitfires, possibly escorting USAAF B-17 Flying Fortress bombers, on 24 October 1943. His Bf 109 G-6 (Werknummer 27080 —factory number) crashed in the city centre of Leiden, Netherlands. He on purpose, crashed his aircraft in the courtyard of a hospital on the Hooigracht, thus taking no other people with him than his 106 kills.

== Summary of career ==
=== Aerial victory claims ===
According to US historian David T. Zabecki, Lucas was credited with 106 aerial victories. Mathews and Foreman, authors of Luftwaffe Aces — Biographies and Victory Claims, researched the German Federal Archives and found records for 105 aerial victory claims, plus one further unconfirmed claim. This figure includes 104 aerial victories on the Eastern Front and a four-engined bomber over the Western Allies.

Victory claims were logged to a map-reference (PQ = Planquadrat), for example "PQ 47844". The Luftwaffe grid map (Jägermeldenetz) covered all of Europe, western Russia and North Africa and was composed of rectangles measuring 15 minutes of latitude by 30 minutes of longitude, an area of about 360 square miles (930 km^{2}). These sectors were then subdivided into 36 smaller units to give a location area 3 km × 4 km (1.9 mi × 2.5 mi) in size.

Chronicle of aerial victories
This and the ♠ (Ace of spades) indicates those aerial victories which made Lucas an "ace-in-a-day", a term which designates a fighter pilot who has shot down five or more airplanes in a single day. This and the ? (question mark) indicates information discrepancies listed by Prien, Stemmer, Rodeike, Bock, Mathews and Foreman.
Claim	Date	Time	Type	Location	Claim	Date	Time	Type	Location
– 4. Staffel of Jagdgeschwader 3 "Udet" – Operation Barbarossa — 22 June – 1 November 1941
1? (Note: According to Mathews and Foreman this claim is unconfirmed.)	2 July 1941	06:20	I-16	6 km (3.7 mi) south of Krylow	17	25 August 1941	05:45	Pe-2	Janzewo
2	10 July 1941	19:22	TB-3	5 km (3.1 mi) east of Korostyshiv	18	30 August 1941	12:19	DB-3	7 km (4.3 mi) southwest of Nowokosmosk
3	10 July 1941	19:30	TB-3	6 km (3.7 mi) west of Maidanowka	19	30 August 1941	12:25	DB-3	4 km (2.5 mi) south of Nikolajewskaja
4	10 July 1941	19:33	TB-3	Chromovka	20	2 September 1941	06:45	DB-3	Dumchailowka
5	26 July 1941	06:39	I-153	west of Chrebjonka	21	3 September 1941	13:38	V-11 (Il-2)	10 km (6.2 mi) west of Kobeljaki
6	26 July 1941	10:59	V-11 (Il-2)	south of Germanowka	22	6 September 1941	18:25	SB-3	Koselschtschina
7	8 August 1941	13:40	DB-3	6 km (3.7 mi) south of Gorodishche	23	7 September 1941	05:30	I-180 (Yak-7)	7 km (4.3 mi) west of Woskabojnia
8	9 August 1941	04:50	DB-3	12 km (7.5 mi) east of Pawlitsch	24	13 September 1941	17:25? (Note: According to Mathews and Foreman claimed at 17:26.)	V-11 (Il-2)	10 km (6.2 mi) east of Balakliia
9	12 August 1941	07:45	DB-3	Knajschitschij	25	23 September 1941	16:35	I-153	10 km (6.2 mi) northeast of Kotowka
10♠	17 August 1941	09:07	DB-3	Boschedarowka	26	25 September 1941	07:23	I-26 (Yak-1)	east of Kirkowka
11♠	17 August 1941	09:08	DB-3	8 km (5.0 mi) east of Adamowka	27	25 September 1941	14:45	DB-3	12 km (7.5 mi) southeast of Senkow
12♠	17 August 1941	09:15	DB-3	5 km (3.1 mi) northeast of Tschumaki	28	28 September 1941	14:47	Pe-2	5 km (3.1 mi) east of Nowokosmosk
13♠	17 August 1941	17:50	SB-3	Raduschnaja	29	29 September 1941	10:25	I-180 (Yak-7)	5 km (3.1 mi) southeast of Pestschanoje
14♠	17 August 1941	17:55	SB-3	Apostolove	30	8 October 1941	13:15	Pe-2	10 km (6.2 mi) east of Mosalsk
15	21 August 1941	16:35	DB-3	8 km (5.0 mi) southwest of Pismenaja	31	17 October 1941	09:15	I-26 (Yak-1)	5 km (3.1 mi) east of Kurulu-Kiptschok
16	21 August 1941	16:43	DB-3	6 km (3.7 mi) southeast of Iwkowka	32	18 October 1941	13:11	I-61 (MiG-3)	Kadshanbak
– 4. Staffel of Jagdgeschwader 3 "Udet" – Eastern Front — 26 April 1942 – 3 February 1943
33	15 July 1942	15:15	DB-3	5 km (3.1 mi) west of Naro-Fominsk	54	13 September 1942	06:58	Pe-2	PQ 47844, Konopatja
34	15 July 1942	16:50	Pe-2	5 km (3.1 mi) northeast of Millerovo	55	13 September 1942	07:03	Pe-2	PQ 47682, Konopatja
35	20 July 1942	11:59	Il-2	Olchowskij	56	15 September 1942	09:12	Il-2	PQ 47842, Rashdestoweno
36	21 July 1942	09:07	Il-2	3 km (1.9 mi) south of Strachowskij	57	15 September 1942	14:44	Pe-2	3 km (1.9 mi) east of Krestowo
37	23 July 1942	17:30	Il-2	10 km (6.2 mi) northeast of Tschernschowskaja	58	23 September 1942	07:17	LaGG-3	5 km (3.1 mi) west of Straschewitschi
38	26 July 1942	15:14	Pe-2	4 km (2.5 mi) northwest of Dmitrijewka	59	15 October 1942	08:58	LaGG-3	PQ 38614, Paralesok
39	27 July 1942	16:02	Yak-1	6 km (3.7 mi) south of Dubinskij	60	26 November 1942	12:17	Il-2	8 km (5.0 mi) west of Beljin
40	27 July 1942	16:05	Yak-1	6 km (3.7 mi) northwest of Marinowka	61	26 November 1942	12:19	Il-2	10 km (6.2 mi) northwest of Beljin
41	4 August 1942	17:35	Pe-2	6 km (3.7 mi) southwest of "Haltepunkt 75km" (stopping point 75 km)	62	30 November 1942	13:56	Il-2	10 km (6.2 mi) southeast of Beljin
42	5 August 1942	04:30	Pe-2	10 km (6.2 mi) west of Tschapurniki	63	3 December 1942	12:37	Il-2	35 km (22 mi) west of Beljin
43	5 August 1942	04:35	MiG-1	28 km (17 mi) west of Tschapurniki	64	17 December 1942	11:35	Pe-2	8 km (5.0 mi) south of Kotluban train station
44	6 August 1942	14:40	R-5	8 km (5.0 mi) north of Flodowitoje	65	17 December 1942	11:36	Pe-2	5 km (3.1 mi) east of Gnilowskoje
45	7 August 1942	17:47	Pe-2	3 km (1.9 mi) east of Klischewskij	66	19 December 1942	09:30	Il-2	3 km (1.9 mi) west of Akimowskij
46	17 August 1942	05:20	Il-2	6 km (3.7 mi) southwest of Prudkij	67	19 December 1942	09:50	Il-2	9 km (5.6 mi) northwest of Dmitirjewka
47	19 August 1942	17:44	Il-2	6 km (3.7 mi) east of Katschalinskaja	68	5 January 1943	07:10	La-5	PQ 19591, Krasno Snamenko
48♠	20 August 1942	04:33	Il-2	6 km (3.7 mi) east of Gratschij	69	5 January 1943	07:20	La-5	6 km (3.7 mi) northwest of Prokowskij
49♠	20 August 1942	04:40	Pe-2	18 km (11 mi) west of Pitschugi	70	15 January 1943	13:00	PS-84? (Note: According to Mathews and Foreman claimed as an Ilyushin DB-3.)	9 km (5.6 mi) northwest of Kotluban train station
50♠	20 August 1942	04:42	Pe-2	6 km (3.7 mi) northeast of Warlamow	71	15 January 1943	13:04	PS-84?	PQ 49183, west of Pitomnik
51♠	20 August 1942	04:43	Pe-2	6 km (3.7 mi) east of Arakanzew	72	15 January 1943	13:08	PS-84?	5 km (3.1 mi) southwest of Ssamofalowka
52♠	20 August 1942	04:46	Pe-2	6 km (3.7 mi) east of Pantschino	73	1 February 1943	11:55	Boston	PQ 99833, west Korolewka
53	21 August 1942	17:45	Il-2	9 km (5.6 mi) northeast of Dubowy Owrag					
– 4. Staffel of Jagdgeschwader 3 "Udet" – Eastern Front — 4 February – 3 August 1943
74	10 February 1943	09:00	Il-2	PQ 34 Ost 99454, Kuschilowka	90♠	5 July 1943	09:15	Pe-2	PQ 35 Ost 61112, 3 km (1.9 mi) west of Dmitrijewka
75	20 April 1943	10:04	Boston	PQ 34 Ost 75453, 15 km (9.3 mi) southwest of Novorossiysk	91♠	5 July 1943	09:30	Il-2	PQ 35 Ost 61342, 6 km (3.7 mi) southwest of Tomarowka
76	20 April 1943	16:00	Boston, 10 km (6.2 mi) south of Novorossiysk	PQ 34 Ost 75454	92♠	5 July 1943	18:05	Il-2	PQ 35 Ost 61483, 15 km (9.3 mi) south-southeast of Belgorod
77	20 April 1943	16:05	Boston	PQ 34 Ost 75781, 30 km (19 mi) southwest of Novorossiysk	93	6 July 1943	17:13	Il-2	PQ 35 Ost 61661, west of Titowka
78	23 April 1943	17:04	LaGG-3	PQ 34 Ost 75433, 10 km (6.2 mi) south of Novorossiysk	94	7 July 1943	04:30	Il-2	PQ 35 Ost 61362, Polonnaja
79	23 April 1943	17:08	LaGG-3	PQ 34 Ost 75497, 9 km (5.6 mi) south-southeast of Karbadinka	95	7 July 1943	04:34	Il-2	PQ 35 Ost 61532, Pokaljannoje
80	6 May 1943	13:45	LaGG-3	PQ 35 Ost 71153, north of Koschtschejewo	96	15 July 1943	14:45	Il-2	PQ 35 Ost 61253, Schachowa
81	7 May 1943	16:30	La-5	PQ 34 Ost, 5 km (3.1 mi) southwest of Gretscheskoje	97	15 July 1943	14:50	Il-2	PQ 35 Ost 71147, Kolomizewo
82	9 May 1943	08:57	La-5	PQ 34 Ost 75252, 15 km (9.3 mi) west-southwest of Krymskaja	98	19 July 1943	12:20	Il-2	PQ 34 Ost 88422, Semenowskij
83	8 June 1943	11:12	LaGG-3	PQ 35 Ost 61213, 5 km (3.1 mi) southwest of Prochorowka	99	19 July 1943	18:20	Il-2	PQ 34 Ost 88233, 2 km (1.2 mi) east of Dmitrijewka
84	8 June 1943	11:22	La-5	PQ 35 Ost 61243, 6 km (3.7 mi) northeast of Lucki	100	21 July 1943	08:05	Il-2	PQ 34 Ost 88252, Sour-Mglinskij
85	16 June 1943	03:35	Yak-1	PQ 35 Ost 60294, 3 km (1.9 mi) southeast of Annowka	101	21 July 1943	14:10	Yak-1	PQ 34 Ost 88211, south of Tschistjakowo
86	19 June 1943	15:57	Pe-2	PQ 35 Ost 61431, near Melechowo	102	22 July 1943	04:13	Il-2	PQ 34 Ost 88183, 1 km (0.62 mi) northeast of Kuteinykove
87	21 June 1943	14:32	Il-2	PQ 35 Ost 53462, 5 km (3.1 mi) northwest of Borissowka	103	30 July 1943	17:12	Il-2	PQ 34 Ost 88261, 1 km (0.62 mi) south of Marinowka
88♠	5 July 1943	03:25	Il-2? (Note: According to Prien and Stemmer claimed as a Yakovlev Yak-1. According to Mathews and Foreman claimed as a Yakovlev Yak-7.)	PQ 35 Ost 60182, north of Skripaj	104	31 July 1943	11:00	Il-2	PQ 34 Ost 88264, 6 km (3.7 mi) east of Gregorjewka
89♠	5 July 1943	04:05	Il-2	PQ 35 Ost 60334, Butowka	105	31 July 1943	11:13	Il-2	PQ 34 Ost 88283, 3 km (1.9 mi) east of Aleksejewka
– 4. Staffel of Jagdgeschwader 3 "Udet" – Defense of the Reich — 12 September – 24 October 1943
106	20 October 1943	14:45? (Note: According to Prien and Stemmer claimed at 14:39.)	B-17	PQ 05 Ost S/KN 9, 3 km (1.9 mi) south of Venray					

=== Awards ===
- Iron Cross (1939) 2nd and 1st Class
- Honor Goblet of the Luftwaffe on 2 October 1941 as Unteroffizier and pilot
- German Cross in Gold on 27 March 1942 Feldwebel in the 4./Jagdgeschwader 3 (Note: According to Obermaier on 2 April 1942.)
- Knight's Cross of the Iron Cross on 19 September 1942 as Feldwebel and pilot in the 4./Jagdgeschwader 3 "Udet"
