= Eberhard von Boremski =

German World War II flying ace (1914–1963)

- Boremski, photo taken during World War II
- Born: 24 September 1914; Conow, Grand Duchy of Mecklenburg-Schwerin, German Empire
- Died: 16 December 1963 (aged 49); Hamburg, West Germany
- Military career
- Allegiance: Nazi Germany
- Branch: Luftwaffe
- Service years: 1935–1945
- Rank: Hauptmann (captain)
- Commands: 12./JG 3
- Conflicts: World War II: Battle of France; Battle of Britain; Operation Barbarossa
- Awards: Knight's Cross of the Iron Cross

Eberhard von Boremski (24 September 1914 – 16 December 1963) was a fighter pilot in the Luftwaffe of Nazi Germany during World War II. A flying ace, he was credited with 104 aerial victories—that is, 104 aerial combat encounters resulting in the destruction of the enemy aircraft—claimed in roughly 630 combat missions. Boremski was a recipient of the Knight's Cross of the Iron Cross. He was killed in an accident in Hamburg on 16 December 1963.

== Early life and career ==
Boremski was born 24 September 1914 in Conow, present-day part of Malliß, near Ludwigslust in the Grand Duchy of Mecklenburg-Schwerin within the German Empire. He joined the Luftwaffe in 1935, and following flight training, (Note: Flight training in the Luftwaffe progressed through the levels A1, A2 and B1, B2, referred to as A/B flight training. A training included theoretical and practical training in aerobatics, navigation, long-distance flights and dead-stick landings. The B courses included high-altitude flights, instrument flights, night landings and training to handle the aircraft in difficult situations.) initially served in 5. Staffel (5th squadron) of Trägergruppe 186, which became II. Gruppe (2nd group) of Jagdgeschwader 77 (JG 77—77th Fighter Wing). (Note: For an explanation of Luftwaffe unit designations see Organisation of the Luftwaffe during World War II.) On 1 March 1940, holding the rank of Unteroffizier (corporal), he was transferred to the newly created 7. Staffel of Jagdgeschwader 3 (JG 3—3rd Fighter Wing), a squadron of III. Gruppe. On 1 March 1940, III. Gruppe of JG 3 was formed at Jena under the command of Hauptmann Walter Kienitz. 7. Staffel was headed by Oberleutnant Erwin Neuerburg, also a former member of JG 77. The Gruppe was initially equipped with the Messerschmitt Bf 109 E-1 and E-3 variant.

== World War II ==
World War II in Europe had begun on Friday 1 September 1939 when German forces invaded Poland. On 28 March 1940, III. Gruppe of JG 3 was considered operationally ready and transferred to Detmold Airfield where it was tasked with defending Germany's western border during the "Phoney War". On 10 April, the Gruppe relocated to Hopsten Airfield. In preparation for the Battle of France, III. Gruppe was subordinated to Luftflotte 2, supporting Army Group Bs attack into the Netherlands. Boremski claimed his first aerial victory on 29 May during the Battle of Dunkirk when he shot down a Royal Air Force (RAF) Supermarine Spitfire fighter on an early evening mission to the combat area. On 5 June, German forced launched Fall Rot (Case Red), the second phase of the conquest of France. Two days later, III. Gruppe fought in the vicinity of Beauvais where Boremski claimed a French Bréguet 693 ground-attack aircraft shot down. Following the Armistice of 22 June 1940, III. Gruppe was ordered to Dieppe on 29 June where the unit was tasked with patrolling the French coast at the English Channel.

On 30 June, III. Gruppe flew two fighter intercept missions against RAF forces attacking various targets near Lille. Defending against these attacks, Boremski, flying with 7. Staffel, claimed a Hawker Hurricane fighter shot down which was not confirmed. On 1 September, during the Battle of Britain, command of III. Gruppe was transferred to Hauptmann Wilhelm Balthasar when the former commander Kienitz had fallen ill. Boremski shot down the Bristol Blenheim bomber T1794 of No. 139 Squadron RAF on 24 September 1940. The Blenheim was on a mission against E-boats and fell into the English Channel. Squadron Leader M. F. Hendry, Sergeant P. M. Davidson and Sergeant V. Arrowsmith were killed in action. On 15 February 1941, III. Gruppe was ordered to Gütersloh Airfield in Germany for a period of rest and replenishment. At Gütersloh, the Gruppe received a full complement of the then new Bf 109 F-2 variant. On 3 May, III. Gruppe moved back to the English Channel front where it was based at Lillers. There, Boremski claimed his last aerial victory over the RAF on 25 May 1941. On 9 June, III. Gruppe was withdrawn from the west and ordered to transfer to Breslau-Gandau, now known as 'Wrocław Airport' in Poland.

=== War against the Soviet Union ===
On 18 June, III. Gruppe relocated to Moderówka in south-eastern Poland. On 22 June, German forces launched Operation Barbarossa, the German invasion of the Soviet Union. At the start of the campaign, JG 3 was subordinated to the V. Fliegerkorps (5th Air Corps), under command of General der Flieger Robert Ritter von Greim, which was part of Luftflotte 4 (4th Air Fleet), under command of Generaloberst Alexander Löhr. These air elements supported Generalfeldmarschall Gerd von Rundstedt's Heeresgruppe Süd (Army Group South), with the objective of capturing Ukraine and its capital Kiev. Boremski, who was now assigned to 9. Staffel under command of Oberleutnant Viktor Bauer, claimed his first aerial victories on the Eastern Front on 25 June. Operating from Moderówka, he had filed claim for two Potez 63 bombers which were misidentified Petlyakov Pe-2 bombers. On 26 June, III. Gruppe relocated to Hostynne.

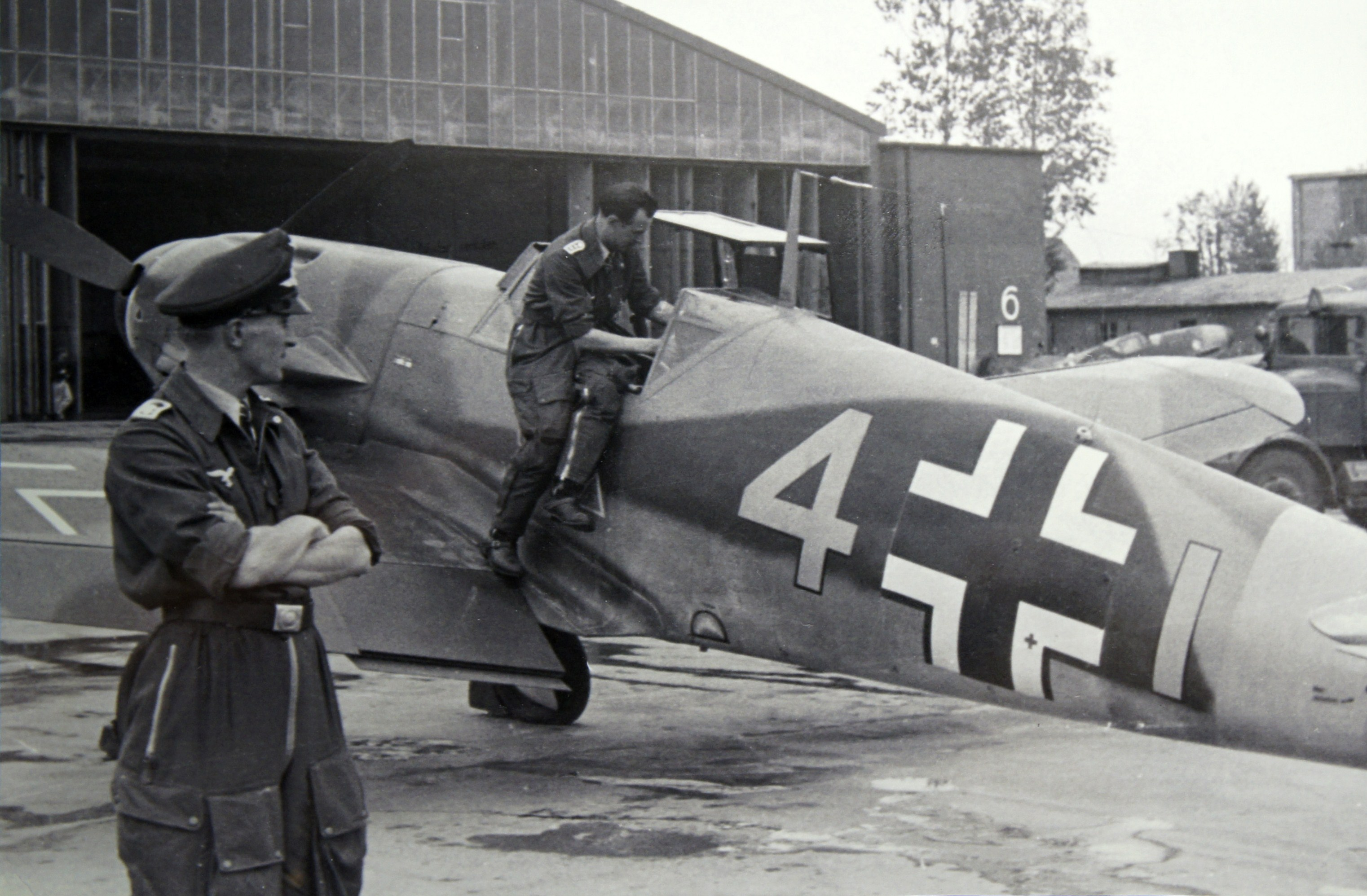
Boremski sitting on his Bf 109, May 1942. (Note: The picture was taken at Straubing between 13 and 16 May 1942 prior to the deployment to Chuguev. 9. Staffel had just received factory new Bf 109 F-4 (Werknummer 13220) aircraft at Wiesbaden-Erbenheim Airfield.)

On 6 November, III. Gruppe was withdrawn from the Eastern Front and sent to Mannheim-Sandhofen Airfield for a period of rest and replenishment. The first elements of the Gruppe arrived by train in Mannheim on 8 December, the transfer was completed a week later. There, the personnel was sent on home leave. Following the death of Generaloberst Ernst Udet, Reichsmarschall Hermann Göring ordered JG 3 to be given the honorary name "Udet" on 1 December. The Gruppe received a full complement of 41 Bf 109 F-4 aircraft and on 6 January 1942 was ordered to relocated to Sicily. On 13 January, 7. Staffel and elements of 8. and 9. Staffel boarded a train to Bari in southern Italy while the rest of III. Gruppe headed for Sciacca, Sicily. The relocation progressed until 26 January when new orders were received, ordering the Gruppe to return to Germany. At Jesau near Königsberg, present-day Kaliningrad in Russia, III. Gruppe began preparations for redeployment to the Eastern Front.

Supporting German forces fighting in the Demyansk Pocket on 18 February 1942, Boremski claimed a Mikoyan-Gurevich MiG-3 fighter shot down, which may have been misidentified Lavochkin-Gorbunov-Gudkov LaGG-3 fighters. On 3 May 1942, he was awarded the Knight's Cross of the Iron Cross (Ritterkreuz des Eisernen Kreuzes) for achieving 43 victories. After serving as an instructor with Ergänzungsgruppe Süd in mid 1942, he returned to JG 3. In February 1943, he was made Staffelkapitän (squadron leader) of 7. Staffel of JG 3. On 7 March, his 7. Staffel was ordered to Dnipropetrovsk where they formed the Deutsch-Königlich Rumänischen Jagdverband (German Royal Romanian Fighter Unit) of Luftflotte 4, in collaboration with the Royal Romanian Air Force. Boremski was placed in command of this unit. Boremski served in these roles until 30 May 1943, when he was wounded on account of his Bf 109 G-2 (Werknummer 14808—factory number) suffering engine failure resulting in a forced landing 10 km (6.2 mi) southeast of Kamianske. Consequently, he was succeeded by Hauptmann Karl-Heinz Langer as commander of 7. Staffel.

=== Later war service ===
On 7 August 1943 following his convalescence, Boremski was posted to Ergänzungs-Jagdgruppe Ost (EJGr Ost—Supplementary Fighter Group, East), a specialized training unit for new fighter pilots destined for the Eastern Front, where he served as a fighter pilot instructor. Here, he was awarded the German Cross in Gold (Deutsches Kreuz in Gold) on 23 August.

On 24 February 1944, Oberleutnant Herbert Kutscha, the commander of 12. Staffel of JG 3 was wounded in combat. In consequence, Boremski took command of the Staffel the following day. On 11 April, Boremski flying Bf 109 G-6 (Werknummer 162585) was wounded following a mid-air collision west of Anklam with Gefreiter Horst Witzler from 10. Staffel. Although both pilots bailed out, command of 12. Staffel was transferred to Leutnant Hans Rachner.

From September 1944 to November 1944, Boremski led 1. Staffel of Jagdgruppe Ost and then 9. Staffel of Ergänzungs-Jagdgeschwader 1 (EJG 1—1st Supplementary Fighter Wing). In January 1945, Boremski was credited with his 100th aerial victory. He was the 97th Luftwaffe pilot to achieve the century mark.

== Later life ==
After the German surrender, Boremski was handed over by U.S. troops in Czechoslovakia to the Soviet armed forces, and he remained a prisoner of war until 1955. He died in an accident in Hamburg on 16 December 1963.

== Summary of career ==
=== Aerial victory claims ===
According to US historian David T. Zabecki, Boremski was credited with 104 aerial victories. Obermaier also lists Boremski with 104 aerial victories claimed on 630 combat missions. This figure includes 100 claims on the Eastern Front, and four on the Western Front. Author Spick lists him with 90 aerial victories and a mission-to-claim ratio of 7.00. Mathews and Foreman, authors of Luftwaffe Aces — Biographies and Victory Claims, researched the German Federal Archives and state that he claimed at least 88 aerial victories, plus two unconfirmed claims. Four of his aerial victories were claimed on the Western Front, the others on the Eastern Front. The authors indicate that he probably claimed further aerial victories with EJG 1 which cannot be verified through the archives.

Victory claims were logged to a map-reference (PQ = Planquadrat), for example "PQ 4932". The Luftwaffe grid map (Jägermeldenetz) covered all of Europe, western Russia and North Africa and was composed of rectangles measuring 15 minutes of latitude by 30 minutes of longitude, an area of about 360 square miles (930 km^{2}). These sectors were then subdivided into 36 smaller units to give a location area 3 km × 4 km (1.9 mi × 2.5 mi) in size.

Chronicle of aerial victories
This and the – (dash) indicates unconfirmed aerial victory claims for which Boremski did not receive credit. This and the ? (question mark) indicates information discrepancies listed by Prien, Stemmer, Rodeike, Bock, Mathews and Foreman.
Claim	Date	Time	Type	Location	Claim	Date	Time	Type	Location
– 9. Staffel of Jagdgeschwader 3 – Battle of France — 10 May – 25 June 1940
1	29 May 1940	18:45	Spitfire	Dunkirk	2	7 June 1940	12:05	Bréguet 693	Poix/Auraines
– 7. Staffel of Jagdgeschwader 3 – (Note: According to Mathews and Foremann, with 9. Staffel of Jagdgeschwader 3.) At the Channel and over England — June 1940
—	30 June 1940	—	Hurricane						
– 9. Staffel of Jagdgeschwader 3 – At the Channel and over England — September 1940 – 9 June 1941
3	24 September 1940	14:05	Blenheim		4	25 May 1941	07:55? (Note: According to Mathews and Foreman claimed at 07:45.)	Hurricane	west of Calais
– 9. Staffel of Jagdgeschwader 3 – Operation Barbarossa — 22 June – 6 November 1941
5	25 June 1941	07:40	Potez 63		16	12 July 1941	10:28	DB-3	
6	25 June 1941	07:45	Potez 63		17	13 July 1941	11:12	DB-3	
7	29 June 1941	17:40	PZL.37		18	13 July 1941	11:13	DB-3	
8	30 June 1941	12:10	TsKB-19? (Note: According to Mathews and Foreman a DB-3.)	10 km (6.2 mi) east of Ostroh	19	14 July 1941	07:05	I-16	
9	30 June 1941	12:15	TsKB-19?	10 km (6.2 mi) east of Ostroh	20	2 August 1941	17:25	TsKB-19?	
10	1 July 1941	14:20	V-11 (Il-2)	east of Rivne	21	11 August 1941	12:04	SB-3	
11	10 July 1941	17:00	I-15		22	11 August 1941	12:05	SB-3	
12	10 July 1941	17:05	V-11 (Il-2)		23	11 August 1941	12:06	SB-3	
13	11 July 1941	15:50	I-16	40 km (25 mi) southeast of Makariv	24	20 August 1941	16:42	DB-3	
14	11 July 1941	15:52	I-16	40 km (25 mi) southeast of Makariv	25? (Note: This claim is not listed by Prien, Stemmer, Rodeike, and Bock.)	18 September 1941	14:40	R-5	
15	12 July 1941	10:25	DB-3						
– 9. Staffel of Jagdgeschwader 3 "Udet" – Eastern Front — 10 February – 14 April 1942
26	15 February 1942	10:55	R-5		35	17 March 1942	10:30	I-301 (LaGG-3)	
27	18 February 1942	14:50	I-61 (MiG-3)		36	17 March 1942	14:05	I-301 (LaGG-3)	
28	19 February 1942	10:00	Pe-2		37	20 March 1942	11:55? (Note: According to Mathews and Foreman claimed at 13:15.)	I-301 (LaGG-3)	
29	3 March 1942	10:20	U-2		38?	22 March 1942	11:55	Il-2	
30	7 March 1942	09:50	I-61 (MiG-3)		39	22 March 1942	13:15	Il-2	
31	7 March 1942	15:10	I-61 (MiG-3)		40	28 March 1942	12:10	I-61 (MiG-3)	
32	13 March 1942	11:35	R-10 (Seversky)		41	28 March 1942	16:25	I-61 (MiG-3)	
33	15 March 1942	16:15	I-301 (LaGG-3)		42	1 April 1942	10:30	I-61 (MiG-3)	
34	16 March 1942	10:00	I-301 (LaGG-3)		43	1 April 1942	15:12	Il-2	10 km (6.2 mi) southeast of Staraya Russa
– 9. Staffel of Jagdgeschwader 3 "Udet" – Eastern Front — 19 May – July 1942
44	19 May 1942	10:03	DB-3		59	30 June 1942	06:52	Il-2	south of Kshen
45	20 May 1942	04:55	I-61 (MiG-3)		60	30 June 1942	06:53	Il-2	east of Kshen
46	20 May 1942	09:30	I-61 (MiG-3)		61	1 July 1942	19:11	Il-2	north of Kshen
47	20 May 1942	11:55	Il-2	20 km (12 mi) northeast of Kharkov	62	9 July 1942	11:15	Il-2	Voronezh
48	21 May 1942	17:25	I-61 (MiG-3)		63	9 July 1942	11:16	Il-2	Voronezh
—	21 May 1942	—	I-61 (MiG-3)		64	10 July 1942	04:00	MiG-1	Voronezh
49	22 May 1942	09:40	I-61 (MiG-3)	20 km (12 mi) east of Stary Saltov	65	10 July 1942	04:10	MiG-1	Voronezh
50	22 May 1942	17:00	Il-2		66	14 July 1942	07:55	MiG-1	Millerovo
51	23 May 1942	05:25	Il-2	30 km (19 mi) east of Ternowaja	67	16 July 1942	18:16	P-40	Tischkina
52	26 May 1942	18:55	Il-2	15 km (9.3 mi) east of Balakliia	68	16 July 1942	18:35	P-40	Ignatow
53	27 May 1942	15:50	Pe-2	20 km (12 mi) southeast of Balakliia	69	22 July 1942	05:55	LaGG-3	Korskaja
54	27 May 1942	16:00	MiG-1	5 km (3.1 mi) southeast of Savyntsi	70	22 July 1942	05:58	LaGG-3	Korskaja
55	27 May 1942	16:02	MiG-1	5 km (3.1 mi) southeast of Savyntsi	71	24 July 1942	10:50	Il-2	southeast of Popow
56	10 June 1942	12:50	Il-2		72	24 July 1942	10:52	Il-2	southeast of Popow
57	14 June 1942	14:15	LaGG-3		73	24 July 1942	10:54	Il-2	southeast of Popow
58	30 June 1942	06:50	Il-2		74	25 July 1942	10:51	Hurricane	southeast of Kalach
– Stab II. Gruppe of Jagdgeschwader 3 "Udet" – Eastern Front — December 1942 – 3 February 1943
75	2 December 1942	10:03	Il-2	PQ 4932 south of Borodajewka	79	8 December 1942	10:15	P-40	PQ 3937
76	2 December 1942	10:10	MiG 3	PQ 4933 south of Borodajewka	80	11 December 1942	13:50	LaGG-3	3 km (1.9 mi) north of Chir train station
77	8 December 1942	09:57	P-40	PQ 3959	81	12 December 1942	10:26	LaGG-3	PQ 2943
78	8 December 1942	10:03? (Note: According to Mathews and Foreman claimed at 10:30.)	P-40	PQ 3935					
– 7. Staffel of Jagdgeschwader 3 "Udet" – Eastern Front — 4 February – 31 May 1943
82	11 February 1943	12:30	Boston	3 km (1.9 mi) northeast of Artemivsk	86	22 April 1943	17:10	Il-2 m.H. (Note: The "m.H." refers to an Ilyushin Il-2 with rear gunner (mit Heckschütze).)	
83	24 February 1943	14:50	LaGG-3	2 km (1.2 mi) west of Krischtepovka	87	22 April 1943	17:45	La-5	
84	5 April 1943	08:05	LaGG-3	5 km (3.1 mi) north of Izium	88	24 April 1943	09:05	R-5	south of Pesski
85	22 April 1943	17:05	Il-2 m.H.						

=== Awards ===
- Iron Cross (1939) 2nd and 1st Class
- Knight's Cross of the Iron Cross on 3 May 1942 as Oberfeldwebel and pilot in the 7./Jagdgeschwader 3 "Udet" (Note: According to Scherzer as pilot in the 9./Jagdgeschwader 3 "Udet".)
- German Cross in Gold on 12 July 1943 as Oberleutnant in the III./Jagdgeschwader 3
