= Herbert Kutscha =

German World War II flying ace (1917–2003)

- Born: 24 April 1917; Ratibor, Kingdom of Prussia
- Died: 19 September 2003 (aged 86); Kempten, Germany
- Military career
- Allegiance: Nazi Germany
- Branch: Luftwaffe
- Service years: 1939–1945
- Rank: Hauptmann (captain)
- Units: JG 77, ZG 1, JG 3, JG 27, JG 11
- Commands: 12./JG 27
- Conflicts: See battles World War II: Eastern Front; Western Front; Battle of France; Battle of Britain; Operation Barbarossa; Battle of Sicily; Invasion of Normandy; Battle of the Bulge; Defence of the Reich
- Awards: Knight's Cross of the Iron Cross

Herbert Kutscha (24 April 1917 – 19 September 2003 ) was a German Luftwaffe fighter ace and recipient of the Knight's Cross of the Iron Cross during World War II. The Knight's Cross of the Iron Cross, and its variants were the highest awards in the military and paramilitary forces of Nazi Germany during World War II. He was one of few Luftwaffe pilots to survive the whole war, serving from 1939 until 1945. During his career he was credited with 47 aerial victories in more than 900 missions.

== Career ==
Kutscha was born on 24 April 1917 in Ratibor, present-day Racibórz in southern Poland, at the time in the Province of Silesia of the Kingdom of Prussia. He began his military career as an Unteroffizier within 5. Staffel of Jagdgeschwader 77 (JG 77—77th Fighter Wing). He claimed his first victory during the "Phoney War" by shooting down a Royal Air Force (RAF) Vickers Wellington bomber on 14 December 1939. The bombers from No. 99 Squadron were on a mission to attack the Kriegsmarine cruisers Nürnberg and Leipzig which were returning to port after they were hit by torpedoes fired from the Royal Navy submarine HMS Salmon the day before. This was followed by a Lockheed Hudson on 24 February 1940. In March 1940, Kutscha was transferred to 5./Zerstörergeschwader 1. With this unit he took part in the campaign in the West. This unit was changed to 8./ZG 1 on 26 June 1940. With this unit he participated in Battle of Britain. The unit was finally transformed on 24 April 1941 to Schnellkampfgeschwader 210. With this unit Kutscha entered the war on the Eastern Front and received the German Cross in Gold (Deutsches Kreuz in Gold) on 14 February 1942 and Knight's Cross of the Iron Cross (Ritterkreuz des Eisernen Kreuzes) on 24 September 1942.

=== With Jagdgeschwader 3 "Udet" ===
In 1943, the Luftwaffe planned to expand the authorized strength of every Jagdgeschwader from three to four Gruppen. On 1 June 1943, Jagdgeschwader 3 "Udet" (JG 3—3rd Fighter Wing) was among the first units expanded. At Neubiberg Airfield near Munich, IV. Gruppe of JG 3, under the command of Hauptmann Franz Beyer, was created by spawning elements of I., II. and III. Gruppe of JG 3. The three Staffeln of IV. Gruppe were headed by Oberleutnant Franz Daspelgruber, as commander of 10. Staffel, Oberleutnant Gustav Frielinghaus, commanding 11. Staffel, and Kutscha, who was given command of 12. Staffel. The Gruppe was equipped with the Messerschmitt Bf 109 G-6 and was sent to southern Italy to fight in the Mediterranean front. In early July 1943, all elements of IV. Gruppe were based at Lecce Airfield until they were transferred to Sicily on 11 July.

=== Defense of the Reich ===
On 24 September, IV. Gruppe was ordered back to Germany, where the unit was initially based at Neubiberg Airfield again. The increasing success of the Allied Combined Bomber Offensive had forced the Oberkommando der Luftwaffe (OKL—High Command of the Air Force) to relocate its forces. In total, five Gruppen were withdrawn from other theaters of operations and redeployed to Defense of the Reich in August and September 1943. At Neubiberg, the Gruppe received a new complement of Bf 109 G-6 aircraft while the pilots were trained in formation flying and tactics in fighting the combat box, a tactical formation used by heavy bombers of the United States Army Air Forces (USAAF). On 18 December, the Gruppe was ordered to Grimbergen. Before this order was executed, on 19 December, the Fifteenth Air Force attacked railroading targets at Innsbruck and the Messerschmitt factories at Augsburg. Defending against this attack, Kutscha claimed the destruction of a B-24 bomber.

On 24 February 1944, during Big Week, Kutscha was shot down in his Bf 109 G-6 (Werknummer 411048—factory number) by a Republic P-47 Thunderbolt in aerial combat near Quakenbrück. The following day, Hauptmann Eberhard von Boremski succeeded Kutscha as command of 12. Staffel. In July 1944, he returned to the front in Normandy and succeeded Leutnant Franz Ruhl as Staffelkapitän of 4. Staffel of JG 3, a squadron of II. Gruppe. Ruhl was hospitalized due to physical and mental exhaustion. On 20 July, Kutscha became Gruppenkommandeur (group commander) of II. Gruppe of JG 3, succeeding Hauptmann Hans-Ekkehard Bob in this command position. Command of 4. Staffel returned to Ruhl after his return from the hospital. On 25 November 1944, II. Gruppe was detached from JG 3. The Gruppe was converted to fly the Messerschmitt Me 262 "Stormbird" jet fighter and became the I. Gruppe of Jagdgeschwader 7 (JG 7—7th Fighter Wing), the first operational jet fighter wing.

=== With Jagdgeschwader 27 and 11 ===
Kutscha did not convert to the Me 262, he was transferred to Jagdgeschwader 27 (JG 27—27th Fighter Wing) and appointed Staffelkapitän of the 15. Staffel of JG 27 on 14 December 1944. He replaced Hauptmann Ernst Laube who was transferred. On 17 December 1944, Hauptmann Fritz Keller, the Gruppenkommandeur of II. Gruppe of JG 27, was shot down and wounded in combat. In consequence, Kutscha was transferred and tasked with the leadership of II. Gruppe. On 25 December 1944, during the Ardennes offensive, Kutscha claimed two North American P-51 Mustang fighters shot down west of the Nürburgring. The mission was to provide ground support for German troops fighting around St. Vith. Kutscha led his fighters from Hopsten to the Schnee Eifel area where they were intercepted by USAAF fighters returning from a fighter escort mission near Adenau and the Nürburgring. In this encounter, German fighters claimed four aerial victories for the loss of eight Bf 109s. Kutscha was shot down and slightly wounded 30 kilometres (19 miles) west of Bad Neuenahr in his Bf 109 G-10 (Werknummer 490664). His victor may have been Captain Bertrum Edwin Ellingson from the 356th Fighter Group.

On 23 February 1945, he was appointed Gruppenkommandeur of the III. Gruppe of Jagdgeschwader 11 (JG 11—11th Fighter Wing), succeeding Oberleutnant Paul-Heinrich Dähne, who was transferred.

Kutscha flew more than 900 missions. He was credited with 47 victories in air combat—44 of which were on the Western Front (at least six were four-engine bombers)—plus at least 44 aircraft destroyed on the ground. He successfully targeted dozens of different objectives, including 41 tanks, 15 locomotives, 11 artillery positions, and 157 vehicles. Kutscha died 19 September 2003 in Kempten at the age of 86.

== Summary of career ==
=== Aerial victory claims ===
According to Obermaier, Kutscha was credited with 47 aerial victories claimed in over 900 combat missions. This figure includes 18 claims on the Eastern Front, and 29 on the Western Front, including six four-engine bombers. Mathews and Foreman, authors of Luftwaffe Aces — Biographies and Victory Claims, researched the German Federal Archives and state that he claimed at least 39 aerial victories, potentially 45 claims. He claimed approximately 18 aerial victories on the Eastern Front, and 21 on the Western Front which includes six four-engine bombers.

Victory claims were logged to a map-reference (PQ = Planquadrat), for example "PQ 14 Ost 51331". The Luftwaffe grid map (Jägermeldenetz) covered all of Europe, western Russia and North Africa and was composed of rectangles measuring 15 minutes of latitude by 30 minutes of longitude, an area of about 360 square miles (930 km^{2}). These sectors were then subdivided into 36 smaller units to give a location area 3 km × 4 km (1.9 mi × 2.5 mi) in size.

Chronicle of aerial victories
This along with the * (asterisk) indicates an Herausschuss (separation shot)—a severely damaged heavy bomber forced to separate from his combat box which was counted as an aerial victory. This and the ? (question mark) indicates information discrepancies listed by Cull, Prien, Stemmer, Rodeike, Bock, Mathews and Foreman.
Claim	Date	Time	Type	Location	Claim	Date	Time	Type	Location
– 5. Staffel of Jagdgeschwader 77 – "Phoney War" — 1 September 1939 – 6 April 1940
1	14 December 1939	15:50	Wellington	north of Wangerooge	2? (Note: According to Mathews and Foreman, this claim is unconfirmed.)	24 February 1940	09:11	Hudson	40 km (25 mi) north of Ameland
– 5. Staffel of Zerstörergeschwader 1 – Battle of France — May 1940
	10 May 1940	—	Douglas	vicinity of Ypenburg		10 May 1940	—	Douglas	vicinity of Ypenburg
– 8. Staffel of Zerstörergeschwader 76 – Battle of France — June 1940
	4 June 1940? (Note: According to Mathews and Foreman, claimed on 8 June 1940.)	—	Bf 109	vicinity of Boécourt					
– 5. Staffel of Schnellkampfgeschwader 210 – Operation Barbarossa — 22 June – 5 December 1941
	30 June 1941	04:15	I-15	Buschow airfield		6 October 1941	07:50	R-5	
	26 July 1941	19:45	MiG-1	Roslavl					
– 6. Staffel of Zerstörergeschwader 1 – Eastern Front — June – July 1942
	30 June 1942	15:10	Il-2			26 July 1942	16:21	I-153	
– II. Gruppe of Zerstörergeschwader 1 – Eastern Front — August 1942
	9 August 1942	15:52	I-153		23	30 August 1942	13:22	I-16	
– 12. Staffel of Jagdgeschwader 3 "Udet" – Mediterranean Theater — 1 July – 28 September 1943
25	12 July 1943	11:12	Spitfire	30 km (19 mi) south of Licata	29	25 August 1943	10:50	B-17	PQ 14 Ost 51331 vicinity of Naples
26	16 August 1943	12:51	B-24	5 km (3.1 mi) south of San Matteo	30	28 August 1943	15:55	P-38	PQ 14 Ost 31223
27	19 August 1943	12:37	B-17	south of Punta Licosa	31	30 August 1943	12:20	P-38	PQ 14 Ost 31273 vicinity of Ischia
28	20 August 1943	13:28	P-38	PQ 14 Ost 41273	32	9 September 1943	13:55	B-24	PQ 14 Ost 5138 vicinity of Calabria
– 12. Staffel of Jagdgeschwader 3 "Udet" – Defense of the Reich — October 1943 – 24 February 1944
33	19 December 1943	11:52	B-24	southeast of Innsbruck	35?	10 February 1944	11:00	B-17	Zwolle/Hardenberg
34	31 January 1944	15:20	P-38		36	21 February 1944	14:35	B-17*	vicinity of Holzminden
– 15. Staffel of Jagdgeschwader 27 – Defense of the Reich — 15–17 December 1944
39	17 December 1944	11:02	P-47	east of Malmedy					
– Stab II. Gruppe of Jagdgeschwader 27 – Defense of the Reich — 17 December 1944 – 20 January 1945
40	25 December 1944	11:57	P-51	west of Nürburgring	41	25 December 1944	12:00	P-51	west of Nürburgring

=== Awards ===
- Iron Cross (1939)
  - 2nd Class
  - 1st Class
- Front Flying Clasp of the Luftwaffe in Gold with Pennant "500"
- Wound Badge in Black (25 December 1944)
- Honour Goblet of the Luftwaffe on 3 November 1941 as Oberfeldwebel and pilot
- German Cross in Gold on 14 February 1942 as Oberfeldwebel in the 5./Kampfgeschwader 210 (S)
- Knight's Cross of the Iron Cross on 24 September 1942 as Leutnant of the Reserves and pilot in the II./Schnellkampfgeschwader 210 (Note: According to Scherzer as Leutnant (war officer) and pilot in the 6./Zerstörergeschwader 1.)
