= Lothar Keller =

German World War II flying ace (1914–1941)

- Keller as a Hauptmann
- Born: 7 April 1914; Dresden
- Died: 26 June 1941 (aged 27); Stoyaniv, 15 km (9.3 mi) southwest of Horokhiv
- Military career
- Allegiance: Nazi Germany
- Branch: Luftwaffe
- Service years: 1936–1941
- Rank: Hauptmann (captain)
- Units: Condor Legion; JG 3
- Commands: 1./JG 3, I./JG 3, II./JG 3
- Conflicts: Spanish Civil War World War II: Battle of France; Battle of Britain; Operation Barbarossa
- Awards: Spanish Cross in Gold with Swords Knight's Cross of the Iron Cross

Lothar Arthur Gerhard Keller (7 April 1914 – 26 June 1941) was a Luftwaffe ace and recipient of the Knight's Cross of the Iron Cross during World War II. The Knight's Cross of the Iron Cross, and its variants were the highest awards in the military and paramilitary forces of Nazi Germany during World War II. During his career he was credited with 23 victories, 16 on the Western Front, four on the Eastern Front and three during the Spanish Civil War. On 26 June 1941, Keller was killed in a mid-air collision. He was posthumously awarded the Knight's Cross on 9 July 1941.

== Early life and career ==
Keller was born on 7 April 1914 in the Stadtbezirk Plauen of Dresden, at the time in the Kingdom of Saxony within the German Empire. He joined the military service of the Luftwaffe in 1936 and was trained as a fighter pilot. (Note: Flight training in the Luftwaffe progressed through the levels A1, A2 and B1, B2, referred to as A/B flight training. A training included theoretical and practical training in aerobatics, navigation, long-distance flights and dead-stick landings. The B courses included high-altitude flights, instrument flights, night landings and training to handle the aircraft in difficult situations.) In June 1938, Keller joined the Condor Legion, supporting Franco's Nationalists in the Spanish Civil War.

In Spain, Keller was assigned to 1. Staffel (1st squadron) of Jagdgruppe 88 (J/88—88th Fighter Group) under the command of Oberleutnant Wolfgang Schellmann, and claimed three aerial victories. For his accomplishments in Spain, Keller was awarded the Spanish Cross in Gold with Swords (Spanienkreuz in Gold mit Schwertern) on 14 April 1939. In Spain, Keller flew strafing attacks against retreating Republicans.

Following his return to Germany, Keller was assigned to 4. Staffel of Jagdgeschwader 137 (JG 137—137th Fighter Wing). The Staffel was commanded by Oberleutnant Werner Andres and subordinated to II.(leichte) Gruppe (2nd light group) of JG 137 headed by Major Otto-Heinrich von Houwald. Formed on 1 July 1938, the Gruppe was initially based at Zerbst and equipped with the Arado Ar 68. A few weeks later, they received a full complement of the Messerschmitt Bf 109 D-1 which was then upgraded to the Bf 109 E in early 1939. On 1 November 1938, II.(l)/JG 137 was redesignated and became the II. Gruppe of Jagdgeschwader 231 (JG 231—231st Fighter Wing). On 1 May 1939, II./JG 231 received its final designation and became I. Gruppe of Jagdgeschwader 3 (JG 3—3rd Fighter Wing). In consequence, 4. Staffel was also renamed and became 1. Staffel of JG 3. On 26 August 1936 during mobilization, I. Gruppe was ordered to Brandis.

== World War II ==
World War II in Europe began on Friday 1 September 1939 when German forces invaded Poland. On 3 September, I. Gruppe of JG 3 relocated to Schafstädt, now part of Bad Lauchstädt, where they stayed until 22 September. Here the Gruppe was tasked with protecting the Central German industrial areas. On 10 January 1940, the Gruppe was ordered to an airfield at Peppenhoven, located approximately 20 kilometers (12 miles) northwest of Remagen. Here on 1 February, Keller was appointed Staffelkapitän (squadron leader) of 1. Staffel of JG 3. He replaced his former commanding officer, Werner Andres, who was transferred. Command of I. Gruppe had also changed, Hauptmann Günther Lützow had succeeded Houwald who had been transferred.

=== Battle of France and Britain ===
On 10 May 1940, the Wehrmacht began its offensive Operation Case Yellow (Fall Gelb), the invasion of France and the neutral Low Countries. I. Gruppe of JG 3 participated in the offensive as a subordinated unit of Jagdgeschwader 77 (JG 77—77th Fighter Wing). During the Battle of France, JG 77 was under control of I. Fliegerkorps (1st Air Corps), which formed the right wing of Luftflotte 3 (3rd Air Fleet) in Belgium and the Netherlands.

Following the Battle of France, I. Gruppe returned to Germany on 24 June, arriving at Wiesbaden-Erbenheim Airfield that evening. With ten aerial victories claimed at the time, Keller was leading fighter pilot of I. Gruppe, one more than Lützow. The pilots were then sent on leave. By then, Keller had been awarded both classes of the Iron Cross (Eisernes Kreuz).

By 3 July 1940, the majority of the Bf 109s had returned to Grandvilliers at the English Channel from maintenance overhaul. I. Gruppe flew its first missions over the Channel Coast on the evening of 5 July 1940. In the following days flight operations were impeded by a period of bad weather. On 1 August 1940, I. Gruppe was moved to Colembert, the Geschwaderstab (headquarters unit) and the other two Gruppen were moved to airfields in the vicinity of Boulogne. In preparations for actions against Great Britain, JG 3 was put under the control of Luftflotte 2 (2nd Air Fleet), thus placing it under the command of Jagdfliegerführer 2 Oberst (Colonel) Theo Osterkamp. On 18 August, Keller claimed his first aerial victory over the Royal Air Force (RAF) during the Battle of Britain. On a combat air patrol, the Luftwaffe fighters encountered a flight of RAF fighters. In this engagement, Keller claimed a Hawker Hurricane fighter shot down.

When on 21 August Lützow was appointed Geschwaderkommodore (wing commander) of JG 3, Keller was temporarily given command of I. Gruppe. He briefly held this position until 27 August when Hauptmann Hans von Hahn officially took command. Lützow transferred command to Keller on 25 August. The next day, I. Gruppe escorted bombers from Kampfgeschwader 3 (KG 3—3rd Bomber Wing) on their mission to Canterbury. On this mission, Keller claimed a Hurricane fighter shot down. In aerial combat over sea on 5 September, Keller's Bf 109 E-1 (Werknummer 3882—factory number) sustained damage, resulting in an emergency landing near Calais. One day less than a week later on 11 September, Keller had a mid-air collision in his Bf 109 E-4 (Werknummer 5276) with another Bf 109 flown by Oberfeldwebel Franz Hessel. He managed to bail out unhurt over sea and was rescued by the Seenotdienst (sea rescue service).

On 24 November 1940, Keller was appointed Gruppenkommandeur (group commander) of II. Gruppe of JG 3 which was based at Arques. He succeeded Hauptmann Erich Woitke who was transferred. As a result, command of 1. Staffel was given to Oberleutnant Gerhard Sprenger. On 10 February 1941, the RAF flew a "Circus" operation into the Pas de Calais area. Defending against two formations of ten Bristol Blenheim bombers and their fighter escort, Keller claimed his 16th aerial victory. Five days later, II. Gruppe was withdrawn from combat operations and ordered to Darmstadt-Griesheim Airfield.

=== War against the Soviet Union and death ===
In preparation for Operation Barbarossa, the German invasion of the Soviet Union, II. Gruppe headed further east on 18 June. Following a stopover at Kraków, the unit was moved to Hostynne. At the start of the campaign, JG 3 under the command of Major (Major) Günther Lützow was subordinated to the 5th Air Corps, under the command of General der Flieger (General of the Aviators) Robert Ritter von Greim, itself part of Luftflotte 4 (4th Air Fleet), under the command of Generaloberst (Colonel General) Alexander Löhr. These air elements supported Generalfeldmarschall (Field Marshal) Gerd von Rundstedt's Army Group South, with the objective of capturing Ukraine and its capital Kiev. At 17:00 on 21 June 1941, the 5th Air Corps, based at Lipsko, briefed the various unit commanders of the upcoming attack. (Note: All times used in this section are Central European Time unless otherwise noted.) That evening, Keller informed his subordinates of the attack. On 22 June, the first day of the invasion, Keller claimed four aerial victories in vicinity of Dubno, two Polikarpov I-153 and two Polikarpov I-16 fighters each.

On 26 June, II. Gruppe relocated from Hostynne to Volodymyr, formerly known as Włodzimierz. That day, Keller was killed in a mid-air collision with another Luftwaffe aircraft during aerial combat. His Bf 109 F crashed west of Stoyaniv, located approximately 15 kilometers (9.3 miles) southwest of Horokhiv. In consequence, command of II. Gruppe was passed on to Hauptmann Gordon Gollob. Alternatively, Botho Teichmann stated that Keller was flying a Fieseler Fi 156 Storch on an aerial reconnaissance mission that day. However, JG 3 did not report the loss of a Fi 156 that day. Posthumously on 9 July, Keller was awarded the Knight's Cross of the Iron Cross (Ritterkreuz des Eisernen Kreuzes) for 20 aerial victories claimed during World War II. He was the first pilot of JG 3 to receive this distinction posthumously.

== Summary of career ==
=== Aerial victory claims ===
Mathews and Foreman, authors of Luftwaffe Aces — Biographies and Victory Claims, researched the German Federal Archives and found documentation for 23 aerial victory claims. This number includes three claims during the Spanish Civil War, 16 on the Western Front, and four on the Eastern Front.

Chronicle of aerial victories
Claim	Date	Time	Type	Location	Claim	Date	Time	Type	Location
Spanish Civil War
– 1. Staffel of Jagdgruppe 88 – Spanish Civil War — August – October 1938
1	13 June 1938	—	I-15		3	19 August 1938	—	I-16	
2	15 July 1938	—	I-15						
World War II
– 1. Staffel of Jagdgeschwader 3 – Battle of France — 10 May – 25 June 1940
1	14 May 1940	—	M.S.406	northwest of Dinant	6	21 May 1940	—	M.S.406	Cambrai
2	17 May 1940	12:30	Curtiss	south of Saint-Quentin	7	23 May 1940	14:10	Spitfire	Béthune
3	17 May 1940	12:30	Curtiss	south of Saint-Quentin	8	31 May 1940	19:35	M.S.406	south of Amiens
4	19 May 1940	16:40	Spitfire	Philippeville	9	10 June 1940	09:35	C.710	Dreux
5	21 May 1940	—	M.S.406	Cambrai	10	10 June 1940	09:37	C.710	Dreux
– 1. Staffel of Jagdgeschwader 3 – Battle of Britain — 26 June – 24 November 1940
11	18 August 1940	—	Hurricane		14	7 September 1940	—	M.S.406	Rochester
12	26 August 1940	—	Hurricane	Thames Estuary	15	15 September 1940	—	Spitfire	vicinity of London
13	31 August 1940	—	Spitfire	east of London					
– II. Gruppe of Jagdgeschwader 3 – Battle of Britain — 24 November 1940 – 8 June 1941
16	10 February 1941	17:42	Hurricane	east of Dover					
– II. Gruppe of Jagdgeschwader 3 – Operation Barbarossa — 22–26 June 1941
17	22 June 1941	07:28	I-16	vicinity of Dubno	19	22 June 1941	18:42	I-153	vicinity of Dubno
18	22 June 1941	07:44	I-153	vicinity of Dubno	20	22 June 1941	18:50	I-16	vicinity of Dubno

=== Awards ===
- Spanish Cross in Gold with Swords (14 April 1939)
- Iron Cross (1939) 2nd and 1st Class
- Knight's Cross of the Iron Cross on 9 July 1941 as Hauptmann and Gruppenkommandeur of the II./Jagdgeschwader 3

== Notes ==
Military offices
Preceded by Hauptmann Günther Lützow	Commander of I. Gruppe of Jagdgeschwader 3; 24 August 1940 – 27 August 1940	Succeeded by Hauptmann Hans von Hahn
Preceded by Hauptmann Erich Woitke	Commander of II. Gruppe of Jagdgeschwader 3; 24 November 1940 – 26 June 1941	Succeeded by Hauptmann Gordon Gollob
