= Hans-Ekkehard Bob =

German World War II fighter pilot (1917–2013)

- Born: 24 January 1917; Freiburg, Breisgau
- Died: 12 August 2013 (aged 96); Freiburg, Baden-Württemberg, Germany
- Relatives: Elmar Bob (son)
- Military career
- Allegiance: Nazi Germany
- Branch: Luftwaffe
- Service years: 1936–1945
- Rank: Major
- Units: JG 54, JG 51, JG 3, EJG 2, JV 44
- Commands: IV./JG 51, II./JG 3, II./EJG 2
- Conflicts: World War II
- Awards: Knight's Cross of the Iron Cross
- Other work: Founder and Chairman of Bohrmaschinen und Geräte GmbH (drilling equipment)

Hans Ekkehard Bob (24 January 1917 – 12 August 2013) was a German fighter pilot, serving with the Luftwaffe. During World War II, Bob flew approximately 700 combat missions, and claimed 60 victories; 37 of which were on the Eastern Front.

== Early Luftwaffe ==
Bob joined the Luftwaffe in 1936, at the rank of a Fahnenjunker (officer candidate), and began his flight training in June 1937.

== World War II ==
On 22 June 1940, I. Gruppe of Jagdgeschwader 21 (JG 21–21st Fighter Wing) was withdrawn from France and moved to München Gladbach, present-day Mönchengladbach. The following day the Gruppe was ordered to Soesterberg in the Netherlands. On 2 July, the unit moved to Bergen op Zoom. Three days later I. Gruppe of JG 21 was renamed and became the III. Gruppe of Jagdgeschwader 54 (JG 54–54th Fighter Wing).

On 5 September, Bob was temporarily appointed Staffelkapitän (squadron leader) of 7. Staffel of JG 54, replacing Oberleutnant Günther Scholz. Scholz was temporarily transferred to the Gruppenstab (headquarters unit) of III. Gruppe of JG 54. There, Scholz succeeded Hauptmann Fritz Ultsch who had been killed in action. On 15 September, also known as the Battle of Britain Day, Bob's Messerschmitt Bf 109 was hit by cannon shell in the radiator while flying over Canterbury at an altitude of 12,000 feet (3,700 meters). Fearing that his engine would overheat, he nursed his Bf 109 back to France by periodically turning his engine off, trading altitude for distance, thus cooling the engine before restarting it to gain altitude again. By November 1940, Bob had claimed his 19th aerial victory, and was awarded the Knight's Cross of the Iron Cross (Ritterkreuz des Eisernen Kreuzes) on 7 March 1941. On 21 March, Bob made a forced landing in the sea off of Cherbourg due to engine failure of the Bücker Bü 131 Jungmann D-2 (Werknummer 4506—factory number) trainer. On 29 March, the Gruppe was ordered to Graz-Thalerhof in preparation for the Balkans campaign.

On 20 April, III. Gruppe was withdrawn from combat operation, relocating to Belgrad-Semlin. On 4 May, the Gruppe began its transfer to Airfield Stolp-Reitz in Pomerania, present-day Słupsk, by train, arriving at Stolp-Reitz on 10 May.

=== Operation Barbarossa ===
At Stolp-Reitz, JG 54 upgraded their aircraft to the Bf 109 F-2. For the next four weeks, the pilots familiarized themselves with the new aircraft before on 15 June, III. Gruppe was ordered to Blumenfeld in East Prussia, present-day Karczarningken in the Kaliningrad Oblast, in preparation for Operation Barbarossa, the invasion of the Soviet Union. During the upcoming invasion, JG 54 would be deployed in the area of Army Group North, was subordinated to I. Fliegerkorps (1st Air Corps) and supported the 16th and 18th Army as well as the Panzer Group 4 in their strategic objective to reach Leningrad.

=== Defense of the Reich ===
In mid-February 1943, III. Gruppe of JG 54 was withdrawn from the Eastern Front and ordered to Vendeville, France where it was subordinated to the Geschwaderstab (headquarters unit) of Jagdgeschwader 26 "Schlageter" (JG 26—26th Fighter Wing). The Gruppe was equipped with the Messerschmitt Bf 109 G-4 armed with 20 mm MG 151/20 cannons installed in conformal gun pods under the wings. The original plan was to exchange JG 26 which had been fighting on the Western Front with JG 54. The plan was cancelled in March. Instead of III. Gruppe of JG 54 returning to the Eastern Front, the Gruppe was ordered to Bad Zwischenahn on 25 March and then to Oldenburg Airfield two days later. Here, the Gruppe was subordinated to the 2. Jagd-Division (2nd Fighter Division) which was fighting in defense of the Reich.

On 17 April, Bob had a mid-air collision with a Boeing B-17 Flying Fortress bomber southwest of Bremen. He successfully bailed out of his Bf 109 G-4 (Werknummer 14935) and landed safely. On 1 August, Bob was appointed Gruppenkommandeur (group commander) of IV. Gruppe of Jagdgeschwader 51 "Mölders" (JG 51–51st Fighter Wing). He replaced Major Rudolf Resch who had been killed in action on 11 July. At the time. IV. Gruppe was fighting in the Battle of Kursk on the Eastern Front.

On 8 May 1944, Bob was transferred to the Stab (headquarters unit) of Jagdgeschwader 3 "Udet" (JG 3–3rd Fighter Wing), named after the World War I fighter ace Ernst Udet Command of his IV. Gruppe of JG 51 was passed to Major Heinz Lange. When on 29 May 1944, the wing commander JG 3, Major Friedrich-Karl Müller was killed in action, Bob was temporarily placed in command of JG 3 until the official successor, Major Heinz Bär, took command on 9 June. Bob was then given command of II. Gruppe of JG 3, replacing Hauptmann Gustav Frielinghaus in this capacity.

== Summary of career ==
=== Aerial victory claims ===
According to US historian David T. Zabecki, Bob was credited with 60 aerial victories. Mathews and Foreman, authors of Luftwaffe Aces — Biographies and Victory Claims, researched the German Federal Archives and found records for 57 aerial victory claims, plus four further unconfirmed claims. This figure includes 37 aerial victories on the Eastern Front and another 20 on the Western Front, including one heavy bomber.

Victory claims were logged to a map-reference (PQ = Planquadrat), for example "PQ 10191". The Luftwaffe grid map (Jägermeldenetz) covered all of Europe, western Russia and North Africa and was composed of rectangles measuring 15 minutes of latitude by 30 minutes of longitude, an area of about 360 square miles (930 km^{2}). These sectors were then subdivided into 36 smaller units to give a location area 3 km × 4 km (1.9 mi × 2.5 mi) in size.

Chronicle of aerial victories
This and the – (dash) indicates unconfirmed aerial victory claims for which Bob did not receive credit. This and the ? (question mark) indicates information discrepancies listed by Prien, Stemmer, Rodeike, Bock, Mathews and Foreman.
Claim	Date	Time	Type	Location	Claim	Date	Time	Type	Location
– 3. Staffel of Jagdgeschwader 21 – Battle of France — 10 May – 25 June 1940
1	10 May 1940	10:33	Gladiator	Tongeren	3	25 May 1940	19:45	M.S.406	north of Cambrai; Péronne-en-Mélantois
2	24 May 1940	15:20	D.520	Hénin-Liétard	4	26 May 1940	09:10	Hawk 75	Cambrai
– 3. Staffel of Jagdgeschwader 21 – Action at the Channel and over England — 26 June – 4 July 1940
5	26 June 1940	18:10	Blenheim	60 km (37 mi) west of Rotterdam					
– 9. Staffel of Jagdgeschwader 54 – Action at the Channel and over England — 5 July – 4 September 1940
6	12 August 1940	18:33	Spitfire	Canterbury	10	31 August 1940	11:40	Hurricane	Eastchurch
7	15 August 1940	19:27	Spitfire	southeast of Dover	11	31 August 1940	11:42	Hurricane	Eastchurch
8	16 August 1940	13:13	Spitfire	Calais	12? (Note: According to Mathews and Foreman this claim is unconfirmed.)	4 September 1940	10:10	Hurricane	Folkestone
9	18 August 1940	14:40	Hurricane	10 km (6.2 mi) off Ramsgate	13?	9 September 1940	18:40	Spitfire	Tunbridge
– 7. Staffel of Jagdgeschwader 54 – Action at the Channel and over England — 5 September – October 1940
14	30 September 1940	14:35	Spitfire	Tunbridge	16	9 October 1940	16:38? (Note: According to Mathews and Foreman claimed at 16:58.)	Spitfire	Chatham
—	30 September 1940	—	Spitfire		17	20 October 1940	15:40	Spitfire	London
15	9 October 1940	14:00	Spitfire	Ashford					
– Stab III. Gruppe of Jagdgeschwader 54 – Action at the Channel and over England — October – November 1940
18	27 October 1940	10:30	Hurricane	10 km (6.2 mi) east of Tonbridge	19	11 November 1940	13:17	Spitfire	Margate
– 9. Staffel of Jagdgeschwader 54 – Balkan Campaign — 29 March – 3 May 1941
20	6 April 1941	17:30	Bf 109	Petrovgrad	21	7 April 1941	14:20	IK-2	Martinac
– 9. Staffel of Jagdgeschwader 54 – Operation Barbarossa — 22 June – 5 December 1941
22	23 June 1941	11:50	SB-2	Kėdainiai	31	24 July 1941	19:55	SB-2	Duo
23	30 June 1941	07:05	SB-3	Dünaburg; Kėdainiai	32	10 September 1941	14:50	I-18 (MiG-1)	Demyansk
24	30 June 1941	07:09	SB-3	Dünaburg	33	11 September 1941	09:45	I-18 (MiG-1)	Demyansk
25	30 June 1941	12:35	SB-3	Dünaburg	34	15 September 1941	15:15	DB-3	Krasnoye Selo
26	30 June 1941	15:10	DB-3? (Note: According to Mathews and Foreman claimed as a Tupolev SB-3.)	Dünaburg	35	15 September 1941	15:25	DB-3	Krasnoye Selo
27	6 July 1941	18:40	SB-3	southeast of Ostrov	36	21 September 1941	07:05	I-153	Krasnogvardeysk
28	6 July 1941	18:41	SB-3	southeast of Ostrov	37	7 October 1941	09:40	ground-attack aircraft	Krasny Bor
29	6 July 1941	18:45	SB-3	southeast of Ostrov	38	6 November 1941	10:37	ground-attack aircraft	Kolpino
30	15 July 1941	19:15	SB-3	Orly	39	1 December 1941	09:42	I-18 (MiG-1)	Mostowaja
– 9. Staffel of Jagdgeschwader 54 – Eastern Front — 6 December 1941 – 30 April 1942
40	25 April 1942	11:30	MiG-3	Leningrad					
– 9. Staffel of Jagdgeschwader 54 – Eastern Front — 1 May 1942 – 3 February 1943
41	28 August 1942	11:30	Il-2	PQ 10191, Kilosi	49	22 September 1942	05:35	MiG-3	PQ 10354, Beresowka
42	1 September 1942	09:26	LaGG-3	PQ 10191, Kilosi	50	29 September 1942	16:08	LaGG-3	PQ 00231, Neva-Bend
43	1 September 1942	12:10	LaGG-3	PQ 10153, Rabetschj	51	17 December 1942	10:51	Il-2	PQ 46131, Sychyovka
44	2 September 1942	13:50	Il-2	PQ 10183, Estonskij	52	17 December 1942	11:23	Il-2	PQ 47791, Sychyovka
45	2 September 1942	14:00	Il-2	PQ 10184, Gaitolowo east of Mga	53	29 December 1942	09:52	Il-2	PQ 07583, Koskino
46	10 September 1942	17:04	Il-2	PQ 10183, Tortolowo	54	30 December 1942	09:55	Il-2	PQ 07672, Velikiye Luki; 10 km (6.2 mi) southeast of Velikiye Luki
47	15 September 1942	06:02	LaGG-3	PQ 10113; Shlisselburg	55	30 December 1942	10:12	LaGG-3	PQ 07534, Velikiye Luki; 40 km (25 mi) north of Velikiye Luki
48	15 September 1942	15:20	LaGG-3	PQ 10113, Shlisselburg	56	14 January 1943	11:37	LaGG-3	PQ 07671, Velikiye Luki; 10 km (6.2 mi) southeast of Velikiye Luki
– 9. Staffel of Jagdgeschwader 54 – Western Front — 27 March – 1 August 1943
— ? (Note: This unconfirmed claim is not listed by Prien, Stemmer, Rodeike, Bock. However, the authors do list a mid-air collision with a Boeing B-17 Flying Fortress bomber southwest of Bremen on this day.)	17 April 1943	12:45	B-17	near Groß Köhren	57	27 July 1943	20:20	Spitfire	20 km (12 mi) west of Zandvoort
– Stab IV. Gruppe of Jagdgeschwader 51 "Mölders" – Eastern Front — 1 August – 31 December 1943
58	26 September 1943	16:37	Yak-1	south of Jantschetznok	59	27 September 1943	13:32	La-5	east-northeast of Ssusslowka

=== Awards ===
- Iron Cross (1939)
  - 2nd Class (17 September 1939)
  - 1st Class
- Honor Goblet of the Luftwaffe (28 September 1940)
- German Cross in Gold on 24 December 1942 as Oberleutnant in the 9./Jagdgeschwader 54
- Knight's Cross of the Iron Cross on 7 March 1941 as Oberleutnant and Staffelkapitän of the 9./Jagdgeschwader 54

== Publications ==
- Bob, Hans-Ekkehard (2003). Betrayed Ideals, Memoirs of a Luftwaffe Fighter Ace. Cerberus Publishing Ltd. ISBN 1-84145-031-6.
- Bob, Hans-Ekkehard (2011). Jagdgeschwader 54 — Die Piloten mit den grünen Herzen (in German). Aachen, Germany: Helios Verlags- und Buchvertriebsgesellschaft. ISBN 978-3-86933-041-9.
