= Franz Schwaiger =

- Born: 1 February 1918; Ulm, German Empire
- Died: 24 April 1944 (aged 26); Rain am Lech, Germany
- Cause of death: Killed in action
- Military career
- Allegiance: Nazi Germany
- Branch: Luftwaffe
- Service years: 1941–1944
- Rank: Leutnant (second lieutenant)
- Unit: JG 3
- Conflicts: World War II: Eastern Front; Defense of the Reich
- Awards: Knight's Cross of the Iron Cross

Franz Schwaiger (1 February 1918 – 24 April 1944) was a Luftwaffe ace and recipient of the Knight's Cross of the Iron Cross during World War II. The Knight's Cross of the Iron Cross, and its variants were the highest awards in the military and paramilitary forces of Nazi Germany during World War II - for the fighter pilots, it was a quantifiable measure of skill and success.

== Military career ==
Schwaiger was born on 1 February 1918 in Ulm in the Kingdom of Württemberg within the German Empire. Following flight training as a fighter pilot in the summer of 1941, (Note: Flight training in the Luftwaffe progressed through the levels A1, A2 and B1, B2, referred to as A/B flight training. A training included theoretical and practical training in aerobatics, navigation, long-distance flights and dead-stick landings. The B courses included high-altitude flights, instrument flights, night landings and training to handle the aircraft in difficult situations.) he was posted, as an Unteroffizier, to 6. Staffel of Jagdgeschwader 3 "Udet" (JG 3—3rd Fighter Wing). This squadron was part of II./JG 3 under the command of Gordon Gollob and fighting with Army Group South. Schwaiger quickly earned his first air victory, on 16.08.1941, but by the end of the year had reached a total of eight victories at which time his unit was rotated back to the Reich for rest and re-equipping.

A short secondment for his Gruppe to the Mediterranean Theatre, from January to April 1942, yielded no further success for Franz, but upon their return to the Eastern Front in May he started scoring steadily. Again covering Army Group South and the advance across Ukraine toward Stalingrad, he scored his 20th victory on 31 July. The next week he was transferred to 2./JG 3, in the same sector. He scored his 30th victory on 17 August, and his 40th on 29 September, between which he had been transferred again, this time to 3./JG 3. Promoted to Feldwebel in early October, he scored his 50th victory on the 9th. On 29 October, Schwaiger was awarded the Knight's Cross of the Iron Cross (Ritterkreuz des Eisernen Kreuzes) for 52 aerial victories claimed.

At the start of 1943 as the disaster at Stalingrad unfolded, and with 56 victories, Franz was sent for officer-training. Commissioned as a Leutnant, he returned to I./JG 3 as their highest-scoring pilot.

=== Defense of the Reich and death ===
In March 1943, I. Gruppe had assembled at Döberitz, located approximately 10 kilometers (6.2 miles) west of Staaken, for a period of rest, replenishment and preparation for defense of the Reich missions. In early April, the Gruppe was ordered to Mönchengladbach after it had received 37 factory new Messerschmitt Bf 109 G-4 fighter aircraft equipped with a pair of 20 mm MG 151/20 cannons installed in conformal gun pods under the wings. There, the pilots trained formation flying, operating in Staffel and Gruppen strength, required to combat the United States Army Air Forces (USAAF) heavy bomber formations. A few of the more experienced fighter pilots were sent to Brandenburg-Briest for additional training on Y-Control for fighters, a system to control groups of fighters intercepting USAAF bomber formations. In early May, the Gruppe had completed its training period and was subordinated to Stab of JG 3 which was under control of 3. Jagd-Division (3rd Fighter Division).

On 28 February 1944, I. Gruppe moved to Burg bei Magdeburg where the 1. Jagd-Division (1st Fighter Division) was concentrating fighter forces. In March, Schwaiger was appointed Staffelkapitän (squadron leader) of 1. Staffel of JG 3 following the death of its former commander Leutnant Hans Frese on 8 March. On 24 April, the USAAF Eighth Air Force sent 745 heavy bombers, escorted by 867 fighter aircraft, against the German aircraft industry. At 12:15, I. Gruppe took off and joined up with other elements of JG 3. At approximately 13:15, the Luftwaffe fighters intercepted a bomber formation north of Augsburg. The Luftwaffe fighters flew several attacks against the bomber formation. Following this engagement, Schwaiger made a successful forced landing in his Bf 109 G-5 (Werknummer 110186—factory number) near Neuburg an der Donau but was then killed by strafing North American P-51 Mustang fighters after he had left his aircraft. Command of 1. Staffel remained vacant until 10 May when Hauptmann Ernst Laube was appointed its Staffelkapitän.

== Summary of career ==
=== Aerial victory claims ===
According to US historian David T. Zabecki, Schwaiger was credited with 67 aerial victories. Mathews and Foreman, authors of Luftwaffe Aces — Biographies and Victory Claims, researched the German Federal Archives and found records for 56 aerial victory claims, plus one further unconfirmed claim. This figure of confirmed claims includes 55 aerial victories on the Eastern Front and one on the Western Front.

Victory claims were logged to a map-reference (PQ = Planquadrat), for example "PQ 4931". The Luftwaffe grid map (Jägermeldenetz) covered all of Europe, western Russia and North Africa and was composed of rectangles measuring 15 minutes of latitude by 30 minutes of longitude, an area of about 360 square miles (930 km^{2}). These sectors were then subdivided into 36 smaller units to give a location area 3 km × 4 km (1.9 mi × 2.5 mi) in size.

Chronicle of aerial victories
This and the – (dash) indicates unconfirmed aerial victory claims for which Schwaiger did not receive credit. This along with the * (asterisk) indicates an Herausschuss (separation shot)—a severely damaged heavy bomber forced to separate from his combat box which was counted as an aerial victory. This along with the & (ampersand) indicates a endgültige Vernichtung (final destruction)—a coup de grâce inflicted on an already damaged heavy bomber. This and the ? (question mark) indicates information discrepancies listed by Prien, Stemmer, Rodeike, Bock, Mathews and Foreman.
Claim	Date	Time	Type	Location	Claim	Date	Time	Type	Location
– 6. Staffel of Jagdgeschwader 3 "Udet" – Operation Barbarossa — 22 June – 1 November 1941
1	16 August 1941	06:55	DB-3		5	26 August 1941	16:15	Pe-2	east of Dnipropetrovsk
2	19 August 1941	13:55? (Note: According to Mathews and Foreman claimed at 13:55.)	I-153		6	3 September 1941	07:55	Pe-2	
3	21 August 1941	07:55	DB-3		7	8 September 1941	13:47	SB-2	
4	21 August 1941	07:58	DB-3		8	6 October 1941	09:20	Pe-2	
– 6. Staffel of Jagdgeschwader 3 "Udet" – Eastern Front — 26 April – 31 July 1942
9	27 May 1942	12:50	Il-2		15	24 July 1942	13:20	Yak-1	PQ 4931; 10 km (6.2 mi) southwest of Bassargino
10	29 May 1942	18:35	V-11 (Il-2)		16	26 July 1942	08:15	Il-2	
11	29 May 1942	18:40	V-11 (Il-2)		17	26 July 1942	08:20	Il-2	
12	4 June 1942	17:27	Il-2		18	27 July 1942	11:40	Yak-1	PQ 39251; 10 km (6.2 mi) northwest of Pitomnik
13	11 June 1942	12:27	Il-2		19	31 July 1942	13:55	Il-2	PQ 39192, Kalach; 10 km (6.2 mi) west of Kalach
14	22 July 1942	05:00	I-16		20	31 July 1942	14:00	LaGG-3	PQ 39184; 20 km (12 mi) west of Kalach
– 2. Staffel of Jagdgeschwader 3 "Udet" – Eastern Front — August – September 1942
21	4 August 1942	16:30	MiG-1	PQ 35 Ost 38285; 30 km (19 mi) south of Shutow	31	20 August 1942	10:32	LaGG-3	PQ 35 Ost 49451; Leninsk airfield
22	5 August 1942	17:37	LaGG-3	PQ 35 Ost 49739	32	21 August 1942	17:42	LaGG-3	PQ 35 Ost 49124; 10 km (6.2 mi) north of Gumrak
23	9 August 1942	11:50? (Note: According to Mathews and Foreman claimed at 11:47.)	Yak-1	PQ 35 Ost 39417; 10 km (6.2 mi) southeast of Kalach	33	28 August 1942	05:18	MiG-1	PQ 35 Ost 40894
24	9 August 1942	12:00	Yak-1	3 km (1.9 mi) southeast of Nadeshda vicinity of Bassargino	34	29 August 1942	13:50	P-40	PQ 35 Ost 49261; 20 km (12 mi) south of Stalingrad
25	12 August 1942	04:22	LaGG-3	PQ 35 Ost 3946	35	31 August 1942	16:07	Il-2	PQ 35 Ost 49333 vicinity of Stalingrad
26	13 August 1942	17:54	MiG-1	PQ 35 Ost 39432; 10 km (6.2 mi) south of Pitomnik	36	3 September 1942	04:55	LaGG-3	PQ 35 Ost 40813
27	17 August 1942	16:51	Il-2	PQ 35 Ost 30894; 20 km (12 mi) north of Pitomnik	37	4 September 1942	17:10? (Note: According to Mathews and Foreman claimed at 17:01.)	Yak-1	PQ 35 Ost 49241; 5–10 km (3.1–6.2 mi) northeast of Stalingrad
28	17 August 1942	16:52	Il-2	PQ 35 Ost 40773, Katschalinskaja	38	6 September 1942	17:05	LaGG-3	PQ 35 Ost 49134; 5 km (3.1 mi) north of Grebenka
29	17 August 1942	16:59? (Note: According to Mathews and Foreman claimed at 16:58.)	Il-2	PQ 40793 vicinity of Spartak	39	29 September 1942	10:05	Il-2	PQ 35 Ost 49251, northeast of Stalingrad; 20 km (12 mi) east-northeast of Stalingrad
30	20 August 1942	10:21? (Note: According to Mathews and Foreman claimed at 10:25.)	Pe-2	PQ 35 Ost 49631	40	29 September 1942	10:08	Il-2	PQ 35 Ost 49222; 20 km (12 mi) northeast of Stalingrad
– 3. Staffel of Jagdgeschwader 3 "Udet" – Eastern Front — September 1942
41	29 September 1942	15:50	MiG-3? (Note: According to Mathews and Foreman claimed as a Mikoyan-Gurevich MiG-1.)	PQ 35 Ost 59161					
– 2. Staffel of Jagdgeschwader 3 "Udet" – Eastern Front — September 1942
42	30 September 1942	14:45	LaGG-3	15 km (9.3 mi) north of Kotluban railway station					
– 3. Staffel of Jagdgeschwader 3 "Udet" – Eastern Front — October – November 1942
43	4 October 1942	16:07	La-5	6 km (3.7 mi) east of Tschagarniki	50	9 October 1942	14:43	LaGG-3	PQ 35 Ost 49124; 10 km (6.2 mi) north of Gumrak
44	5 October 1942	07:12	MiG-1	PQ 35 Ost 40424	51	15 October 1942	07:58	R-5	PQ 35 Ost 59314
45	6 October 1942	14:02	Il-2	PQ 35 Ost 40442	52	29 October 1942	14:15	LaGG-3	PQ 35 Ost 59321
46	6 October 1942	14:14	MiG-1	PQ 35 Ost 40432	53	31 October 1942	13:20	LaGG-3	PQ 35 Ost 50171
47	7 October 1942	08:58	Yak-1	8 km (5.0 mi) east of Kolobowka	54	2 November 1942	06:20	LaGG-3	PQ 35 Ost 49491; 40 km (25 mi) east of Stalingrad
48	8 October 1942	08:40	LaGG-3	PQ 35 Ost 50672	55	2 November 1942	06:58	R-5	PQ 35 Ost 49434; 40 km (25 mi) east of Stalingrad
49	9 October 1942	14:38	LaGG-3	PQ 35 Ost 49931; 5 km (3.1 mi) north of Grebenka					
– 2. Staffel of Jagdgeschwader 3 "Udet" – Defense of the Reich — 1 May – 22 October 1943
— ? (Note: This unconfirmed claim is not listed by Mathews and Foreman.)	30 July 1943	—	B-17&		56? (Note: This claim is not listed by Mathews and Foreman.)	19 August 1943	19:00	B-17*	PQ 05 Ost S/KL
— ? (Note: This unconfirmed claim is not listed by Prien, Stemmer, Rodeike and Bock.)	12 August 1943	09:30	B-17						
– 1. Staffel of Jagdgeschwader 3 "Udet" – Defense of the Reich — 9 January – 24 April 1944
57	19 April 1944	10:55	P-51	PQ 05 Ost S/LU-6 south of Hannoversch Münden, east of Kassel					

=== Awards ===
- Iron Cross (1939) 2nd and 1st Class
- German Cross in Gold on 29 October 1942 as Unteroffizier in the 3./Jagdgeschwader 3
- Knight's Cross of the Iron Cross on 29 October 1942 as Unteroffizier and pilot in the 6./Jagdgeschwader 3 "Udet" (Note: According to Scherzer as pilot in the I./Jagdgeschwader 3 "Udet".)

== Notes ==
Military offices
Preceded by Leutnant Hans Frese	Squadron Leader of 1./JG 3; 7 March 1944 – 24 April 1944	Succeeded by Hauptmann Ernst-Albert Laube
