= Gustav Frielinghaus =

German World War II fighter pilot

- Born: 5 March 1912; Osnabrück
- Died: 11 September 1963 (aged 51); Düsseldorf
- Military career
- Allegiance: Nazi Germany
- Branch: Luftwaffe
- Service years: ?-1945
- Rank: Hauptmann (captain)
- Units: JG 3, JGr Süd, EJG 1
- Commands: IV./JG 3
- Conflicts: World War II: Operation Barbarossa; Siege of Malta; Battle of Stalingrad; Italian Campaign
- Awards: Knight's Cross of the Iron Cross

Gustav Frielinghaus (5 March 1912 – 11 September 1963) was a German Luftwaffe ace and recipient of the Knight's Cross of the Iron Cross during World War II. The Knight's Cross of the Iron Cross, and its variants were the highest awards in the military and paramilitary forces of Nazi Germany during World War II. Frielinghaus was credited with 74 aerial victories during World War II.

== Early life and career ==
Frielinghaus was born on 5 March 1912 in Osnabrück in the Province of Hanover within the German Empire.

== World War II ==
On 25 July 1941, Frielinghaus claimed two Ilyushin DB-3 bombers shot down. In this encounter, his Messerschmitt Bf 109 F-2 (Werknummer 8996—factory number) sustained combat damage near Stawiszce resulting in a crash landing, flipping over the aircraft, and injuring him.

In May 1942, II. Gruppe of Jagdgeschwader 3 "Udet" (JG 3—3rd Fighter Wing) was stationed at Plzeň for rest and refit before it was relocated to the Eastern Front on 18 May 1942. Too late to participate in the Battle of the Kerch Peninsula, it was located on the left wing of Army Group South, assigned to an airfield at Chuguyev in the Kharkov area where they arrived on 19 May.

From 25 March to 20 April 1943, Frielinghaus briefly substituted for Oberleutnant Paul Stolte as commander of 6. Staffel. Stolte had been wounded in combat on 25 March.

=== Mediterranean theater ===
As part of the Luftwaffe plan to expand its fighter force, a fourth Gruppe was to be added to every Geschwader. This was achieved by transferring some of the other Gruppen's personnel and equipment. This created the nucleus of a newly formed Gruppe. IV. Gruppe of JG 3 was officially created on 1 June 1943 at Neubiberg Airfield and placed under command of Major Franz Beyer while Frielinghaus was given command of 11. Staffel. The Gruppe was initially equipped with the Messerschmitt Bf 109 G-6, some carrying a pair of 20 mm MG 151/20 cannons installed in conformal gun pods under the wings. In mid-June, the Gruppe was ordered to Italy to fight in the Mediterranean theater.

On 11 July, IV. Gruppe of JG 3 was ordered to an airfield at Ramacca, Sicily. There, the Gruppe supported German forces defending against the Allied invasion of Sicily. Due to the advancing Allied forces, the airfield had to be abandoned on 15 July, forcing the Gruppe to retreat to Leverano. The next day, Frielinghaus claimed two Supermarine Spitfire fighters shot down in the combat area south and south-southwest of Licata. On 13 July, Frielinghaus claimed a Lockheed P-38 Lightning fighter shot down southwest of Caltanissetta. On 20 August, Frielinghaus claimed a Lockheed P-38 Lightning fighter shot down east of Gaeta. On 9 September, Frielinghaus was shot down and wounded in his Messerschmitt Bf 109 G-6 (Werknummer 18861—factory number) in aerial combat near Orta Nova. In consequence, command of 11. Staffel was passed on to Leutnant Hermann Schmied.

On 1 May 1944, Frielinghaus was appointed Gruppenkommandeur (group commander) of II. Gruppe of JG 3. He succeeded Leutnant Leopold Münster who temporarily had led the Gruppe after its former commander Hauptmann Hermann Freiherr von Kap-herr was killed in action. Frielinghaus took command at Gardelegen Airfield. Since Frielinghaus was still convalescing from injuries sustained in December 1943, Frielinghaus led the Gruppe from the ground while Münster continued to lead in the air.

== Later life ==
Frielinghaus died on 11 September 1963 at the age of 50 in Düsseldorf, West Germany.

== Summary of career ==
=== Aerial victory claims ===
According to US historian David T. Zabecki, Frielinghaus was credited with 74 aerial victories. Spick also lists him with 74 aerial victories claimed in approximately 500 combat missions. Mathews and Foreman, authors of Luftwaffe Aces — Biographies and Victory Claims, researched the German Federal Archives and found records for 69 aerial victory claims, plus one further unconfirmed claim. This figure includes 61 aerial victories on the Eastern Front and eight over the Western Allies.

Victory claims were logged to a map-reference (PQ = Planquadrat), for example "PQ 29372". The Luftwaffe grid map (Jägermeldenetz) covered all of Europe, western Russia and North Africa and was composed of rectangles measuring 15 minutes of latitude by 30 minutes of longitude, an area of about 360 square miles (930 km^{2}). These sectors were then subdivided into 36 smaller units to give a location area 3 km × 4 km (1.9 mi × 2.5 mi) in size.

Chronicle of aerial victories
This and the ? (question mark) indicates information discrepancies listed by Prien, Stemmer, Rodeike, Bock, Mathews and Foreman.
Claim	Date	Time	Type	Location	Claim	Date	Time	Type	Location
– 6. Staffel of Jagdgeschwader 3 – Operation Barbarossa — 22 June – 1 November 1941
1	6 July 1941	05:35	SB-2	35 km (22 mi) south of Polonnoje	5	6 October 1941	10:19	Pe-2	
2	25 July 1941	14:25	DB-3		6	11 October 1941	11:57	SB-3	northeast of Moschowaja
3	25 July 1941	14:42	DB-3		7	24 October 1941	13:12	I-61 (MiG-3)	
4	26 August 1941	16:25	I-17 (MiG-1)	60 km (37 mi) north-northeast of Dnjepropetrowsk					
– Stab II. Gruppe of Jagdgeschwader 3 "Udet" – Eastern Front — 26 April – August 1942
8	29 May 1942	15:56	MiG-1	west of Alexandrovka	20? (Note: This claim is not listed by Mathews and Foreman.)	2 August 1942	10:40	LaGG-3	
9	2 June 1942	17:49	MiG-1	4 km (2.5 mi) east of Chjetawoj	21?	2 August 1942	10:40	LaGG-3	
10	23 June 1942	18:09	LaGG-3	east of Ulyanovka	22	3 August 1942	14:57	Yak-1	south of Peskovatka
11	24 June 1942	11:52	LaGG-3		23?	4 August 1942	15:40	Il-2	
12	29 June 1942	18:44	Pe-2	northwest of Kshen	24	6 August 1942	11:23	Pe-2	southeast of Ssalinskij
13	1 July 1942	18:54	Il-2	Wolowo	25	6 August 1942	15:23	Il-2	south of Sarepta
14	4 July 1942	10:27	MiG-1	12 km (7.5 mi) northeast of Kastornoye	26	7 August 1942	14:13	Pe-2	south of Jakodniki
15	5 July 1942	16:27	Il-2	11 km (6.8 mi) south of Malysheva	27	8 August 1942	09:47	Su-2	west of Popov
16	6 July 1942	11:41	Il-2	50 km (31 mi) east of Voronezh	28	8 August 1942	09:52	Su-2	northwest of Kalach
17	21 July 1942	10:14	V-11		29	10 August 1942	07:08	MiG-1	southeast of Kalach
18? (Note: According to Mathews and Foreman this claim is unconfirmed.)	22 July 1942	16:10	LaGG-3		30	17 August 1942	09:11	R-5	north of Majew
19	30 July 1942	11:44	MiG-1	Leonow	31?	23 August 1942	08:48	Il-2	
– 6. Staffel of Jagdgeschwader 3 "Udet" – Eastern Front — December 1942 – 3 February 1943
32	21 December 1942	12:39	Boston	40 km (25 mi) north of Morozovsk (Morosowskaja)	36	5 January 1943	09:42	MiG-1	PQ 29372
33	29 December 1942	11:32	MiG-1	7 km (4.3 mi) west of Pitschugi	37	15 January 1943	12:32	DB-3	PQ 49334
34	30 December 1942	09:09	MiG-1	PQ 39295	38	3 February 1943	09:25	Boston	PQ 09183
35	30 December 1942	09:13	PS-84	PQ 39454					
– 6. Staffel of Jagdgeschwader 3 "Udet" – Eastern Front — 4 February – May 1943
39	10 February 1943	13:33	LaGG-3	PQ 34 Ost 99481, vicinity of Makariv Yar	53	16 April 1943	16:58	LaGG-3	
40	22 February 1943	09:32	MiG-1	PQ 34 Ost 9835, vicinity of Petropavlovk	54	17 April 1943	11:21	LaGG-3	PQ 34 Ost 85753, southeast of Gelendzhik
41	27 February 1943	15:27	LaGG-3	PQ 34 Ost 98652, north of Rostov	55	17 April 1943	14:04	I-153	PQ 34 Ost 75414, west of Novorossiysk
42	14 March 1943	13:07	LaGG-3	PQ 34 Ost 98674, vicinity of Kuteinikow	56	19 April 1943	11:52	Il-2	PQ 34 Ost 75414, Novorossiysk
43	17 March 1943	10:48	Boston	PQ 35 Ost 70481, east of Ssenkowo	57	19 April 1943	11:56	Il-2	PQ 34 Ost 75491, west of Gelendzhik
44	22 March 1943	12:05	LaGG-3	PQ 34 Ost 98692, west of Rostov	58	19 April 1943	11:58	Il-2	
45	25 March 1943	13:32	LaGG-3	PQ 34 Ost 98813, west of Rostov	59	23 April 1943	17:12	LaGG-3	PQ 34 Ost 75422, north of Novorossiysk
46	27 March 1943	11:12	LaGG-3	PQ 34 Ost 97242, southeast of Asov	60	28 April 1943	08:56	LaGG-3	PQ 34 Ost 86632, northeast of Andrejewskaja
47	31 March 1943	09:32	LaGG-3	PQ 34 Ost 98651, north of Rostov	61	8 May 1943	07:55	Spitfire	PQ 34 Ost 85181, south of Achtyrskaja
48	11 April 1943	12:11	LaGG-3	PQ 34 Ost 85724, southeast of Gelendzhik over sea	62	9 May 1943	10:10	Yak-1	PQ 34 Ost 76852, southwest of Anastassijewskaja
49	11 April 1943	13:53	LaGG-3	PQ 34 Ost 75344, southeast of Anapa over sea	63	10 May 1943	15:27	Yak-1	PQ 34 Ost 86753, Troizkaja
50	15 April 1943	09:39	LaGG-3	PQ 34 Ost 85373, northeast of Gelendzhik	64	17 May 1943	11:16	LaGG-3	PQ 35 Ost 71114, southwest of Cholodnoje
51	15 April 1943	12:37	I-16	PQ 34 Ost 85142, northwest of Abinskaja	65	17 May 1943	11:18	LaGG-3	PQ 35 Ost 71771, east of Chotomlja
52	15 April 1943	12:39	Il-2	PQ 34 Ost 85142, northwest of Abinskaja	66	17 May 1943	11:21	LaGG-3	PQ 35 Ost 72714, south of Troitzkoje
– 11. Staffel of Jagdgeschwader 3 "Udet" – Mediterranean theater — 1 July – 9 September 1943
67	12 July 1943	11:09	Spitfire	30 km (19 mi) south of Licata	71	28 August 1943	16:05	P-38	35 km (22 mi) southwest of Ischia
68	12 July 1943	11:16	Spitfire	30 km (19 mi) south-southwest of Licata	72	30 August 1943	12:29	P-38	southwest of Ischia
69	13 July 1943	18:11	P-38	10 km (6.2 mi) southwest of Caltanissetta	73	2 September 1943	13:38	P-38	PQ 14 Ost 31474
70	20 August 1943	13:49	P-38	10 km (6.2 mi) east of Gaeta; 15 km (9.3 mi) south Gallio	74	2 September 1943	13:42	P-38	PQ 14 Ost 31487

=== Awards ===
- Iron Cross (1939) 2nd and 1st Class
- Honor Goblet of the Luftwaffe on 7 September 1942 as Leutnant and pilot
- German Cross in Gold on 24 September 1942 as Leutnant in the Stab II./Jagdgeschwader 3
- Knight's Cross of the Iron Cross on 5 February 1944 as Hauptmann and Gruppenkommandeur of the IV./Jagdgeschwader 3 "Udet" (Note: According to Scherzer as Oberleutnant in the Stab IV./Jagdgeschwader 3.)
