= Jagdgeschwader 3 =

- Active: 1939–45
- Country: Nazi Germany
- Branch: Luftwaffe
- Type: Fighter Aircraft
- Role: Air superiority
- Size: Air Force Wing
- Nickname(s): Udet
- Patron: Ernst Udet
- Fighter Aircraft: Messerschmitt Bf 109, Focke-Wulf Fw 190A, Focke-Wulf Fw 190D-9
- Engagements: Western Front: Battle of France; Battle of Britain; Eastern Front (World War II): German-Soviet air war 22 June 1941; Air war Barbarossa; Battle of Stalingrad; Battle of Kursk

Commanders
- Notable commanders: Günther Lützow, Heinrich Bär

Jagdgeschwader 3 (JG 3) "Udet" was a Luftwaffe fighter wing of World War II. The Geschwader operated on all the German fronts in the European Theatre of World War II. It was named after Ernst Udet, an important figure in the development of the Luftwaffe, in 1942. (Note: Udet was Chief of Procurement and Supply for the Luftwaffe but committed suicide due to stress and alcoholism. The circumstances of his death were covered up and he was portrayed instead as a hero.)

== History ==
=== 1940 ===
Jagdschwader 3 "Udet" was formed on 1 May 1939 in Bernburg/Saale from JG 231. JG 3 was one of the Luftwaffe's fighter units that took part in the Battle of France. A particularly fruitful period over France occurred from 14 to 17 May 1940. Allied sorties over the area of German advance had attempted to prevent the German armour from crossing the Meuse and sent waves of inadequately protected bombers to do the job. As a result, 90 Allied bombers were shot down and the 14 May became known as the "day of the fighters" within the Luftwaffe. I./JG 3 destroyed seven fighters without loss on this day. On 15 May five were destroyed, again for no losses. On 17 May an entire formation of 13 Bristol Blenheims were shot down by I./JG 3. A total of 19 Allied aircraft were shot down by I./JG 3 alone on that day. The unit claimed some 179 aircraft shot down. Oberleutnant Lothar Keller was top claimant with 10 kills, and I./JG 3 Gruppenkommandeur Maj. Günther Lützow scored 9. I./JG3 was the most successful Gruppe, with 88 enemy aircraft destroyed for ten Bf 109s lost while six pilots were killed and one wounded.

JG 3 later flew intensively in the Battle of Britain. On 21 August 1940, Oberstleutnant Lützow was appointed Kommodore of JG 3. He recorded 8 more victories during the aerial battles over England. Lützow was awarded the Ritterkreuz (Knights Cross) on 18 September. By the end of 1940 its most successful pilots were Oblt. Erwin Neuerberg (11 claims) and Lt Helmut Meckel (9 claims). The Geschwader lost some 51 pilots killed or POW July–December 1940. I Gruppe alone had destroyed exactly 50 enemy machines, but in exchange of 32 Messerschmitts of which 20 were lost to enemy action. Ten pilots were killed or missing while a further 11 were captured.

=== 1941 ===
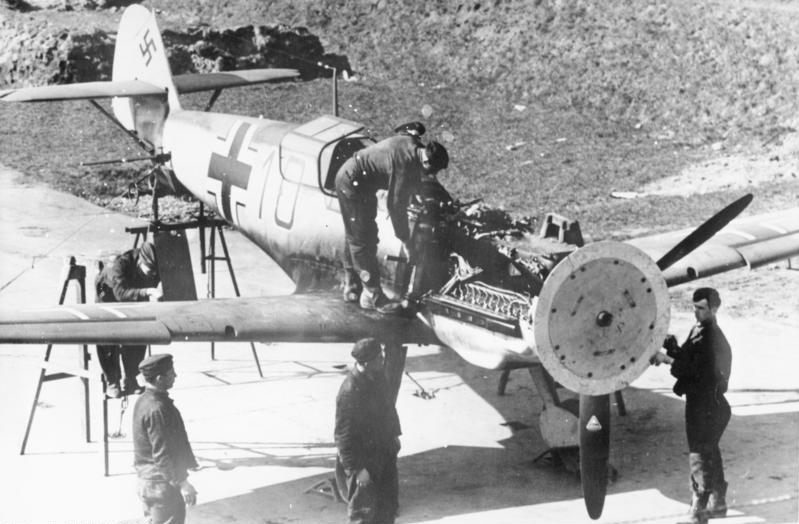
Adjusting the machine guns of a Messerschmitt Bf 109 E-1 of the Jagdgeschwader 3 (JG 3).

The Geschwader took part in Operation Barbarossa from 22 June 1941 onwards, and during the offensive against the Soviets JG 3 claimed its 1,000th aircraft destroyed on 30 August. Lützow became the second Experte to achieve 100 victories when he downed three Russian fighters near Moscow on 24 October. Lützow was then grounded. On 27 June 1941, Hauptmann Gordon Gollob was made Gruppenkommandeur II./JG 3, following the mid-air collision death of Hauptman Lothar Keller. He claimed 18 victories in August and achieved 37 victories in October, including 9 aircraft shot down over the Perekop Isthmus on 18 October and 6 aircraft on 22 October. He was awarded the Eichenlaub (Oak Leaves) on 26 October for 85 victories. He led II./JG 3 until November 1941. In the period 22 June – 5 December 1941, the unit destroyed 1,298 Soviet aircraft in return for 58 losses in aerial combat and losing 10 aircraft on the ground.

II./JG 3, under the command of Captain Karl-Heinz Krahl was transferred to Comiso on Sicily in January 1942 to bolster JG 53 and the Regia Aeronautica which were carrying out sustained attacks against Malta. At this time the unit was equipped with Bf 109F-4 Trops. At the end of April II Gruppe departed Sicily for a brief stay in Germany before being redeployed to the Eastern front.

=== 1942 ===
In mid-September, I./JG 3 were ordered back to Germany for rest and refit. However, a number of I. Gruppe pilots remained in Russia serving with III./JG 3. After refitting with Bf 109F-4 fighters, I./JG 3 was ordered to relocate to bases in the Netherlands in December 1941. On 6 January 1942, it became II./JG 1, with a new I. Gruppe being raised.

By early 1942, JG 3 was awarded the honour name "Udet" (after Ernst Udet) and was then often simply referred as "Jagdgeschwader Udet" thereafter. In May 1942, Lützow led most of JG 3 back to Russia and commenced operations in the Kharkiv area. There followed intensive operations through the Crimea, and in the drive towards Stalingrad. Again JG 3 was one of the Luftwaffe's top units, fighting on the Southern Front, reaching 2,000 claims on 28 May 1942. On 12 August, Major Wolf-Dietrich Wilcke was appointed Kommodore of JG 3.

In June 1942 II Gruppe was transferred back to the East, where it joined in the advance on the Stalingrad front, suffering heavy losses. During the Battle of Stalingrad, Stab./JG 3 were based at Pitomnik Airfield, where Wilcke directed all day fighter operations over the city. During the summer offensive of 1942 the Geschwaderstab/JG 3 recorded 137 victories, of which Wilcke claimed 97.

When Russian forces encircled Stalingrad, the Geschwaderstab/JG 3 was transferred to Morozovskaya-Öst, outside the pocket. In mid-November 1942 JG 3 then provided the famous Platzschutzstaffel (airfield defence squadron) which defended the besieged 6th Army in Stalingrad until late 1942. On a rotational basis up to six volunteer pilots drawn from I. and II./JG 3 formed a defence Staffel within the rapidly contracting Stalingrad perimeter. The Staffel, among others, included Oberleutnant Werner Lucas, Leutnant Gustav Frielinghaus, Leutnant Georg Schentke, Feldwebel Kurt Ebener, and Feldwebel Hans Grünberg. Their purpose was to cover the Junkers Ju 52 transports flying supplies into Pitomnik Airfield and to protect the aircraft while on the ground. Despite often only having 2 or 3 Bf 109's serviceable, in the last 6 weeks of the siege (until mid January) claimed some 130 Soviet aircraft shot down. In return JG 3 lost 90-victory experte Leutnant Schentke over the city on 25 December 1942. In mid-January the pilots were ordered to fly out of the pocket and rejoin their parent unit, although some thirty ground crew remaining became prisoners when the city surrendered to the Soviets on 2 February 1943.

=== 1943 ===
II./JG 3 was relocated to the Kuban bridgehead in February 1943. Oblt. Wolf-Udo Ettel proved the 'star' of JG 3 around this time, claiming 28 kills in March 1943, 36 in April, and 20 in May. Intensive operations around the Kerch peninsula followed in April. In July 1943 II./JG 3 and III./JG 3 at this time were part of Luftlotte 4 and flew in Operation Zitadelle, the tank offensive launched around the Kursk salient. On 5 July 1943 alone, II./JG 3 claimed 77 Soviet aircraft from a total claimed of 432, Oblt. Joachim Kirschner claiming 9 kills and Gruppenkommandeur Hpt. Kurt Brändle claiming 5.

As Allied air operations over Germany increased during mid 1943 each of the gruppen of JG 3 were in turn recalled to Germany to defend the homeland on so called Reichsverteidigung ("Defense of the Reich") duty. I. /JG 3 moved back to Germany in April 1943, but did not go operational until June 1943. Equipped with the new Bf 109G-6 Kanonenboote with two 20mm cannons in underwing gondolas, I./JG 3 were slowly worked up as a 'bomber-killer' unit. This long training period paid dividends as the gruppe started to shoot down impressive numbers of USAAF bombers without the heavy losses incurred by many Jagdgeschwadern thrown into the battle with less preparation. Lt. Franz Schwaiger was by this time I./JG 3's current top scorer with 56 claims.

By late summer 1943 III./JG3 were also flying the Bf 109G-6 and Bf 109G-6/R6. On its return to Germany, the Stab/JG 3 was based at Mönchengladbach. On 4 December 1943 Hpt. Wilhelm Lemke (131 kills) was killed in combat with P-47s of the 352nd Fighter Group.

As with most fighter units operating over Germany and occupied Europe, JG 3 suffered heavy losses through early 1944 against the increasing numbers of USAAF escort fighters, losing many of its experienced personnel and commanders. Wilcke was shot down and killed by fighters of the 4th Fighter Group. Wilcke's successor as commander of JG 3 was Major Friedrich-Karl "Tutti" Müller, the CO of IV. /JG 3. He was killed in a landing accident at Salzwedel on 29 May 1944.

=== 1944 ===
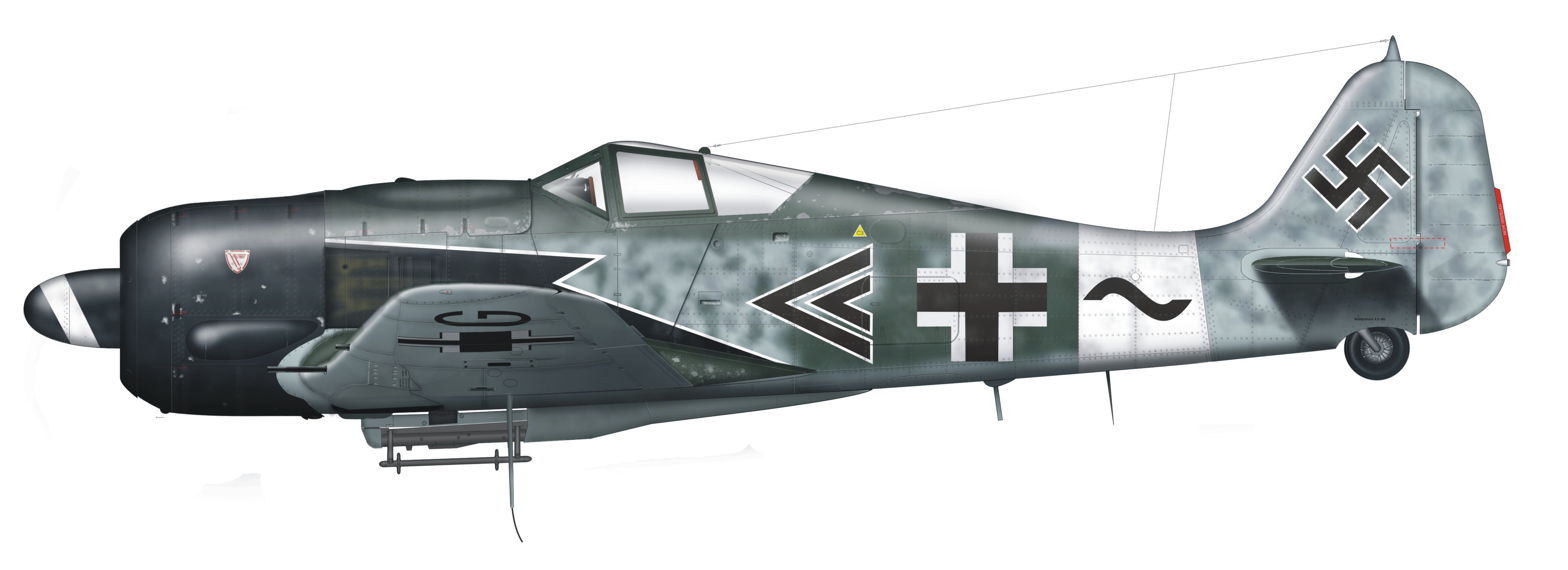
Fw 190A "Sturmböcke" fighter belonging to the unit

With the increased pressure caused by the American bombing raids against targets in Germany through late 1943 and early 1944, a new method of attacking the bombers was proposed for specially armoured fighters to get in as close to the bombers as possible before opening fire, even (as a last resort) deliberately ramming the bomber. A special Staffel was formed to test the tactical viability. Sturmstaffel 1 was the first experimental unit to fly the so-called Sturmböcke (Battering Ram) up-gunned Focke-Wulf Fw 190A aircraft, and was attached to JG 3, following the general demise of the Zerstörergruppen as bomber destroyers earlier in 1944. The Sturmstaffel was expanded into a specialised bomber 'killer' Gruppen, IV./JG 3, led by Hauptmann Wilhelm Moritz. Sturmstaffel 1 was redesignated 11./JG 3 in May 1944.

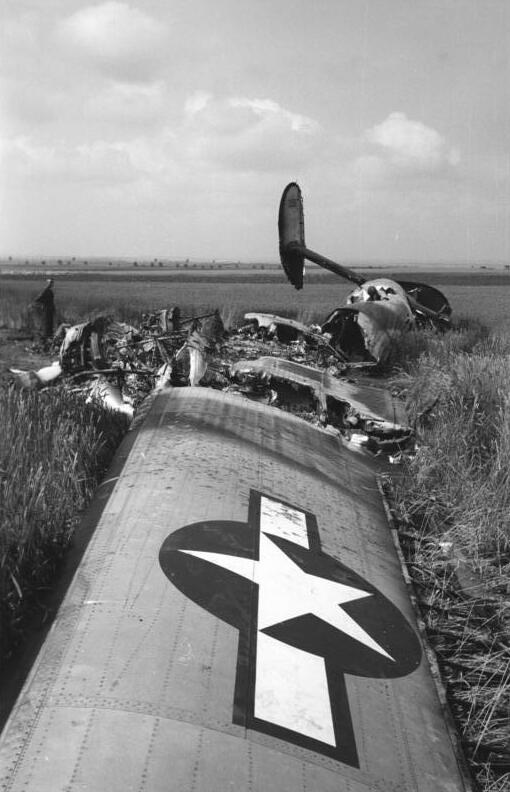
Downed Consolidated B-24 Liberator of the 492nd Bomb Group after an aerial battle over Oschersleben on 7 July 1944

On 7 July 1944 a force of 1,129 B-17 Flying Fortresses and B-24 Liberators of the United States Army Air Forces (USAAF) Eighth Air Force set out from England to bomb aircraft factories in the Leipzig area and the synthetic oil plants at Boehlen, Leuna-Merseburg and Lützkendorf. This formation was intercepted by a German Gefechtsverband composed of IV.(Sturm) / JG 3 escorted by two Gruppen of Bf 109s from Jagdgeschwader 300 led by Major Walther Dahl. Dahl drove the attack to point-blank range behind the Liberators of the 492nd Bomb Group before opening fire. 492nd Bomb Group was temporarily without fighter cover. Within about a minute the entire squadron of twelve B-24s had been destroyed. The USAAF 2nd Air Division lost 28 Liberators that day, the majority to the Sturmgruppe attack. IV./JG 3 lost nine fighters shot down and three more suffered damage and made crash landings; five of the unit's pilots were killed.

II./JG 3 and III./JG 3 were thrown into the Operation Overlord air battles over the Normandy beach-head in June 1944, and, with the other 23 Gruppen committed were decimated by the hordes of Allied fighters present. On 10 August, 10.(Sturm)/JG 3 was renamed 13.(Sturm)/JG 3. On 16 August 1944, 13./JG 3 Staffelkaptän Oblt. Ekkehard Tichy (25 kills) was killed when he rammed a B-17; Tichy had lost an eye a year earlier but had continued flying combat missions. By 5 September 1944, when the Gruppe was withdrawn from the battle, III./JG 3 alone had lost a staggering 56 pilots killed or missing, 23 wounded and 4 POW, while claiming some 54 Allied aircraft shot down. Just the Gruppenkommandeur, 3 Staffelkapitäne and 4 replacement pilots had survived the three months over the invasion front.

On 2 November the two Sturmgruppen of IV./JG 3 and II./JG 4 successfully intercepted American bomber formations near Leipzig. IV./JG 3 attacked the 91st Bomb Group and claimed 13 Fortresses, including two by ramming, while II./JG 4 claimed nine Fortresses from the 457th Bomb Group. The fighter escorts cost JG 3 15 out of their 39 Sturmböcke aircraft, and JG 4 lost 16 out of 22 committed. II./JG 3 on the same day was much less successful when scrambled with other Gruppen to intercept American raids against oil plants in Merseburg. Its Bf 109s ran into the more than 209 P-51 Mustangs of the 20th, 352nd, 359th and 364th Fighter groups which escorted the 1st Bombardment Division. II./JG 3 lost 23 Bf 109s and claimed only three Mustangs and a B-17 shot down. On 5 December 1944, Major Moritz was relieved from command of IV./ JG 3 due to a complete nervous breakdown.

=== 1945 ===
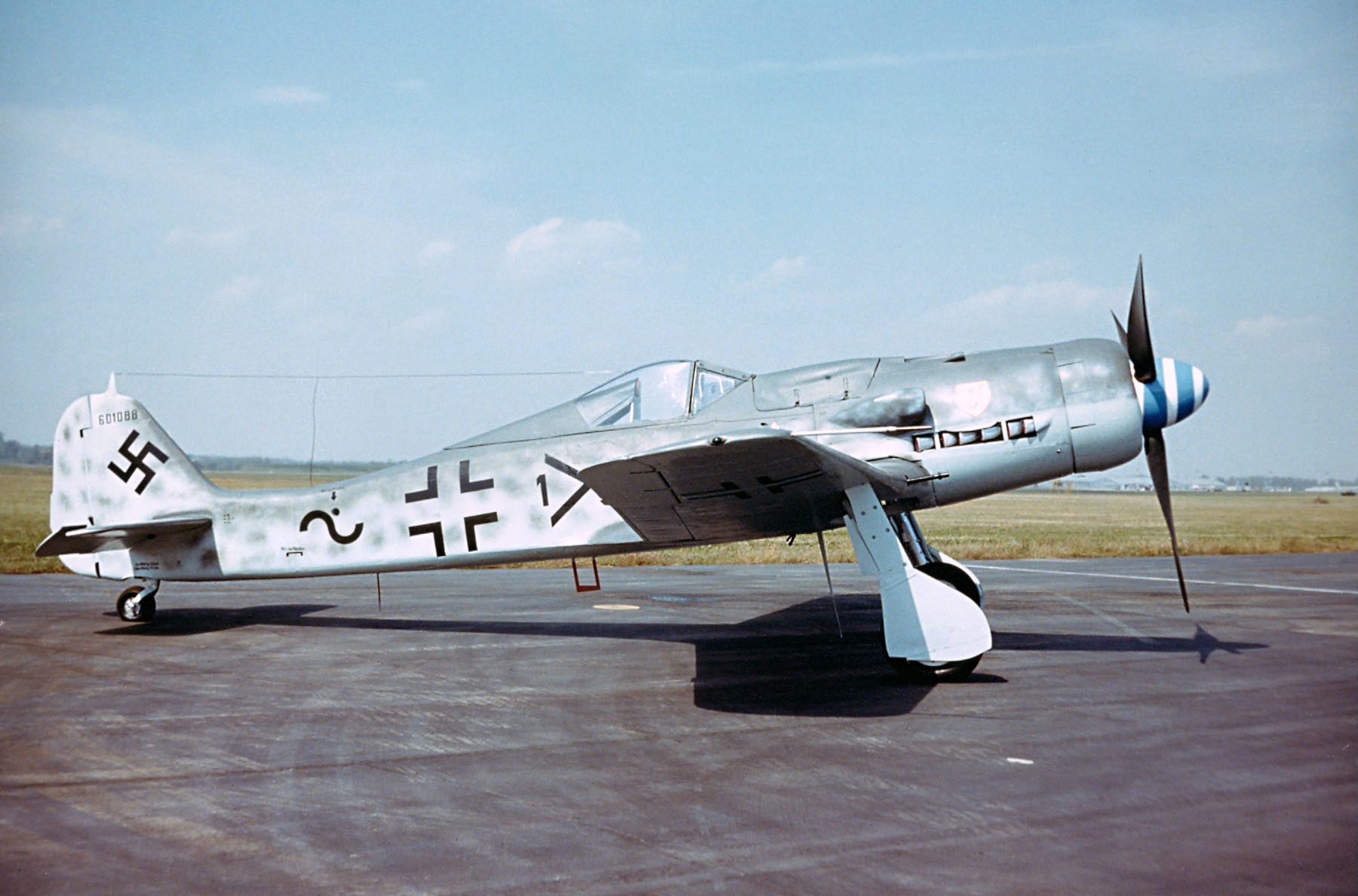
An Fw 190D-9 of JG 3, now at the NMUSAF

In November 1944 II./JG 3 was separated from the Geschwader in order to re-equip with the Me 262 jet fighter and become part of the first jet fighter Geschwader, Jagdgeschwader 7. A newly formed II./JG 3 was raised from a former bomber unit at the end of 1944; this new Gruppe was transferred to the East in early 1945 to counter the Soviet air offensive.

During Operation Bodenplatte, the massed attack on Allied airfields on 1 January 1945, Jagdschwader 3 was one of the few German fighter units to carry out their operations successfully despite fielding the smallest German force that day. The 22 Fw 190s committed destroyed 43 Typhoons and Spitfires and damaged 60 more in a 20-minute attack on the 2nd TAF airfield at Eindhoven (JG 3 claimed 116 destroyed). However the loss of 16 pilots was a serious blow to the unit. Six were captured, 6 were killed while four were posted as missing. Six pilots returned, three of them were wounded.

== Commanding officers ==
=== Wing commanders ===
| • Oberstleutnant Max Ibel | 1 November 1938 | – | 26 September 1939 |
| • Oberst Karl Vieck | 26 September 1939 | – | 20 August 1940 |
| • Oberst Günther Lützow | 21 August 1940 | – | 11 August 1942 |
| • Major Wolf-Dietrich Wilcke | 12 August 1942 | – | 23 March 1944 † (Note: Shot down attacking USAAF raid on Braunschweig) |
| • Major Friedrich-Karl "Tutti" Müller | 25 March 1944 | – | 29 May 1944 † (Note: killed in an accident when his Bf 109 stalled on landing approach) |
| • Major Heinrich Bär | 1 June 1944 | – | 13 February 1945 |
| • Major Werner Schröer | 14 February 1945 | – | May 1945 |

=== Group commanders ===
I. Gruppe of JG 3

| • Major Otto Heinrich von Houwald | 1 April 1939 | – | 31 October 1939 |
| • Hauptmann Günther Lützow | 3 November 1939 | – | 21 August 1940 |
| • Oberleutnant Lothar Keller | 24 August 1940 | – | 27 August 1940 |
| • Hauptmann Hans von Hahn | 27 August 1940 | – | 15 January 1942 |

On 15 January 1942, I. Gruppe of JG 3 became the II. Gruppe of JG 1. In consequence a new I. Gruppe of JG 3 was created on 1 March 1942.

| • Hauptmann Georg Michalek | 1 March 1942 | – | 31 August 1942 |
| • Major Klaus Quaet-Faslem | 31 August 1942 | – | 30 January 1944 † (Note: killed in a flying accident due to bad weather) |
| • Hauptmann Joachim von Wehren | 1 February 1944 | – | 7 February 1944 |
| • Hauptmann Josef Haiböck | 8 February 1944 | – | 25 February 1944 |
| • Major Dr. Langer | 25 February 1944 | – | 11 April 1944 |
| • Hauptmann Helmut Mertens | 14 April 1944 | – | 30 June 1944 |
| • Hauptmann Ernst Laube | 1 July 1944 | – | 30 October 1944 |
| • Hauptmann Horst Haase | 30 October 1944 | – | 26 November 1944 † |
| • Hauptmann Albert Wirges | 27 November 1944 | – | 2 December 1944 |
| • Oberleutnant Alfred Seidel | December 1944 | – | 31 March 1945 |

II. Gruppe of JG 3

| • Hauptmann Erich von Selle | 1 February 1940 | – | 30 September 1940 |
| • Hauptmann Erich Woitke (acting) | 1 October 1940 | – | 23 November 1940 |
| • Hauptmann Lothar Keller | 24 November 1940 | – | 26 June 1941 † (Note: Killed in flying accident) |
| • Hauptmann Gordon Gollob | 27 June 1941 | – | 20 November 1941 |
| • Hauptmann Karl-Heinz Krahl | 21 November 1941 | – | 14 April 1942 † (Note: Shot down by anti-aircraft guns over Malta.) |
| • Major Kurt Brändle | 15 April 1942 | – | 2 November 1943 |
| • Hauptmann Heinrich Sannemann (acting) | 3 November 1943 | – | November 1943 |
| • Hauptmann Wilhelm Lemke | November 1943 | – | 4 December 1943 † |
| • Hauptmann Heinrich Sannemann (acting) | 4 December 1943 | – | January 1944 |
| • Hauptmann Detlev Rohwer | February 1944 | – | 30 March 1944 † |
| • Hauptmann Heinrich Sannemann (acting) | 30 March 1944 | – | 22 April 1944 |
| • Hauptmann Hermann Freiherr von Kap-herr | 22 April 1944 | – | 24 April 1944 † |
| • Leutnant Leopold Münster (acting) | 24 April 1944 | – | 1 May 1944 |
| • Hauptmann Gustav Frielinghaus | 1 May 1944 | – | 25 June 1944 |
| • Hauptmann Hans-Ekkehard Bob | 25 June 1944 | – | July 1944 |
| • Hauptmann Herbert Kutscha | July 1944 | – | 30 November 1944 |

III. Gruppe of JG 3

| • Hauptmann Walter Kienitz | 1 March 1940 | – | 31 August 1940 |
| • Hauptmann Wilhelm Balthasar | 1 September 1940 | – | 10 November 1940 |
| • Hauptmann Walter Oesau | 11 November 1940 | – | 28 July 1941 |
| • Hauptmann Werner Andres | 1 August 1941 | – | 12 May 1942 |
| • Oberleutnant Herbert Kijewski (acting) | 1 September 1941 | – | 23 November 1941 |
| • Major Karl-Heinz Greisert | 18 May 1942 | – | 22 July 1942 † |
| • Major Wolfgang Ewald | 23 July 1942 | – | 14 July 1943 |
| • Major Walther Dahl | 20 July 1943 | – | 20 May 1944 |
| • Major Karl-Heinz Langer | 21 May 1944 | – | 8 May 1945 |

IV. Gruppe of JG 3

| • Major Franz Beyer | 1 June 1943 | – | 11 February 1944 † |
| • Hauptmann Heinz Lang (acting) | 11 February 1944 | – | 26 February 1944 |
| • Major Friedrich-Karl Müller | 26 February 1944 | – | 11 April 1944 |
| • Hauptmann Heinz Lang (acting) | 11 April 1944 | – | 18 April 1944 |
| • Major Wilhelm Moritz | 18 April 1944 | – | 5 December 1944 |
| • Hauptmann Hubert-York Weydenhammer | 5 December 1944 | – | 25 December 1944 † |
| • Major Erwin Bacsila | 5 January 1945 | – | 17 February 1945 |
| • Oberleutnant Oskar Romm | 17 February 1945 | – | 25 April 1945 |
| • Hauptmann Gerhard Koall | 25 April 1945 | – | 27 April 1945 † |
| • Hauptmann Günther Schack | 1 May 1945 | – | 8 May 1945 |

== See also ==
- Organization of the Luftwaffe during World War II
