= Gardelegen Airfield =

Former airfield in Germany

Gardelegen Airfield Fliegerhorst Gardelegen Advanced Landing Ground R-33
- Gardelegen Airfield (Germany)

Site information
- Type: Military Airfield

Location
- Coordinates: 52°32′10″N 011°26′27″E

Site history
- In use: 1936–1945
- Battles/wars: Western Front (World War II)

Gardelegen Airfield is a former military airfield, located 5.0 km (3.1 mi) east of Gardelegen in Saxony-Anhalt, Germany.

== History ==
Gardelgen Airfield was built in the late 1930s as a Luftwaffe airfield. Its history is undetermined during World War II. It is known that on 23 January 1945 a severe accident happened when a Ju 88 broke up during takeoff and crashed into a building, killing four in the ensuing fire.

The Americans moved into the area in late April 1945, It was used for casualty evacuation and battlefield supply by IX Air Service Command briefly before the German Capitulation on 8 May. The Americans withdrew from the area in July 1945 and the airfield was taken over by the Soviet Red Army as part of the Soviet Occupation Zone of Germany.

After the war the local inhabitants stripped the buildings to rebuild their own homes. Post war, the Russians took over the airfield, and it became a tank storage and repair depot, as it wasn't far from the Cold War front line, and it was envisaged that tanks would play a major part in any future warfare with the West. After German reunification, the country was keen to eradicate any memory of Russian occupation, and so the airfield was put to non military use.

Today the former airfield is an industrial area at the location, aptly called "Industriegebiet Fliegerhorst". The old airfield headquarters building was torn down in 2009; nothing remains of the airfield.
