= Jagdgeschwader 137 =

Fighter Wing 137
- Jagdgeschwader 137
- Country: Nazi Germany
- Branch: Luftwaffe

Jagdgeschwader 137 was a fighter wing of Nazi Germany's Luftwaffe during the interwar period. It was formed on 1 April 1937 without a wing staff by redesignating I./JG 232 and adding a new II. Gruppe on 1 July 1938.

== Bibliography ==
- Tessin, Georg (1974). Deutsche Verbände und Truppen 1918-1939: Altes Heer, Freiwilligenverbände, Reichswehr, Heer, Lutfwaffe, Landespolizei. Biblio-Verlag. ISBN 3-7648-1000-9.
