= Hostynne =

- Village
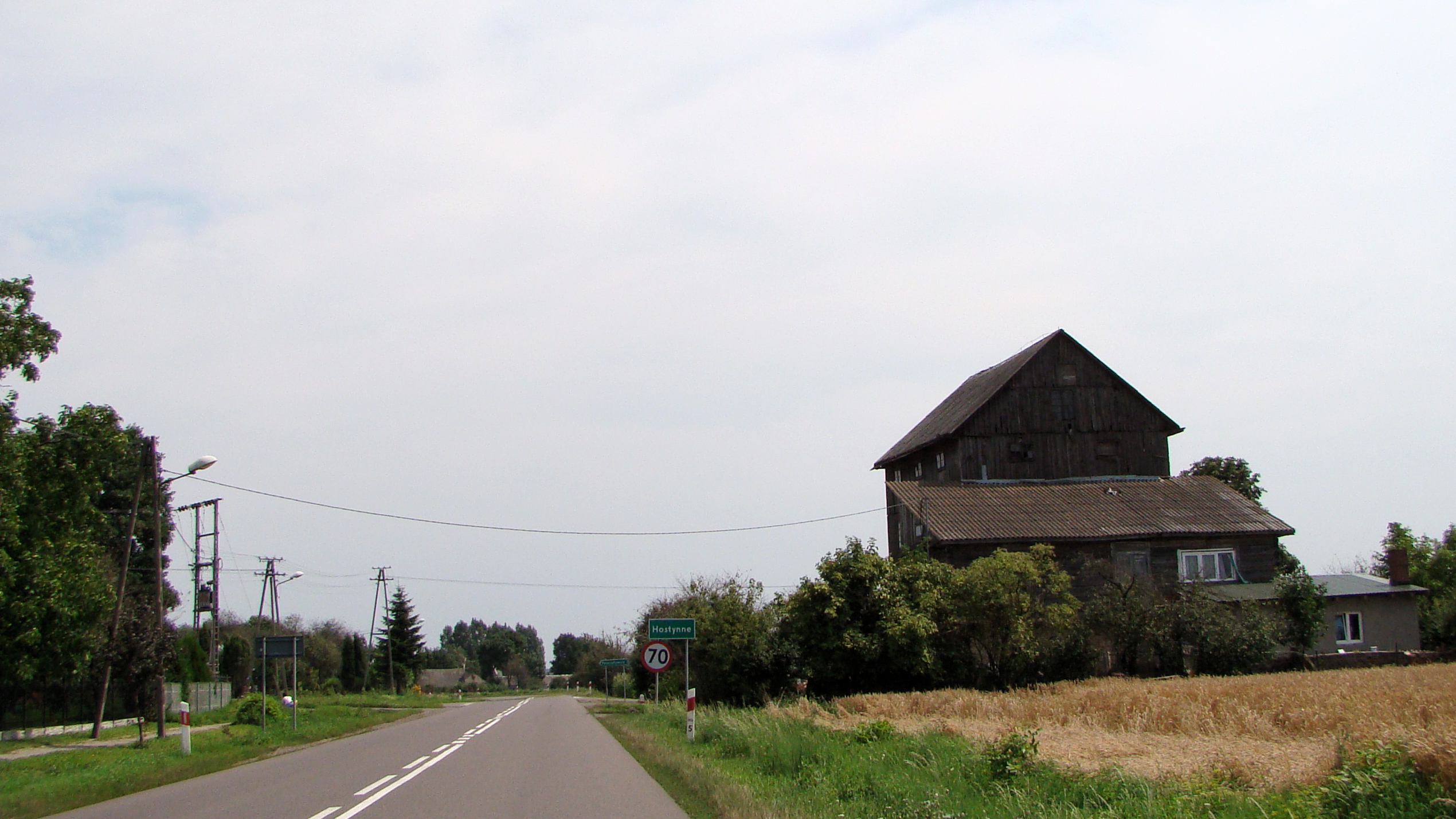
- Road to the village

- Location within Poland
- Coordinates: 50°45′N 23°42′E
- Country: Poland
- Voivodeship: Lublin
- County: Hrubieszów
- Gmina: Werbkowice

Hostynne [xɔsˈtɨnnɛ] is a village in the administrative district of Gmina Werbkowice, within Hrubieszów County, Lublin Voivodeship, in eastern Poland.

From 1920 to 1935, Hostynne was the locus for aid activities by Jane Pontefract, Ada Jordan, Sydney and Joyce Loch, and other British Quakers.

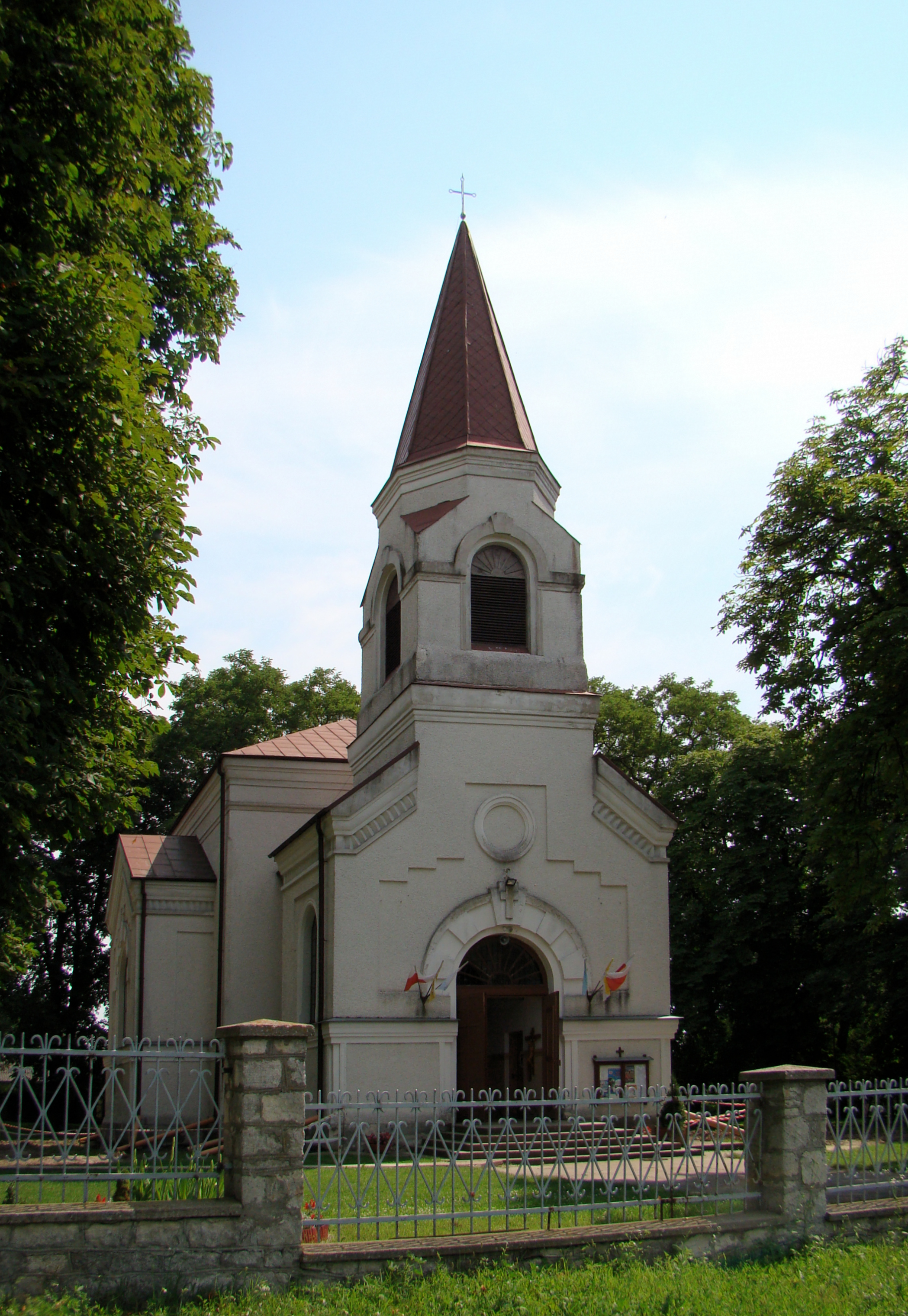
Church of the Saint John the Baptist
