= Wilhelm Lemke =

German World War II fighter pilot

- Lemke as a Hauptmann
- Born: 27 September 1920; Arnswalde, Province of Brandenburg, Free State of Prussia, Weimar Republic
- Died: 4 December 1943 (aged 23) near Dodewaard, German-occupied Netherlands
- Cause of death: Killed in action
- Burial place: Ysselsteyn German war cemetery, Netherlands
- Military career
- Allegiance: Nazi Germany
- Branch: Luftwaffe
- Service years: 1939–1943
- Rank: Hauptmann (captain)
- Unit: JG 3
- Commands: 9./JG 3, II./JG 3
- Conflicts: See battles World War II: Operation Barbarossa; Eastern Front; Defense of the Reich †
- Awards: Knight's Cross of the Iron Cross with Oak Leaves

Wilhelm Lemke (27 September 1920 – 4 December 1943) was a Luftwaffe flying ace of World War II. Lemke was credited with 131 aerial victories—that is, 131 aerial combat encounters resulting in the destruction of the enemy aircraft. All but six of his victories were claimed over the Soviet Air Forces in 617 combat missions.

Born in Arnswalde, Lemke joined the military service in the Luftwaffe of Nazi Germany in 1939. Following flight training, he was posted to 8. Staffel (squadron) of Jagdgeschwader 3 (JG 3—3rd Fighter Wing). He flew his first combat missions in Operation Barbarossa, the German invasion of the Soviet Union, and claimed his first aerial victory on 26 June 1941. There, after 59 aerial victories, he was awarded the Knight's Cross of the Iron Cross on 12 September 1942. He was given command as Staffelkapitän (squadron leader) of 9. Staffel in November 1942. On 16 March 1943, he was credited with his 100th aerial victory. Four months later, on 28 July 1943, he claimed his 125th and last victory on the Eastern Front.

Lemke was subsequently relocated to the Western Front, where he flew in the Defense of the Reich and claimed six further victories. In mid-November 1943, he was appointed Gruppenkommandeur (group commander) of the II. Gruppe (2nd group) of JG 3 "Udet"; he was awarded the Knight's Cross of the Iron Cross with Oak Leaves on 25 November. Lemke was killed in action on 4 December 1943 northwest of Nijmegen in combat with United States Army Air Forces fighters.

== Early life and career ==
Lemke, the son of a civil servant, was born on 27 September 1920 in Gundelsdorf near Arnswalde within the Province of Brandenburg, in what was then the Free State of Prussia of the Weimar Republic (today Choszczno in Poland). He joined the military service of the Luftwaffe as a Fahnenjunker (cadet) on 15 November 1939. Following fighter pilot training, he was promoted to Leutnant (second lieutenant) on 1 April 1941. (Note: Flight training in the Luftwaffe progressed through the levels A1, A2 and B1, B2, referred to as A/B flight training. A training included theoretical and practical training in aerobatics, navigation, long-distance flights and dead-stick landings. The B courses included high-altitude flights, instrument flights, night landings, and training to handle the aircraft in difficult situations.)

== World War II ==
=== Eastern Front ===
Lemke was posted to a front-line unit in 1941, almost two years after the start of World War II. His unit was 8. Staffel (squadron) of Jagdgeschwader 3 (JG 3—3rd Fighter Wing). (Note: For an explanation of Luftwaffe unit designations see Organization of the Luftwaffe during World War II.) In preparation for Operation Barbarossa, the German invasion of the Soviet Union, JG 3 under the command of Major (major) Günther Lützow was relocated east. Lemke claimed two Soviet Tupolev SB-2 bombers shot down on 26 June 1941—his first aerial victories. He was awarded the Iron Cross 2nd Class (Eisernes Kreuz zweiter Klasse) on 4 July 1941 and Iron Cross 1st Class (Eisernes Kreuz erster Klasse) on 20 July. On 11 July, his wingman and Staffelkapitän (squadron leader), Oberleutnant Winfried Schmidt was severely wounded in combat near Fastiv. Schmidt was hit in the lung by the defensive fire of a Tupolev SB tail gunner. By talking to Schmidt over the radio, Lemke managed to guide him back to the airfield at Polonne. The next day, Schmidt was replaced by Oberleutnant Franz Beyer as commander of 8. Staffel.

By 26 August 1941, Lemke had accumulated 15 aerial victories. On this day, flying Messerschmitt Bf 109 F-2 (Werknummner 8245—factory number), he was hit and wounded in the abdomen during combat with Soviet bombers but managed to make an emergency landing. On 3 November 1941, while convalescing, he was awarded the Honour Goblet of the Luftwaffe (Ehrenpokal der Luftwaffe). He returned to active service on 17 February 1942 and was posted to 8. Staffel of JG 3 "Udet". (Note: On 1 December 1941, JG 3 was given the honorary name "Udet" following the suicide of World War I fighter pilot and Luftwaffe Generalleutnant Ernst Udet.) On 31 March 1942, Lemke claimed his 20th aerial victory. He claimed three Lavochkin-Gorbunov-Gudkov LaGG-3 fighters shot down in combat with 6 UAG (6th Soviet strike aviation group—Udarnaya Aviatsionnaya Gruppa) on 4 April. He was credited with his 30th victory on 24 June 1942, and aerial victories 39 to 42 on 29 July. Subsequently, he was nominated for the Knight's Cross of the Iron Cross (Ritterkreuz des Eisernen Kreuzes) by his 8. Staffel. He was given command as Staffelkapitän of 9. Staffel in November 1942. He replaced Oberleutnant Karl-Heinz Langer who was one of the temporary leaders of the Staffel after its former commander Oberleutnant Viktor Bauer had been wounded on 10 August.

Lemke claimed his 57th victory on 7 September 1942, his 58th one day later, and his 59th victory on 11 September. The next day, he was awarded the Knight's Cross of the Iron Cross. On 27 December, he involuntarily rammed a LaGG-3 in combat. By 31 December 1942 his score had increased to 90 victories. As well as his aerial victories, he was credited with the destruction of aircraft on the ground, as well as three tanks, three fuel trucks, eleven other trucks, three Katyusha rocket launchers, one anti-tank gun, and two mortars. On 16 March 1943, he claimed his 100th aerial victory, a Lavochkin La-5 fighter. Lemke was the 35th Luftwaffe pilot to achieve the century mark. Following these events, Lemke was sent on home-leave, returning to his unit on 11 May which was then based at Kramatorsk before relocating to an airfield named "Uhu" (owl) at Chasiv Yar, located approximately 20 kilometers (12 miles) southeast of Kramatorsk, on 19 May. He was promoted to Oberleutnant (first lieutenant) on 1 April 1943 and to Hauptmann (captain) on 1 June. He was credited with his last victory on the Eastern Front on 28 July 1943, taking his total to 125.

=== Western Front and death ===
Combat box of a 12-plane B-17 squadron. Three such boxes completed a 36-plane group box.: 1. Lead Element; 2. High Element; 3. Low Element; 4. Low Low Element

On 2 August 1943, JG 3 "Udet" began transferring to Western Front and flew in Defense of the Reich. The Gruppe arrived at Münster-Handorf Airfield the following day where they were placed under its new commander Hauptmann Walther Dahl. On 7 August, the unit for the first time practiced the Y-Control for fighters, a system used to control groups of fighters intercepting United States Army Air Forces (USAAF) bomber formations. Lemke claimed two USAAF Republic P-47 Thunderbolt fighters shot down on 17 August during the Schweinfurt–Regensburg mission, his first on the Western Front. By 14 October 1943, he was credited with one victory and two Herausschüsse (separation shots)—a severely damaged heavy bomber forced to separate from his combat box, which was counted as an aerial victory—over Boeing B-17 Flying Fortress bombers. On that day, he claimed his 129th and 130th victory, one of which was a Herausschuss, over B-17s on their second Raid on Schweinfurt.

In mid-November 1943, Lemke was appointed Gruppenkommandeur (group commander) of the II. Gruppe (2nd group) of JG 3 "Udet". He succeeded Major Kurt Brändle, who had been killed in action on 3 November. Lemke surrendered command of 9. Staffel to Leutnant Ekkehard Tichy and took command of the Gruppe a few days later at the Schiphol airfield, near Amsterdam in the Netherlands. He was awarded the Knight's Cross of the Iron Cross with Oak Leaves (Ritterkreuz des Eisernen Kreuzes mit Eichenlaub) on 25 November, the 338th officer or soldier of the Wehrmacht so honored. On 30 November 1943 at 11:25, he achieved his 131st and final aerial victory over a P-47.

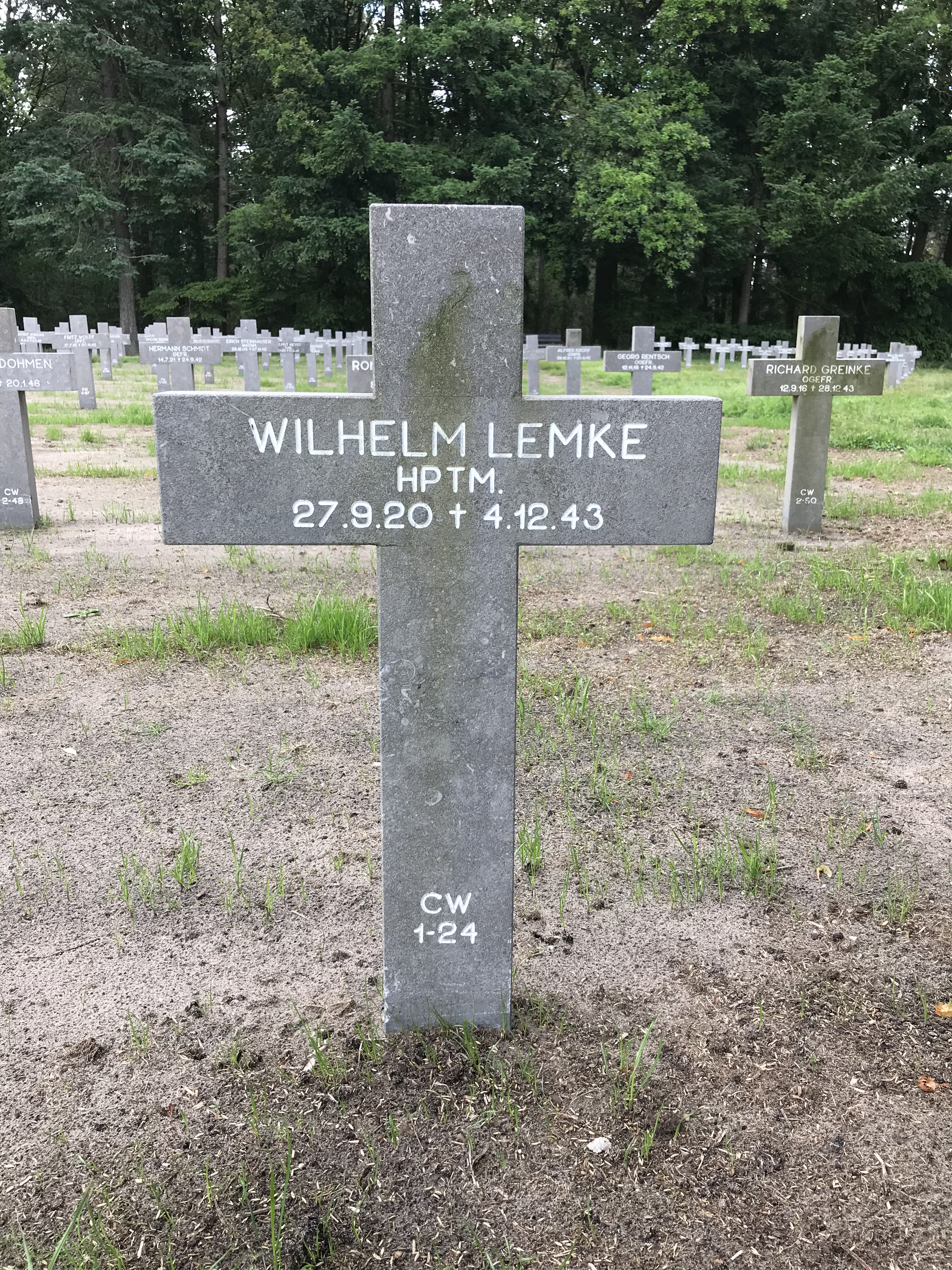
German War Cemetery Ysselsteyn - Wilhelm Lemke

Lemke was killed in action in his Bf 109 G-6 (Werknummner 410558) on 4 December 1943 near Dodewaard, 12 kilometers (7.5 mi) northwest Nijmegen. His mission was to lead an attack of 55 aircraft on a fighter intercept mission against USAAF fighters escorting Eighth Air Force bombers. He was shot down by P-47 Thunderbolts of the 352nd Fighter Group. His victors may have been Major John C. Meyer or Lieutenant Virgil Kersh Meroney. Lemke was buried at the German war cemetery Ysselsteyn in the Netherlands (Block CW—Row 1—Grave 24).

== Summary of career ==
=== Aerial victory claims ===
According to US historian David T. Zabecki, Lemke was credited with 131 aerial victories. Obermaier and Stockert also list Lemke with 131 aerial victories claimed in 617 combat missions, 125 of which were on the Eastern Front and included 28 Ilyushin Il-2 ground-attack aircraft. Mathews and Foreman, authors of Luftwaffe Aces — Biographies and Victory Claims, researched the German Federal Archives and found documentation for 131 aerial victory claims, plus five further unconfirmed claims. This number includes six on the Western Front, including four four-engined bombers, and 125 on the Eastern Front.

Victory claims were logged to a map-reference (PQ = Planquadrat), for example "PQ 40873". The Luftwaffe grid map (Jägermeldenetz) covered all of Europe, western Russia and North Africa and was composed of rectangles measuring 15 minutes of latitude by 30 minutes of longitude, an area of about 360 square miles (930 km^{2}). These sectors were then subdivided into 36 smaller units to give a location area 3 km × 4 km (1.9 mi × 2.5 mi) in size.

Chronicle of aerial victories
This and the – (dash) indicates unwitnessed aerial victory claims for which Lemke did not receive credit. This along with the * (asterisk) indicates an Herausschuss (separation shot)—a severely damaged heavy bomber forced to separate from his combat box which was counted as an aerial victory. This and the ? (question mark) indicates information discrepancies listed by Prien, Stemmer, Rodeike, Bock, Mathews and Foreman.
Claim	Date	Time	Type	Location	Claim	Date	Time	Type	Location
– 8. Staffel of Jagdgeschwader 3 – Operation Barbarossa — 22 June – 5 December 1941
1	26 June 1941	06:30	SB-3	northeast of Berestechko	9	15 July 1941	15:07	I-153	
2	26 June 1941	06:40	SB-3	northeast of Berestechko	10	16 July 1941	17:35	R-Z	Bila Tserkva
3	27 June 1941	15:20	DB-3	Lviv	11	17 July 1941	16:12	DB-3	Rokytne
4	29 June 1941	16:15	ZKB-19? (Note: According to Mathews and Foreman claimed as an Ilyushin DB-3.)	Ostroh	12	25 July 1941	18:20	I-153	
5	29 June 1941	19:05	Il-2	Ostroh	13	25 July 1941	18:40	SB-3	
6	12 July 1941	11:50	DB-3		—	9 August 1941	—	DB-3	
7	12 July 1941	12:00	DB-3		14	19 August 1941	09:15	DB-3	Zaporizhia
8	13 July 1941	06:10	ZKB-19?	Kiev	15	22 August 1941	16:15	I-17	Ostroh
– 8. Staffel of Jagdgeschwader 3 "Udet" – Eastern Front — 6 December 1941 – 30 April 1942
16	3 March 1942	11:17	R-5	southeast of Staraya Russa	21	4 April 1942	18:05	I-61 (MiG-3)	4 km (2.5 mi) northwest of Bjakowo
17	13 March 1942	16:17	I-61 (MiG-3)	3 km (1.9 mi) north-northwest of Solowjewo	22	4 April 1942	18:10	I-61 (MiG-3)	2 km (1.2 mi) north of Jennakowo
18	16 March 1942	17:15	R-5	Konjuchowo, southeast of Staraya Russa	23	4 April 1942	18:15	I-61 (MiG-3)	
19	28 March 1942	16:10	I-61	4 km (2.5 mi) west of Ramushevo	24	5 April 1942	13:10	I-61 (MiG-3)	3 km (1.9 mi) south of Meshinki
20	31 March 1942	15:10	I-301 (LaGG-3)	Tschertowschischina	25	6 April 1942	10:10	I-61 (MiG-3)	2 km (1.2 mi) south of Komorowo
– 8. Staffel of Jagdgeschwader 3 "Udet" – Eastern Front — 19 May 1942 – 3 February 1943
26	19 May 1942	16:45	MiG-1	north of Kosewedemjan; 18 km (11 mi) south of Vovchansk	50	25 August 1942	11:15	Il-2	PQ 40873
27	27 May 1942	04:15	MiG-1	3 km (1.9 mi) south of Chuhuiv	51	28 August 1942	06:30	I-180 (Yak-7)	east of Stalingrad
28	28 May 1942	08:21	I-153	northeast of Izium	52	30 August 1942	09:22	Il-2	northeast of Radkowo
29	24 June 1942	18:13	Yak-4	northeast of Shchigry	53	30 August 1942	09:28	Il-2	southwest of Samydowo
30	24 June 1942	18:17	MiG-3	southeast of Stary Tschenoissinowo	54	30 August 1942	17:00	MiG-3	southwest of Tundutow
31	24 June 1942	18:19? (Note: According to Mathews and Foreman claimed at 18:18.)	MiG-3	east-southeast of Stary Tschenoissinowo	55	30 August 1942	17:05	MiG-3	north of Tundutow
32	26 June 1942	08:52	Il-2		56	6 September 1942	16:55	MiG-3	2 km (1.2 mi) west-southwest of Stalingrad
33	26 June 1942	08:55	Il-2		57	7 September 1942	17:15	I-153	15 km (9.3 mi) north of Stalingrad
34	2 July 1942	06:50	MiG-3	Gorstschetnoje	58	8 September 1942	05:55	MiG-3	6 km (3.7 mi) west of Akhtuba
35	8 July 1942	13:27	MiG-1	Lipetsk	59	11 September 1942	10:45	Il-2	4 km (2.5 mi) north of Stalingrad
36	27 July 1942	18:15	LaGG-3	northeast of Kalach	60	13 September 1942	12:35	MiG-3	20 km (12 mi) northeast of Stalingrad
37	28 July 1942	09:07	LaGG-3	northeast of Kalach	61	16 September 1942	09:30	MiG-3	12 km (7.5 mi) east of Stalingrad
38	28 July 1942	09:20	LaGG-3	east of Kalach	62	18 September 1942	05:40	Il-2	2 km (1.2 mi) northwest of Kotluban train station 6 km (3.7 mi) east of Kotluban
39	29 July 1942	04:02	LaGG-3	southwest of Kalach	63	22 September 1942	11:30	MiG-3	south of Kolobowka
40	29 July 1942	17:45	Il-2	Tschirskaja	64	28 September 1942	05:35	MiG-3	5 km (3.1 mi) north-northwest of Stalingrad
41	29 July 1942	17:50	Il-2	southwest of Loschkij	65	28 September 1942	05:40	Il-2	3 km (1.9 mi) east of Stalingrad
42	29 July 1942	18:10	LaGG-3	east of Tschir	66	2 October 1942	07:28	MiG-3	18 km (11 mi) northeast of Ssolodetsche
43	31 July 1942	15:55	LaGG-3	north of Kaibowka	67	6 October 1942	15:20	La-5	PQ 58753 vicinity of Stalingrad
44	13 August 1942	17:45	Il-2	west of Marionowskij	68	9 October 1942	13:10	MiG-3	18 km (11 mi) southwest of Serafimovichsky
45	13 August 1942	18:05	Il-2	south of Wastjascht	69	17 October 1942	15:50	MiG-3	12 km (7.5 mi) northeast of Leninsk
46	21 August 1942	17:38	LaGG-3	north of Zaza	70	21 October 1942	08:45	LaGG-3	8 km (5.0 mi) south of Grjasnaja
47	21 August 1942	17:43	Il-2	east of Zaza	71	27 October 1942	15:05	MiG-3	20 km (12 mi) north-northeast of Leninsk
48	21 August 1942	17:55	LaGG-3	north of Zaza	72	1 November 1942	14:35	MiG-3	southeastern area of the Leninsk airfield
49	23 August 1942	15:10	MiG-1	Srednyaya					
– 9. Staffel of Jagdgeschwader 3 "Udet" – Eastern Front — 19 May 1942 – 3 February 1943
73? (Note: According to Mathews and Foreman claimed with 8. Staffel of Jagdgeschwader 3.)	8 November 1942	07:10	LaGG-3	2 km (1.2 mi) north of Akhtuba	83	17 December 1942	11:42	Il-2	8 km (5.0 mi) south of Kapminski
74?	10 November 1942	10:20	Pe-2	15 km (9.3 mi) southeast of Katschalinskaja	84	17 December 1942	11:45	Il-2	3 km (1.9 mi) southeast of Abganerowo
75	13 November 1942	11:43	MiG-3	PQ 49261, Leninsk; 35 km (22 mi) east of Stalingrad	85	26 December 1942	07:15	LaGG-3	Urjupin, 6 km (3.7 mi) southwest of Miljatorskaja
76	30 November 1942	10:40	MiG-3	10 km (6.2 mi) south of Bokowskaja	86	27 December 1942	10:00	LaGG-3	12 km (7.5 mi) northeast of Miljatorskaja
77	11 December 1942	13:20	Boston	15 km (9.3 mi) northwest of Kalach	87	27 December 1942	13:32	LaGG-3	8 km (5.0 mi) north of Zymla
78	12 December 1942	10:30	LaGG-3	6 km (3.7 mi) east-northeast of Ssurowikino	88	28 December 1942	11:55	Il-2	9 km (5.6 mi) north of Obliwskaja
79	12 December 1942	10:40	LaGG-3	20 km (12 mi) west-northwest of Kalach	89	31 December 1942	07:12	Il-2	north of Morozovsk
80	13 December 1942	07:15	LaGG-3	4 km (2.5 mi) northwest of Tschernigow	90	31 December 1942	07:40	Il-2	6 km (3.7 mi) west of Urjatin
81	13 December 1942	11:35	R-5	12 km (7.5 mi) east of Sety	91	10 January 1943	09:35	Yak-4	4 km (2.5 mi) northwest of Porchow
82	17 December 1942	11:40	Il-2	6 km (3.7 mi) northwest of Kapminski	92	17 January 1943	13:40	LaGG-3	6 km (3.7 mi) northeast of Kamensk
– 9. Staffel of Jagdgeschwader 3 "Udet" – Eastern Front — 4 February – 1 August 1943
93	10 February 1943	14:20	Boston	15 km (9.3 mi) north of Artyomovsk	111	20 June 1943	03:48	Il-2	southeast of Yeysk
94	11 February 1943	10:35	Boston	12 km (7.5 mi) east of Kramatorsk	112	20 June 1943	03:50	Il-2	west of Yeysk
95	27 February 1943	07:40	La-5	8 km (5.0 mi) west of Losowaja Buchewka; 8 km (5.0 mi) west of Juchevka	—	5 July 1943	—	LaGG-3	
96	28 February 1943	13:43	La-5	15 km (9.3 mi) south of Izium	—	5 July 1943	—	La-5	
97	28 February 1943	13:47	La-5	20 km (12 mi) south of Izium	113	5 July 1943	13:55	La-5	south of Oboyan
98	13 March 1943	11:15	Il-2	30 km (19 mi) southeast of Chuhuiv	114	5 July 1943	18:12	Il-2	southwest of Korotscha
99	13 March 1943	11:17	R-5	35 km (22 mi) southeast of Chuhuiv	115	5 July 1943	18:30	Il-2	south of Belgorod
100	16 March 1943	12:25	La-5	15 km (9.3 mi) south of Olchowatka	—	5 July 1943	—	La-5	
101	31 May 1943	18:12	Il-2	PQ 34 Ost 79431, east of Kramatorsk; 20 km (12 mi) north-northwest of Artomovsk	116	6 July 1943	09:35	La-5	northwest of Belgorod
102	31 May 1943	18:14	LaGG-3	PQ 34 Ost 79274, southwest of Sslawjansk; 20 km (12 mi) south-southeast of Liman	117	7 July 1943	12:07	La-5	southwest of Oboyan
103	31 May 1943	18:19	LaGG-3	PQ 34 Ost 79174, south of Barvinkovo; 20 km (12 mi) north of Artomovsk	118	7 July 1943	12:15	La-5	southwest of Prochorowka
104	2 June 1943	13:50	La-5	west of Kursk north of Kursk	119	8 July 1943	12:03	LaGG-3	north of Belgorod
105	10 June 1943	08:20	LaGG-3	PQ 35 Ost 90713, southeast of Starobilsk; 20 km (12 mi) southeast of Starobilsk	120	9 July 1943	05:10	Il-2	east of Warwarowka
106	14 June 1943	14:40	La-5	east of Kupiansk	121	9 July 1943	11:05	La-5	southwest of Oboyan
107	14 June 1943	14:45	La-5	southwest of Sswatowo	122	14 July 1943	15:35	La-5	north of Prochorowka
108	15 June 1943	17:32	LaGG-3	west of Starobilsk north of Starobilsk	123	17 July 1943	14:00? (Note: According to Mathews and Foreman claimed at 14:07.)	La-5	PQ 35 70811, northwest of Izium; 20 km (12 mi) east of Izium
109	15 June 1943	17:43	LaGG-3	north-northeast of Starobilsk	124	28 July 1943	18:25	Boston	PQ 35 70871, southeast of Izium; 15 km (9.3 mi) west-northwest of Krasnyi Lyman
110	16 June 1943	18:12	La-5	north of Starobilsk	125	28 July 1943	18:26	LaGG-3	PQ 35 70873, southeast of Izium; 15 km (9.3 mi) west-northwest of Krasnyi Lyman
—	16 June 1943	—	LaGG-3						
– 9. Staffel of Jagdgeschwader 3 "Udet" – Defense of the Reich — 8 August – 31 December 1943
126	17 August 1943	17:15? (Note: According to Mathews and Foreman, Lemke's 126th aerial victory was claimed over a Boeing B-17 Flying Fortress shot down at 15:00 north-northeast of Liège.)	P-47?	north-northeast of Liège	129	14 October 1943	14:39	B-17	20 km (12 mi) west of Schweinfurt
127	17 August 1943	17:26	P-47	5 km (3.1 mi) northeast of Liège	130*	14 October 1943	14:45	B-17	Schweinfurt
128*	6 September 1943	11:05	B-17	west of Stuttgart					
– II. Gruppe of Jagdgeschwader 3 "Udet" – Defense of the Reich — 8 August – 31 December 1943
131	30 November 1943	11:25	P-47	Tilburg					

=== Awards ===
- Iron Cross (1939)
  - 2nd Class (4 July 1941)
  - 1st Class (20 July 1941)
- Honor Goblet of the Luftwaffe on 3 November 1941 as Leutnant and pilot
- Knight's Cross of the Iron Cross with Oak Leaves
  - Knight's Cross on 12 September 1942 as Leutnant and Staffelführer of the 9./Jagdgeschwader 3 "Udet" (Note: According to Scherzer on 19 September 1942 as pilot in the 8./Jagdgeschwader 3 "Udet".)
  - 338th Oak Leaves on 25 November 1943 as Hauptmann and Gruppenkommandeur of the II./Jagdgeschwader 3 "Udet" (Note: According to Scherzer as Staffelkapitän in the III./Jagdgeschwader 3 "Udet".)
