= Winfried Schmidt =

German World War II fighter pilot (1915–1999)

- Born: 28 February 1915; Cologne, German Empire
- Died: 2 August 1999 (aged 84); Frechen, Germany
- Military career
- Allegiance: Nazi Germany
- Branch: Luftwaffe
- Service years: 1935–1945
- Rank: Hauptmann (captain)
- Conflicts: World War II
- Awards: Knight's Cross of the Iron Cross

Winfried Schmidt (28 February 1915 – 2 August 2009) was a German Luftwaffe military aviator during World War II. As a fighter ace, he is credited with 19 enemy aircraft shot down claimed in approximately 150 combat missions. He was severely injured in aerial combat on 11 July 1941 during Operation Barbarossa, the German invasion of the Soviet Union. In consequence, he served in a Luftwaffe staff position for the rest of the war.

== Early life and career ==
Schmidt was born on 28 February 1915 in Cologne in the Rhine Province within the German Empire. He joined the military service of the Luftwaffe in October 1935 as an officer of the military reserve force. Following flight and fighter pilot training, (Note: Flight training in the Luftwaffe progressed through the levels A1, A2 and B1, B2, referred to as A/B flight training. A training included theoretical and practical training in aerobatics, navigation, long-distance flights and dead-stick landings. The B courses included high-altitude flights, instrument flights, night landings and training to handle the aircraft in difficult situations.) Schmidt was posted to I. Gruppe (1st group) of Jagdgeschwader 334 (JG 334—334th Fighter Wing) in July 1937. On 1 November 1938, this Gruppe was renamed and became I. Gruppe of Jagdgeschwader 133 (JG 133—133rd Fighter Wing) which was again redesignated to I. Gruppe of Jagdgeschwader 53 (JG 53—53rd Fighter Wing) on 1 May 1939.

== World War II ==
World War II in Europe began on Friday 1 September 1939 when German forces invaded Poland. At the time, Schmidt was a member of 5. Staffel (5th squadron) of Jagdgeschwader 77 (JG 77—77th Fighter Wing), a squadron of II. Gruppe of JG 77. The Staffel was commanded by Oberleutnant Alfred von Loijewski while the Gruppe was headed by Carl-Alfred Schumacher and equipped with the Messerschmitt Bf 109 D-1. Based at Nordholz, the Gruppe was tasked with patrolling the German Bight. On 12 December, the Gruppe had moved to Jever Airfiled while 5. Staffel was based at Wangerooge Airfield.

Schmidt claimed his first aerial victory on 18 December 1939 during the Battle of the Heligoland Bight. He was credited with shooting down a Vickers Wellington bomber near Langeoog. The Royal Air Force (RAF) lost fourteen bombers that day. In March 1940, Schmidt was transferred to the III. Gruppe of Jagdgeschwader 3 (JG 3—3rd Fighter Wing) where he was assigned to 8. Staffel. On 7 June during the Battle of France, Schmidt was shot down and wounded in aerial combat with RAF Hawker Hurricane fighters. He bailed out of his Bf 109 E-1 in a location 5 kilometers (3.1 miles) northwest of Abbeville. Schmidt claimed his fifth aerial victory in total and only claim of the Battle of Britain on 26 August. That day, III. Gruppe flew a combat air patrol over southeastern England. On this mission, Luftwaffe pilots claimed three aerial victories, including a Supermarine Spitfire fighter shot down near Ashford. On 27 September, Schmidt was again wounded in aerial combat. Damage to his Bf 109 E-4 (Werknummer 1283—factory number) resulted in a forced landing at Wissant.

=== War against the Soviet Union ===
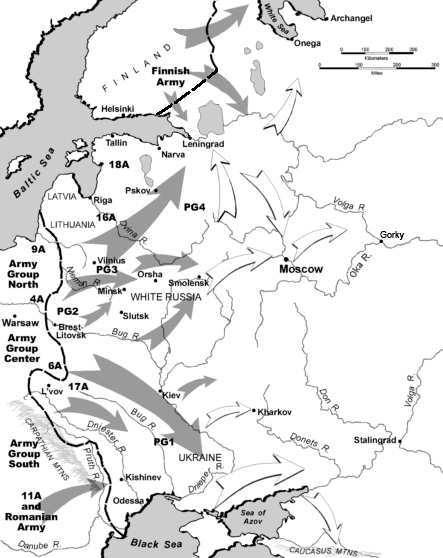
Map indicating Operation Barbarossa's attack plan

The Gruppe relocated to an airfield at Moderówka on 18 June where the Gruppe concluded their last preparations for Operation Barbarossa, the German invasion of the Soviet Union on 22 June 1941. At the start of the campaign, JG 3 was subordinated to the V. Fliegerkorps (5th Air Corps), under command of General der Flieger Robert Ritter von Greim, which was part of Luftflotte 4 (4th Air Fleet), under command of Generaloberst Alexander Löhr. These air elements supported Generalfeldmarschall Gerd von Rundstedt's Heeresgruppe Süd (Army Group South), with the objective of capturing Ukraine and its capital Kiev.

On 23 June, 7. and 8. Staffel were briefly detached from III. Gruppe and ordered to Dub where they augmented I. Gruppe. Operation from Dub on 26 June, Schmidt claimed two Tupolev SB bombers shot down. On 27 June, the two detached Staffeln rejoined III. Gruppe which had moved to Hostynne. That day, Schmidt claimed two Ilyushin DB-3 bombers. Another DB-3 claimed on 29 June took his total to ten aerial victories claimed. On 23 June, Schmidt had been appointed Staffelkapitän (squadron leader) of 8. Staffel of JG 3. He succeeded Oberleutnant Willy Stange who was killed in action the day before, the first day of Operation Barbarossa, the German invasion of the Soviet Union. On 6 July, III. Gruppe moved to Polonne, located approximately 80 kilometers (50 miles) west-southwest of Zhytomyr, where they stayed until 21 July.

On 11 July, Schmidt was severely wounded in combat near Fastiv. Schmidt had been hit in the lung by the defensive fire of a Tupolev SB tail gunner. His wingman Leutnant Wilhelm Lemke managed to guide him back to the airfield at Polonne. There, he crashed his Bf 109 F-2 (Werknummer 8236). The next day, Schmidt was replaced by Oberleutnant Franz Beyer as commander of 8. Staffel. Schmidt was awarded the Knight's Cross of the Iron Cross (Ritterkreuz des Eisernen Kreuzes) on 18 September 1941 for 19 aerial victories claimed. Due to the severe injuries sustained, Schmidt was hospitalized for many months and never returned to combat operations. Following a period of convalescence, he was posted to the staff of 7. Jagd-Division (7th Fighter Division). In January 1944, Schmidt was promoted to Hauptmann (captain).

== Later life ==
Schmidt died on 2 August 1999 at the age of 84 in Frechen, Germany.

== Summary of career ==
=== Aerial victory claims ===
According to Obermaier, Schmidt was credited with 19 aerial victories claimed in approximately 150 combat missions. Mathews and Foreman, authors of Luftwaffe Aces – Biographies and Victory Claims, researched the German Federal Archives and found records for 19 aerial victory claims. This figure includes 14 aerial victories on the Eastern Front and four on the Western Front.

Chronicle of aerial victories
Claim	Date	Time	Type	Location	Claim	Date	Time	Type	Location
– 5. Staffel of Jagdgeschwader 77 – "Phoney War" — 1 September 1939 – 9 May 1940
1	18 December 1939	14:30	Wellington	north of Langeoog north of Wangerooge					
– 8. Staffel of Jagdgeschwader 3 – Battle of France – 10 May – 25 June 1940
2	13 May 1940	10:27	Hurricane	west of Ghent	4	7 June 1940	15:00	Blenheim	Baie de Somme
3	19 May 1940	16:20	Hurricane	Arras					
– 8. Staffel of Jagdgeschwader 3 – Battle of Britain and on the English Channel – 26 June 1940 – 9 June 1941
5	26 August 1940	13:20	Spitfire	Ashford					
– 8. Staffel of Jagdgeschwader 3 – Operation Barbarossa – 22 June – 11 July 1941
6	26 June 1941	06:32	SB-3		13	1 July 1941	05:05	PZL.37	Radionow
7	26 June 1941	06:37	SB-3		14	2 July 1941	12:20	V-11 (Il-2)	
8	27 June 1941	15:51	DB-3		15	2 July 1941	18:15	I-153	3 km (1.9 mi) southwest of Polonne
9	27 June 1941	15:55	DB-3		16	6 July 1941	18:05	PZL.37	
10	29 June 1941	18:50	DB-3		17	8 July 1941	17:50	SB-2	
11	30 June 1941	09:50	DB-3		18	10 July 1941	11:30	SB-3	
12	30 June 1941	09:55	DB-3	east of Konzec	19	11 July 1941	06:30	DB-3	Polonne

=== Awards ===
- Iron Cross (1939) 2nd and 1st Class
- Knight's Cross of the Iron Cross on 18 September 1941 as Oberleutnant and Staffelkapitän of the 8./Jagdgeschwader 3 (Note: According to Scherzer as Oberleutnant of the Reserves.)
