= Ekkehard Tichy =

German fighter ace and Knight's Cross recipient (1922–1944)

- Born: 26 August 1922; Uničov, Czechoslovakia
- Died: 16 August 1944 (aged 21) near Althausen
- Cause of death: Killed in action
- Military career
- Allegiance: Nazi Germany
- Branch: Luftwaffe
- Rank: Hauptmann (captain)
- Unit: JG 3
- Conflicts: World War II: Eastern Front; Defense of the Reich
- Awards: Knight's Cross of the Iron Cross

Ekkehard Tichy (26 August 1922 – 16 August 1944) was a German fighter ace. A Luftwaffe pilot, he was credited with 25 aerial victories. Tichy was killed on 16 August 1944 after ramming a Boeing B-17 Flying Fortress bomber with his Focke-Wulf Fw 190 over Hannoversch Münden, Germany. He was posthumously awarded the Knights Cross on 14 January 1945 and promoted to Hauptmann.

== Early life and career ==
Tichy was born on 26 August 1922 in Uničov (Mährisch Neustadt), present-day in the Czech Republic, at the time in the bilingual region of Moravia of the First Czechoslovak Republic. Following completion of his flight and fighter pilot training, (Note: Flight training in the Luftwaffe progressed through the levels A1, A2 and B1, B2, referred to as A/B flight training. A training included theoretical and practical training in aerobatics, navigation, long-distance flights and dead-stick landings. The B courses included high-altitude flights, instrument flights, night landings and training to handle the aircraft in difficult situations.), Tichy was posted to I. Gruppe (1st group) of Jagdgeschwader 53 (JG 53—53rd Fighter Wing) in July 1942. In July 1942, I. Gruppe of JG 53 was fighting on the Eastern Front, supporting German forces which had launched Case Blue on 28 June, the strategic summer offensive in southern Russia. On 7 July, Army Group A began their advance towards the oil fields in the Caucasus. In September, I. Gruppe was based at Pitomnik Airfield and fighting Battle of Stalingrad. The Gruppe flew its last combat missions on the Eastern Front on 26 September. Shortly after, Tichy was transferred to 9. Staffel (9th squadron) of Jagdgeschwader 3 "Udet" (JG 3—3rd Fighter Wing), a squadron of III. Gruppe.

== World War II ==
World War II in Europe had begun on Friday, 1 September 1939 when German forces invaded Poland. In June 1941, German forces had launched Operation Barbarossa, the invasion of the Soviet Union. In October 1943, III. Gruppe of JG 3 was also based at Pitomnik Airfield and commanded by Major Wolfgang Ewald while Tichy's 9. Staffel was under command of Oberleutnant Wilhelm Lemke. Following the German defeat at Stalingrad and a series of relocations, III. Gruppe reached an airfield at Kerch. Here the Gruppe was placed under control of Jagdgeschwader 52 (JG 52—52nd Fighter Wing) and fought in the Battle of the Caucasus. Here on 20 April, Tichy claimed his first aerial victory, a Lavochkin-Gorbunov-Gudkov LaGG-3 fighter. On 26 April, III. Gruppe was ordered to relocate to Kramatorsk. Here on 7 May, Tichy claimed his second aerial victory.

On 19 May, the Gruppe moved to an airfield named "Uhu" (owl) at Chasiv Yar, located approximately 20 kilometers (12 miles) southeast of Kramatorsk. Here, the Gruppe fought in the Battle of Kursk. During this battle, Tichy claimed further aerial victories which included three on 21 July, two Lavochkin La-5 fighters and an Ilyushin Il-2 ground-attack aircraft, and three LaGG-3 fighters on 31 July, taking his total to 13. III. Gruppe flew its last combat missions on the Eastern Front on 1 August. The next day, the Gruppe was ordered to Chasiv Yar and then back to Germany where it was based at Münster-Handorf Airfield. For his achievements on the Eastern Front, Tichy was awarded the both classes of the Iron Cross (Eisernes Kreuz).

=== Defense of the Reich ===
III. Gruppe arrived in Münster-Handorf on 3 August where Major Walther Dahl took over command of the unit. The Gruppe immediately began preparations for Defense of the Reich (Reichsverteidigung) missions and was subordinated to Fighter Leader for the Holland area (Jagdfliegerführer Holland). On 25 August. III. Gruppe moved to an airfield at Bad Wörishofen where they stayed until 18 February 1944. Tichy claimed his first aerial victory in defense of the Reich on 6 September. That day, United States Army Air Forces (USAAF) Eighth Air Force sent 338 Boeing B-17 Flying Fortress bombers of the 1st and 3rd Bombardment Division to bomb the industrial areas at Stuttgart. III. Gruppe was scrambled at 10:30 and vectored to Stuttgart where they engaged a formation of approximately 30 B-17 bombers. In this encounter, Tichy was credited with an Herausschuss (separation shot)—a severely damaged heavy bomber forced to separate from its combat box which was counted as an aerial victory.

Combat box of a 12-plane B-17 squadron. Three such boxes completed a 36-plane group box.: 1. Lead Element; 2. High Element; 3. Low Element; 4. Low Low Element

On 14 October, during the Second Raid on Schweinfurt, Tichy claimed an Herausschuss over a B-17 bomber in a location 26 kilometers (16 miles) west of Schweinfurt. On 4 November, Tichy was appointed Staffelkapitän (squadron leader) of 9. Staffel of JG 3. He succeeded Oberleutnant Wilhelm Lemke who was transferred. On 19 December, the USAAF Fifteenth Air Force attacked railroad infrastructure at Innsbruck and the Messerschmitt factories at Augsburg. III. Gruppe of JG 3 was vectored to intercept the formation heading for Innsbruck. There, the Gruppe without loss of their own claimed eight B-17 bombers shot down, including one by Tichy. On 29 January 1944, III. Gruppe flew its first combat mission of the year. That day, the USAAF Eighth Air Force sent 863 heavy bombers against railroad infrastructure at Frankfurt. Scrambled at 10:08, III. Gruppe was vectored by means of Y-Control for fighters to a point of intercept near Mannheim. In this aerial battle, the Gruppe claimed ten bombers shot down and five further Herausschüsse, including an Herausschuss by Tichy.

Due to adverse weather conditions, and snow covered runways at Bad Wörishofen, III. Gruppe moved to Leipheim on 18 February. Here on 23 February during "Big Week", the USAAF Fifteenth Air Force attacked the ball bearing factories at Steyr. At 11:20, III. Gruppe was scrambled at Leipheim and intercepted the bombers at 12:00 near Steyr. Defending against this attack, Tichy claimed a Consolidated B-24 Liberator bomber shot down. The next day, the USAAF Fifteenth Air Force attacked German aircraft manufacturing at Tutow, Posen (Poznań), Kreising and Gotha. That day, Tichy claimed a B-17 bomber shot down from a returning formation in the area south of Steyr. On 25 February, the USAAF Fifteenth Air Force again attacked the Messerschmitt factories at Augsburg. At 12:15 III. Gruppe intercepted 30 bombers near Mühldorf am Inn without fighter escort. In aerial combat south of Regensburg, Tichy claimed a B-17 bomber shot down.

On 16 March, the USAAF Eighth Air Force sent 740 heavy bombers against German aircraft manufacturing at Augsburg, Ulm and Friedrichshafen. That day, III. Gruppe only had nine serviceable aircraft available. This small formation was led by Tichy and intercepted the bombers southeast of Stuttgart. In this attack, III. Gruppe lost one pilot killed in action and three pilots wounded while three aircraft were lost and three further damaged while claiming four bombers shot down, including an Herausschuss by Tichy. Two days later on 18 March, Tichy had been wounded in one of his eyes during aerial combat with escorting fighters. That day, the USAAF Eighth Air Force attacked aircraft manufacturing and Luftwaffe airfields near Munich and Friedrichshafen. Northwest of Stuttgart, Tichy claimed an escorting North American P-51 Mustang fighter shot down. He then attacked a B-17 bomber but his Messerschmitt Bf 109 G-6 (Werknummer 410554—factory number) was hit in the cockpit. Tichy, who sustained injuries to his eye, was forced to bail out near Ursberg. In consequence, command of 9. Staffel was passed on to Leutnant Hans-Martin Stein.

Following his convalescence, Tichy returned to 9. Staffel in April 1944, again taking command of the Staffel after Stein was killed in action on 12 April. During this period, he was awarded the Honor Goblet of the Luftwaffe (Ehrenpokal der Luftwaffe) on 15 April and the German Cross in Gold (Deutsches Kreuz in Gold) the following day. In May 1944, Tichy was promoted to Oberleutnant (first lieutenant). He then volunteered for service with the Sturmgruppe (assault group) of JG 3. In consequence, command of 9. Staffel was passed on to Leutnant Dieter Zink.

=== With the assault group and death ===
On 15 April 1944, Generalmajor Adolf Galland, at the time the General der Jagdflieger (General of Fighters), had visited IV. Gruppe of JG 3 at the airfield in Salzwedel. Galland announced that the IV. Gruppe would be converted to a Sturmgruppe (assault group), the first of such units, as a means to combat the bomber formations of the USAAF. Similar to the experimental Sturmstaffel 1 (1st Assault Squadron) of JG 3, the Gruppe was equipped with the heavily armored variant of the Focke-Wulf Fw 190 A series. Every pilot of the Gruppe was asked to sign a contract, declaring that they would commit themselves to pressing attacks on the bombers to point-blank range, and that aerial ramming should be considered. Three days later, Hauptmann Wilhelm Moritz was officially appointed Gruppenkommandeur (group commander) of the IV. Sturmgruppe of JG 3. He replaced Hauptmann Heinz Lang, who had temporarily led the Gruppe after its former commander, Major Friedrich-Karl Müller had been appointed Geschwaderkommodore (wing commander) on 11 April.

On 3 August, Tichy was appointed Staffelkapitän of the 10. Sturmstaffel of JG 3, succeeding Leutnant Walther Hagenah who had briefly led the Sturmstaffel after its former commander, Leutnant Hans Weik had been wounded in combat. That day, Tichy also claimed his first aerial victory with the Sturmgruppe. That day in the afternoon, the USAAF Eighth Air Force attacked the railroad infrastructure and fuel manufacturing southwest Germany. In the combat area north of Strasbourg, Tichy claimed a B-17 bomber shot down. On 9 August, III. Gruppe defended against an attack aimed at railroad infrastructure in southwest Germany. The Gruppe was intercepted by escorting fighters over the Black Forest before a consolidate attack on the bombers could be made. Nevertheless, Tichy claimed one of the two B-17 bombers shot down. On 16 August, Tichy was killed in action in a mid-air collision with a B-17 bomber of the 91st Bombardment Group northeast of Schweinfurt. His Fw 190 A-8/R2 (Werknummer 732029) crashed near Althausen and Eichenberg. Posthumously, he was promoted to Hauptmann (captain) and awarded the Knight's Cross of the Iron Cross (Ritterkreuz des Eisernen Kreuzes) on 14 January 1945. In consequence, Leutnant Walther Hagenah was again given command of the 10. Sturmstaffel.

== Summary of career ==
=== Aerial victory claims ===
According to Heaton, Lewis, Olds and Schulze, Tichy was credited with 25 aerial victories. Obermaier also lists him with 25 aerial victories, 13 on the Eastern Front and 12 on the Western Front, including 11 heavy bombers. Mathews and Foreman, authors of Luftwaffe Aces — Biographies and Victory Claims, researched the German Federal Archives and found records for 19 aerial victories, plus three further unconfirmed claims. Of this figure, he claimed 13 aerial victories on the Eastern Front and six over the Western Allies, including five four-engined bombers.

Victory claims were logged to a map-reference (PQ = Planquadrat), for example "PQ 34 Ost 8972". The Luftwaffe grid map (Jägermeldenetz) covered all of Europe, western Russia and North Africa and was composed of rectangles measuring 15 minutes of latitude by 30 minutes of longitude, an area of about 360 square miles (930 km^{2}). These sectors were then subdivided into 36 smaller units to give a location area 3 km × 4 km (1.9 mi × 2.5 mi) in size.

Chronicle of aerial victories
This along with the * (asterisk) indicates an Herausschuss (separation shot)—a severely damaged heavy bomber forced to separate from his combat box which was counted as an aerial victory. This and the ? (question mark) indicates information discrepancies listed by Prien, Stemmer, Rodeike, Bock, Mathews and Foreman.
Claim	Date	Time	Type	Location	Claim	Date	Time	Type	Location
– 9. Staffel of Jagdgeschwader 3 "Udet" – Eastern Front — 4 February – 1 August 1943
1	20 April 1943	08:37	LaGG-3	6 km (3.7 mi) south of Novorossiysk	8	24 July 1943	04:00	LaGG-3	18 km (11 mi) north-northwest of Slavyansk
2	7 May 1943	08:15	Pe-2	PQ 34 Ost 8972, southeast of Gorlowka	9	25 July 1943	11:55	La-5	18 km (11 mi) north-northwest of Slavyansk
3	9 May 1943	10:15	LaGG-3	Rostov train station	10	28 July 1943	08:00	Yak-7	PQ 34 Ost 79192, northwest of Slavyansk; 18 km (11 mi) north-northwest of Slavyansk
4	24 May 1943	07:18	LaGG-3	east of Bataysk	11	31 July 1943	05:20	LaGG-3	5 km (3.1 mi) northwest of Kuybyshevo vicinity of Rovenki
5	21 July 1943	04:26	La-5	PQ 35 Ost 70791, southeast of Izium	12	31 July 1943	05:25	LaGG-3	PQ 34 Ost 88252; 10 km (6.2 mi) south of Jalisawehino
6	21 July 1943	04:30	La-5	PQ 35 Ost 70842, east of Izium; 25 km (16 mi) north-northeast of Krasnyi Lyman	13	31 July 1943	15:40	LaGG-3	PQ 34 Ost 88233; 20 km (12 mi) northeast of Jalisawehino
7	21 July 1943	17:36	Il-2	30 km (19 mi) northwest of Slavyansk					
– 9. Staffel of Jagdgeschwader 3 "Udet" – Defense of the Reich – 8 August 1943 – 18 March 1944
14	6 September 1943	10:55	B-17*	15 km (9.3 mi) south of Stuttgart	19? (Note: This claim is not listed by Mathews and Foreman.)	24 February 1944	—	B-17	
15? (Note: According to Mathews and Foreman, this claim is unconfirmed.)	14 October 1943	14:40	B-17*	PQ 05 Ost S/QU-5	20	25 February 1944	12:20	B-17	PQ 04 Ost S/DF-9/EF-3
16	19 December 1943	12:24	B-17	Zillertal Alps vicinity of Innsbruck	21?	16 March 1944	—	B-17*	
17?	29 January 1944	11:14	B-17*	west of Kaiserslautern	22	18 March 1944	13:42	P-51	northwest of Stuttgart
18?	23 February 1944	—	B-24						
– 10. Sturmstaffel of Jagdgeschwader 3 "Udet" – Defense of the Reich and on the Western Front — 3–16 August 1944
23	3 August 1944	15:50	B-17	PQ 05 Ost S/TO-6; Bouzonville	25?	15 August 1944	—	B-17	
24	9 August 1944	10:45	B-17	PQ 04 Ost S/BR-7/9 east of Oberkirch	26?	16 August 1944	—	B-17	vicinity of Althausen

=== Awards ===
- Iron Cross (1939) 2nd and 1st Class
- German Cross in Gold on 16 April 1944 as Leutnant in the 9./Jagdgeschwader 3
- Honor Goblet of the Luftwaffe on 15 May 1944 as Leutnant and pilot (Note: According to Obermaier on 15 April 1944.)
- Knight's Cross of the Iron Cross on 14 January 1945 as Oberleutnant and Staffelkapitän of the 9.(Sturm-)/Jagdgeschwader 3 "Udet" (Note: According to Scherzer as pilot in the IV./Jagdgeschwader 3 "Udet".)
