= Hans Weik =

German fighter ace and Knight's Cross recipient (1922–2001)

- Born: 6 July 1922; Heilbronn, Weimar Republic
- Died: 5 June 2001 (aged 78); Heidenheim an der Brenz, Germany
- Military career
- Allegiance: Nazi Germany
- Branch: Luftwaffe
- Service years: 1941–1945
- Rank: Hauptmann (captain)
- Units: JG 3, EJGr Ost, EJG 2
- Conflicts: World War II: Eastern Front; Defense of the Reich
- Awards: Knight's Cross of the Iron Cross
- Other work: Architect

Hans Weik (6 July 1922 – 5 June 2001) was a former German Luftwaffe fighter ace and recipient of the Knight's Cross of the Iron Cross during World War II. He is credited with 36 victories achieved in only 85 combat missions, including 25 victories over the Western Front. Following World War II, Weik became an architect and died on 5 June 2001 in Heidenheim an der Brenz.

== Early life and career ==
Weik was born on 6 July 1922 in Heilbronn in the Free People's State of Württemberg of the Weimar Republic. He joined the Luftwaffe in October 1941 and following his flight and fighter pilot training, (Note: Flight training in the Luftwaffe progressed through the levels A1, A2 and B1, B2, referred to as A/B flight training. A training included theoretical and practical training in aerobatics, navigation, long-distance flights and dead-stick landings. The B courses included high-altitude flights, instrument flights, night landings and training to handle the aircraft in difficult situations.), Weik was posted to the Geschwaderstab (headquarters unit) of Jagdgeschwader 3 "Udet" (JG 3—3rd Fighter Wing) on 21 February 1943 holding the rank of Leutnant (second lieutenant). At the time, the Geschwaderstab was based at Tatsinskaya Airfield and had been fighting in the Battle of Stalingrad.

== World War II ==
World War II in Europe had begun on Friday, 1 September 1939 when German forces invaded Poland. In June 1941, German forces had invaded the Soviet Union in Operation Barbarossa. Following the German defeat at Stalingrad in early 1943. The Geschwaderstab under command of Major Wolf-Dietrich Wilcke, fought in operations against the Kuban bridgehead as part of the IV. Fliegerkorps (4th Air Corps). In March 1943, the Geschwaderstab was based at Anapa located on the northern coast of the Black Sea near the Sea of Azov. Here, Weik claimed his first aerial victory on 9 March, a Soviet Yakovlev Yak-1. In total, pilots of the Geschwaderstab claimed 38 aerial victories in March and April 1943, including eleven by Weik. In early May 1943, the Geschwaderstab was ordered out of actions and returned to München-Gladbach, present-day Mönchengladbach. For his achievements on the Eastern Front, Weik was awarded the both classes of the Iron Cross (Eisernes Kreuz).

Weik was then posted to 4. Staffel (4th squadron) of Ergänzungs-Jagdgruppe Ost, a supplementary fighter pilot training unit based at La Rochelle. Flying with this unit, Weik claimed his first four-engined heavy bomber on 16 September, a Boeing B-17 Flying Fortress. In November 1943, Weik was transferred to 9. Staffel of JG 3, a squadron of III. Gruppe (3rd group). In November 1943, 9. Staffel was commanded by Leutnant Ekkehard Tichy and based at Bad Wörishofen and fighting in defense of the Reich. On 19 December, the United States Army Air Forces (USAAF) Fifteenth Air Force attacked railroad infrastructure at Innsbruck and the Messerschmitt factories at Augsburg. III. Gruppe of JG 3 was vectored to intercept the formation heading for Innsbruck. There, the Gruppe without loss of their own claimed eight B-17 bombers shot down, including one by Weik.

=== Squadron leader and end of war ===
On 10 February 1944, Weik was appointed Staffelkapitän (squadron leader) of 10. Staffel of JG 3. He succeeded Oberleutnant Alfred Humer who had been killed in action. The Staffel was subordinated to IV. Gruppe of JG 3, at the time based at Venlo Airfield and placed under command of Major Friedrich-Karl Müller. On 19 February, Weik logged his first practice flight with IV. Gruppe. On 6 March, the USAAF Eighth Air Force sent a force of 730 heavy bombers escorted by 800 fighters on mission to Berlin. At 11:37, IV. Gruppe took off from their airfield at Salzwedel and intercepted the bombers near Braunschweig. In a frontal attack, Weik claimed one of the B-17 bombers shot down. Shortly after, the Gruppe regrouped and flew a second frontal attack and Weik claimed his second B-17 bomber shot down that day.

Combat box of a 12-plane B-17 squadron. Three such boxes completed a 36-plane group box.: 1. Lead Element; 2. High Element; 3. Low Element; 4. Low Low Element

On 15 April 1944, Generalmajor Adolf Galland, at the time the General der Jagdflieger (General of Fighters), visited IV. Gruppe of JG 3 at the airfield in Salzwedel. Galland announced that the IV. Gruppe would be converted to a Sturmgruppe (assault group), the first of such units, as a means to combat the bomber formations of the USAAF. Similar to the experimental Sturmstaffel 1 (1st Assault Squadron) of JG 3, the Gruppe was equipped with the heavily armored variant of the Focke-Wulf Fw 190 A series. Every pilot of the Gruppe was asked to sign a contract, declaring that they would commit themselves to pressing attacks on the bombers to point-blank range, and that aerial ramming should be considered. Three days later, Hauptmann Wilhelm Moritz was officially appointed Gruppenkommandeur (group commander) of the IV. Sturmgruppe of JG 3. He replaced Hauptmann Heinz Lang, who had temporarily led the Gruppe after its former commander, Major Friedrich-Karl Müller had been appointed Geschwaderkommodore (wing commander) on 11 April. On 8 May, Weik claimed two Consolidated B-24 Liberator and a single B-17 bomber shot down. One of the B-24 bombers claimed was in fact an Herausschuss (separation shot)—a severely damaged heavy bomber forced to separate from its combat box which was counted as an aerial victory. For this, Weik was awarded the German Cross in Gold (Deutsches Kreuz in Gold) two days later.

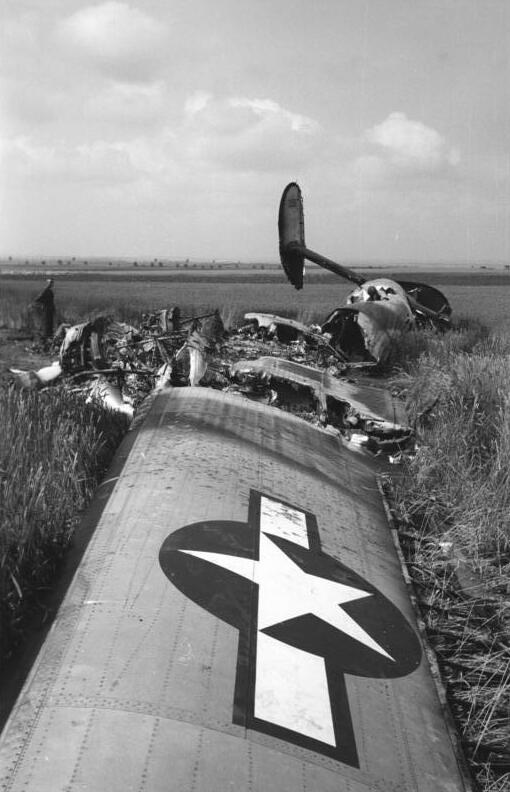
Downed B-24 of the 492nd Bomb Group after an aerial battle over Oschersleben on 7 July 1944

On 7 July, a force of 1,129 B-17 and B-24 bombers of the USAAF Eighth Air Force had set out from England to bomb aircraft factories in the Leipzig area and the synthetic oil plants at Boehlen, Leuna-Merseburg and Lützkendorf. This formation was intercepted by a German Gefechtsverband (combat formation) consisting of IV. Sturmgruppe of JG 3, led by Moritz, escorted by two Gruppen of Bf 109s from Jagdgeschwader 300 (JG 300—300th Fighter Wing) led by Major Walther Dahl. Dahl and Moritz drove the attack to point-blank range behind the Liberators of the 492d Bombardment Group before opening fire. 492d Bombardment Group was temporarily without fighter cover. Within about a minute the entire squadron of twelve B-24s had been annihilated. The Germans claimed 28 USAAF 2nd Air Division B-24 bombers that day and were credited with at least 21. The majority to the Sturmgruppe attack. This figure includes one B-24 bomber claimed shot down by Weik. In total, Luftwaffe pilots claimed the destruction of 60 bombers while actual losses were 28 bombers destroyed and further bombers returned with various levels of combat damage. The authors Prien, Stemmer and Bock state that the consolidated attack flown in close formation by the Sturmgruppe resulted in overclaiming of aerial victories caused by the confusing combat situation. During these attacks, multiple pilots may have simultaneously fired at the same bomber. It was therefore unclear who was responsible for the destruction of the bomber.

On 18 July, the USAAF Fifteenth Air Force sent approximately 500 B-17 and B-24 bombers to targets in southern Germany, northern Italy. Memmingen Airfield was targeted by over 200 bombers, escorted by North American P-51 Mustang and Lockheed P-38 Lightning fighters. At 09:38, IV. Sturmgruppe of JG 3 was scrambled at Memmingen Airfield. A formation of B-17 bombers was intercepted over Lake Starnberg. In this encounter, Weik claimed one of the B-17 bombers shot down, but was also hit by the defensive fire and wounded. His Fw 190 A-8/R2 (Werknummer 680747—factory number) crashed near Kempten. Consequently command of 10. Staffel was briefly passed to Leutnant Walther Hagenah before Oberleutnant Tichy took command of the Staffel on 3 August. During his convalescence, Weik was awarded the Knight's Cross of the Iron Cross (Ritterkreuz des Eisernen Kreuzes) on 27 July for 36 aerial victories claimed and promoted to Hauptmann (captain) on 1 September.

Following his convalescence in April 1945, Weik served with III. Gruppe of Ergänzungs-Jagdgeschwader 2, also known as Erprobungskommando Lechfeld, a replacement training unit which flew the Messerschmitt Me 262 jet fighter Lechfeld.

== Later life ==
After the war, Weik became an architect. He planned and built many schools, sports auditoriums and other buildings. In retirement, he indulged his passion for model shipbuilding. Weik died on 5 June 2001 at the age of 78 in Heidenheim an der Brenz, Germany.

== Summary of career ==
=== Aerial victory claims ===
According to Obermaier, Weik was credited with 36 aerial victories claimed in 85 combat missions, including 25 victories over the Western Front. Forsyth states that he was credited with 22 heavy bombers shot down, making him one of the leading fighter pilots against the heavy bombers. Spick indicates that Weik had a mission-to-claim ratio of 2.78. Mathews and Foreman, authors of Luftwaffe Aces — Biographies and Victory Claims, researched the German Federal Archives and found records for 34 aerial victories, plus two further unconfirmed claims. Of this figure, he claimed eleven aerial victories on the Eastern Front and 23 over the Western Allies, including 22 four-engined bombers.

Victory claims were logged to a map-reference (PQ = Planquadrat), for example "PQ 34 Ost 98344". The Luftwaffe grid map (Jägermeldenetz) covered all of Europe, western Russia and North Africa and was composed of rectangles measuring 15 minutes of latitude by 30 minutes of longitude, an area of about 360 square miles (930 km^{2}). These sectors were then subdivided into 36 smaller units to give a location area 3 km × 4 km (1.9 mi × 2.5 mi) in size.

Chronicle of aerial victories
This along with the * (asterisk) indicates an Herausschuss (separation shot)—a severely damaged heavy bomber forced to separate from his combat box which was counted as an aerial victory. This and the ? (question mark) indicates information discrepancies listed by Prien, Stemmer, Rodeike, Bock, Mathews and Foreman.
Claim	Date	Time	Type	Location	Claim	Date	Time	Type	Location
– Stab of Jagdgeschwader 3 "Udet" – Eastern Front — 4 February – 10 May 1943
1	9 March 1943	11:36	Yak-1	PQ 34 Ost 98344, 2 km (1.2 mi) south of Marijewka	7	15 April 1943	16:30	LaGG-3	PQ 34 Ost 85142, 6 km (3.7 mi) west of Abinskaya
2	23 March 1943	11:27	LaGG-3	PQ 34 Ost 8089, Spewakowka	8	16 April 1943	15:10	P-39	7 km (4.3 mi) northeast of Krymskaya
3	27 March 1943	11:30	I-16	PQ 34 Ost 9881, southwest of Rostov	9	17 April 1943	15:05	P-39	1 km (0.62 mi) west of Kholmskaya; 30 km (19 mi) west-southwest of Taganrog
4	31 March 1943	16:15	La-5	PQ 35 Ost 9057, Golodajew	10	21 April 1943	11:05	Il-2	PQ 34 Ost 75457, south of Novorossiysk
5	11 April 1943	05:35	I-16	PQ 34 Ost 8531, 5 km (3.1 mi) southeast of Krymskaja	11	21 April 1943	11:08	Il-2	PQ 34 Ost 75461, 4 km (2.5 mi) west of Kabardinka
6	11 April 1943	12:03	LaGG-3	PQ 34 Ost 8594, 12 km (7.5 mi) north of Krymskaja					
– 4. Staffel of Ergänzungs-Jagdgruppe Ost – Western Front — September 1943
12	16 September 1943	18:59	B-17	2 km (1.2 mi) south of La Rochelle					
– 9. Staffel of Jagdgeschwader 3 "Udet" – Defense of the Reich – 8 August – 31 December 1943
13	19 December 1943	12:26	B-17	70 km (43 mi) southeast of Innsbruck					
– 10. Sturmstaffel of Jagdgeschwader 3 "Udet" – Defense of the Reich – 1 January – 7 June 1944
13? (Note: According to Mathews and Foreman, this claim is unconfirmed.)	20 February 1944	15:20	P-47	PQ 05 Ost S/OM, Liège; Koblenz-Aachen	25	24 April 1944	13:45	B-17	PQ 04 Ost S/CF, south of Landshut
15	21 February 1944	14:38	B-17*	PQ 05 Ost S/JU, Hannover vicinity of Holzminden	26	24 April 1944	13:46	B-17*	PQ 04 Ost S/CF, south of Landshut
16	25 February 1944	13:20	B-17*	southeast of Crailsheim	27	29 April 1944	11:05	B-17	PQ 15 Ost S/HB-1, Helmstedt
17	4 March 1944	13:10	B-17	PQ 15 Ost S/EF-4, Neuruppin	28	29 April 1944	11:20	B-17	PQ 15 Ost S/HD-3, Burg
18	6 March 1944	12:47	B-17	PQ 15 Ost S/GD-5 south of Tangerhütte	29	8 May 1944	10:09	B-24	PQ 15 Ost S/FA-1 south of Sülze-Südheide
19	6 March 1944	12:52	B-17	PQ 15 Ost S/GE-5, west of Brandenburg north of Braunschweig	30	8 May 1944	10:14	B-24*	PQ 15 Ost S/FA-9, northwest of Braunschweig
20	8 March 1944	13:30	B-17*	PQ 15 Ost S/HD-2; Celle-Rathenow	31	8 May 1944	12:10? (Note: According to Mathews and Foreman claimed at 12:12.)	B-17	PQ 05 Ost S/FT-1, northwest of Nienburg southwest of Hoya
21?	8 March 1944	13:56	P-51	PQ 15 Ost S/HE-8, southwest of Dessau; Celle-Rathenow	32	12 May 1944	12:30	B-17	PQ 05 Ost S/PR, northeast of Frankfurt
22	23 March 1944	11:20	B-17	PQ 05 Ost S/KQ-9, Recklingen southeast of Dissen	33	12 May 1944	12:37	B-17	PQ 05 Ost S/PS, northeast of Frankfurt; Bad Nauheim-Fulda
23	30 March 1944	16:30	P-47	10 km (6.2 mi) southwest of Mönchengladbach	34	13 May 1944	14:24	B-17	PQ 05 Ost S/UG-7, south of Grimmen
24	24 April 1944	13:36	B-17	PQ 04 Ost S/CE, northeast of Munich					
– 10. Sturmstaffel of Jagdgeschwader 3 "Udet" – Defense of the Reich – 1–18 July 1944
35	7 July 1944	09:42	B-24	PQ 15 Ost S/HC, Oschersleben	36	18 July 1944	10:50	B-17	30 km (19 mi) southeast of Memmingen

=== Awards ===
- Iron Cross (1939) 2nd and 1st Class
- Honor Goblet of the Luftwaffe on 15 May 1944 as Leutnant and pilot
- German Cross in Gold on 10 May 1944 as Leutnant in the 10./Jagdgeschwader 3
- Knight's Cross of the Iron Cross on 27 July 1944 as Leutnant and Staffelführer of the 10./Jagdgeschwader 3 "Udet"
