= Polonne Raion =

Former subdivision of Khmelnytskyi Oblast, Ukraine

Polonne Raion Полонський район
- Raion
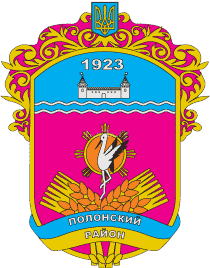
- Flag Coat of arms

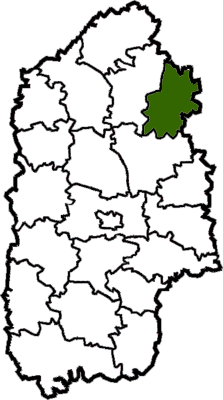
- Coordinates: 50°04′25″N 27°26′56″E
- Country: Ukraine
- Region: Khmelnytskyi Oblast
- Established: 1923
- Disestablished: 18 July 2020
- Admin. center: Polonne
- Subdivisions: List: 1 — city councils; 1 — settlement councils; 17 — rural councils; Number of localities: 1 — cities; 1 — urban-type settlements; 44 — villages; 1 — rural settlements

Government
  - Governor: Alexander M. Dekhtyaruk

Area
  - Total: 866 km^{2} (334 sq mi)

Population (2020)
  - Total: 42,649
  - Density: 49.2/km^{2} (128/sq mi)
- Time zone: UTC+02:00 (EET)
  - Summer (DST): UTC+03:00 (EEST)
- Postal index: 30500—30545
- Area code: 380-3843
- Website: poladm.gov.ua

Polonne Raion (Ukrainian: Полонський район) was a raion of Khmelnytskyi Oblast in Ukraine. Its administrative center is Polonne. It was established in 1923. 1 city (Polonne), 1 urban-type settlement and 45 villages were located in Polonne Raion. The raion was abolished on 18 July 2020 as part of the administrative reform of Ukraine, which reduced the number of raions of Khmelnytskyi Oblast to three. The area of Polonne Raion was merged into Shepetivka Raion. The last estimate of the raion population was 42,649 (2020 est.)

== Geography ==
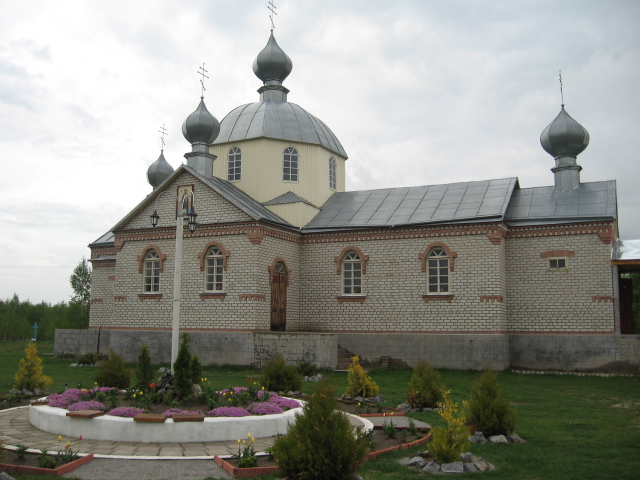
Saint Prince Alexander Nevskyi Nunnery in Cherniivka.

Polonne Raion was a part of Volhynia. It was one out 20 Raions of Khmelnytskyi Oblast. This was a small raion, it occupied 15th place among the districts of the region (866 km^{2} corresponds to 4,2% of the total area of Khmelnytskyi Oblast).

Polonne Raion was east of Shepetivka Raion, north of Starokostiantyniv Raion, west and south-west of Zhytomyr Oblast (Liubar Raion, Romaniv Raion and Baranivka Raion). The Sluch, Homora, Derevychka, Smilka and other rivers flowed through the district. There was a rail line through the district (Shepetivka—Polonne—Berdychiv).

== Subdivisions ==
At the time of disestablishment, the raion consisted of two hromadas:

- Polonne urban hromada with the administration in Polonne;
- Poninka settlement hromada with the administration in the urban-type settlement of Poninka.

== History ==
From 1923 to 1932 the district was part of Shepetivka region, then from 1932 to 1937 it was part of Vinnytsia Oblast. Following that from 1937 to 1954 it was part of Kamenets Podolsk region. Since 1954 it has been part of Khmelnytskyi Oblast. Finally Polonne Raion was formed December 8, 1966.
