= Handorf (Münster) =

- Country: Germany
- State: North Rhine-Westphalia
- District: Münster

Area
  - Total: 30.68 km^{2} (11.85 sq mi)
- Elevation: 50 m (160 ft)

Population (2023-12-31)
  - Total: 8,151
  - Density: 265.7/km^{2} (688.1/sq mi)
- Postal code: 48157
- Area code: 0251
- Website: Official site

Handorf is a district (Ortsteil) of the city of Münster in North Rhine-Westphalia, Germany. It is part of the administrative borough of Ost.

== History ==
Handorf has a long history, as evidenced by medieval structures like the Haskenau castle at the confluence of the Werse and Ems rivers. Due to its location on the Werse, Handorf became a popular excursion destination in the 19th and 20th centuries and was once referred to as the Village of the Large Coffee Pots.

In the late 20th century, Handorf became a residential suburb of Münster, known for its single-family homes surrounded by greenery, attracting families with children. Many traditional coffee houses have closed, including Hugerlandshof, Hubertushof-Kavermann, and Wersehof.

== Demographics ==
Handorf had 8,151 residents in 2023. Key population data for Handorf as of December 31, 2020:

- Percentage of residents under 20 years: 22.1% (Münster average: 17.4%)
- Percentage of residents over 60 years: 30.2% (Münster average: 23.5%)
- Foreign residents: 8.0% (Münster average: 10.9%)

== Culture ==
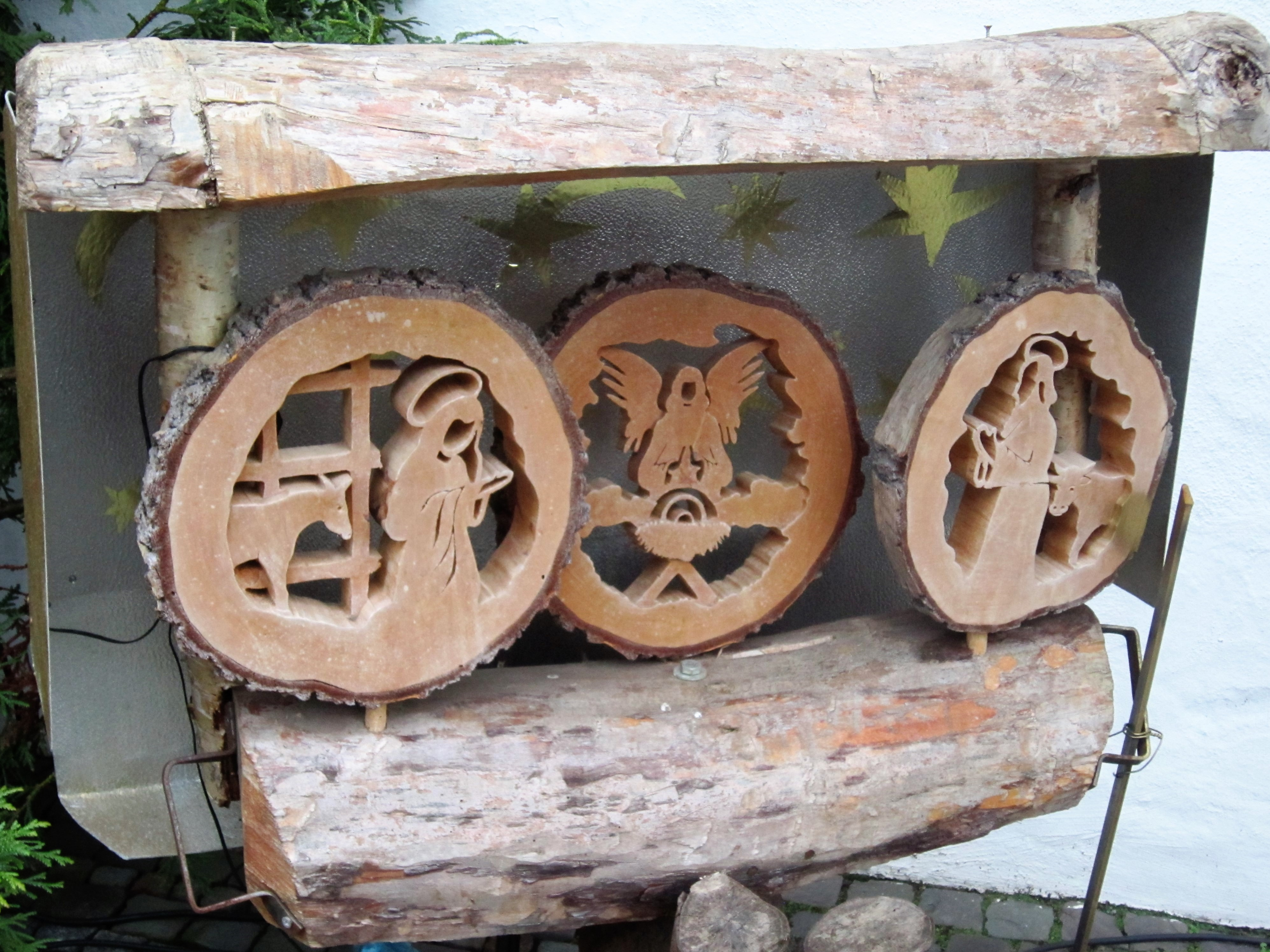
An exhibit on the Handorf Nativity Trail, 2017

The patron saint of Handorf is Saint Petronilla, after whom the local Catholic church is named. Since 2008, the church has been the starting point of a nativity trail that leads to St. Mary of the Assumption Church, also known as Dyckburg Church. In 2017, 118 nativity scenes were displayed at the parish church, with 72 additional scenes along the trail.

Handorf also has an evangelical church, the Zionskirche. The Heriburg Secondary School was closed due to a lack of students, but there are still two primary schools: the Catholic Kardinal-von-Galen School and the non-denominational Matthias-Claudius School.

== Sports ==
The district also features a sports center, which includes an indoor pool operated by the Bürgerbad Handorf association. The former outdoor wave pool was closed in 2006 and later demolished. A new indoor pool, financed and built by Bürgerbad Handorf gGmbH, opened in March 2021.

== Landmarks ==
In 1935, the Mūnster-Handorf Airfield was established. The Lützow Barracks were buit in 1956 on the terrain of the former airfield. It is home to the 1st German-Netherlands Corps and the Air Force Music Corps Münster. Adjacent to the military area is the training site of the Fire Service Institute of North Rhine-Westphalia (IdF), the largest firefighting training facility in Germany.

The Handorf subdistrict of Dorbaum is characterized by single-family housing and a military barracks with a training area, which also serves as a local recreational space. However, parts of the northern training area remain restricted due to unexploded ordnance and ammunition. These areas have become valuable nature reserves, hosting rare species such as the European tree frog and European honey buzzard. The northern area also borders the Emsaue Vadrup nature reserve, home to Konik horses and Heck cattle, making it a regional tourist attraction.

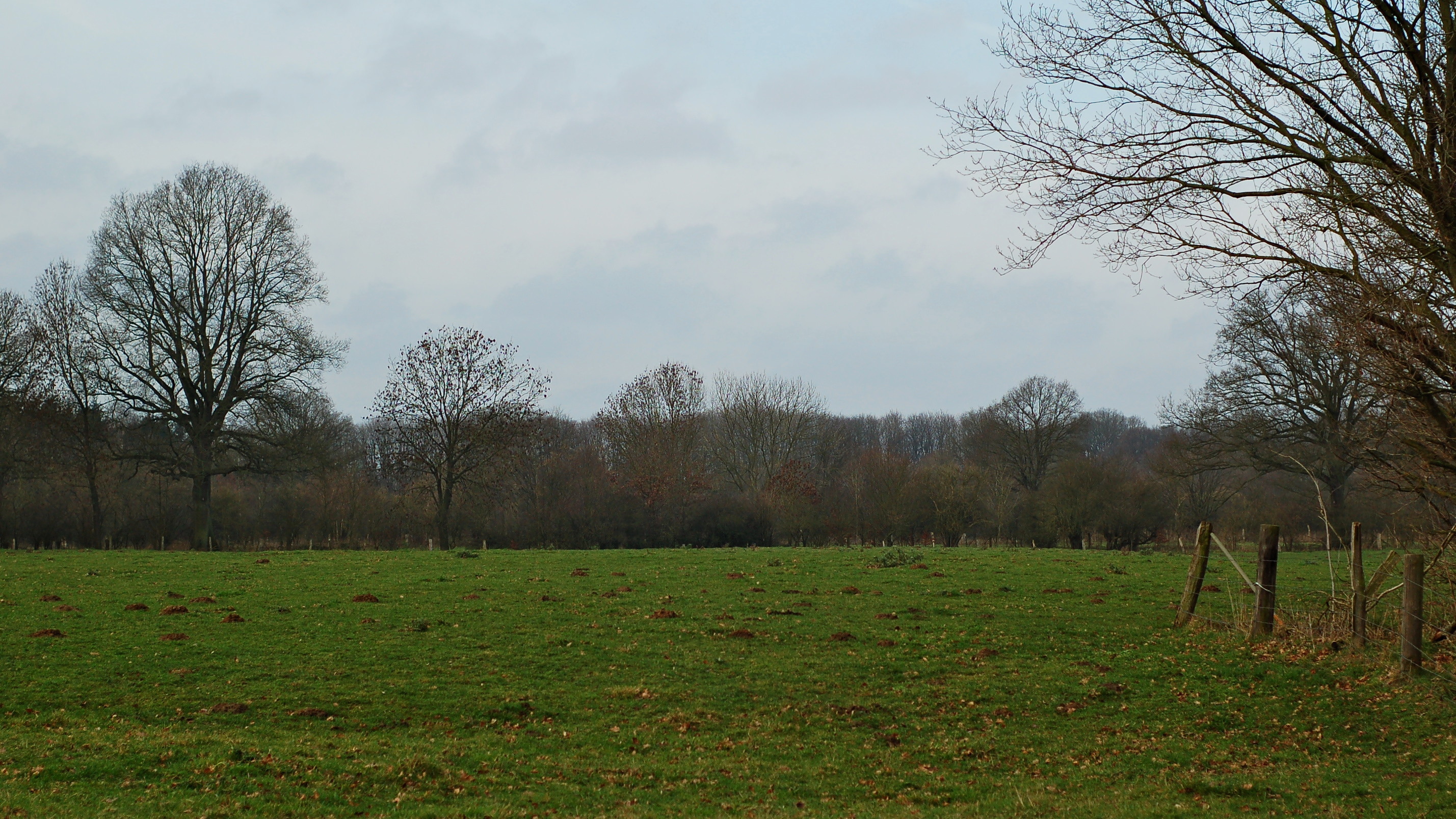
Münsterland park landscape in Dorbaum

In May 2013, plans were announced to build a new prison on the site of the military training area. However, the proposal faced opposition from local groups, hunters, and conservationists, leading to its cancellation in 2014.

In Dorbaum, the Hornheide Specialist Clinic serves as a leading center for the treatment of skin tumors and head and neck cancer, as well as surgical reconstruction.

== Notable residents ==
- Everwin II von Droste zu Handorf (†1535), mayor of Münster during the Reformation and estate owner.
