= Isaiah Leo Sharfman =

American economist (1886–1969)

- Born: February 19, 1886; Polonne, Russian Empire
- Died: September 9, 1969 (aged 83); Washington, D.C.
- Education: B. A., LL. B.
- Alma mater: Boston Latin School, Harvard University
- Occupations: Economist, Professor
- Spouse: Minnie Shikes (m. 1910)
- Children: Nelson Ames Sharfman; Warren Leonard Sharfman; Marcia Sharfman Gilmartin

Isaiah Leo Sharfman (February 19, 1886, Polonne, Russian Empire (Note: Polonoya, Southern Russia, according to The Michigan Alumnus) – September 9, 1969, Washington, D.C.) was an American economist. He was a professor at the University of Michigan from 1914 to 1955 and served as the president of the American Economic Association in 1945.

== Early life and education ==
Sharfman was born into a Jewish family in the Russian Empire and came to the United States in 1894. He attended Boston Latin School and Harvard University, graduating with a B. A. in 1907 and LL.B. in 1910. He was an assistant in economics at Harvard College while studying for his degree in law.

== Career ==
After graduating from Harvard Law School Sharfman took up a professorship for law and political science at the Imperial Pei-Yang University in China. He returned to the United States after two years and briefly worked as the Chief Investigator for the Department on Regulation of Interstate and Municipal Utilities for the National Civic Federation of New York. He joined the faulty of the University of Michigan as a lecturer in political economy and instructor in contracts the same year, standing in for Jerome C. Knowlton. He was promoted to professor in 1914 and Henry Carter Adams University Professor in 1947, serving as the chairman of the department from 1928 to 1955.

Sharfman was president of the American Economic Association for 1945.

== Research ==
Sharfman wrote extensively about regulation. He was awarded The James Barr Ames Prize for his multi-volume work The Interstate Commerce Commission.

== Other activities ==
Sharfman was a member of the Advisory Committee on Railroad Employment to the Federal Coordinator of Transportation from 1933 to 1936 and an associate member of the National War Labor Board from 1942 to 1944.

He became a trustee of Brandeis University in 1955, which awarded him an honorary LL.D. in 1964 and held a memorial service in his honor after his death.

== Personal life ==
In 1910 Sharfman married Minnie Shikes. He had three children, Nelson Ames Sharfman (born July 7, 1911), Warren Leonard Sharfman (born November 10, 1912) and Marcia Sharfman Gilmartin, all of who were alumni of the University of Michigan. Marcia later studied for a graduate degree in education at the same university. Sharfman died in Washington, D.C. His nephew is the American journalist Mike Wallace.
