= Franz Beyer (pilot) =

German World War II fighter pilot (1918–1944)

- Beyer as an Oberleutnant
- Born: 22 April 1918; Berlin-Grunewald
- Died: 11 February 1944 (aged 25) south of Liège, Belgium
- Cause of death: Killed in action
- Burial place: Ysselsteyn German war cemetery Plot L-row 11-grave 263
- Military career
- Allegiance: Nazi Germany
- Branch: Luftwaffe
- Service years: 1938–1944
- Rank: Major (major)
- Unit: JG 3
- Conflicts: See battles World War II: Battle of France; Battle of Britain; Operation Barbarossa; Italian Campaign; Defence of the Reich
- Awards: Knight's Cross of the Iron Cross

Franz Beyer (22 April 1918 – 11 February 1944) was a German Luftwaffe fighter pilot during World War II and a recipient of the Knight's Cross of the Iron Cross of Nazi Germany. Beyer was killed on 11 February near Venlo, the Netherlands after dog-fighting with British Spitfires. During his career he was credited with 83 aerial victories, 6 on the Western Front and 77 on the Eastern Front. On 1 June 1943, Beyer was appointed Gruppenkommandeur of IV. Gruppe of Jagdgeschwader 3.

== Early life and career ==
Beyer was born on 22 April 1918 in Berlin-Grunewald at the time the capital of the German Empire. He joined the Luftwaffe in 1938 and following flight and fighter pilot training, (Note: Flight training in the Luftwaffe progressed through the levels A1, A2 and B1, B2, referred to as A/B flight training. A training included theoretical and practical training in aerobatics, navigation, long-distance flights and dead-stick landings. The B courses included high-altitude flights, instrument flights, night landings and training to handle the aircraft in difficult situations.) Beyer was posted to 8. Staffel (8th squadron) Jagdgeschwader 3 (JG 3—3rd Fighter Wing) in early 1940, a Staffel of III. Gruppe (3rd group) of JG 3.

== World War II ==
World War II in Europe had begun on Friday 1 September 1939 when German forces invaded Poland. On 28 March 1940, III. Gruppe of JG 3 was considered operationally ready and transferred to Detmold Airfield where it was tasked with defending Germany's western border during the "Phoney War". On 10 April, the Gruppe relocated to Hopsten Airfield. In preparation for the Battle of France, III. Gruppe was subordinated to Luftflotte 2, supporting Army Group Bs attack into the Netherlands. Following the Armistice of 22 June 1940, III. Gruppe was ordered to Dieppe on 29 June where the unit was tasked with patrolling the French coast at the English Channel.

Beyer claimed his first aerial victory on 14 August 1940 during the Battle of Britain with the Royal Air Force (RAF). Around midday, III. Gruppe flew a combat air patrol to the area of Folkestone and Dover where they encountered a formation of Hawker Hurricane fighters. In this engagement, III. Gruppe pilots claimed four Hurricane fighters shot down, including one by Beyer, for the loss of one of their own pilots killed in action. He claimed his second aerial victory on 5 September, a Supermarine Spitfire fighter shot down on a mission over southern England. Two days later on 7 September, the Luftwaffe launched Operation "Loge", 350 bombers escorted by 648 fighters, attacked various targets in the greater London area. The Gruppe protected those bombers returning from the docks in the East End of London. That day, Beyer claimed a Hurricane fighter shot down.

On 15 February 1941, III. Gruppe was ordered to Gütersloh Airfield in Germany for a period of rest and replenishment. At Gütersloh, the Gruppe received a full complement of the then new Bf 109 F-2 variant. On 3 May, III. Gruppe moved back to the English Channel front where it was based at Lillers. On 9 June, III. Gruppe was withdrawn again from the west and ordered to transfer to Breslau-Gandau, now known as 'Wrocław Airport' in Poland.

=== War against the Soviet Union ===
The Gruppe relocated to an airfield at Moderówka on 18 June where the Gruppe concluded their last preparations for Operation Barbarossa, the German invasion of the Soviet Union on 22 June 1941. At the start of the campaign, JG 3 was subordinated to the V. Fliegerkorps (5th Air Corps), under command of General der Flieger Robert Ritter von Greim, which was part of Luftflotte 4 (4th Air Fleet), under command of Generaloberst Alexander Löhr. These air elements supported Generalfeldmarschall Gerd von Rundstedt's Heeresgruppe Süd (Army Group South), with the objective of capturing Ukraine and its capital Kiev.

On 12 July 1941, Beyer was appointed Staffelkapitän (squadron leader) of the 8. Staffel of JG 3. He replaced Oberleutnant Winfried Schmidt who had been wounded the day before. He was awarded the Knight's Cross of the Iron Cross (Ritterkreuz des Eisernes Kreuzes) on 30 August 1941 for 30 aerial victories and further destroying ten aircraft on the ground.

On 27 February 1943, III. Gruppe moved to an airfield at Pavlohrad, supporting German forces fighting in the Third Battle of Kharkov. Here on 1 April, Beyer claimed his 80th aerial victory over a Mikoyan-Gurevich MiG-3 fighter, his last on the Eastern Front.

=== Group commander and death ===
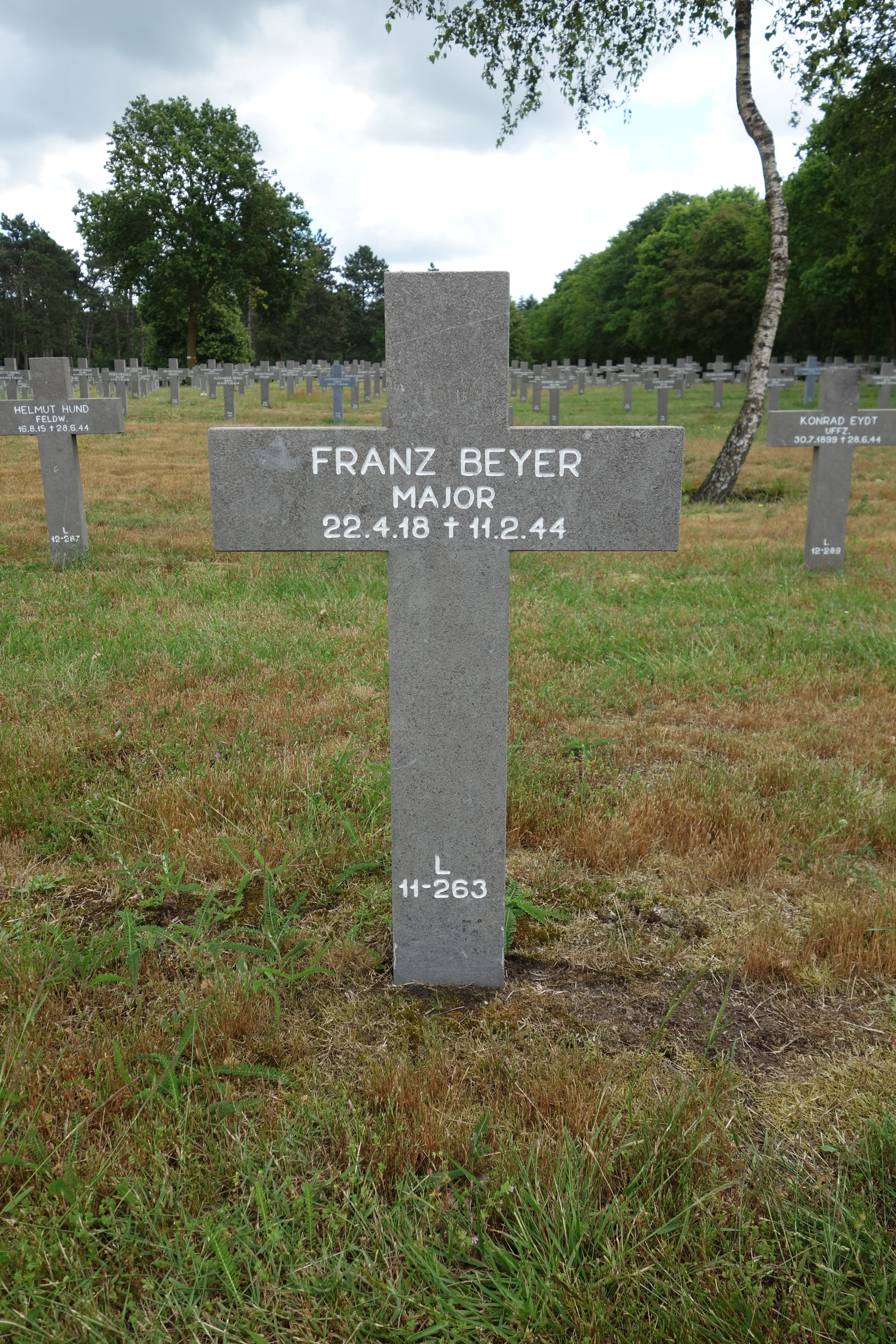
German War Cemetery Ysselsteyn - Franz Beyer

On 31 May 1943, Beyer was transferred and command of 8. Staffel was passed on to Oberleutnant Emil Bitsch. As part of the Luftwaffe plan to expand its fighter force, a fourth Gruppe was to be added to every Geschwader. This was achieved by transferring some of the other Gruppen's personnel and equipment. This created the nucleus of a newly formed Gruppe. IV. Gruppe of JG 3 was officially created on 1 June 1943 at Neubiberg Airfield and Beyer was selected as its first Gruppenkommandeur (group commander). The Gruppe was initially equipped with the Messerschmitt Bf 109 G-6, some carrying a pair of 20 mm MG 151/20 cannons installed in conformal gun pods under the wings. Beyer was not given much time to prepare his pilots for combat, already in mid-June, the Gruppe was ordered to Italy to fight in the Mediterranean theater.

On 11 July, IV. Gruppe was ordered to an airfield at Ramacca, Sicily. There, the Gruppe supported German forces defending against the Allied invasion of Sicily. Due to the advancing Allied forces, the airfield had to be abandoned on 15 July, forcing the Gruppe to retreat to Leverano. Beyer claimed his first aerial victory in this theater of operations on 19 July when he shot down a Supermarine Spitfire fighter. On 23 July, the airfield at Leverona came under a heavy attack, killing one pilot and injuring six. The ground personnel suffered 30 killed and further 31 men were wounded. In the attack, the Gruppe lost 40 Bf 109s destroyed. In consequence, the airfield was abandoned by IV. Gruppe on 26 July, relocating to San Severo Airfield. On 21 August, approximately 50 to 60 Consolidated B-24 Liberator bombers without fighter escort were intercepted by Luftwaffe fighters from IV. Gruppe of JG 3 and I. Gruppe of Jagdgeschwader 77 (JG 77—77th Bomber Wing) in the vicinity of Naples. Luftwaffe fighter pilots claimed four bombers shot down, including one by Beyer who was credited with his 82nd aerial victory.

IV. Gruppe was ordered back to Germany on 24 September where it was initially again based at Neubiberg Airfield. Over the following weeks, the Gruppe was assigned new pilots and aircraft and trained for Defense of the Reich missions. The head on attack was practiced in mock combat against Heinkel He 111 bombers from III. Gruppe of Kampfgeschwader 53 (KG 53—53rd Bomber Wing). The Gruppe flew its first combat mission against United States Army Air Forces (USAAF) on 19 December. The day the USAAF Fifteenth Air Force attacked Innsbruck and the Messerschmitt factory at Augsburg. Defending against this attack, Beyer claimed a Boeing B-17 Flying Fortress bomber shot down.

On 28 January 1944, IV. Gruppe relocated to Venlo Airfield. On 11 February, the USAAF Eighth Air Force targeted the German railroad infrastructure at Frankfurt. In parallel to this attack, a formation of Martin B-26 Marauder bombers, escorted by Spitfire fighters, attacked various targets in Belgium. IV. Gruppe intercepted this formation in the vicinity of Liège. In this encounter, IV. Gruppe claimed two aerial victories but lost Beyer. Flying Bf 109 G-6 (Werknummer 411036—factory number), he was chased by Spitfire fighters and collided with a tree south of Liège. Beyer was buried with military honors at Venlo on 17 February and later reinterred at the Ysselsteyn German war cemetery. Command of IV. Gruppe was temporarily passed to Hauptmann Heinz Lang before command was officially handed to Major Friedrich-Karl "Tutti" Müller on 26 February.

== Summary of career ==
=== Aerial victory claims ===
According to US historian David T. Zabecki, Beyer was credited with 83 aerial victories. Spick lists Beyer with 81 aerial victories claimed in an unknown number of combat missions. This figure includes 70 aerial victories on the Eastern Front and eleven over the Western Allies. Mathews and Foreman, authors of Luftwaffe Aces — Biographies and Victory Claims, researched the German Federal Archives and found records for 84 aerial victory claims. This figure includes 78 aerial victories on the Eastern Front and six on the Western Front, including two four-engined bombers.

Victory claims were logged to a map-reference (PQ = Planquadrat), for example "PQ 3936". The Luftwaffe grid map (Jägermeldenetz) covered all of Europe, western Russia and North Africa and was composed of rectangles measuring 15 minutes of latitude by 30 minutes of longitude, an area of about 360 square miles (930 km^{2}). These sectors were then subdivided into 36 smaller units to give a location area 3 km × 4 km (1.9 mi × 2.5 mi) in size.

Chronicle of aerial victories
This and the ? (question mark) indicates information discrepancies listed by Prien, Stemmer, Rodeike, Bock, Mathews and Foreman.
Claim	Date	Time	Type	Location	Claim	Date	Time	Type	Location
– 8. Staffel of Jagdgeschwader 3 – At the Channel and over England — 26 June 1940 – 9 June 1941
1	14 August 1940	13:50	Hurricane		3	7 September 1940	18:10	Hurricane	
2	5 September 1940	11:10	Spitfire						
– Stab II. Gruppe of Jagdgeschwader 3 "Udet" – Operation Barbarossa — 22 June – 11 July 1941
4	22 June 1941	07:29	I-16		11	2 July 1941	09:30	I-153	
5	22 June 1941	18:55	I-153		12	2 July 1941	11:30	V-11 (Il-2)	15 km (9.3 mi) north of Klevan
6	23 June 1941	09:58	SB-2	Wojnica-Zaturcze	13? (Note: This claim is not listed by Mathews and Foreman.)	7 July 1941	18:54	I-16	west of Vinnytsia airfield
7	25 June 1941	08:55	SB-2		14	7 July 1941	18:55	I-16	Vinnytsia airfield
8	25 June 1941	09:12	DB-3		15	10 July 1941	19:31	TB-3(ANT-6)	
9	28 June 1941	18:15	SB-2	5 km (3.1 mi) southeast of Zdolbernow	16	10 July 1941	19:35	TB-3 (ANT-6)	
10	2 July 1941	06:05	I-16						
– 8. Staffel of Jagdgeschwader 3 "Udet" – Operation Barbarossa — 12 July – 6 November 1941
17	13 July 1941	06:10	ZKB-19 (DB-3)	west of Kiev	30	27 July 1941	18:40	I-15	
18	13 July 1941	06:10	ZKB-19	northeast of Kiev	31	27 July 1941	18:41	I-15	
19	15 July 1941	15:00	I-153		32	7 September 1941	18:00	I-16	
20	15 July 1941	15:07	I-153	70 km (43 mi) southeast of Berdychiv	33	20 September 1941	16:18	DB-3	
21	17 July 1941	16:03	SB-3		34	24 September 1941	09:46	SB-3	
22	17 July 1941	16:05	SB-3		35	3 October 1941	16:35	Il-2	
23	17 July 1941	19:10	DB-3		36	5 October 1941	16:07	Il-2	
24	20 July 1941	18:45	I-17 (MiG-1)		37	6 October 1941	15:57	I-16	
25	21 July 1941	10:47	I-16	15 km (9.3 mi) northeast of Bila Tserkva	38	11 October 1941	13:20	Il-2	
26	23 July 1941	12:45	DB-3		39	11 October 1941	13:25	Il-2	
27	23 July 1941	13:47	SB-3		40	12 October 1941	09:40	Il-2	15 km (9.3 mi) west-southwest of Mtsensk
28	24 July 1941	18:45	I-17 (MiG-1)		41	18 October 1941	07:00	Pe-2	
29	24 July 1941	18:48	I-17 (MiG-1)		42	25 October 1941	13:48	I-16	
– 8. Staffel of Jagdgeschwader 3 "Udet" – Eastern Front – 10 February 1942 – 14 April 1942
43	13 February 1942	09:57	Il-2		49	28 February 1942	10:30	I-301 (LaGG-3)	southeast of Staraya Russa
44	16 February 1942	12:02	R-5		? (Note: This claim is not listed by Prien, Stemmer, Rodeike and Bock.)	12 March 1942	13:08	BB-22 (Seversky)	35 km (22 mi) southeast of Soltsy
45	22 February 1942	16:04	R-5	20 km (12 mi) north-northeast of Staraya Russa	50	12 March 1942	13:58	Yak-4	25 km (16 mi) southeast of Soltsy
46	23 February 1942	08:55	R-5	15 km (9.3 mi) northwest of Kresttsy; 15 km (9.3 mi) southeast of Staraya Russa	51	17 March 1942	16:22	I-61 (MiG-3)	5 km (3.1 mi) southeast of Mury
47?	26 February 1942	08:55	R-5		52	31 March 1942	12:57	I-61 (MiG-3)	30 km (19 mi) east of Staraya Russa
48	26 February 1942	17:07	R-5	5 km (3.1 mi) north of Konjuchowo					
– 8. Staffel of Jagdgeschwader 3 "Udet" – Eastern Front – 14 April 1942 – 3 February 1943
53	20 May 1942	05:15	Il-2	north-northeast of Kharkiv	66	9 August 1942	18:30	Il-2	northeast of Kalach
54	20 May 1942	15:42	MiG-1	10 km (6.2 mi) east-northeast of Vovchansk	? (Note: Prien, Stemmer, Rodeike and Bock attributed this claim to Leutnant Hans-Georg Beyer from 9. Staffel.)	20 August 1942	16:23	Pe-2	west of Lake Sweyliya
55	26 May 1942	06:20	Il-2	15 km (9.3 mi) south of Chuhuiv	?	2 September 1942	06:38	LaGG-3	5 km (3.1 mi) north of Hrebinka
56	29 May 1942	16:13	Yak-4	15 km (9.3 mi) east of Chuhuiv	?	7 September 1942	16:41	Il-2	5 km (3.1 mi) northeast of Orlowka
57	29 May 1942	16:15	Yak-4	25 km (16 mi) east-northeast of Chuhuiv	67	10 December 1942	07:40	Il-2	north of Pitomnik Airfield
58	26 June 1942	08:54	Il-2		68	10 December 1942	08:44	MiG-3	4 km (2.5 mi) northwest of Pitomnik Airfield
59	1 July 1942	12:32	MiG-3		69	10 December 1942	08:50	Il-2	4 km (2.5 mi) east of Kriwomusginskaja
60	5 July 1942	18:27	Boston		70	11 December 1942	09:40	MiG-3	30 km (19 mi) north-northwest of Pitomnik Airfield
61	5 July 1942	18:30	Boston		71	11 December 1942	10:45	La-5	5 km (3.1 mi) southwest of Pitomik Airfield
62	11 July 1942	03:23	Boston	Nishne Kisljay	72	11 December 1942	11:53	MiG-3	10 km (6.2 mi) east of Pitomik Airfield
63	28 July 1942	09:03	LaGG-3	northeast of Kalach	73	19 December 1942	11:10	Boston	10 km (6.2 mi) southeast of Bokorskaja
64	3 August 1942	11:40	MiG-3	east of Kalach	74	28 December 1942	10:40	Yak-1	north of Chernyshkovsky
65	9 August 1942	18:27	Il-2	PQ 3936	75	28 December 1942	14:05	Il-2	12 km (7.5 mi) north-northeast of Morozovskaya
– 8. Staffel of Jagdgeschwader 3 "Udet" – Eastern Front – 4 February – 31 May 1943
76	12 February 1943	11:18	Il-2	east of Sloviansk	79	22 March 1943	12:13	LaGG-3	10 km (6.2 mi) south of Rostov
77	12 February 1943	11:20	Il-2	east of Sloviansk	80?	1 April 1943	08:32	MiG-3	PQ 35 Ost 91321, Menshulin
78	6 March 1943	10:05	Il-2	7 km (4.3 mi) north of Andreyevka					
– Stab IV. Gruppe of Jagdgeschwader 3 "Udet" – Mediterranean theater – 1 July – 28 September 1943
81	19 July 1943	15:10	Spitfire	Troina; Sicily	82	21 August 1943	14:14	B-24	5 km (3.1 mi) east of Marcianise; 4 km (2.5 mi) east of Pomigliano d'Arco
– Stab IV. Gruppe of Jagdgeschwader 3 "Udet" – Defense of the Reich – 28 September – 31 December 1943
83	19 December 1943	12:24? (Note: According to Mathews and Foreman claimed at 12:04.)	B-17	south of Innsbruck					

=== Awards ===
- Iron Cross (1939) 2nd and 1st Class
- Knight's Cross of the Iron Cross on 30 August 1941 as Oberleutnant and Staffelkapitän of the 8./Jagdgeschwader 3. (Note: According to Scherzer as pilot in the 8./Jagdgeschwader 3.)
- German Cross in Gold on 19 September 1942 as Oberleutnant in the 8./Jagdgeschwader 3

== Notes ==
Military offices
Preceded by None	Commander of IV./Jagdgeschwader 3; 1 June 1943 – 11 February 1944	Succeeded by Hauptmann Heinz Lang
