= Münster-Handorf Airfield =

Former German military airfield

Münster-Handorf Airfield Advanced Landing Ground (ALG) Y-94 Fliegerhorst Münster-Handorf

- Aerial view in October 1944

Site information
- Type: Military airfield
- Condition: Agricultural Area

Location
- Coordinates: 51°59′18″N 007°43′55″E

Site history
- Built: 1935
- Built by: Luftwaffe
- In use: 1935-1945 (Luftwaffe); 1945 (United States Army Air Forces); 1945-1949 (Royal Air Force); 1960-1961 (Royal Netherlands Army)
- Demolished: 1961

Münster-Handorf Airfield is a former military airfield located in Handorf, about 5 miles east-northeast of Münster, North Rhine-Westphalia; approximately 250 miles west of Berlin, Germany.

Fliegerhorst Münster-Handorf was one of the first Luftwaffe airfields, being established in 1935. After being captured by Allied Forces in April 1945, it briefly became an Allied airfield at the end of the war, then being used as a Garrison for the Royal Air Force as part of the Army of Occupation until 1949. RAF 469 Signals Unit, a mobile radar and DF station was situated on the intersection of the destroyed runways until at least 1953, with the operator and maintenance crews billeted at Boniburg Schloss near Hahndorf village until 1953 when a new camp was built at the airfield. Abandoned until 1960, the former airfield was used as a Dutch Nike missile base in 1960/61. It was later closed and today little remains except some concreted areas used as roads and some abandoned destroyed buildings in an industrial estate.

== History ==
Fliegerhorst Münster-Handorf was opened in 1935, one of the first Luftwaffe airfields of the reconstituted German Air Force. It was opened as a flight school, with Flugzeugführerschule A/B 12 using Arado Ar 66 and other trainers.

=== Luftwaffe use during World War II ===
The base became an operational field in September 1939, shortly after World War II broke out. Kampfgeschwader 54 (KG 54) arrived in September with Heinkel He 111P medium bombers; and three Messerschmitt Bf 109E fighter units, Jagdgeschwader 3 (JG 3); Jagdgeschwader 51 (JG 51) and Jagdgeschwader 21 (JG 21) arrived during the Phony War period with France and Great Britain.

In addition, Jagdgeschwader 27 (JG 27) and Kampfgeschwader 1 (KG 1) were formed at Münster-Handorf with Bf 109Es and He 111H's

After the Battle of France and the war moved west into France and England, Münster-Handorf became an airfield for R&R and re-equipping combat units. Various units moved in and out of the airfield for brief periods of time, JG 77, a Bf 109E fighter unit and KG 3, a Junkers Ju 88A multirole bomber (KG) unit spent time at the field. In June 1943, Lehrgeschwader 1, a Ju 88A trining unit used the field through most of the year.

Allied bombing raid on Münster-Handorf in October 1944

With the increasing Allied bomber attacks on Germany in 1943, Münster-Handorf was assigned to be part of the Defense of the Reich campaign by the Luftwaffe. Nachtjagdgeschwader 7 (NJG 7), a Ju 88G night fighter unit was formed at the base in February 1944 and flew night interceptor missions until September. It was replaced by Nachtjagdgeschwader 2 (NJG 2), also formed at the base which flew missions until November 1944 and Nachtjagdgeschwader 1 (NJG 1), which operated Heinkel He 219 night fighters until April 1945.

Day interceptor units were JG 54 with Focke-Wulf Fw 190As and also Kampfgeschwader 76 (KG 76) were assigned to the field in late 1944 and early 1945. KG 76 possibly never being operational due to fuel shortages.

Kampfgeschwader 2 (KG 2) flew Dornier Do 217 aircraft with V-1 flying bombs attached used the base during September 1944, then moved into the Netherlands to be closer to the British targets.

The Luftwaffe interceptors and the V-1 flying bombs at Münster-Handorf drew the attention of the USAAF Eighth Air Force, with no less than ten heavy bomber attacks on the airfield between December 1943 and March 1945. In addition, as the airfield in range of Ninth Air Force Martin B-26 Marauder medium bombers and Republic P-47 Thunderbolt fighter bombers in eastern France, attacks on the airfield by these tactical units with 500-pound General-Purpose bombs; unguided rockets and .50 caliber machine gun sweeps were frequent. These attacks would take place when Eighth Air Force heavy bombers (Boeing B-17 Flying Fortresses, Consolidated B-24 Liberators) were within interception range of the Luftwaffe aircraft assigned to the base, with the attacks being timed to have the maximum effect possible to keep the interceptors pinned down on the ground and be unable to attack the heavy bombers.

=== USAAF use ===
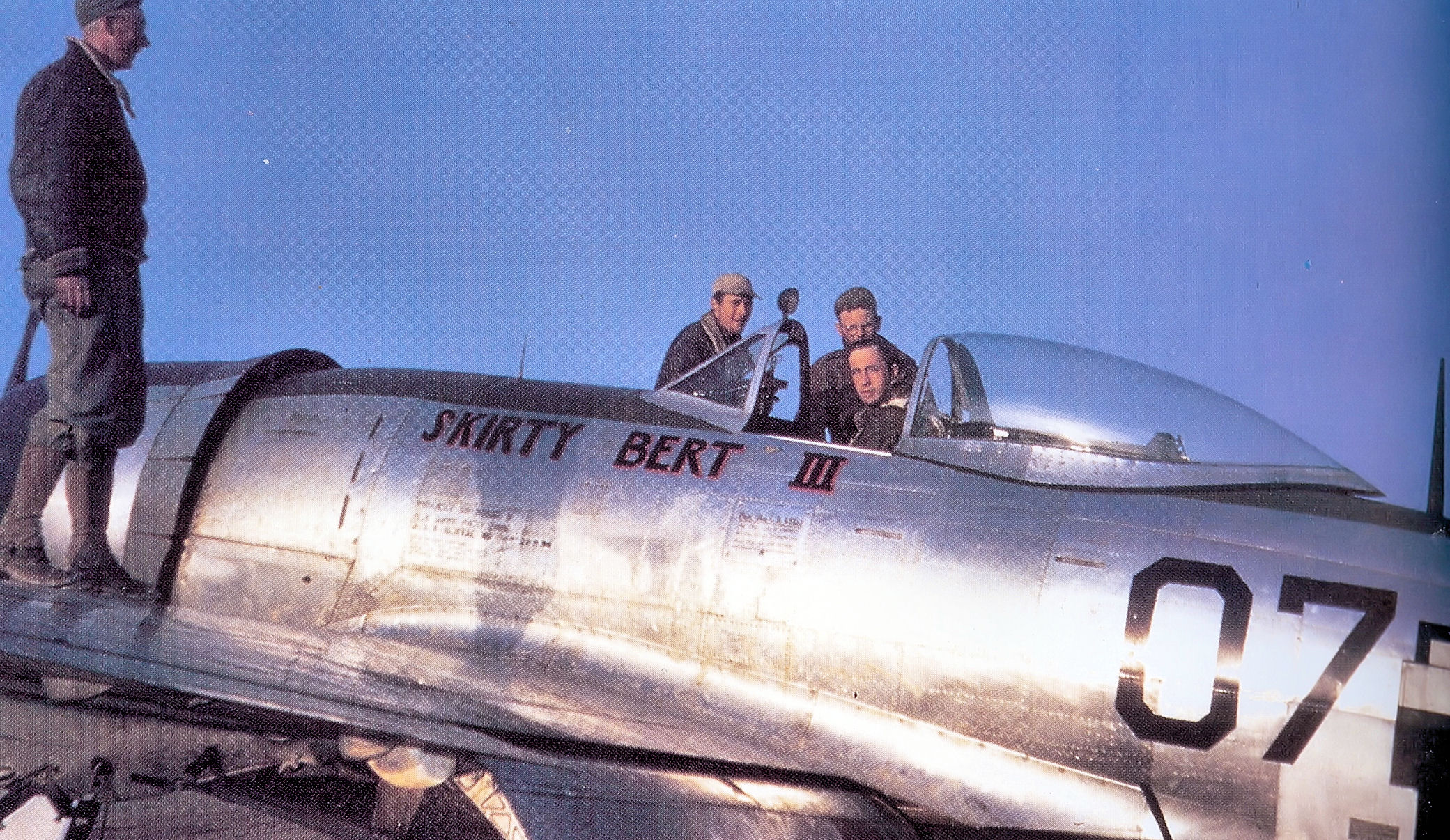
514th Fighter Squadron P-47 Thunderbolt "Skirty Bert III", Münster-Handorf Airfield (Y-94), Germany, April 1945

At the end of March 1945, United States Army units moving to close the Ruhr Pocket captured Münster-Handorf Airfield. On 5 April the IX Engineer Command 852d Engineer Aviation Battalion moved in and began patching the bomb craters of the airfield's concrete runway. The airfield was heavily damaged by the Allied bomb attacks and it took a week for the engineers to fill in bomb craters and lay down a 5000' asphalt runway over the concrete runway used by the Luftwaffe. The airfield being designated as Advanced Landing Ground "Y-94 Handorf" on 12 April.

Almost immediately, Ninth Air Force P-47 Thunderbolts of the 366th Fighter Group and on 15 April, the 406th Fighter Group moved in to press home the attacks on the encircled German forces trapped in the Pocket. The pocket was made smaller and smaller, eventually forcing the surrender of over 300,000 German troops and their equipment.

The victory in the Ruhr essentially eliminated serious opposition by the German Armed forces in Western Germany and afterward American ground forces swept east into Central Germany and Southern Germany, while British and Commonwealth forces moved into northern Germany against little organized resistance.

With the end of combat on 7 May, the combat units moved out in June, the airfield being turned over to Air Technical Service Command. The ATSC 2d Air Depot Group moved in to manage the large number of excess Allied aircraft sent to Handorf, to be returned to the United States, sold to Allied countries, or to be scrapped. The Air Depot operated until the end of 1945, when in December, Münster-Handorf was turned over to the Royal Air Force as part of the British Occupation Zone of Germany.

=== Postwar use ===
The destroyed base had little value to the RAF as an airfield, and the facility was used as a Garrison as part of the Army of Occupation until 1949 when it was closed. Most of Münster-Handorf Airfield was removed during the 1950s as part of the reconstruction effort in West Germany, however in 1960 the former airfield was used by the Netherlands as a temporary Nike Anti-Aircraft Missile base for about a year until permanent facilities could be constructed. The base was closed in 1961, and the land turned over to the German government.

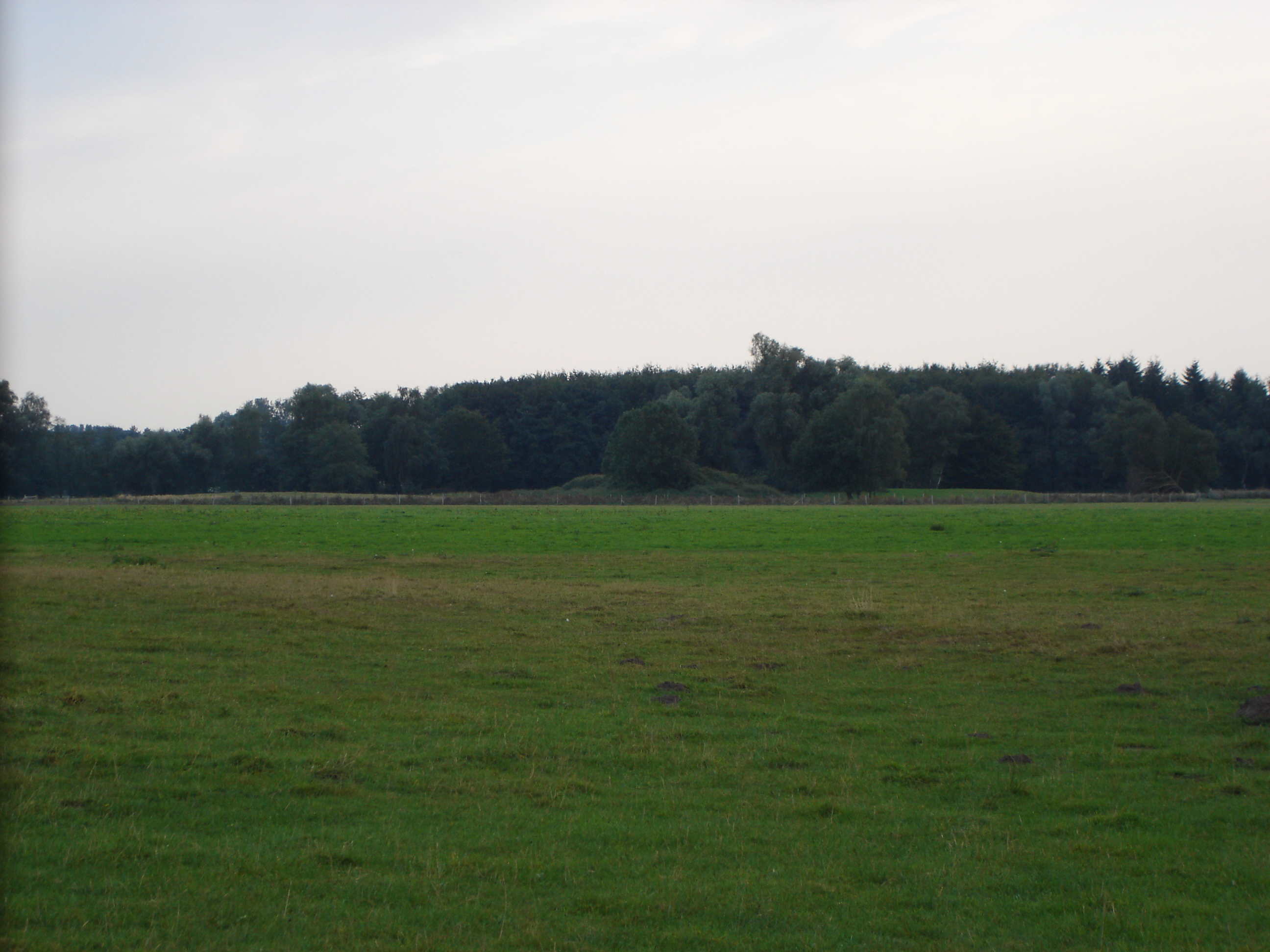
The site in 2006

=== Current ===
Today, Münster-Handorf Airfield is used as agricultural fields. However, there are many relics of the former wartime airfield which can be found.

- 51°59′14″N 007°43′48″E Former maintenance area with several destroyed buildings left as rubble.
- 51°59′18″N 007°43′52″E Aircraft dispersal parking with several destroyed buildings left as rubble.
- 51°59′19″N 007°44′05″E Aircraft dispersal parking
- 51°59′29″N 007°44′01″E Main runway, removed and today a thick vegetative area.
- 51°59′50″N 007°44′06″E Dispersal area, probably remains of destroyed hangars in thick vegetation area.
- 51°59′59″N 007°43′20″E The former Luftwaffe ground station (Also used by the British during their occupation) can be seen just to the northeast of the airfield, with several barracks, administrative buildings, an athletic field and large grass areas (probably the locations of destroyed buildings).

In addition, many isolated remains of concrete taxiways, possibly a 2d runway can be viewed in aerial photography. Also the remains of the Dutch Nike missile pads can be seen as round concrete pads connected to single-lane roads.

== See also ==
- Advanced Landing Ground
