= Polonne =

City in Khmelnytskyi Oblast, Ukraine

Polonne Полонне
- City
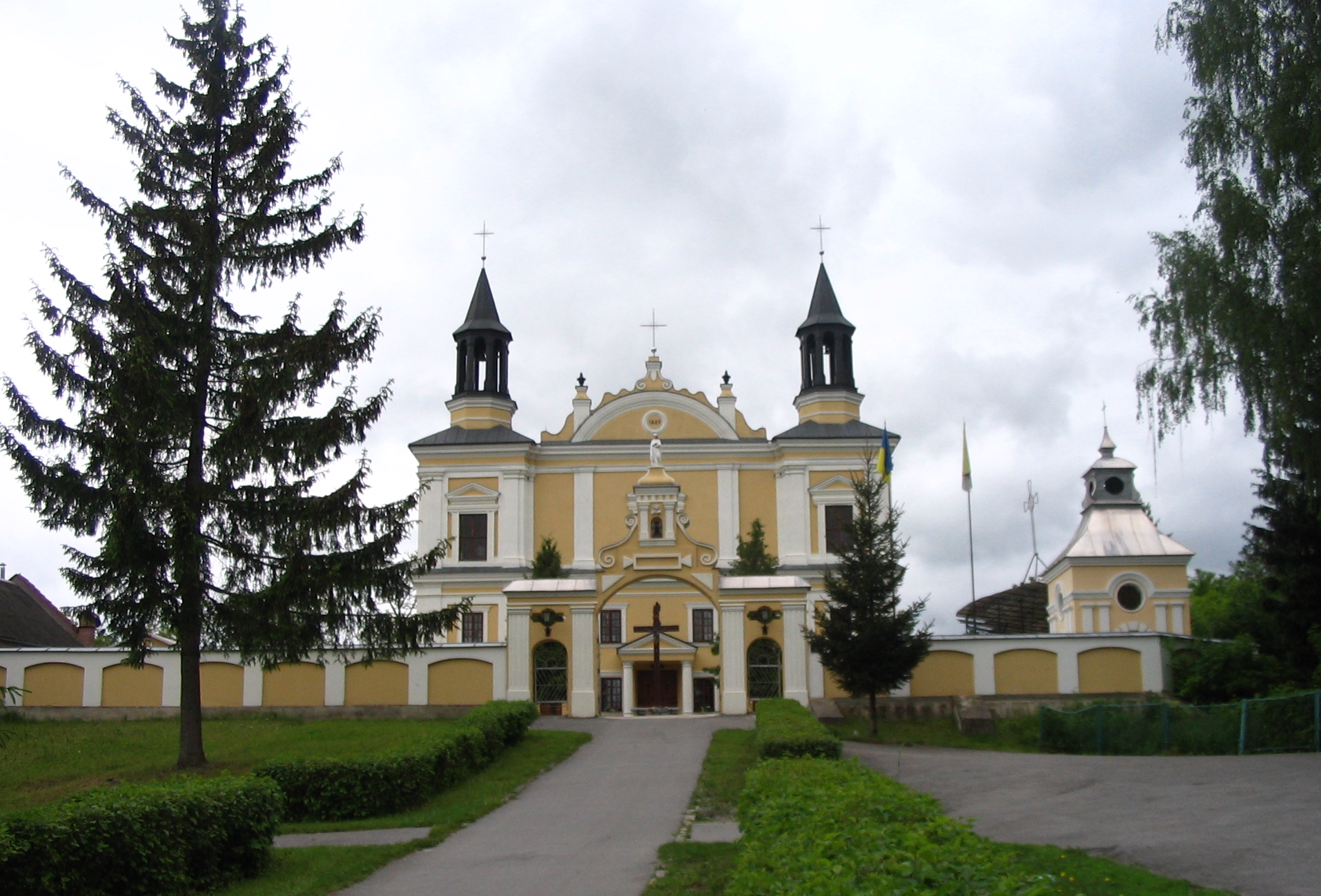
- St. Anne Church

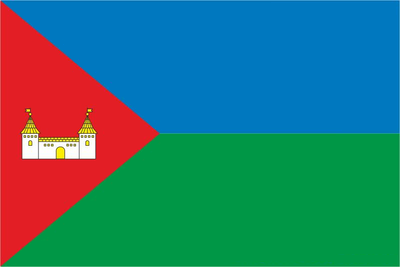
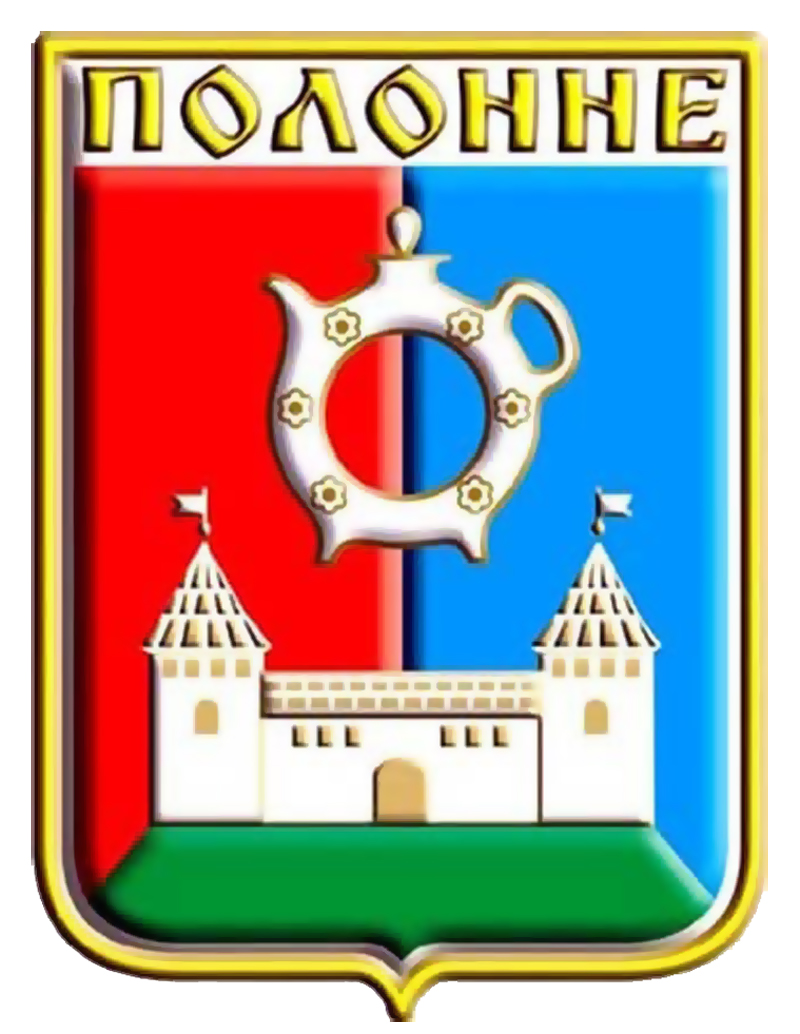
- Flag Seal

- Location within Khmelnytskyi Oblast Location within Ukraine
- Coordinates: 50°07′12″N 27°30′28″E
- Country: Ukraine
- Oblast: Khmelnytskyi Oblast
- Raion: Shepetivka Raion
- Hromada: Polonne urban hromada
- First mentioned: 996

Population (2001)
  - Total: 23,211

Polonne (Ukrainian: Полонне, IPA: [poˈlɔnːe]) is a city on the Khomora River in Shepetivka Raion, Khmelnytskyi Oblast (province) of western Ukraine. Polonne hosts the administration of Polonne urban hromada, one of the hromadas of Ukraine. The current estimated population is 20,172 (2022 estimate).

Polonne is situated in the historic region of Volhynia, on the Shepetivka-Berdychiv railroad line. Various industries within the city include porcelain, ceramic.

== History ==
Polonne has been known at least since 996, when it was first mentioned as a taxation subject in relation to Prince Volodymyr the Great's Desiatynna Church. The town was mentioned in 1169 and 1172 due to Cuman raids. In 1366, Polonne passed from Polish King Casimir III the Great to Duke Liubartas under a territorial exchange. Throughout the Middle Ages Polonne was known by its castle, also enjoying Magdeburg Rights. Later on, it was part of the Grand Duchy of Lithuania, and then the Kingdom of Poland within the Polish–Lithuanian Commonwealth. Połonne was a royal town, and afterwards a private town after it was granted to the Lubomirski family, administratively located in the Volhynian Voivodeship in the Lesser Poland Province. In 1607 Stanisław Lubomirski erected the Saint Anne church. In 1640 he fortified and armed the town and garrisoned it with 400 men. In 1648, it was captured by Cossacks led by Maksym Kryvonis, who then massacred the garrison and up to 10,000 civilians, mostly Jews (including the well-known Samson ben Pesah Ostropoli) who had taken refuge within the town's walls. In 1761, King Stanisław August Poniatowski visited the town and met with heir Kalikst Poniński. A Royal privilege of 1766 allowed Marcin Lubomirski to organize two annual fairs in Połonne. In 1790, the newly formed 3rd Artillery Brigade of the Polish Crown Army was garrisoned in Połonne.

During the Second Partition of Poland, in 1793, Polonne was annexed by Russia. During the January Uprising, on May 12, 1863, Polish insurgents led by General Edmund Różycki seized the local arsenal and rearmed, and then held trainings of the growing insurgent unit in the following days. In 1879, it had a population of 6,682. Following World War I, in 1919, it was regained by reborn Poland and administered as part of the Volhynian District until 1920, when it fell to the Soviets. In modern times it received city status in 1938.

The Jewish population was important in the town. During World War II, the Germans occupied the town kept the Jews imprisoned in a ghetto. They were guarded by Ukrainian policemen and had to do slave labor. In 1941 and 1942, hundreds of Jews are murdered in mass executions perpetrated by an Einsatzgruppe.

Until 18 July 2020, Polonne was the administrative center of Polonne Raion. The raion was abolished in July 2020 as part of the administrative reform of Ukraine, which reduced the number of raions of Khmelnytskyi Oblast to three. The area of Polonne Raion was merged into Shepetivka Raion.

== Notable people ==
- Jacob Joseph of Polonne (1710–1784)
- Peretz Markish (1895–1952), poet. A museum is dedicated to him in the old synagogue.
- Leo Mol (1915–2009), Canadian sculptor
- Isaiah Leo Sharfman (1886–1969), American economist
- Gagarin (-2023), callsign of an unknown ukrainian hero fallen in the village of Andriivka (Donetsk oblast)

== Gallery ==
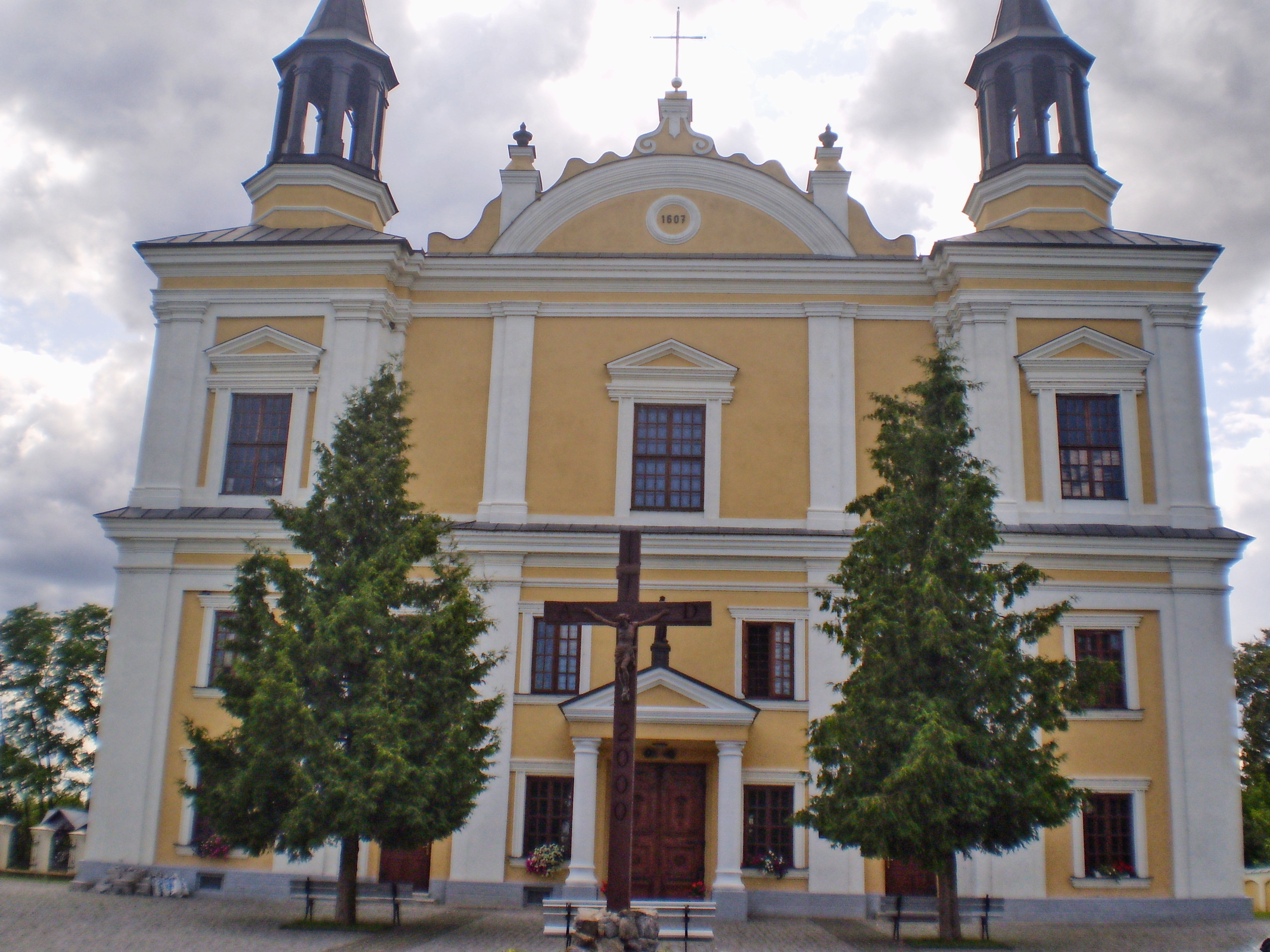
Church of St. Anne

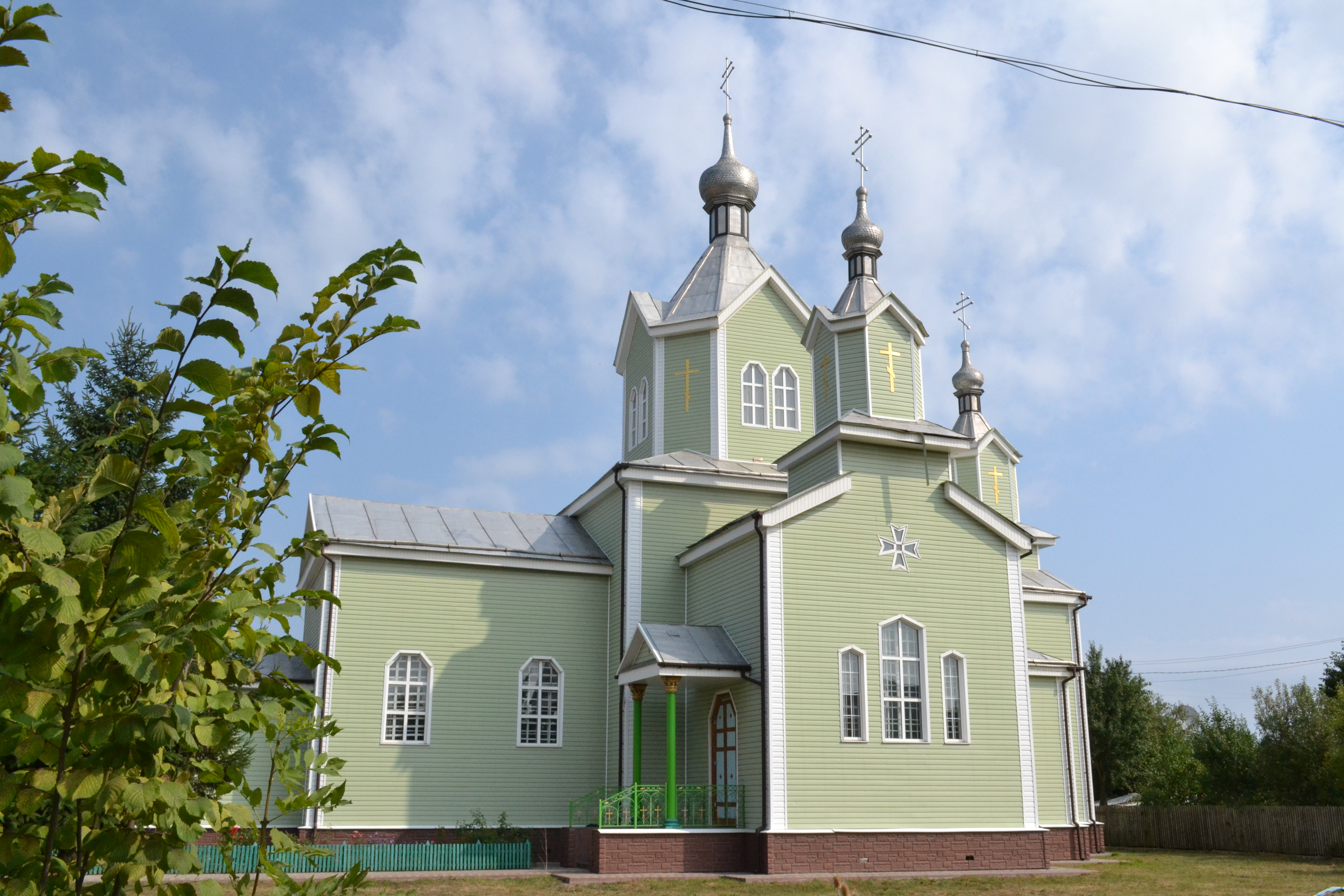
Church of the Intercession

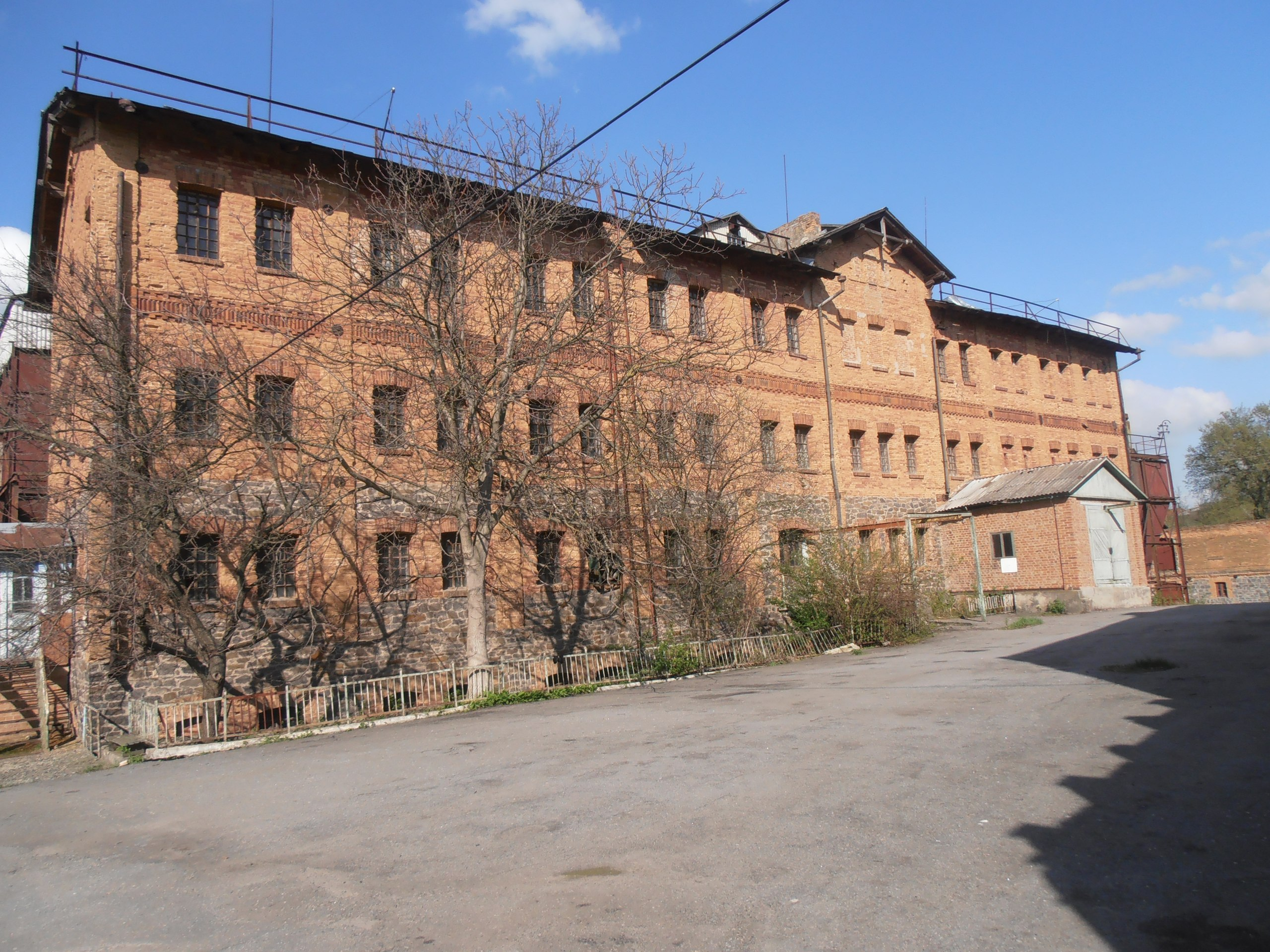
Old water mill

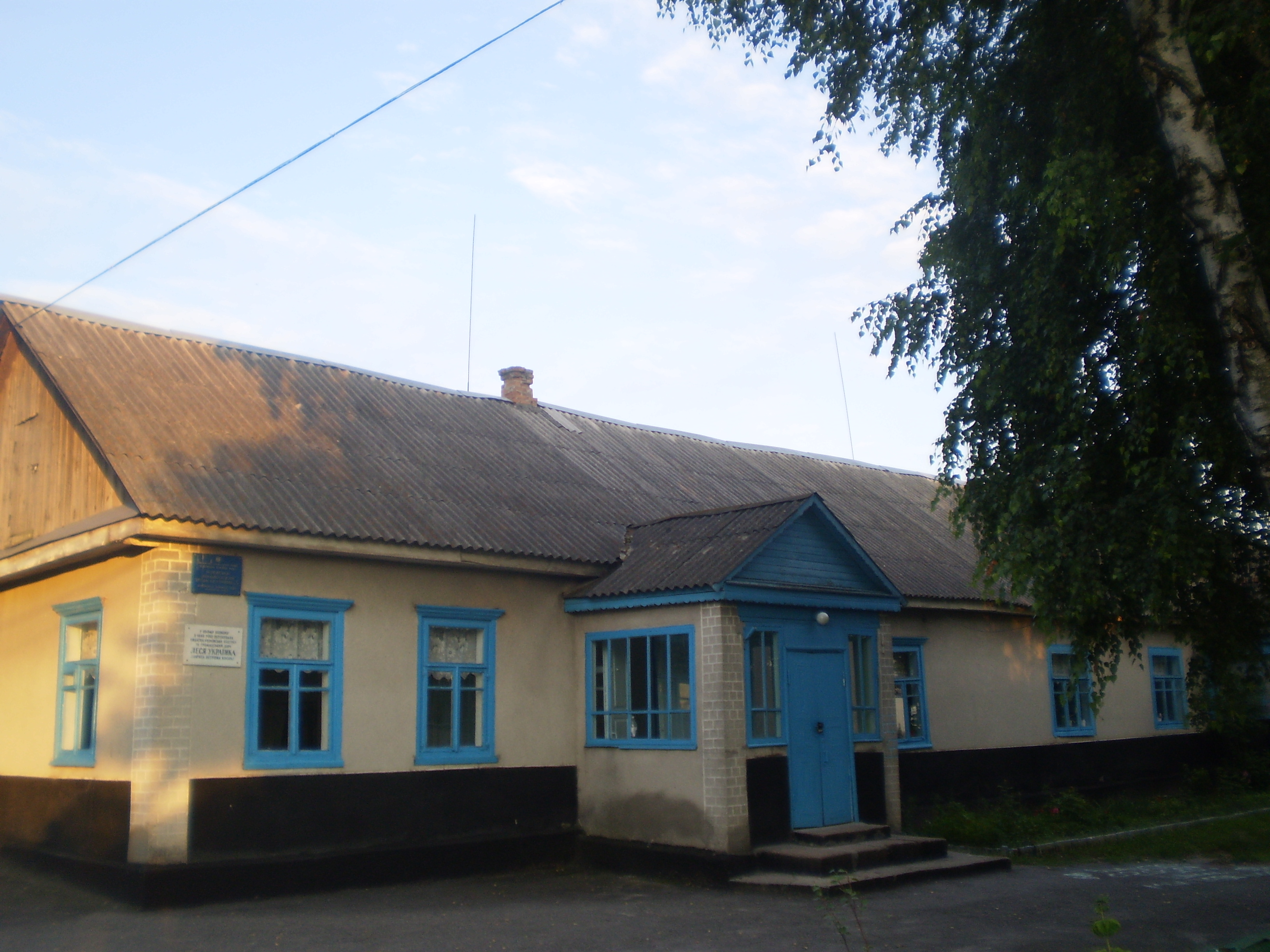
Lesya Ukrainka's house
