= Gordon Gollob =

German World War II flying ace

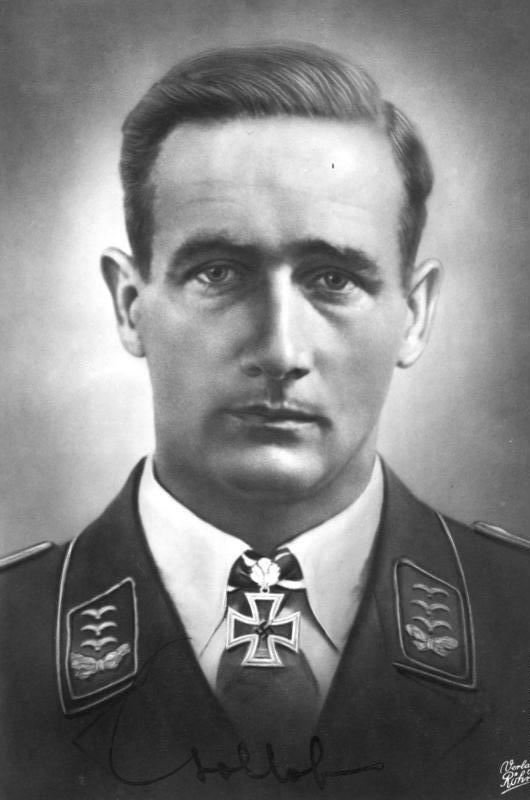
- Gollob in October 1941
- Born: 16 June 1912; Vienna, Austria-Hungary
- Died: 7 September 1987 (aged 75); Sulingen, West Germany
- Military career
- Allegiance: First Austrian Republic; Federal State of Austria; Nazi Germany
- Branch: Austrian Air Force; Luftwaffe
- Service years: 1933–1945
- Rank: Oberst
- Units: Zerstörergeschwader 76; Jagdgeschwader 54; Luftflotte 5
- Commands: Jagdgeschwader 3; Jagdgeschwader 77; Jagdfliegerführer 5
- Wars: World War II
- Awards: Knight's Cross of the Iron Cross with Oak Leaves, Swords and Diamonds

Gordon Gollob (16 June 1912 – 7 September 1987) was an Austrian fighter pilot during World War II. A fighter ace, he was credited with 150 enemy aircraft shot down in over 340 combat missions. Gollob claimed the majority of his victories over the Eastern Front, and six over the Western Front.

Gollob volunteered for military service in the Austrian Armed Forces in 1933. In March 1938, following the Anschluss, the annexation of Austria into Nazi Germany, Gollob was transferred to the Luftwaffe. In 1939, Gollob was posted to Zerstörergeschwader 76 (ZG 76—76th Destroyer Wing), a heavy fighter wing. He claimed his first aerial victory on 5 September 1939 during the invasion of Poland. Gollob claimed one victory during the Battle of the Heligoland Bight and two victories during the Norwegian Campaign. He then transferred to Jagdgeschwader 3 (JG 3—3rd Fighter Wing), flying the single-engined Messerschmitt Bf 109. In the aftermath of the Battle of Britain on the Channel Front, he claimed his sixth and final victory on the Western Front.

Gollob then fought in the aerial battles of Operation Barbarossa, the German invasion of the Soviet Union. On 27 June 1941, he was appointed commander of the II. Gruppe (2nd group) of JG 3. He claimed 18 aerial victories in August, and following his 42nd victory was awarded the Knight's Cross of the Iron Cross on 18 September. He was credited with 37 victories in October, including nine on 18 October and six on 22 October. On 26 October 1941, his total then at 85 aerial victories, Gollob was awarded the Knight's Cross of the Iron Cross with Oak Leaves. He then served at a training facility and underwent commander training. Gollob was appointed Geschwaderkommodore of Jagdgeschwader 77 (JG 77—77th Fighter Wing) on 16 May 1942. He claimed his 100th victory on 20 May, and on 23 June was awarded the Knight's Cross of the Iron Cross with Oak Leaves and Swords following his 107th aerial victory. On 29 August, Gollob became the first fighter pilot to claim 150 enemy aircraft destroyed and was awarded the Knight's Cross of the Iron Cross with Oak Leaves, Swords and Diamonds, Germany's highest military decoration at that time. (Note: In 1942, the Knight's Cross of the Iron Cross with Oak Leaves, Swords and Diamonds was second only to the Grand Cross of the Iron Cross, which was awarded only to senior commanders for winning a major battle or campaign, in the military order of the Third Reich. The Knight's Cross of the Iron Cross with Oak Leaves, Swords and Diamonds as the highest military order was surpassed on 29 December 1944 by the Knight's Cross of the Iron Cross with Golden Oak Leaves, Swords and Diamonds.)

Due to concerns that he would be killed in action, Gollob was prohibited from flying further combat missions. On 15 October 1942, he became Jagdfliegerführer 3 on the Western Front. On 6 September 1943 he was appointed as Jagdfliegerführer 5, responsible for the tactical fighter command of northwestern France. In April 1944, he was transferred to the staff of the Inspector of Fighters. In January 1945, he succeeded Generalleutnant (Major General) Adolf Galland as Inspector of Fighters, a position he held until the end of the war. In peacetime, he became General Secretary of the Federation of Independents, a right-wing political party in Austria. He worked in a sales position for the Deutz AG. Married and the father of three children, Gollob died on 7 September 1987.

== Early life and career ==
Gollob was born on 16 June 1912 in Vienna, the capital of Austria-Hungary. His father, Heinrich Gollob, worked as an academic painter. His mother, Johanna (née Reininghaus), was the daughter of Zoe von Karajan, a distant relative of Herbert von Karajan and wife of Carl Reininghaus. Gollob was the first of five children. Both his parents had studied at the Academy of Fine Arts Vienna, where they mutually befriended Gordon Mallet McCouch, an American artist of Scottish descent. McCouch was his godfather and the namesake for his first name, Gordon. Max was his middle name, not Mac, but because of McCouch, he was called "Mac". In his youth, Gollob already wanted to become an engineer and pilot. In 1930, as a student at an Oberrealschule, a secondary school, he built his first primary glider in Tirol, experimenting with it at the old airfield at Innsbruck. He also completed his A- and B-license to fly glider aircraft and became an instructor as well as a construction and airframe inspector.

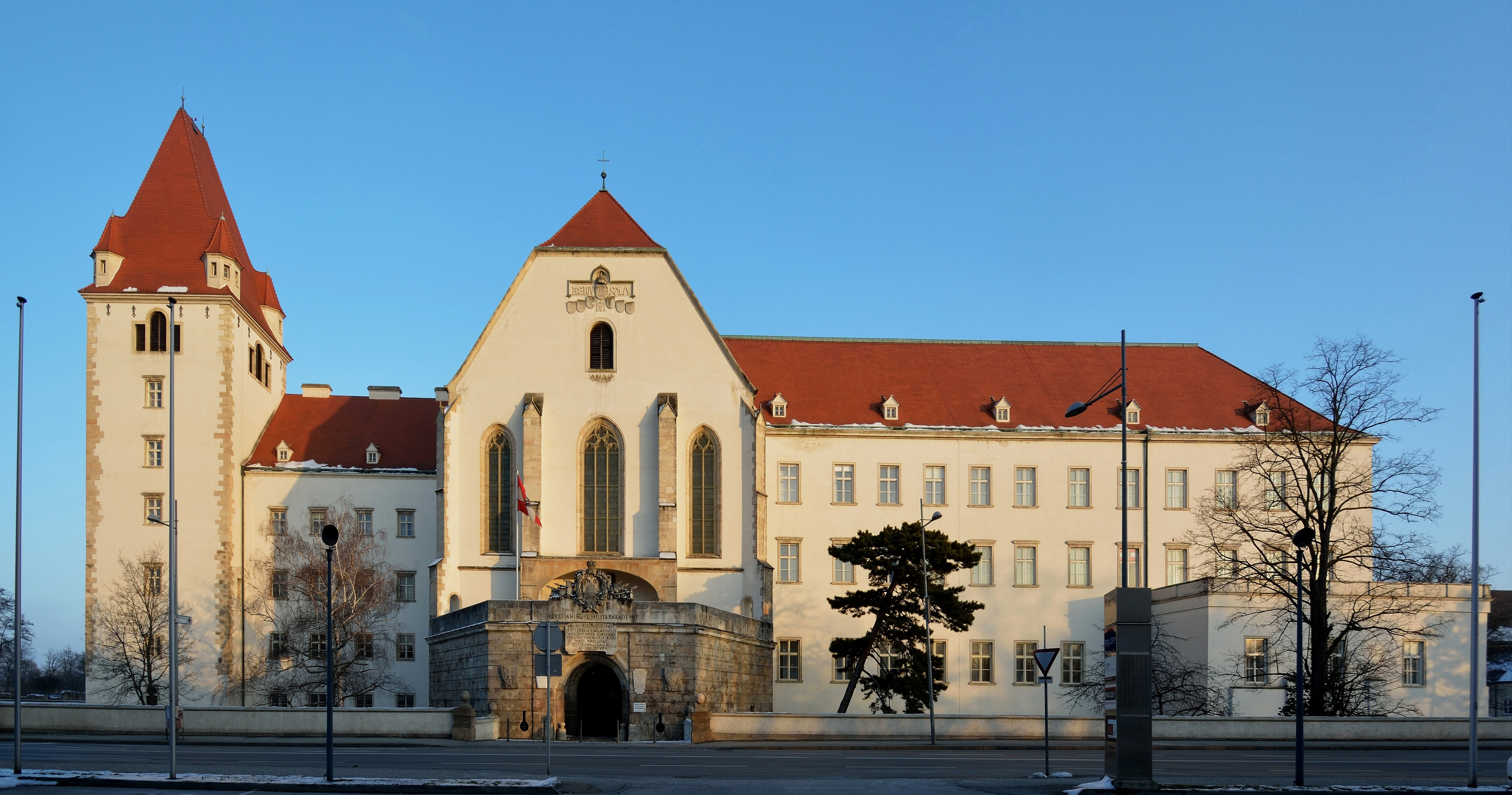
Main building of the Theresian Military Academy

Following four semesters of mechanical engineering at the University of Graz, Gollob joined the Austrian Armed Forces in 1933 as an officer cadet in the artillery. For three years he was trained at the Theresian Military Academy at Wiener Neustadt and was promoted to Leutnant (second lieutenant) on 1 September 1936. He then served as an instructor in the Austrian Air Force and commander of Schulstaffel A (Training Squadron A). Following the Anschluss in March 1938, the incorporation of Austria into Nazi Germany, Gollob was transferred to the Luftwaffe (the Nazi German Air Force). There, he was promoted to Oberleutnant (first lieutenant) on 1 June 1938. On 15 March 1939, Gollob was posted to the 3. Staffel (3rd squadron) of Zerstörergeschwader 76 (ZG 76—76th Destroyer Wing) flying the Messerschmitt Bf 110 twin-engined heavy fighter. (Note: For an explanation of Luftwaffe unit designations see Organization of the Luftwaffe during World War II.)

== World War II ==
Germany invaded Poland on 1 September 1939 starting World War II in Europe. ZG 76 had been stationed at the Polish border prior to the invasion. Gollob scored the first of his aerial victories over Poland on 5 September 1939, shooting down a PWS 56 (Podlaska Wytwórnia Samolotów—Podlasie Aircraft Factory) biplane. He also flew ground support missions, attacking an airfield and destroying several aircraft on the ground. On 21 September 1939, Gollob was awarded the Iron Cross 2nd Class (Eisernes Kreuz 2. Klasse). Following the campaign in Poland, ZG 76 was moved to Germany for defensive operations. The 1. Gruppe of ZG 76 first relocated to the Stuttgart area on 29 September 1939 to defend the western border against the French and British, who had declared war on Germany on 3 September 1939. From early October to mid-December, I. Gruppe operated from airfields in the Stuttgart and Ruhr regions before relocating north to Jever on 16 December 1939. There, on 18 December 1939, Gollob claimed his second aerial victory over a Royal Air Force (RAF) Vickers Wellington bomber in what became known as the Battle of the Heligoland Bight. During the battle, he shot down and killed Squadron Leader Archibald Guthrie, of No. 9 Squadron.

=== Invasion of Norway and Battle of Britain ===
On 8 April 1940, Gollob was appointed Staffelkapitän (squadron leader) of 3. Staffel of ZG 76. The unit took part in Operation Weserübung, Germany's assault on Denmark and Norway in the opening operation of the Norwegian Campaign. In June 1940, I. Gruppe was based at Trondheim-Værnes, when the Allied expeditionary force composed of the British, French, and Free Polish forces, were being evacuated from Narvik. In support of the evacuation, the RAF was targeting German shipping in Norwegian waters and Luftwaffe occupied airfields along the coast. On 13 June, fifteen Blackburn Skua dive bombers, six from 800 Naval Air Squadron and nine from 803 Naval Air Squadron, launched from the Royal Navy aircraft carrier Ark Royal attempted to attack the battleship Scharnhorst in the Trondheimsfjord. The flight was intercepted by the Luftwaffe and in the resulting aerial encounter, eight Skuas were shot down, the first by Gollob. That day, he was awarded the Iron Cross 1st Class (Eisernes Kreuz 1. Klasse).

Gollob then received night fighter training. At the time, he made several recommendations for technical improvement of the Messerschmitt Bf 109 single-engined fighter. Based on these recommendations, he was transferred to the Erprobungstelle Rechlin, the Luftwaffe test facility at Rechlin in June 1940. At 14:47 on 9 July 1940, Gollob intercepted and shot down Short Sunderland flying boat "Y" (N6133) from No. 201 Squadron. The Sunderland, piloted by Flight Lieutenant J.D. Middleton, was on patrol off Norway and crashed 140 kilometers (90 mi) southwest of Sumburgh Head. (Note: According to Donnelly, the Sunderland was shot down by Böhmel.) That same day at 17:20, Gollob, together with Oberfeldwebel (Staff Sergeant) Herbert Schob and Oberleutnant Gerhard Böhmel, shot down a patrolling Lockheed Hudson reconnaissance aircraft "J" (N7377) from No. 233 Squadron off Shetland. (Note: According to Donnelly, the Hudson was shot down by Schob.)

On 7 September 1940 during the Battle of Britain, Gollob was transferred to the Gruppenstab (headquarters unit) of II. Gruppe Jagdgeschwader 3 (JG 3—3rd Fighter Wing) based at Arques in northern France. On 8 October, Oberleutnant Werner Voigt, Staffelkapitän of 4. Staffel was shot down over England and taken prisoner of war. Four days later, Gollob took command of 4. Staffel. In February 1941, the entire II. Gruppe returned to Germany for a period of rest. The pilots went on a ski vacation in Kitzbühel from 9 to 28 March 1941. 4. Staffel was housed at the foot of the Ehrenbachhöhe, the highest point of the Hahnenkamm. The Gruppe then reassembled at Darmstadt-Griesheim where they received a complement of the new Bf 109 F-2 fighter aircraft. On 25 April 1941, II. Gruppe began relocating back to the English Channel Front at Monchy-Breton. The Gruppe completed relocation on 4 May and flew its first mission on 7 May 1941. That day, the RAF flew several fighter sweeps over the French coast and Gollob was credited with shooting down a Supermarine Spitfire fighter, his sixth of the war and last on the Western Front. On 1 June 1941, Gollob was promoted to Hauptmann (captain) and II. Gruppe began its relocation to the Eastern Front. The ground elements moved immediately while the air elements followed on 8 June. On that day, they flew to Saint-Dizier and then to Böblingen. On the following day, they continued to Breslau-Gandau, now the Wrocław–Copernicus Airport in Poland, via Straubing.

=== War against the Soviet Union ===
In preparation for Operation Barbarossa, the German invasion of the Soviet Union, II. Gruppe headed further east on 18 June. Following a stopover at Kraków, the unit was moved to Hostynne. At the start of the campaign, JG 3 under the command of Major (Major) Günther Lützow was subordinated to the 5th Air Corps, under the command of General der Flieger (General of the Aviators) Robert Ritter von Greim, itself part of Luftflotte 4 (4th Air Fleet), under the command of Generaloberst (Colonel General) Alexander Löhr. These air elements supported Generalfeldmarschall (Field Marshal) Gerd von Rundstedt's Army Group South, with the objective of capturing Ukraine and its capital Kiev. At 17:00 on 21 June 1941, the 5th Air Corps, based at Lipsko, briefed the various unit commanders of the upcoming attack. (Note: All times used in this section are Central European Time unless otherwise noted.) That evening, Gruppenkommandeur (group commander) of II. Gruppe Lothar Keller informed his subordinates of the attack.

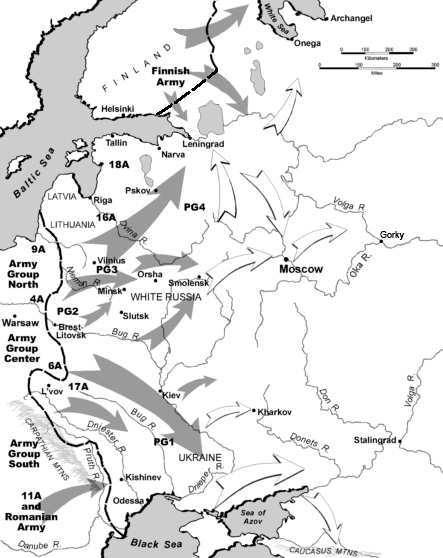
Map indicating Operation Barbarossa's attack plan

The invasion of the Soviet Union began on 22 June 1941. II. Gruppe flew its first missions on the Eastern Front shortly before 04:00, flying low attacks against Soviet airfields in the vicinity of Lvov in Ukraine. At 06:30 the Gruppe fought its first aerial battles. 4. Staffel claimed three victories and the Gruppenstab four. One of these victories was credited to Gollob, who claimed a Polikarpov I-16 fighter shot down at 07:00. On 25 June, II. Gruppe claimed 17 victories, 6 of which were credited to 4. Staffel. The Staffel engaged Ilyushin DB-3 bombers escorted by I-16 "Ratas" on a free chase mission west of Lutsk. The Soviet bombers targeted the German advance roads from Hrubieszów through Volodymyr-Volynskyi to Lusk. Gollob was credited with two victories over DB-3s in this encounter. On 26 June 1941, Gruppenkommandeur Keller was killed in a mid-air collision. The next day, Gollob succeeded Keller in this position and turned over command of 4. Staffel to Oberleutnant Karl Faust. In the beginning of July 1941, the front in the vicinity of the northern sector of Army Group South became increasingly fluid. This necessitated the relocation of II. Gruppe to Volodymyr-Volynskyi. By this time the war of attrition had reduced the Gruppe to 50 percent of its authorized strength. One reason for this was the almost complete lack of new aircraft or of engines and other spare parts. Another factor was overwork of the ground crews and signs of exhaustion were apparent. Flying combat air patrols over Berdychiv and Zhytomyr on 1 July, II. Gruppe claimed four victories. On this day at 19:42, Gollob claimed his tenth aerial victory over a Petlyakov Pe-2 light bomber. The following day, the Gruppe claimed 23 aerial victories for the loss of one in combat. The first victory of the day was claimed by Gollob who shot down a ZKB-19—a German alias for the Polikarpov I-17 fighter, possibly a misidentified Mikoyan-Gurevich MiG-1 or Mikoyan-Gurevich MiG-3—at 05:52 in the morning. On another mission that day, he claimed two Vultee V-11 attack aircraft shot down at 11:30 and 11:43.

The rapid advance of German ground forces required II. Gruppe to move to Lutsk on 5 July, then to Dubno that evening and to Miropol on 10 July. Flying missions east of Zhytomyr, Gollob claimed his 14th victory over a Polikarpov I-153 at 06:30 on 13 July 1941. A victory over a DB-3 at 11:42 and a further victory over a Tupolev SB-2 bomber at 11:44, both claimed on 16 July, took his total to 16 aerial victories. On 20 July 1941, II. Gruppe relocated from Miropol to Berdychiv. One day later, Gollob was awarded the Honor Goblet of the Luftwaffe (Ehrenpokal der Luftwaffe) for 16 aerial victories. On 23 July 1941 at 16:35, Gollob claimed a Polikarpov R-5 reconnaissance bomber, his 17th aerial victory. That day, II. Gruppe received orders to turn over its remaining aircraft to I. Gruppe of Jagdgeschwader 53 (JG 53—53rd Fighter Wing). Gollob's Gruppe was re-equipped with the Bf 109 F-4. On 28 July, the pilots were flown to Krosno on a Junkers Ju 52 where they received a full complement of Bf 109 F-4s. After a single familiarization flight, they departed to Berdychiv and on the following morning they were transferred to Bila Tserkva. During the first days in August 1941, II. Gruppe flew missions over the combat areas along the Dnieper in support of the main German attack to encircle Soviet forces near Uman, approximately 200 km (120 mi) south of Kiev. Most II. Gruppe missions were subsequently in the greater Kiev area and to the north near Malyn, where Soviet forces were still holding onto the west bank of the Dnieper. Until 6 August 1941, II. Gruppe claimed five victories without loss. Two victories claimed on 5 August took Gollob's total to 20 aerial victories. He was victorious over a I-153 at 17:46 and a I-17 at 18:22.

On 7 August, II. Gruppe moved again, from Bila Tserkva the Gruppe moved to Signajewka, a forward airfield near Shpola. In the days to come, the Gruppe flew combat missions over the Dnieper, between Kaniv and Kremenchuk as well to the south. Flying from Signajewka for the next 10 days, II. Gruppe claimed 64 aerial victories, including 11 on 8 August, 7 on 9 August, 8 on 12 August and 27 on 17 August 1941, the Gruppe's most successful day of the entire 1941 summer campaign. In the same timeframe, Gollob increased his tally of aerial victories to 26. II. Gruppe had to relocate again to keep up with the German advance. On the afternoon of 17 August parts of the air elements flew to Kirovohrad-North airfield. Their primary mission was to protect the armored spearheads in the Dnipropetrovsk area. On 21 August 1941, II. Gruppe claimed 17 victories, five of which were by Gollob. This "ace-in-a-day" achievement, the first of six during his combat career, took his total to 33 aerial victories. On 25 August, III Army Corps took Dnipropetrovsk and captured the first bridgehead across the Dnieper. Until the end of August 1941, II. Gruppe primary objective was to help secure the bridgehead on the east bank of the Dnieper. In support of these battles, Gollob scored a I-17 on 22 August, a Polikarpov I-180 fighter aircraft on 24 August and a Tupolev TB-3 heavy bomber on 31 August 1941, taking his total to 36 aerial victories. On 1 September 1941, the 17th Army began crossing the Dnieper in force and II. Gruppe was moved to Myronivka. Flying from Myronivka was characterized by poor weather conditions with rain and fog, as a result operations were kept to a minimum. At the time, II. Gruppe's primary objective was the defense of the Dnieper crossing. In these defensive battles, Gollob score his 37th victory on 8 September. His opponent was classified as an I-26 fighter aircraft, later referred to as Yakovlev Yak-1. One day later, he claimed an Ilyushin Il-2 ground-attack aircraft. On 12 September weather conditions improved and flight operations increased. II. Gruppe flew missions in support of the armored spearheads as well as fighter escort missions for Junkers Ju 87 dive bombers. That day, Gollob claimed two victories, an Il-2 and a I-26, taking his total to 40 aerial victories. On 13 September, the Gruppe claimed 20 victories over Soviet bombers and ground-attack aircraft, including a V-11 shot down by Gollob at 17:19. On 14 September 1941, the German airfield at Myronivka came under Soviet air attack. Following the attack, Gollob and his wingman Oberleutnant Walther Dahl managed to pursue the attackers, and both shot down one of them. This victory over an I-153 claimed at 05:47 in the morning took his total to 42 aerial victories. II. Gruppe was again forced to relocate, on 15 September it moved to an airfield at Kremenchuk. On 18 September, Gollob was awarded the Knight's Cross of the Iron Cross (Ritterkreuz des Eisernen Kreuzes) for 42 victories. On 19 September 1941, II. Gruppe was tasked with strafing Soviet airfields in the Poltava area. That day, Gollob claimed his 43rd aerial victory over an R-5 at 13:55. He became an "ace-in-a-day" again on 28 September 1941 which took his score to 48 aerial victories. That day he had claimed three Pe-2s and two I-61s, a designation for the MiG-1 fighter aircraft.

=== Battle of Moscow and Crimean Campaign ===
On 30 September 1941, the Gruppe was temporarily transferred from the southern sector of the Eastern Front. Their new area of operation was Sechtschinskaja, approximately 40 km (25 mi) southeast of Roslavl. The Gruppe was then subordinated to the 2nd Air Corps under the command of General der Flieger Bruno Loerzer and was part of the preparations for Operation Typhoon, the planned assault on Moscow. All available German forces were concentrated under the command of Generalfeldmarschall Fedor von Bock's Army Group Centre for the attack which began on 2 October 1941. In the first days of this campaign, II. Gruppe supported the advance northeast by 4th Panzer Group and the 4th Army towards Vyazma and Yukhnov. Predominantly flying escort missions for Ju 87 dive bombers and combat air patrols over the battle zone east of Desna, Gollob claimed one enemy aircraft shot down on 4 October and two more the following day, including his 50th aerial victory over a I-61.

Gollob claimed two Pe-2s shot down on 6 October, the first at 10:15 and the second two hours later. The following day, he was victorious over two further Pe-2s and one Il-2, taking his total to 56 aerial victories. On that night, the first snow fell, worsening road conditions. By 9 October German units had encircled major Soviet forces in two separate pockets at Vyazma and Bryansk. In support of German ground forces, II. Gruppe detached a Schwärme—two pairs of two fighter aircraft—to a forward airfield at Syevsk, approximately 100 km (62 mi) south of Bryansk. From 9 to 11 October the air elements operated from the Kirov and Oryol airfields, which had been captured by German forces on 3 October. Operating from these airfields, Gollob claimed his 57th and 58th victories on 10 October, both aircraft were I-61s shot down at 12:40 and 12:43. The missions on 11 October 1941 were II. Gruppe's last in support of Operation Typhoon. Orders had been received to transfer the air element and a small technical ground crew detachment, which was airlifted by several Ju 52s to Chaplynka. From there, the Gruppe participated in the Crimean Campaign, the conquest of the Crimean peninsula. The transfer began on 13 October, but due to bad weather conditions, it was only completed on 16 October. At Chaplynka, the Gruppe was placed under the command of the Geschwaderstab (headquarters unit) of Jagdgeschwader 77 (JG 77—77th Fighter Wing).

The first missions over the battle zone in front of Perekop and over the Crimea were flown on 17 October 1941, either flying Ju 87 escort missions or combat air patrols. On two separate missions that day, Gollob claimed two I-61s and one I-16 shot down. On 18 October 1941, the 11the Army began its attack on the Isthmus of Perekop and Ishun. II. Gruppe flew several combat air patrols that day and reported 16 aerial victories for the loss of two Bf 109s damaged in combat. Gollob alone accounted for nine of these 16 claimed victories. This was the third time he had become an "ace-in-a-day" and was the most successful day of his combat career. During the course of three combat missions, he increased his personal score to 70. That day he filed a claim for nine I-61s shot down, two at 07:18 and 07:20, five more at 10:05, 10:07, 10:19, 10:20 and 10:29 and two more at 14:46 and 14:48. On 19 October, Gollob again achieved "ace-in-a-day" for the fourth time, claiming a I-61 at 08:55, three P-2s at 12:36, 12:37 and 12:42, and another I-61 at 15:35. The next day, he was credited with one further I-61, taking his total to 76 victories. Two days later, on 22 October, Gollob made "ace-in-a-day" for the fifth time and surpassed eighty victories. That day he claimed three I-16s, one Pe-2 and one I-61. One day later, he claimed three aerial victories, all I-61s, and on 24 October, he was credited with his 85th victory after he shot down a I-153. Following this streak of 37 aerial victories in October 1941, he was awarded the Knight's Cross of the Iron Cross with Oak Leaves (Ritterkreuz des Eisernen Kreuzes mit Eichenlaub) after reaching 85 victories. He was the 38th member of the German armed forces to be so honored. Gollob, together with Oberleutnant Erbo Graf von Kageneck, received the Oak Leaves from Adolf Hitler personally at the Wolf's Lair, Hitler's headquarters in Rastenburg, present-day Kętrzyn in Poland, on 5 November 1941.

On 31 October 1941, II. Gruppe flew its last combat missions over the northern Crimea. The Gruppe was then ordered to return to Germany, to be stationed at the Wiesbaden-Erbenheim airfield where it arrived in early November. Prior to departure, all of the remaining aircraft where handed over to III. Gruppe of JG 77. Since the start of Operation Barbarossa on 22 June 1941, II. Gruppe had claimed 504 aerial victories for the loss of ten pilots killed or missing in action, and a further nine pilots who had been injured. In addition, 27 aircraft were lost or damaged beyond repair, a further 21 aircraft received heavy damaged and another 27 were lightly damaged. On 20 November 1941, Gollob was again posted to the central Erprobungstelle Rechlin primary Luftwaffe test facility. Gollob was replaced by Hauptmann Karl-Heinz Krahl as commander of II. Gruppe of JG 3. At Rechlin, he flew numerous test and comparison flights with the latest version of the Bf 109 and Focke-Wulf Fw 190 fighter aircraft, as well as a variety of types which never went beyond a prototype variant.

=== Wing Commander ===
In early 1942, the General der Jagdflieger (General of Fighters), Oberst (Colonel) Adolf Galland recommended Gollob for the Geschwaderkommodore (wing commander) position of JG 77. Gollob was sent to the Geschwaderstab of Jagdgeschwader 54 (JG 54—54th Fighter Wing) as a commander-in-training under Major Hannes Trautloft. On 1 May 1942, Gollob was officially appointed Geschwaderkommodore of JG 77, replacing Major Gotthard Handrick. He took operational command of the Geschwader after he arrived on 16 May 1942. On the same day of his arrival, Gollob flew his first combat mission as Geschwaderkommodore. That day, he claimed his aerial victories 87 to 89, shooting down three Lavochkin-Gorbunov-Gudkov LaGG-3 fighter aircraft. Gollob's success continued the following day, when he was credited with three R-5s and one LaGG-3 destroyed.

Herzas (Ace of Hearts) emblem of JG 77

JG 77 had been given the task of supporting the German ground forces in the Crimean Campaign over the Kerch Strait on the Crimean Peninsula. An anonymous JG 77 pilot described Gollob's methods; "Gollob flew from Kerch together with his wingman. They positioned themselves at a low altitude beneath a Soviet formation. Then they started climbing in spirals, carefully maintaining their position beneath the enemy formation. Before the peacefully flying Soviets had even suspected any mischief, the two planes at the bottom of their formation had been shot down and the two Germans were gone." On 18 May 1942, Gollob claimed his 94th to 96th aerial victories over Kerch and the Caucasus coast; all three were Polikarpov R-5 reconnaissance bombers. JG 77, led by Gollob, and its I. Gruppe, led by Hauptmann Heinrich Bär, were engaged in an intense rivalry, each striving to outperform the other, and both eager to achieve the century mark first. Bär claimed his 100th aerial victory on 19 May. That day, Gollob claimed three more R-5 shot down, taking his total to 99 aerial victories. One day later, on 20 May 1942, Gollob shot down two aircraft, a DB-3 and a LaGG-3, and thereby exceeded 100 aerial victories. He was the 10th Luftwaffe pilot to achieve the century mark.

On 7 June 1942, German and Romanian forces began Operation Störfang, the final assault in the siege of Sevastopol, which resulted in the city's capture on 4 July 1942. On the first day of this operation, Gollob claimed his 102nd victory, a LaGG-3 shot down over Sevastopol. The attack on Sevastopol was still making slow progress on 9 June, largely due to the artillery deployed within the fortress. Over the battle zone, Gollob claimed a I-153 shot down that day. Gollob did not claim any further victories until 18 June. The fighting over Sevastopol was still ongoing and Gollob claimed an Il-2 and a LaGG-3 over the southern sector of Sevastopol. These two victories took his total to 105. On 21 June 1942, Gollob was credited with two victories over LaGG-3 fighter aircraft. For this achievement, on 23 June, he was awarded the Knight's Cross of the Iron Cross with Oak Leaves and Swords (Ritterkreuz des Eisernen Kreuzes mit Eichenlaub und Schwertern), after his score had increased to 107 aerial victories. This was the 13th presentation of this award. On 1 July 1942, he was promoted to Major.

On 22 July 1942, the Geschwaderkommodore of Jagdgeschwader 52 (JG 52—52nd Fighter Wing), Major Herbert Ihlefeld, was severely injured in a flight accident and had to surrender command during his convalescence. At the time, all three Gruppen of JG 77 were lent out to other units, and Gollob had time to spare, so temporarily took over command of JG 52 as acting Geschwaderkommodore. On this or one of the following days, he departed and flew to the Geschwaderstab of JG 52. On 28 June 1942, the Wehrmacht had initiated Fall Blau (Case Blue), the 1942 strategic summer offensive in southern Russia. The objective was to secure the oil fields of Baku as well as an advance in the direction of Stalingrad along the Volga River, to cover the flanks of the advance towards Baku. Tasked with aerial support of this offensive was Luftflotte 4 to which JG 52 was subordinated. By the time Gollob joined the Geschwader in late July 1942, the offensive had been renamed Operation Braunschweig and JG 52 was located at Rostov-on-Don. While serving with JG 52, Gallob had Unteroffizier Viktor Petermann assigned as his wingman. Gollob claimed his first victory with the Stab of JG 52 on 26 July 1942, a I-16 and his 108th in total. The next day, he shot down two I-153 biplane fighters. He claimed the first aerial victory of August 1942, his last month of combat operations, on 4 August over a Yakovlev Yak-1 fighter aircraft. He was then credited with four victories on 6 August, two Il-2, one Yak-1 and one R-5 took his score to 115 aerial victories. He claimed one Yak-1 on each of the next two days. On 14 August, he was credited with two LaGG-3 and one Douglas A-20 Havoc, referred to as a Boston. For the last time in his combat career, Gollob achieved "ace-in-a-day" for the sixth time on 16 August 1941. That day he claimed two LaGG-3, two I-16 and one Il-2. His success as a fighter pilot continued, as he shot down two LaGG-3 on 17 August, three I-16 on 18 August, and two Il-2 and an I-153 on 19 August, taking his overall total to 133 aerial victories.

Following three victories on 20 August, two I-153 and a I-16, Gollob shot down two Bostons on 22 August. On 24 August 1941, he took his total to 142 aerial victories by claiming three LaGG-3 and one Boston. Over the course of the next four days, he scored one victory on each day, a Boston on 25 August, a Pe-2 on 26 August, a I-16 on 27 August, and another Boston on 28 August. After three victories over LaGG-3s and one Pe-2 on 29 August 1942, he reached 150 aerial victories and became the Luftwaffe's highest scoring pilot at that point. For this he was awarded the Knight's Cross of the Iron Cross with Oak Leaves, Swords and Diamonds (Ritterkreuz des Eisernen Kreuzes mit Eichenlaub, Schwertern und Brillanten) on 30 August. Gollob was the third member of the Wehrmacht and the third fighter pilot who had received this award. Fearing he would be lost in combat, Hitler imposed a flying ban on him. Der Adler, a biweekly Nazi propaganda magazine published by the Luftwaffe, also reported his actions in volume 19 of 1942. On 30 September 1942, Gollob was officially replaced in command of JG 77 by Hauptmann Joachim Müncheberg. Gollob was then posted to the Stab of Jagdfliegerführer 3 (Jafü 3—3rd Fighter Pilot Leader) at Brest-Guipavas on the English Channel Front.

=== High command ===
On 15 October 1942, Gollob was made Jagdfliegerführer 3, responsible for tactical fighter command over northwestern France. Jagdfliegerführer 3 was renamed Jagdfliegerführer 5 (Jafü 5—5th Fighter Pilot Leader) on 6 September 1943. In this command position, he was promoted to Oberstleutnant (lieutenant colonel) on 20 April 1943, effective as of 1 April, and to Oberst on 1 May 1944. When he became Jafü 5 he frequently submitted reports to his superiors at the 5. Jagd-Division (5th Fighter Division) about the suitability of the Bf 109 on the Western Front. He indicated that in its present state the Bf 109 G-3 to G-6 were no longer adequate for service in the West and that the Fw 190 and Bf 109 were inferior to enemy aircraft. Learning about the Messerschmitt Me 262 jet-powered aircraft, Gollob became a strong advocate of it and its employment as fighter aircraft. Hitler had become interested in the idea of using the Me 262 in a fighter-bomber role, which contributed to the delays in preparing the aircraft for operational readiness as an interceptor.

"I appointed him to my staff and entrusted him with full responsibilities for the preparation and planning for operational employment of the Me 262 and Me 163. Gollob did not tackle the task to my satisfaction. He was interested only in the purely technical aspects, neglecting ground organization, the training of air- and groundcrews, setting up a communications network and the information of operational units. This caused considerable friction between Gollob, myself and my staff."

— Adolf Galland, General der Jagdflieger

In April 1944, Gollob was transferred to the personal staff of General der Jagdflieger Galland, to advise on the development of the Me 262 jet and Messerschmitt Me 163 rocket aircraft projects. Gollob quarrelled with Galland in September and was transferred to Kommando der Erprobungstellen (headquarters of test units), which two years previously had been put under the command of Oberst Edgar Petersen. Gollob was also involved in the development and testing of the FuG 217 Neptun "J2" and FuG 218 Neptun "J3" airborne radar specifically for single-engined night fighters and air-to-air rockets, such as the R4M. In November 1944, Gollob was appointed commander of the Jäger-Sonderstab—or special fighter command—for the Ardennes offensive and the ill-fated Operation Bodenplatte. On 11 November, Reichsmarschall (Marshal of the Reich) Hermann Göring, the Commander-in-Chief of the Oberkommando der Luftwaffe (Air Force High Command), organized a meeting of high-ranking Luftwaffe officers, including Gollob. The meeting, also referred to as the "Areopag" was held at the Luftkriegsakademie (air war academy) at Berlin-Gatow. This Luftwaffe version of the Greek Areopagus—a court of justice—aimed at finding solutions to the deteriorating air war situation over Germany. On 15 November, Gollob and Leutnant Karl Schnörrer, Hauptmann Heinz Strüning, Major Georg Christl, Major Rudolf Schoenert, Major Josef Fözö formed the guard of honor at Walter Nowotny funeral at the Zentralfriedhof in Vienna. Nowotny had been killed in action on 8 November while evaluating the Me 262 under combat conditions. The eulogy was delivered by Generaloberst Otto Deßloch.

Reichsführer-SS Heinrich Himmler had suggested to Hitler that he appoint Gollob as General der Jagdflieger. Himmler's intervention in Luftwaffe affairs had been an irritation to Göring. Himmler had ambitions to expand his influence and power base into the Luftwaffe. One aspect of this was to put jet fighter units under control of the SS and later, Göring ordered Galland to prepare a report on Gollob. Galland's conclusion was that Gollob required close supervision in a responsible post. In early January 1945, Göring summoned Gollob to Karinhall, Göring's estate northeast of Berlin, and read out selected excerpts from Galland's report to him and Gollob became infuriated with Galland. Göring then ordered Galland to Karinhall and informed him of his dismissal. During the meeting, Göring postponed his decision as to what position Galland would receive and sent Galland on vacation. News of Galland's dismissal soon spread, leading to the failed Fighter Pilots' Revolt, an insurrection of a small group of high-ranking Luftwaffe pilots, including Oberst Johannes Steinhoff who after the war became Chairman of the NATO Military Committee, aimed at re-instating Galland as General der Jagdflieger. On 31 January 1945, Gollob was officially appointed as General der Jagdflieger.

In his new role, Gollob worked with General der Flieger Josef Kammhuber, responsible for fighting against the enemy four-engined bombers, and SS-Obergruppenführer Hans Kammler, responsible for air armament and manufacturing of the Me 262. Gollob's objective was to deploy and arm the Me 262 as a defensive weapon against the Allied air offensive. Hitler's decision to use the Me 262 in a fighter bomber role had not been revised. Gollob gathered data and hoped to meet Hitler to convince him that the Me 262 was better suited as a fighter aircraft and not as a fighter bomber, but this meeting never occurred. On 7 April 1945, frustrated over the lack of progress made, Gollob submitted his written request to be released from office as General der Jagdflieger, but the request was not approved by Göring. Gollob left Berlin on 10 April 1945 after his staff had left for southern Germany. At that time he needed urgent hospitalization to treat his appendicitis. Gollob underwent surgery by Prof. Dr. Burghard Breitner at a hospital in Igls, in the present-day a borough of Innsbruck, eight days after his departure from Berlin. On 24 April, he was transferred to the Luftwaffe hospital at Kitzbühel, which was in the middle of the so-called Alpine Fortress. At Kitzbühel, he met with the last Commander-in-Chief of the Luftwaffe, Generalfeldmarschall Greim and the female pilot Hanna Reitsch. Greim was convalescing from an injury sustained during a flight by Reitsch into the encircled city of Berlin on 26 April. At Kitzbühel, Gollob was taken prisoner of war by elements of the 36th Infantry Division of the United States Army under the command of General John E. Dahlquist. Shortly after, he was transferred into the custody of the US 42nd Infantry Division commanded by Major General Harry J. Collins.

== Later life ==
On 1 June 1945, Gollob, who had been released on parole, was arrested by the Austrian Gendarmerie acting for the US authorities. From Kitzbühel, he was taken via Pass Strub, and other internment camps, to Ludwigsburg in Württemberg, and then flown to England. In England, he was held at Latimer and interrogated at the Combined Services Detailed Interrogation Centre regarding combat operations. He was released by US forces in 1946 and was then interned by the French authorities, as his home region of North Tyrol had become part of the French Occupation Zone. After release, Gollob made a living by contributing to aircraft magazines and lecturing.

In 1948, Gollob became General Secretary of the Federation of Independents (German: Verband der Unabhängigen, VdU), a right-wing political party in Austria. Gollob adhered to strongly German nationalist viewpoints. In June 1950 he caused a public scandal, when he spoke at a public rally held by the Styrian organization of the VdU in Graz. Gollob had criticized the anti-Nazi legislation and called the Austrian Government a "fake democracy". As a consequence the Styrian party organization was banned by the Austrian government to avoid a ban of the party as a whole by the Allied Council. For the same reason the party at first suspended and on 20 July 1950 expelled Gollob from the party. This resulted in a bitter strife between the party's factions. Gollob's expulsion was revoked. On 1 October 1950 he was elected to be one of the deputies of party leader Herbert Kraus. In 1951 Gollob moved to Germany.

"Well, I will say this, then I will say nothing else about Gollob. Losses soared under his leadership everywhere he went, much like Göring in the first war. He placed leaders in command of units not because of their competence, but due to their loyalty to the Nazi Party, which were very few in the Jagdwaffe."

— Johannes Steinhoff, Chairman of the NATO Military Committee

Gollob and his wife Elisabeth Lüning, had married on 14 February 1943, and had two sons and a daughter. Their first son, Ulrik, was born on 30 November 1943 in Kitzbühel, their second son, Gerald was born on 9 January 1946, also in Kitzbühel, and their daughter Cornelia was born on 16 March 1954 in Sulingen. The family had moved to his wife's hometown of Sulingen. There, from November 1951, he started working in a sales role for the Klöckner Humboldt Deutz AG, a company making motors and vehicles. Until a myocardial infarction impeded his health in 1975, he regularly flew powered and glider aircraft. Gollob died in Sulingen, Diepholz, Lower Saxony on 7 September 1987.

== Summary of career ==
=== Aerial victory claims ===
According to US historian David T. Zabecki, Gollob was credited with 150 aerial victories. Spick also lists Gollob with 150 aerial victories claimed in 340 combat missions, 144 of which were on the Eastern Front, and a mission-to-claim ratio of 2.27. He never lost a wingman in combat, nor was he shot down. Mathews and Foreman, authors of Luftwaffe Aces — Biographies and Victory Claims, researched the German Federal Archives and found records for 146 aerial victory claims, plus five further unconfirmed claims. This number includes one claim over a Polish Air Force aircraft, five aerial victory claims on the Western Front, and 140 Soviet Air Forces piloted aircraft on the Eastern Front.

Chronicle of aerial victories
This and the ♠ (Ace of spades) indicates those aerial victories which made Gollob an "ace-in-a-day", a term which designates a fighter pilot who has shot down five or more airplanes in a single day. This and the – (dash) indicates unconfirmed aerial victory claims for which Gollob did not receive credit. This and the ! (exclamation mark) indicates those aerial victories listed by Prien, Stemmer, Rodeike and Bock. This and the # (hash mark) indicates those aerial victories listed by Mathews and Foreman.
Claim!	Claim#	Date	Time	Type	Location	Claim!	Claim#	Date	Time	Type	Location
– I. Gruppe of Zerstörergeschwader 76 –
	—	2 September 1939	16:30	PZL P.24	vicinity of Łódź	3	3	13 June 1940	02:00	Skua	Trondheim
1	1	5 September 1939	10:35	PWS-26	southwest of Łódź	4	4	9 July 1940	14:20	Sunderland	140 km (87 mi) southwest of Sumburgh
2	2	18 December 1939	14:45	Wellington	north of Langeoog	5	5	9 July 1940	17:20	Hudson	west of Bergen
– 4. Staffel of Jagdgeschwader 3 –
6	6	7 May 1941	11:25	Spitfire	Gravelines	8	8	25 June 1941	09:00	DB-3	west of Lutsk
7	7	22 June 1941	07:00	I-16	25 km (16 mi) northwest of Lemberg	9	9	25 June 1941	09:10	DB-3	southeast of Berestechko
– Stab II. Gruppe of Jagdgeschwader 3 –
10	10	1 July 1941	19:42 (Note: According to Mathews and Foreman claimed at 19:45.)	Pe-2	15 km (9.3 mi) west of Korets	48♠	—	28 September 1941	—	I-61 (MiG-3)	
11	11	2 July 1941	05:42	ZKB-19 (Note: According to Mathews and Foreman claimed as an Ilyushin DB-3.)		49	46	4 October 1941	10:20	Il-2	
12	12	2 July 1941	11:30	V-11 (Il-2)	15 km (9.3 mi) north of Klevan	50	47	5 October 1941	12:25	I-61 (MiG-3)	12 km (7.5 mi) northwest of Yukhnov
13	13	2 July 1941	11:43	V-11 (Il-2)	30 km (19 mi) north-northwest of Rivne	51	48	5 October 1941	12:26	I-61 (Note: According to Mathews and Foreman claimed as a Petlyakov Pe-2.)	15 km (9.3 mi) northwest of Yukhnov
14	14	13 July 1941	06:30	I-153		52	49	6 October 1941	10:15	Pe-2	vicinity of Oryol
15	15	16 July 1941	11:42	DB-3		53	50	6 October 1941	12:15	Pe-2	vicinity of Oryol
16	16	16 July 1941	11:44	SB-2		54	51	7 October 1941	09:40	Pe-2	
17	17	23 July 1941	16:35	R-5		55	52	7 October 1941	12:40	Pe-2	
18	—	25 July 1941	—	DB-3		56	—	7 October 1941	—	Il-2	
19	18	5 August 1941	17:46	I-153		57	53	10 October 1941	12:40	I-61 (MiG-3)	
20	19	5 August 1941	18:22	I-17 (Note: According to Mathews and Foreman claimed as a Mikoyan-Gurevich MiG-1.)		58	54	10 October 1941	12:43	I-61 (MiG-3)	20 km (12 mi) northeast of Gzhatsk
21	20	8 August 1941	13:17	DB-3		59	55	17 October 1941	09:04	I-61 (MiG-3)	
22	21	8 August 1941	13:32	DB-3		60	56	17 October 1941	09:15	I-16	
23	22	9 August 1941	10:55	DB-3		61	57	17 October 1941	16:05	I-61 (MiG-3)	
24	23	11 August 1941	18:45	Bomber		62♠	58	18 October 1941	07:18	I-61 (MiG-3)	
25	24	12 August 1941	07:20	I-17		63♠	59	18 October 1941	07:20	I-61 (MiG-3)	
26	25	12 August 1941	07:25	SB-3		64♠	60	18 October 1941	10:05	I-61 (MiG-3)	
27	26	20 August 1941	17:45	I-16		65♠	61	18 October 1941	10:07	I-61 (MiG-3)	
28	27	20 August 1941	17:47	DB-3		66♠	62	18 October 1941	10:19	I-61 (MiG-3)	
29♠	28	21 August 1941	09:10	I-26 (Yak-1)		67♠	63	18 October 1941	10:20	I-61 (MiG-3)	
30♠	29	21 August 1941	11:06	R-5		68♠	64	18 October 1941	10:29 (Note: According to Mathews and Foreman claimed at 10:22.)	I-61 (MiG-3)	
31♠	30	21 August 1941	11:09	R-5		69♠	65	18 October 1941	14:46	I-61 (MiG-3)	
32♠	31	21 August 1941	12:00	DB-3		70♠	66	18 October 1941	14:48	I-61 (MiG-3)	
33♠	32	21 August 1941	17:05	I-26 (Yak-1)		71♠	67	19 October 1941	08:55	I-61 (MiG-3)	
34	33	22 August 1941	06:10	I-17		72♠	68	19 October 1941	12:36	Pe-2	
35	34	24 August 1941	09:00	I-180 (Note: According to Mathews and Foreman claimed as a Yakovlev Yak-7.)		73♠	69	19 October 1941	12:37	Pe-2	15 km (9.3 mi) south of Ishun
36	35	31 August 1941	09:08	TB-3 (ANT-6)	vicinity of Kremenchuk	74♠	70	19 October 1941	12:42	Pe-2	
37	36	8 September 1941	15:43	I-26 (Note: According to Mathews and Foreman claimed as an Ilyushin Il-2.)		75♠	71	19 October 1941	15:35	I-61 (MiG-3)	
38	37	9 September 1941	16:50	Il-2 (Note: According to Mathews and Foreman claimed as a Polikarpov I-16.)		76	72	20 October 1941	11:07	I-61 (MiG-3)	
39	38	12 September 1941	15:52 (Note: According to Mathews and Foreman claimed at 14:52 as a Yakovlev Yak-1.)	Il-2		77♠	73	22 October 1941	06:55	I-16	
40	39	12 September 1941	17:15	I-26		78♠	74	22 October 1941	07:20	Pe-2	
41	40	13 September 1941	17:19	V-11 (Il-2)		79♠	75	22 October 1941	10:21	I-16	
42	41	14 September 1941	05:47	I-153	vicinity of Myronivka	80♠	76	22 October 1941	10:22	I-16	5 km (3.1 mi) west of Djemen
43	42	19 September 1941	13:55	R-5		81♠	77	22 October 1941	10:22	I-61	
44♠	43	28 September 1941	12:20	Pe-2		82	78	23 October 1941	10:55	I-61 (MiG-3)	
45♠	44	28 September 1941	12:21	Pe-2		83	79	23 October 1941	10:58	I-61 (MiG-3)	
46♠	45	28 September 1941	14:46	Pe-2		84	80	23 October 1941	11:40	I-61 (MiG-3)	
47♠	—	28 September 1941	—	I-61 (MiG-3)		85	81	24 October 1941	13:50	I-153	
– Stab of Jagdgeschwader 54 –
86	82	30 April 1942	—	I-16							
– Stab of Jagdgeschwader 77 –
87	83	16 May 1942	—	LaGG-3		119	115	14 August 1942	—	LaGG-3	
88	84	16 May 1942	—	LaGG-3		120	116	14 August 1942	—	LaGG-3	
89	85	16 May 1942	—	LaGG-3		121♠	117	16 August 1942	—	LaGG-3	
90	86	17 May 1942	—	R-5		122♠	118	16 August 1942	—	LaGG-3	
91	87	17 May 1942	—	R-5		123♠	119	16 August 1942	—	Il-2	
92	88	17 May 1942	—	R-5		124♠	120	16 August 1942	—	I-16	
93	89	17 May 1942	—	LaGG-3		125♠	121	16 August 1942	—	I-16	
94	90	18 May 1942	—	R-5		126	122	17 August 1942	—	LaGG-3	
95	91	18 May 1942	—	R-5		127	123	17 August 1942	—	LaGG-3	
96	92	18 May 1942	—	R-5		128	124	18 August 1942	—	I-16	
97	93	19 May 1942	—	R-5		129	125	18 August 1942	—	I-16	
98	94	19 May 1942	—	R-5		130	126	18 August 1942	—	I-16	
99	95	19 May 1942	—	R-5		131	127	19 August 1942	—	Il-2	
100	96	20 May 1942	—	Il-2		132	128	19 August 1942	—	Il-2	
101	97	20 May 1942	—	LaGG-3		133	129	19 August 1942	—	I-153	
102	98	7 June 1942	—	LaGG-3	vicinity of Sevastopol	134	130	20 August 1942	—	I-16	
103	99	9 June 1942	—	I-153	vicinity of Sevastopol	135	131	20 August 1942	—	I-153	
104	100	18 June 1942	—	Il-2	vicinity of Sevastopol	136	132	20 August 1942	—	I-153	
105	101	18 June 1942	—	LaGG-3	vicinity of Sevastopol	137	133	22 August 1942	—	Boston	
106	102	21 June 1942	—	LaGG-3		138	134	22 August 1942	—	Boston	
107	103	21 June 1942	—	LaGG-3		139	135	24 August 1942	—	LaGG-3	
108	104	26 July 1942	—	I-16		140	136	24 August 1942	—	LaGG-3	
109	105	27 July 1942	—	I-153		141	137	24 August 1942	—	LaGG-3	
110	106	27 July 1942	—	I-153		142	138	24 August 1942	—	Boston	
111	107	4 August 1942	—	Yak-1		143	139	25 August 1942	—	Boston	
112	108	6 August 1942	—	Il-2		144	140	26 August 1942	—	Pe-2	
113	109	6 August 1942	—	Yak-1		145	141	27 August 1942	—	I-16	
114	110	6 August 1942	—	Il-2		146	142	28 August 1942	—	Boston	
115	111	6 August 1942	—	R-5		147	143	29 August 1942	—	LaGG-3	
116	112	7 August 1942	—	Yak-1		148	144	29 August 1942	—	LaGG-3	
117	113	8 August 1942	—	Yak-1		149	145	29 August 1942	—	LaGG-3	
118	114	14 August 1942	—	Boston		150	146	29 August 1942	—	Pe-2	

=== Awards ===
- Iron Cross (1939)
  - 2nd Class (21 September 1939)
  - 1st Class (13 June 1940)
- Narvik Shield (30 January 1941)
- Front Flying Clasp of the Luftwaffe in Gold (11 May 1941)
- Honour Goblet of the Luftwaffe (21 July 1941)
- Combined Pilots-Observation Badge in Gold with Diamonds
- Knight's Cross of the Iron Cross with Oak Leaves, Swords and Diamonds
  - Knight's Cross on 18 September 1941 as Hauptmann and Gruppenkommandeur of II./Jagdgeschwader 3
  - 38th Oak Leaves on 26 October 1941 as Hauptmann and Gruppenkommandeur of II./Jagdgeschwader 3 (Note: According to German author Veit Scherzer on 25 October 1941.)
  - 13th Swords on 23 June 1942 as Hauptmann and Geschwaderkommodore of Jagdgeschwader 77
  - 3rd Diamonds on 30 August 1942 as Major and Geschwaderkommodore of Jagdgeschwader 77
- Crimea Shield (15 March 1943)

== Notes ==
Military offices
Preceded by Major Gotthard Handrick	Commander of Jagdgeschwader 77 Herz As; 16 May 1942 – 30 September 1942	Succeeded by Major Joachim Müncheberg
Preceded by Major Herbert Ihlefeld	Acting commander of Jagdgeschwader 52; 25 July 1942 – 31 August 1942	Succeeded by Major Herbert Ihlefeld
Preceded by Major Karl Hentschel	Commander of Jagdfliegerführer 3; 15 October 1942 – 6 September 1943	Succeeded by Jagdfliegerführer 5
Preceded by Jagdfliegerführer 3	Commander of Jagdfliegerführer 5; 6 September 1943 – May 1944	Succeeded by unknown
Preceded by Generalleutnant Adolf Galland	General der Jagdflieger; 31 January 1945 – 8 May 1945	Succeeded by none
