= Karl-Heinz Krahl =

German World War II flying ace (1914–1942)

- Krahl as a Hauptmann
- Born: 25 September 1914; Breslau
- Died: 14 April 1942 (aged 27) near Luqa, Malta
- Burial place: German war cemetery in Cagliari (reinterred)
- Military career
- Allegiance: Nazi Germany
- Branch: Army (1934); Luftwaffe (1934–1942)
- Service years: 1934–1942
- Rank: Hauptmann (captain)
- Units: Condor Legion; JG 2 JG 3
- Commands: I./JG 2 II./JG 3
- Conflicts: See battles Spanish Civil War World War II: Battle of France; Battle of Britain; Defense of the Reich; Siege of Malta †
- Awards: Knight's Cross of the Iron Cross

Karl-Heinz Krahl (25 September 1914 – 14 April 1942) was a Luftwaffe ace and recipient of the Knight's Cross of the Iron Cross during World War II. The Knight's Cross of the Iron Cross, and its variants were the highest awards in the military and paramilitary forces of Nazi Germany during World War II. Krahl was shot down 14 April 1942, by anti-aircraft fire from the defenses at RAF Luqa during the Siege of Malta. During his career he is credited with between 19 - 24 aerial victories, all against Western forces.

== Career ==
On 5 September 1940, Krahl succeeded Oberleutnant Helmut Wick as Staffelkapitän (squadron leader) of 3. Staffel of JG 2. Wick had been appointed Gruppenkommandeur (group commander) of I. Gruppe of JG 2. When Wick was appointed Geschwaderkommodore (wing commander) of JG 2 on 20 October, Krahl succeeded him as Gruppenkommandeur of I. Gruppe.

=== Mediterranean theater and death ===
Krahl was transferred and appointed Gruppenkommandeur of II. Gruppe of Jagdgeschwader 3 "Udet" (JG 3—3rd Fighter Wing) on 21 November 1941. He succeeded Hauptmann Gordon Gollob who was transferred. Command of I. Gruppe of JG 2 was passed to Hauptmann Ignaz Prestele. At the time, the Gruppe was based at Wiesbaden-Erbenheim Airfield and preparing for deployment to Mediterranean theater. In early January 1942, II. Gruppe received orders to relocate to Sicily where the II. Fliegerkorps (2nd Air Corps) concentrated forces during the Siege of Malta. On 18 January, the first elements of II. Gruppe arrived at Comiso Airfield.

On 14 April 1942, he was shot down and killed in action in his Messerschmitt Bf 109 F-4 (Werknummber 8784—factory number) by anti-aircraft artillery near Luqa, Malta. The next day, he was replaced by Major Kurt Brändle as commander of II. Gruppe. Following World War II, Krahl was reinterred at the German War Cemetery in Cagliari, the capital of the island of Sardinia.

== Summary of career ==
=== Aerial victory claims ===
According to Obermaier, Krahl was with 24 aerial victories. Mathews and Foreman, authors of Luftwaffe Aces — Biographies and Victory Claims, researched the German Federal Archives and found records for 19 aerial victory claims, all of which claimed on the Western Front.

Chronicle of aerial victories
Claim	Date	Time	Type	Location	Claim	Date	Time	Type	Location
– 1. Staffel of Jagdgeschwader 2 "Richthofen" – "Phoney War" — 1 September 1939 – 9 May 1940
1	21 April 1940	17:26	M.S.406	south of Saarbrücken					
– 1. Staffel of Jagdgeschwader 2 "Richthofen" – Battle of France — 10 May – 25 June 1940
2	19 May 1940	12:50	Hurricane	Cambrai	4	21 May 1940	19:12	M.S.406	Compiègne
3	20 May 1940	18:35	Blenheim	Péronne	5	26 May 1940	17:00	Spitfire	Calais
– 3. Staffel of Jagdgeschwader 2 "Richthofen" – At the Channel and over England — 26 June – 20 October 1940
6	30 August 1940	12:45	Hurricane		10	28 September 1940	15:44	Hurricane	Selsey Bill
7	31 August 1940	18:55	Hurricane		11	5 October 1940	14:50	Hurricane	south of Bournemouth
8	31 August 1940	19:30	Curtiss	Dover	12	15 October 1940	13:40	Hurricane	Portsmouth
9	5 September 1940	16:05	Spitfire						
– Stab I. Gruppe of Jagdgeschwader 2 "Richthofen" – At the Channel and over England — 20 October 1940 – 21 June 1941
13	29 October 1940	15:45	Hurricane		15	5 November 1940	14:35	Hurricane	northeast of Portland
14	5 November 1940	14:35	Hurricane	northeast of Portland					
– Stab I. Gruppe of Jagdgeschwader 2 "Richthofen" – On the Western Front — 22 June – 20 November 1941
16	24 July 1941	14:23	Spitfire	north of Brest	18	24 July 1941	15:25	Wellington	20 km (12 mi) north of Brignogan
17	24 July 1941	15:25	Wellington	20 km (12 mi) north of Brignogan					
– Staffel II. Gruppe of Jagdgeschwader 3 "Udet" – Mediterranean Theater — 7 January – 14 April 1942
19	10 March 1942	17:10	Hurricane						

=== Awards ===
- Spanish Cross in Gold with Swords (14 April 1939)
- Iron Cross (1939) 2nd and 1st Class
- Knight's Cross of the Iron Cross on 13 November 1940 as Hauptmann and Gruppenkommandeur of the I./Jagdgeschwader 2 "Richthofen"

Military offices
Preceded by Hauptmann Helmut Wick	Commander of I. Jagdgeschwader 2; 20 October 1940 – 20 November 1941	Succeeded by Hauptmann Ignaz Prestele
Preceded by Hauptmann Gordon Gollob	Commander of II. Jagdgeschwader 3; 21 November 1941 – 14 April 1942	Succeeded by Major Kurt Brändle
