= Jagdfliegerführer 3 =

Jagdfliegerführer 3 (Jafü 3) was formed December 21, 1939 in Wiesbaden. On September 6, 1943 redesignated Jagdfliegerführer 5, reformed again on December 27, 1943, but was disbanded in January 1944. The headquarters was located at Wiesbaden and from July 1940 in Deauville, from February 21, 1942 at Brest-Guipavas and from March 1942 again at Deauville.

== Commanding officers ==
=== Fliegerführer ===
- Generalmajor Dipl.Ing. Hans Klein, 21 December 1939 – 7 March 1940
- Oberst Gerd von Massow, 8 March 1940 – 5 June 1940
- Oberst Werner Junck, 5 June 1940 – 30 April 1941
- Generalmajor Max Ibel, 6 June 1941 – 31 December 1941
- Major Karl Hentschel, December 1941 – October 1942
- Major Gordon Gollob, 15 October 1942 – 6 September 1943
