= Kurt Brändle =

German World War II fighter pilot (1912–1943)

- Brändle as a Hauptmann
- Born: 19 January 1912; Ludwigsburg, Duchy of Baden, German Empire
- Died: 3 November 1943 (aged 31); North Sea, off Amsterdam, German-occupied Netherlands
- Cause of death: Killed in action
- Burial place: Ysselsteyn German war cemetery, Netherlands
- Military career
- Allegiance: Nazi Germany
- Branch: Luftwaffe
- Service years: 1935–1943
- Rank: Major (major)
- Units: JG 134, JG 53, JG 3
- Commands: 5./JG 3, II./JG 3
- Conflicts: See battles World War II: Battle of France; Battle of Britain; Siege of Malta; Eastern Front; Operation Barbarossa; Battle of Kursk; Defense of the Reich †
- Awards: Knight's Cross of the Iron Cross with Oak Leaves

Kurt-Werner Brändle (19 January 1912 – 3 November 1943) was a German Luftwaffe military aviator during World War II, a fighter ace credited with 180 enemy aircraft shot down in over 700 combat missions. The majority of his victories were claimed over the Eastern Front, with 25 claims over the Western Front. (Note: According to Spick, Brändle is credited with 180 aerial victories, 160 of which claimed over the Eastern Front and 20 in the western theater of operations, including 14 during the Battle of Britain. According to Obermaier, he is also credited with 180 aerial victories, stating that 25 of which were claimed over the Western Front. Authors Prien and Stemmer only credit him with 172 aerial victories.) He was "ace-in-a-day" three times, shooting down five or more aircraft on a single day.

Born in Ludwigsburg, Brändle, who already was a civilian motor-powered aircraft and glider pilot, volunteered for military service in the Luftwaffe of Nazi Germany in 1935. He was posted to Jagdgeschwader 53 (JG 53—53rd Fighter Wing) in 1939 and claimed 14 aerial victories on the Western Front. In May 1942 he was given command of II. Gruppe (2nd group) of Jagdgeschwader 3 "Udet" (JG 3—3rd Fighter Wing). Fighting on the Eastern Front, he was awarded the Knight's Cross of the Iron Cross on 1 July 1942 after 49 aerial victories. In July and August 1942, he claimed a further 50 aerial victories in the southern sector of the Eastern Front. After claiming his 100th aerial victory he was awarded the Knight's Cross of the Iron Cross with Oak Leaves on 27 August 1942.

On 5 July 1943 during the Battle of Kursk, Brändle achieved his 150th aerial victory and in August 1943 was transferred to the Western Front fighting in Defense of the Reich. There Brändle was killed in action on 3 November 1943 west of Amsterdam in the Netherlands. His body was washed ashore near Zandvoort on 30 December 1943.

== Early life and career ==
Brändle was born on 19 January 1912 in Ludwigsburg in the Kingdom of Württemberg, a federated state of the German Empire. His father was a Meister, a master craftsman, in the field of precision mechanics. Following school, Brändle learned the trade of a surgical instrument maker and worked in his father's firm.

Since his early youth he was very enthusiastic about flying and volunteered for military service in the Luftwaffe of the Third Reich on 10 December 1935. There he participated in a number of exercises and was promoted to Leutnant (second lieutenant) of the Reserves on 1 December 1936. In his civilian life, Brändle attained a pilot license and worked as a flight instructor. As an instructor, he trained roughly 150 students and logged more than 6,000 starts and 8,000 flight hours before he became a military aviator. In addition to his passion for motor power flight, he was also a glider pilot.

In early 1937 Brändle passed his Meister examination in aircraft construction and in the same year was trained as a fighter pilot with Jagdgeschwader 134 "Horst Wessel" (JG 134—134th Fighter Wing), named after the martyr of the Nazi movement Horst Wessel. (Note: For an explanation of Luftwaffe unit designations, see Organization of the Luftwaffe during World War II.) As of 1 February 1939, Brändle served with Flieger-Ausbildungs-Regiment 22 (22nd Flight Training Regiment) in Güstrow. There, he transferred from the reserve force to active service and was promoted to Oberleutnant (first lieutenant) on 1 June 1939. He was then transferred to the 4. Staffel (4th Squadron) of Jagdgeschwader 53 (JG 53—53rd Fighter Wing).

== World War II ==
World War II in Europe began on Friday 1 September 1939 when German forces invaded Poland. Brändle received the Iron Cross 2nd Class (Eisernes Kreuz 2. Klasse) on 20 April 1940. (Note: According to Prien, the presentation of the Iron Cross 2nd Class was made on 1 April 1940.) He claimed his first aerial victory on 10 May 1940 during the Battle of France, shooting down an Armée de l'Air (French Air Force) Morane-Saulnier M.S.406 south of Sedan. On 13 May, Brändle may have shot down Czech pilot Lieutenant Adolf Vrana from Groupe de Chasse I/5 who was shot down near Harricourt. In total, Brändle claimed two victories over France before he was wounded on 26 May 1940. During takeoff on a maintenance test flight he crashed into a Dornier Do 17 injuring himself in the head. He spent the next few weeks in the military hospital at Heidelberg.

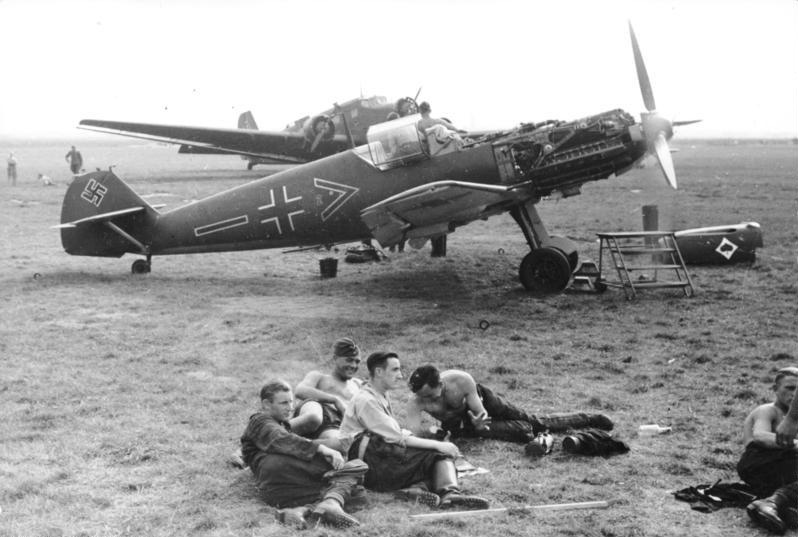
A Messerschmitt Bf 109 E-1's of JG 53, similar to those flown by Brändle

After recovering from the hospital, Brändle claimed his second victory during the Battle of Britain over the Royal Air Force (RAF) on 11 August 1940. On 26 August 1940, he was tasked with the leadership of 5. Staffel (5th Squadron) of JG 53. Following his fourth aerial victory, he was awarded the Iron Cross 1st Class (Eisernes Kreuz 1. Klasse) on 3 September 1940. He was officially appointed Staffelkapitän (squadron leader) of 5. Staffel on 15 September 1940. On 11 November 1940, he claimed his 6th and 7th aerial victories and was awarded the Front Flying Clasp of the Luftwaffe for Fighter Pilots (Frontflugspange für Jagdflieger) in Silver on 5 May 1941 and in Gold on 7 June 1941.

The bulk of the Geschwader's air elements were moved via Jever, in northern Germany, to Mannheim-Sandhofen on 8 June 1941. There the aircraft were given a maintenance overhaul prior to moving east. The II. Gruppe was transferred to Neusiedel in East Prussia, present-day Malomožaiskojė in Kaliningrad Oblast in Russia, between 12–14 June. On 22 June the Geschwader crossed into Soviet airspace in support of Operation Barbarossa, the invasion of the Soviet Union which opened the Eastern Front. There, Brändle claimed further victories and by the end of October 1941 was credited with 28 aerial victories.

Brändle's unit was then relocated to the Western Front again in October 1941 where it was based at Leeuwarden in the Netherlands before it was moved to the Mediterranean theater in December 1941. Based at Comiso airfield, Brändle flew combat missions against the RAF during the siege of Malta. There he was awarded the German Cross in Gold (Deutsches Kreuz in Gold) on 25 February 1942 and four days later, on 1 March, he was promoted to Hauptmann (captain).

=== Group commander ===
On 1 May 1942, Brändle was appointed Gruppenkommandeur (group commander) of II. Gruppe of Jagdgeschwader 3 "Udet" (JG 3—3rd Fighter Wing), named after the World War I fighter ace Ernst Udet. Its former Gruppenkommandeur, Hauptmann Karl-Heinz Krahl, had been killed in action over Malta on 14 April 1942. At the time, the Gruppe was stationed at Plzeň for rest and refit before it was relocated to the Eastern Front on 18 May 1942. Too late to participate in the Battle of the Kerch Peninsula, it was located on the left wing of Army Group South, assigned to an airfield at Chuguyev in the Kharkov area where they arrived on 19 May. Brändle scored the Gruppe's first victory after the relocation, claiming a Polikarpov R-5 reconnaissance bomber aircraft at 3:49 am on 20 May 1942. By this date, Brändle had accumulated 36 victories. He was awarded the Knight's Cross of the Iron Cross (Ritterkreuz des Eisernen Kreuzes) on 1 July 1942 for 49 aerial victories. On this day, he claimed his 53rd aerial victory, after he shot down an Ilyushin Il-2 "Sturmovik".

Brändle often claimed multiple victories per day, three victories on 8 July 1942 took his tally to 58 and further three claims made on 10 July took his score to 61. On 16 July 1942 he filed four claims, numbers 64–67. He became an "ace-in-a-day" for the first time on 26 July 1942 when he shot down five enemy aircraft, aerial victories 73–77, and again five on 7 August 1942, 89 in total.

In July and August 1942, he claimed 50 aerial victories in the southern sector of the Eastern Front, among them his 100th to 102nd victory on 23 August 1942. He was the 17th Luftwaffe pilot to achieve the century mark. For this achievement he was awarded the Knight's Cross of the Iron Cross with Oak Leaves (Ritterkreuz des Eisernen Kreuzes mit Eichenlaub) on 27 August 1942, the 114th officer or soldier of the Wehrmacht so honored. The presentation was made by Adolf Hitler personally.

Brändle was promoted to Major on 1 March 1943. On 29 April 1943, he claimed his 135th to 138th aerial victories. On 5 July 1943, the first day of the Battle of Kursk (Unternehmen Zitadelle), he claimed five victories taking his total to 151. His II. Gruppe claimed 77 aircraft shot down on 12 July which included its 2,000 aerial victory of the war.

=== Defense of the Reich and death ===
In early August 1943, Brändle's II. Gruppe was withdrawn from the Eastern Front for service in Defense of the Reich on the Western Front. The Gruppe spent one-month training in northern Germany before they arrived at the Schiphol airfield near Amsterdam in the Netherlands on 12 September. While based at Uetersen Airfield, the Gruppe received the Messerschmitt Bf 109 G-6 which was equipped with Y-Control for fighters, a system used to control groups of fighters intercepting United States Army Air Forces (USAAF) bomber formations.

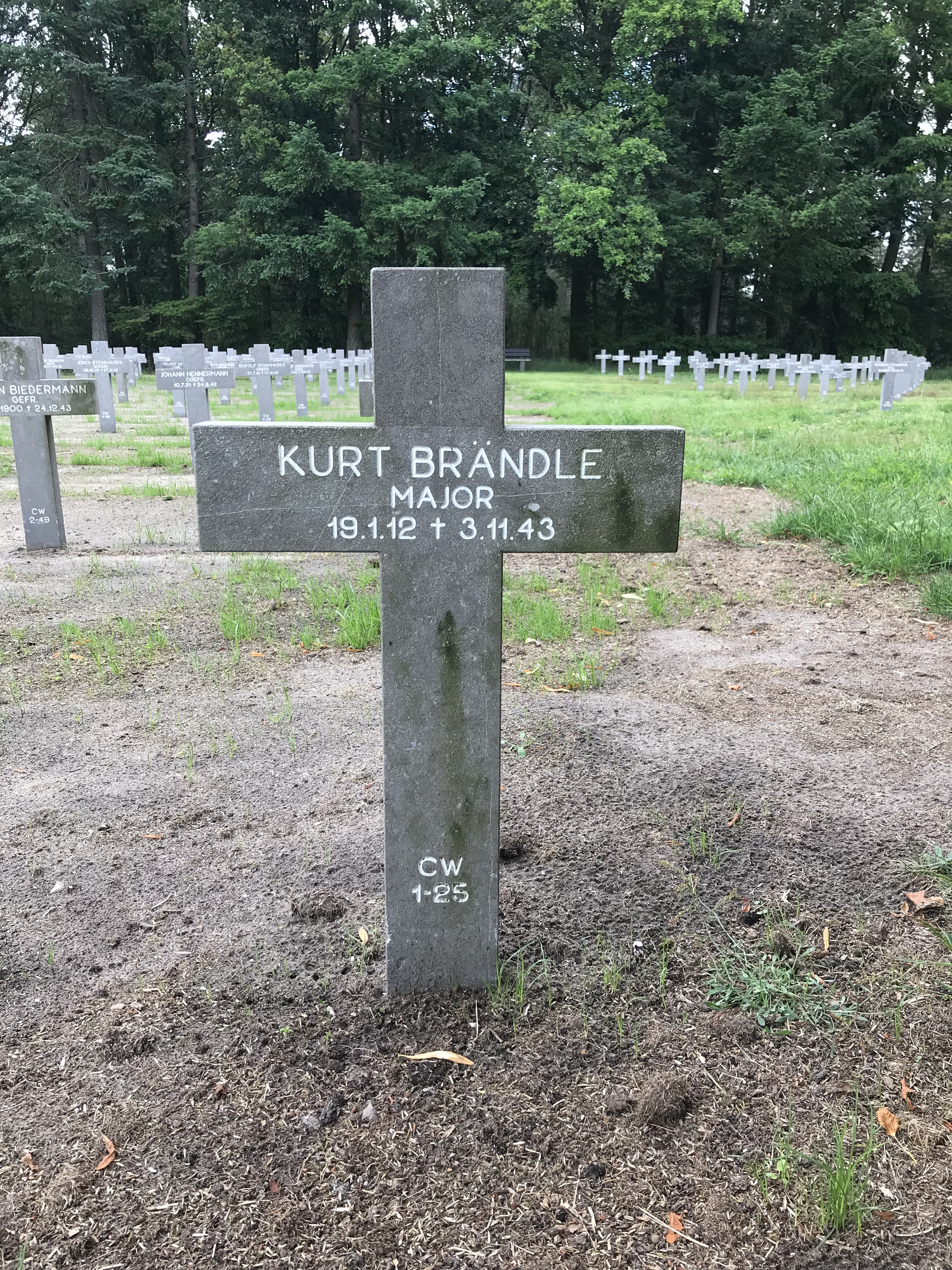
German War Cemetery Ysselsteyn – Kurt Brändle

On 3 November 1943, Brändle shot down two Republic P-47 Thunderbolts fighters escorting a formation of Boeing B-17 Flying Fortresses on a mission targeting Wilhelmshaven. Later that day, he was killed in action west of Amsterdam in the Netherlands. Following an attack by a group of Martin B-26 Marauders on Schiphol airfield, II. Gruppe scrambled to counter the attack. It is assumed that he was shot down in his Bf 109 G-6 (Werknummer 26058—factory number) by Royal Canadian Air Force (RCAF) fighters under the command of Wing Commander Lloyd Chadburn. His body was later washed ashore near Zandvoort on 30 December 1943 and was buried at the Heroes Cemetery in Amsterdam (field 74, grave 405) one day later. His remains were moved in January 1944 before they were reinterred for a last time on 2 December 1947, this time at the cemetery Ysselsteyn (block CW, row 1, grave 25).

== Summary of career ==
=== Aerial victory claims ===
According to US historian David T. Zabecki, Brändle was credited with 180 aerial victories. Spick also lists Trenkel with 180 aerial victories claimed in approximately 700 combat missions, 160 on the Eastern Front and 20 on the Western Front, and a mission-to-claim ratio of 3.89. Mathews and Foreman, authors of Luftwaffe Aces — Biographies and Victory Claims, researched the German Federal Archives and found records for 170 aerial victory claims, plus five further unconfirmed claims. This number includes 16 aerial victory claims on the Western Front, and 154 Soviet Air Forces piloted aircraft on the Eastern Front.

Victory claims were logged to a map-reference (PQ = Planquadrat), for example "PQ 18274". The Luftwaffe grid map (Jägermeldenetz) covered all of Europe, western Russia and North Africa and was composed of rectangles measuring 15 minutes of latitude by 30 minutes of longitude, an area of about 360 square miles (930 km^{2}). These sectors were then subdivided into 36 smaller units to give a location area 3 km × 4 km (1.9 mi × 2.5 mi) in size.

Chronicle of aerial victories
This and the ♠ (Ace of spades) indicates those aerial victories which made Brändle an "ace-in-a-day", a term which designates a fighter pilot who has shot down five or more airplanes in a single day. This and the ! (exclamation mark) indicates those aerial victories listed by Prien, Stemmer, Rodeike and Bock. This and the # (hash mark) indicates those aerial victories listed by Mathews and Foreman. This and the ? (question mark) indicates information discrepancies listed by Prien, Stemmer, Rodeike, Bock, Mathews and Foreman.
Claim!	Claim#	Date	Time	Type	Location	Claim!	Claim#	Date	Time	Type	Location
– 4. Staffel of Jagdgeschwader 53 – Battle of France — 10 May – 25 June 1940
1	1	13 May 1940	12:05	M.S.406	south of Sedan	3	3	16 August 1940	18:15	Spitfire	west-southwest of Isle of Wight
2	2? (Note: According to Mathews and Foreman claimed with 6. Staffel of Jagdgeschwader 53.)	11 August 1940	11:45	Spitfire	west of Portland	4	4	11 September 1940	17:40	Spitfire	
– 5. Staffel of Jagdgeschwader 53 – At the Channel and over England — 26 June 1940 – 21 June 1941
5	5	26 September 1940	17:38	Spitfire	10 km (6.2 mi) west of Isle of Wight	7	7	11 November 1940	13:15	Spitfire	
6	6	11 November 1940	13:07	Spitfire							
– 5. Staffel of Jagdgeschwader 53 – Operation Barbarossa — 22 June – 8 October 1941
8	8	22 June 1941	18:03	SB-3	north of Tauroggen	19	18	26 July 1941	11:26	SB-3	
9	9	1 July 1941	19:50	SB-3		20	19	30 August 1941	18:07	R-5	
10	10	6 July 1941	19:46	SB-3		21	20	11 September 1941	14:22	I-16	
11	11	6 July 1941	19:51	SB-3		22	21	16 September 1941	06:47	I-16	
12		7 July 1941	03:57	I-153		23	22	17 September 1941	11:38	I-18 (MiG-1)	
13	12	9 July 1941	05:01	Li-6		24	23	21 September 1941	10:38	I-18 (MiG-1)	
14	13	12 July 1941	19:51	SB-3		25	24	22 September 1941	15:51	I-18 (MiG-1)	
15	14	15 July 1941	19:14	DB-3		26	25	22 September 1941	15:53	I-18 (MiG-1)	
16	15	24 July 1941	18:26	I-153		27	26	27 September 1941	16:39	I-18 (MiG-1)	
17	16	25 July 1941	20:21	Pe-2		28	27	3 October 1941	10:00	I-18 (MiG-1)	
18	17	26 July 1941	11:23	SB-2		29	28	4 October 1941	12:09	Pe-2	
– 5. Staffel of Jagdgeschwader 53 – Mediterranean Theater — 15 December 1941 – 31 December 1942
30	29	24 December 1941	13:08	Hurricane		34	33	24 March 1942	15:08	Spitfire	
31	30	4 January 1942	10:28	Hurricane		35	34	21 April 1942	12:37	Spitfire	
32	31	19 January 1942	13:54	Hurricane		36	35	21 April 1942	17:39	Spitfire	1 km (0.62 mi) south of Bubaqra
33	32	15 February 1942	10:14	Hurricane							
– Stab II. Gruppe of Jagdgeschwader 3 – Eastern Front — 29 April 1942 – 31 December 1943
37	36	20 May 1942	03:49	R-5		104	103	15 September 1942	09:44	Il-2	6 km (3.7 mi) north of Zubtsov
38	37	23 May 1942	07:26	I-61 (MiG-3)		105	104	21 September 1942	11:06	Pe-2	10 km (6.2 mi) north of Rzhev
39	38	23 May 1942	12:17	I-61 (MiG-3)		106	105	21 September 1942	11:07	MiG-1	15 km (9.3 mi) northeast of Rzhev
40	39	26 May 1942	08:57	MiG-1		107	106	29 September 1942	08:59	LaGG-3	PQ 18274, southeast of Staraya Russa
41	40	26 May 1942	17:10	MiG-1	east of Savyntsi	108	107	29 September 1942	09:08	I-16	PQ 18252, east-southeast of Staraya Russa
42	41	26 May 1942	17:20	MiG-1	7 km (4.3 mi) south of Savyntsi	109	108	7 November 1942	12:29	LaGG-3	PQ 17862
43	42	29 May 1942	15:49	Pe-2		110	109	10 November 1942	12:27	LaGG-3	24 km (15 mi) southwest of Zapadnaya
44	43	2 June 1942	13:14	MiG-1		111	110	11 November 1942	14:17	La-5	PQ 27731
45	44	2 June 1942	13:23	MiG-1		112	111	17 December 1942	10:55	Il-2? (Note: According to Mathews and Foreman claimed as a Yakovlev Yak-4.)	PQ 29452
46	45	10 June 1942	17:32	LaGG-3	3 km (1.9 mi) north of Buganjewka	113	112	17 December 1942	13:10	Yak-1	8 km (5.0 mi) north of Abganerowo
47	46	11 June 1942	06:35	Il-2		114	113	17 December 1942	13:17	Il-2	6 km (3.7 mi) southwest of Petrapawlowskoje; 10 km (6.2 mi) south of Shutow
48	47	11 June 1942	06:42	Il-2		115	114	17 December 1942	13:23	Il-2	PQ 39670; 20 km (12 mi) northwest of Shutow
49	48	12 June 1942	10:54	Su-2 (Seversky)		116	115	17 December 1942	13:30	Il-2	3 km (1.9 mi) southeast of Nestarkin
50	49	13 June 1942	10:18	Il-2		117	116	27 December 1942	11:55	MiG-1	PQ 29394
51	50	24 June 1942	11:38	LaGG-3	south of Wilschana	118	117	27 December 1942	12:05	Il-2	3 km (1.9 mi) southeast of Nestarkin; 10 km (6.2 mi) west of Obliwskaja
52	51	29 June 1942	18:42	Pe-2		119	118	31 December 1942	07:06	Il-2	3 km (1.9 mi) south of Michailowka
53	52	30 June 1942	11:38	LaGG-3		120	119	31 December 1942	07:30	Il-2	PQ 19431
54	53	1 July 1942	16:17	Il-2	3 km (1.9 mi) southeast of Alissowo; Gorscheschnoje	121	120	3 January 1943	07:52	Il-2	PQ 09391
55	54	3 July 1942	15:10	Il-2		122	121	26 January 1943	11:47	MiG-1? (Note: According to Mathews and Foreman claimed as a Lavochkin-Gorbunov-Gudkov LaGG-3.)	PQ 09562
56	55	4 July 1942	16:58	LaGG-3		123	122	28 January 1943	09:25	Yak-4	PQ 09713
57	56	8 July 1942	19:24	Pe-2		124	123	1 February 1943	11:05	MiG-1	PQ 99461; 40 km (25 mi) east-northeast of Voroshilovgrad
58	57	8 July 1942	19:27	Pe-2		125	124	1 February 1943	11:15	Yak-1	PQ 09513, west of Klimovo
59	58	8 July 1942	19:32	Pe-2		126	125	1 February 1943	11:22	Yak-4	PQ 99861; 40 km (25 mi) east of Ravenki
60	59	10 July 1942	09:30	Pe-2		127	126	2 February 1943	09:21	Il-2	PQ 99614; 20 km (12 mi) southeast of Voroshilovgrad
61	60	10 July 1942	09:50	MiG-1		128	127	2 February 1943	09:23	Il-2	PQ 99623; 35 km (22 mi) southeast of Voroshilovgrad
62	61	10 July 1942	09:52	MiG-1		129	128	2 February 1943	09:25	Il-2	PQ 99642; 25 km (16 mi) southeast of Voroshilovgrad
63	62	11 July 1942	08:55	R-5		130	129	10 February 1943	09:10	La-5	PQ 34 Ost 99452, east of Voroshilovgrad; 25 km (16 mi) east-northeast of Voroshilovgrad
64	63	13 July 1942	09:07	MiG-3		131	130	20 April 1943	11:56	LaGG-3	PQ 34 Ost 75423, Novorossiysk; Kabardinka area
65	64	16 July 1942	11:45	LaGG-3		132	131	20 April 1943	11:58	Il-2	PQ 34 Ost 75464, southeast of Novorossiysk; Kabardinka area
66	65	16 July 1942	17:17	Pe-2		133		22 April 1943	17:30	P-39	
67	66	16 July 1942	17:20	Pe-2		134	132	23 April 1943	09:45	LaGG-3	PQ 34 Ost 85328, east of Novorossiysk; Krassnyj area
68	67	16 July 1942	17:23	Pe-2		135	133	23 April 1943	17:12	LaGG-3	PQ 34 Ost 75433, south of Novorossiysk; 10 km (6.2 mi) north of Kabardinka
69	68	20 July 1942	15:44	Il-2		136	134	29 April 1943	07:47	Yak-4	PQ 34 Ost 85154, 3 km (1.9 mi) southwest of Abinskaja; Abinskaja-Achtyrskaja
70	69	21 July 1942	09:05	Il-2	Konstantinowskoje	137	135	29 April 1943	07:56	Yak-4	PQ 34 Ost 85181, southwest of Achtyrskaja south of Achtyrskaja
71	70	23 July 1942	13:01	Il-2		138	136	29 April 1943	07:57	Yak-4	PQ 34 Ost 85181, southwest of Achtyrskaja south of Achtyrskaja
72	71	23 July 1942	13:03	Il-2		139	137	7 May 1943	16:26	I-16	PQ 34 Ost 86774, south of Troizkaja; Kijewskoje
73	72	24 July 1942	11:41	Yak-1		140	138	8 May 1943	11:31	I-153	PQ 34 Ost 75262, south of Krymskaja; Krymsk area
74♠	73	26 July 1942	12:04	Il-2	5 km (3.1 mi) north of Kalach	141	139	8 May 1943	11:33	I-153	PQ 34 Ost 85114, west of Mertschanskaja; Mertschskaja area
75♠	74	26 July 1942	12:09	MiG-1	2 km (1.2 mi) northwest of Kalach	142	140	8 May 1943	15:23	LaGG-3	PQ 34 Ost 85123, southwest of Mingrelskaja; Sswobodnyj area
76♠	75	26 July 1942	16:05	Pe-2		143	141	11 May 1943	11:56	LaGG-3	PQ 34 Ost 85144, southeast of Krymskaja west of Abinsk
77♠	76	26 July 1942	16:07	Pe-2		144	142	31 May 1943	06:02	La-5	PQ 35 Ost 71794, south of Bolshoj Burluk; 25 km (16 mi) south of Novy Oskol
78♠	77	26 July 1942	16:11	Yak-1		145	143	19 June 1943	08:55	La-5	PQ 35 Ost 62813, west of Prilepy; 20 km (12 mi) east of Oboyan
79	78	27 July 1942	09:11	LaGG-3	Kalach	146	144	20 June 1943	09:57	Boston	PQ 35 Ost 70161, near train station Shipowatoje; 20 km (12 mi) northwest of Valuyki
80	79	27 July 1942	09:12	LaGG-3	Kalach	147♠	145	5 July 1943	03:50	Il-2	PQ 35 Ost 60122, north of Kharkov-Roganj; Kharkov area
81	80	3 August 1942	14:55	Yak-1	south of Peskowatka	148♠	146	5 July 1943	03:57	Il-2	PQ 35 Ost 60284, Malinovka; 5 km (3.1 mi) south of Malinovka
82	81	5 August 1942	07:12	Yak-1	northwest of Dubowy Ostrog	149♠	147	5 July 1943	04:07	Yak-1	PQ 35 Ost 6046, west of Petschenegi; 20 km (12 mi) east-southeast of Malinovka
83	82	6 August 1942	11:25	Pe-2? (Note: According to Mathews and Foreman claimed as a Yermolayev Yer-2.)	northeast of Aksay	150♠	148	5 July 1943	10:22	Il-2	PQ 35 Ost 61172, northwest of Belgorod; 15 km (9.3 mi) northeast of Kharkov
84	83	6 August 1942	11:26	Pe-2?	southeast of Iwanowka	151♠	149	5 July 1943	10:24	Il-2	PQ 35 Ost 61244, 2 km (1.2 mi) south of Lutschky; 10 km (6.2 mi) south of Prokhorovka
85	84	6 August 1942	11:35	Pe-2?	east of Tschapurniki	152	150	6 July 1943	14:04	Il-2	PQ 35 Ost 61112, west of Werchopenje; 15 km (9.3 mi) south of Belgorod
86♠	85	7 August 1942	14:09	Pe-2?	southwest of Klischewskij	153	151	6 July 1943	14:07	Il-2	PQ 35 Ost 61112, west of Werchopenje; 15 km (9.3 mi) south of Belgorod
87♠	86	7 August 1942	14:10	Pe-2?	south of Klischewskij	154	152	7 July 1943	07:33	La-5	PQ 35 Ost 61462, east of Belgorod; 25 km (16 mi) east-northeast of Belgorod
88♠	87	7 August 1942	14:11	Pe-2?	Klischewskij	155	153	7 July 1943	07:55	La-5	PQ 35 Ost 61211, east of Werchopenje; Prokhorovka area
89♠	88	7 August 1942	17:46	Pe-2?	west-northwest of Flodowitoje	156	154	7 July 1943	08:03	Il-2	PQ 35 Ost 61162, southeast of Werchopenje; 15 km (9.3 mi) southwest of Prokhorovka
90♠	89	7 August 1942	17:46	Pe-2?	south of Ssolenyi	157	155	14 July 1943	08:35	La-5	PQ 35 Ost 61253, Oskotchnoje; 15 km (9.3 mi) southeast of Prokhorovka
91	90	8 August 1942	09:46	Su-2 (Seversky)	east of Nischnij Mity	158	156	14 July 1943	08:41	La-5	PQ 35 Ost 61281, northeast of Belgorod; 20 km (12 mi) southeast of Prokhorovka
92	91	8 August 1942	09:48	Su-2 (Seversky)	west of Popow	159	157	17 July 1943	08:13	Yak-4	PQ 35 Ost 61131, Werchopenje; 10 km (6.2 mi) west of Prokhorovka
93	92	8 August 1942	09:50	Su-2 (Seversky)	southwest of Leonowo	160	158	17 July 1943	14:16	Boston	PQ 35 Ost 61164, Jakowlewo
94	93	9 August 1942	14:40	R-5	east of Mostrowskij	161	159	21 July 1943	10:12	Yak-1	PQ 34 Ost 88144, west of Kuteinykove; 20 km (12 mi) east of Jalisawehino
95	94	10 August 1942	07:07	I-180 (Yak-7)	southwest of Businowka southwest of Kalach	162	160	21 July 1943	10:14	La-5	PQ 34 Ost 88263, northeast of Kuybyshev; Jalisawehino area
96	95	11 August 1942	12:06	MiG-1	southwest of Stalingrad	163	161	22 July 1943	04:26	Il-2	PQ 34 Ost 88212, south of Krasny Luzk; 20 km (12 mi) southwest of Jalisawehino
97	96	19 August 1942	11:28	ER-2	southwest of Penyschino	164	162	22 July 1943	10:44	Il-2	PQ 34 Ost 88291, west of Marijewka; 15 km (9.3 mi) southeast of Jalisawehino
98	97	19 August 1942	11:31	ER-2	northwest of Alayew	165	163	22 July 1943	10:47	Il-2	PQ 34 Ost 88174, west of Kuteinykove; 20 km (12 mi) east-southeast of Jalisawehino
99	98	22 August 1942	09:45	LaGG-3	Satow	166	164	22 July 1943	10:50	Il-2	PQ 34 Ost 88181, 45 km (28 mi) east of Kuybyshev west of Domizza
100	99	22 August 1942	09:47	Il-2	northeast of Gratschij	167	165	23 July 1943	09:33	Il-2	PQ 34 Ost 88194, south of Kuteinykove; 5 km (3.1 mi) south of Kuteinykove
101	100	23 August 1942	05:43	ER-2	southwest of Karpovka	168	166	23 July 1943	09:35	Il-2	PQ 34 Ost 88182, west of Kuteinykove vicinity of Kuteinykove
102	101	23 August 1942	08:42	LaGG-3	northwest of Stalingrad	169	167	27 July 1943	18:15	La-5	PQ 35 Ost 61184, southeast of Sawidowka
103	102	23 August 1942	08:44	LaGG-3	Kotluban	170	168	30 July 1943	12:22	Il-2	PQ 34 Ost 88233, east of Dimitrijewka; 20 km (12 mi) northeast of Jalisawehino
– Stab II. Gruppe of Jagdgeschwader 3 – Western Front — 1 September – 31 December 1943
171	169	3 November 1943	12:30	P-47	PQ 05 Ost S/EK-4 northwest of Schagen	172	170	3 November 1943	12:31	P-47	PQ 05 Ost S/FK-4; 1 km (0.62 mi) west of Egmond

=== Awards ===
- Iron Cross (1939)
  - 2nd Class (20 April 1940)
  - 1st Class (3 September 1940)
- Front Flying Clasp of the Luftwaffe for Fighter Pilots
  - in Silver (5 May 1941)
  - in Gold (7 June 1941)
- German Cross in Gold on 25 February 1942 as Oberleutnant in the 5./Jagdgeschwader 53
- Knight's Cross of the Iron Cross with Oak Leaves
  - Knight's Cross on 1 July 1942 as Hauptmann and Gruppenkommandeur of the II./Jagdgeschwader 3 "Udet"
  - 114th Oak Leaves on 27 August 1942 as Hauptmann and Gruppenkommandeur of the II./Jagdgeschwader 3 "Udet"
