= Jagdfliegerführer 5 =

Jagdfliegerführer 5 (Jafü 5) was formed September 6, 1943 in Bernay from Jagdfliegerführer 3, subordinated to 5. Jagd-Division. The headquarters was located at Bernay (fr). The unit was disbanded on July 1, 1944.

== Commanding officers ==
=== Fliegerführer ===
- Oberst Gordon Gollob, September 1943 - May 1944
- unknown
