= List of Knight's Cross of the Iron Cross recipients (Schu–Sz) =

The Knight's Cross of the Iron Cross (German: Ritterkreuz des Eisernen Kreuzes) and its variants were the highest awards in the military and paramilitary forces of Nazi Germany during World War II. The Knight's Cross of the Iron Cross was awarded for a wide range of reasons and across all ranks, from a senior commander for skilled leadership of his troops in battle to a low-ranking soldier for a single act of extreme gallantry. A total of 7,321 awards were made between its first presentation on 30 September 1939 and its last bestowal on 17 June 1945. (Note: Großadmiral and President of Germany Karl Dönitz, Hitler's successor as Head of State (Staatsoberhaupt) and Supreme Commander of the Armed Forces, had ordered the cessation of all promotions and awards as of 11 May 1945 (Dönitz-decree). Consequently the last Knight's Cross awarded to Oberleutnant zur See of the Reserves Georg-Wolfgang Feller on 17 June 1945 must therefore be considered a de facto but not de jure hand-out.) This number is based on the analysis and acceptance of the order commission of the Association of Knight's Cross Recipients (AKCR). Presentations were made to members of the three military branches of the Wehrmacht—the Heer (Army), Kriegsmarine (Navy) and Luftwaffe (Air Force)—as well as the Waffen-SS, the Reichsarbeitsdienst (RAD—Reich Labour Service) and the Volkssturm (German national militia). There were also 43 recipients in the military forces of allies of the Third Reich.

These recipients are listed in the 1986 edition of Walther-Peer Fellgiebel's book, Die Träger des Ritterkreuzes des Eisernen Kreuzes 1939–1945 [The Bearers of the Knight's Cross of the Iron Cross 1939–1945]. Fellgiebel was the former chairman and head of the order commission of the AKCR. In 1996, the second edition of this book was published with an addendum delisting 11 of these original recipients. Author Veit Scherzer has cast doubt on a further 193 of these listings. The majority of the disputed recipients had been nominated for the award in 1945, when the deteriorating situation of Germany during the final days of World War II left a number of nominations incomplete and pending in various stages of the approval process.

Listed here are the 603 recipients whose last name is in the range "Schu–Sz". Scherzer has challenged the validity of 14 of these listings. This is the second of two lists of all 1,060 Knight's Cross of the Iron Cross recipients whose last names start with "S". The remaining recipients whose last name starts with "Sa–Schr" are listed at List of Knight's Cross of the Iron Cross recipients (Sa–Schr). The recipients are ordered alphabetically by last name. The rank listed is the recipient's rank at the time the Knight's Cross was awarded.

== Background ==
The Knight's Cross of the Iron Cross and its higher grades were based on four separate enactments. The first enactment, Reichsgesetzblatt I S. 1573 of 1 September 1939 instituted the Iron Cross (Eisernes Kreuz), the Knight's Cross of the Iron Cross and the Grand Cross of the Iron Cross (Großkreuz des Eisernen Kreuzes). Article 2 of the enactment mandated that the award of a higher class be preceded by the award of all preceding classes. As the war progressed, some of the recipients of the Knight's Cross distinguished themselves further and a higher grade, the Knight's Cross of the Iron Cross with Oak Leaves (Ritterkreuz des Eisernen Kreuzes mit Eichenlaub), was instituted. The Oak Leaves, as they were commonly referred to, were based on the enactment Reichsgesetzblatt I S. 849 of 3 June 1940. In 1941, two higher grades of the Knight's Cross were instituted. The enactment Reichsgesetzblatt I S. 613 of 28 September 1941 introduced the Knight's Cross of the Iron Cross with Oak Leaves and Swords (Ritterkreuz des Eisernen Kreuzes mit Eichenlaub und Schwertern) and the Knight's Cross of the Iron Cross with Oak Leaves, Swords and Diamonds (Ritterkreuz des Eisernen Kreuzes mit Eichenlaub, Schwertern und Brillanten). At the end of 1944 the final grade, the Knight's Cross of the Iron Cross with Golden Oak Leaves, Swords, and Diamonds (Ritterkreuz des Eisernen Kreuzes mit goldenem Eichenlaub, Schwertern und Brillanten), based on the enactment Reichsgesetzblatt 1945 I S. 11 of 29 December 1944, became the final variant of the Knight's Cross authorized.

== Recipients ==
Knight's Cross of the Iron Cross (Schu–Sz)
Service	Number of presentations	Posthumous presentations
Heer (incl. Volkssturm)	384	34
Kriegsmarine	21	1
Luftwaffe	158	16
Waffen-SS (incl. Allgemeine-SS)	40	1

The Oberkommando der Wehrmacht (Supreme Command of the Armed Forces) kept separate Knight's Cross lists, one for each of the three military branches, Heer (Army), Kriegsmarine (Navy), Luftwaffe (Air Force) and for the Waffen-SS. Within each of these lists a unique sequential number was assigned to each recipient. The same numbering paradigm was applied to the higher grades of the Knight's Cross, one list per grade. Of the 603 awards made to servicemen whose last name is in the range "Schu–Sz", 68 were later awarded the Knight's Cross of the Iron Cross with Oak Leaves, ten the Knight's Cross of the Iron Cross with Oak Leaves and Swords and two the Knight's Cross of the Iron Cross with Oak Leaves, Swords and Diamonds; 52 presentations were made posthumously. Heer members, including the Volkssturm, received 384 of the medals; 21 went to the Kriegsmarine, 158 to the Luftwaffe, and 40 to the Waffen-SS and Allgemeine SS. The sequential numbers greater than 843 for the Knight's Cross of the Iron Cross with Oak Leaves and 143 for the Knight's Cross of the Iron Cross with Oak Leaves and Swords are unofficial and were assigned by the Association of Knight's Cross Recipients (AKCR) and are therefore denoted in parentheses.

This along with the + (plus) indicates that a higher grade of Knight's Cross was awarded as well.
This along with the * (asterisk) indicates that the Knight's Cross was awarded posthumously.
This along with the ? (question mark) indicates that author Veit Scherzer has expressed doubt regarding the veracity and formal correctness of the listing.

Name	Service	Rank	Role and unit (Note: For an explanation of the various naming schemes used by the Luftwaffe, Heer, Kriegsmarine and Waffen-SS refer to nomenclature used by the Wehrmacht and Waffen-SS.)	Date of award	Notes	Image
Joachim Schubach	Waffen-SS	SS-Sturmbannführer	Commander of the II./SS-Panzergrenadier-Regiment "Totenkopf" (Note: According to Scherzer as commander of the III./SS-Panzergrenadier-Regiment 1 "Totenkopf".)	3 April 1943	—	—
Schubert? (Note: No evidence of the award can be found in the German Federal Archives. The files of the Order Commission of the Association of Knight's Cross Recipients (AKCR) contain no information. Schubert's case was also never discussed by the Order Commission. It remains unclear on what grounds Schubert was listed as a recipient of the Knight's Cross.)	Heer	Gefreiter	In the fortress Glogau	9 May 1945	—	—
Albrecht Schubert	Heer	General der Infanterie	Commanding general of the XXIII. Armeekorps	17 September 1941	—	
Carl-Heinz Schubert	Heer	Leutnant	Leader of the 9./Panzer-Artillerie-Regiment 2	18 April 1943	—	—
Günther Schubert	Heer	Oberstleutnant	Commander of the I./Infanterie-Regiment 49	5 June 1940	—	—
Gustav Schubert+	Luftwaffe	Oberfeldwebel	Pilot in the 8./Sturzkampfgeschwader 1 (Note: According to Scherzer as pilot in the 9./Sturzkampfgeschwader 1.)	22 May 1943	Awarded 629th Oak Leaves 24 October 1944	—
Paul-Georg Schubert	Heer	Oberfeldwebel	Zugführer (platoon leader) in the 3./Pionier-Bataillon 3 (motorized)	2 March 1944	—	—
Josef Schuck	Heer	Oberleutnant of the Reserves	Leader of the 3./Grenadier-Regiment 351	4 June 1944	—	—
Walter Schuck+	Luftwaffe	Oberfeldwebel	Pilot in the 7./Jagdgeschwader 5	8 April 1944	Awarded 616th Oak Leaves 30 September 1944	—
Helmut Schübel	Luftwaffe	Oberleutnant	Staffelkapitän of the 10.(Panzer)/Schlachtgeschwader 2 "Immelmann" (Note: According to Scherzer as Staffelführer of the 10.(Panzer)/Schlachtgeschwader 2 "Immelmann".)	18 November 1944	—	—
Hans Schüler	Heer	Major	Commander of Infanterie-Regiment 633	5 August 1940	—	—
Heinrich Schüler+	Heer	Hauptmann of the Reserves	Leader of the II./Infanterie-Regiment 525	18 September 1942	Awarded 218th Oak Leaves 2 April 1943	—
Herbert Schüler	Heer	Oberfeldwebel	Zugführer (platoon leader) in the 9./Grenadier-Regiment 697	12 August 1944	—	—
Willi Schülke+	Heer	Oberleutnant	Leader of the III./Ski-Jäger-Regiment 1	28 October 1944	Awarded 740th Oak Leaves 16 February 1945	—
Karl Schümers	Waffen-SS	SS-Sturmbannführer and Major of the Schupo	Commander of the II./SS-Polizei-Schützen-Regiment 1	30 September 1942	—	—
Otto Schünemann+	Heer	Oberst	Commander of Infanterie-Regiment 184	20 December 1941	Awarded 339th Oak Leaves 28 November 1943	—
Dipl.-Ing. Paul Schürmann	Heer	Generalmajor	Commander of the 25. Panzergrenadier-Division	2 September 1944	—	—
Fritz Schürmeyer	Luftwaffe	Oberleutnant	Staffelkapitän of the 3.(F)/Aufklärungs-Gruppe des OB der Luftwaffe (Note: According to Scherzer as Staffelkapitän of the Aufklärungsstaffel 3.(F)/OB der Luftwaffe.)	1 October 1940	—	—
Josef Schüßler	Heer	Feldwebel	Zugführer (platoon leader) in the 5./Grenadier-Regiment 106	14 June 1943	—	—
Christian Schuett	Luftwaffe	Oberfeldwebel	Pilot in the 1./Schlachtgeschwader 77	18 November 1944	—	—
Fritz Schütt	Heer	Hauptmann of the Reserves	Leader of the II./Grenadier-Regiment 502	26 March 1943	—	—
Kurt Schütt	Heer	Major	Commander of Feld-Ersatz-Bataillon 299	14 February 1945	—	—
Ludwig Schütte	Heer	Major	Commander of Divisions-Füsilier-Bataillon 131	23 February 1944	—	—
Wilhelm Schütten	Heer	Oberfeldwebel	Zugführer (platoon leader) in the 3./Panzergrenadier-Regiment 4	4 June 1944	—	—
Erwin Schütz? (Note: Erwin Schütz's nomination by his unit was submitted via the command chain on 29 March 1945, which was approved by the 19. Armee on 18 April. The commentary of the Heeresgruppe G is missing. There is also no entry date noted by the Heerespersonalamt (HPA—Army Staff Office). Also no processing or presentation comments had been noted. He is listed in the files for rejected or unfinished nominations. According to the Association of Knight's Cross Recipients (AKCR) the award was presented in accordance with the Dönitz-decree. This is illegal according to the Deutsche Dienststelle (WASt) and lacks legal justification. The presentation date was assigned by Walther-Peer Fellgiebel. Schütz was a member of the AKCR.)	Heer	Hauptmann	Commander of the II./Grenadier-Regiment 1127	9 May 1945	—	—
Harald von Schütz	Heer	Major	Commander of Panzer-Aufklärungs-Abteilung 7	5 April 1945*	Killed in action 1 April 1945	—
Hermann Schütz	Heer	Hauptmann of the Reserves	Leader of the I./Grenadier-Regiment 273	21 April 1944	—	—
Rudolf Schütze	Luftwaffe	Leutnant	Pilot in the Wettererkundungsstaffel 5	14 March 1943	—	—
Viktor Schütze+	Kriegsmarine	Korvettenkapitän	Commander of U-103	11 December 1940	Awarded 23rd Oak Leaves 14 July 1941	
Otto Schug	Heer	Unteroffizier	Group leader of the 2./Pionier-Bataillon 235	3 November 1944*	Died of wounds 19 September 1944	—
Otto Schuhart	Kriegsmarine	Kapitänleutnant	Commander of U-29	16 May 1940	—	—
Leo Schuhmacher	Luftwaffe	Leutnant	Pilot in the II./Jagdgeschwader 1	1 March 1945	—	—
Hinrich Schuldt+	Waffen-SS	SS-Obersturmbannführer	Commander of SS-Totenkopf-Regiment 4 (Note: According to Scherzer as SS-Infanterie-Regiment 4 "Reichsführer-SS".)	5 April 1942	Awarded 220th Oak Leaves 2 April 1943; 56th Swords 25 March 1944	—
Wolf-Werner Graf von der Schulenburg	Luftwaffe	Major	Commander of the I./Fallschirmjäger-Regiment 1	20 June 1943	—	—
Emil Schuler	Heer	Oberst	Commander of Gebirgsjäger-Regiment 218	9 December 1944	—	—
Sebastian Schuller	Heer	Unteroffizier	Geschützführer (gun layer) in the 1./Panzer-Jäger-Abteilung 10 (motorized) (Note: According to Scherzer as Geschützführer (gun layer) in the 1./Panzer-Jäger-Abteilung 10.)	31 July 1943	—	—
Ernst Schulte	Luftwaffe	Obergefreiter	Geschützführer (gun layer) in the 1./Flak-Regiment 14 (motorized) (Note: According to Scherzer as Geschützführer (gun layer) in the 1./Flak-Regiment 14.)	23 January 1942*	Died of wounds 17 April 1942	—
Franz Schulte	Luftwaffe	Feldwebel	Pilot in the 6./Jagdgeschwader 77	24 September 1942	—	—
Helmuth Schulte	Luftwaffe	Hauptmann	Gruppenkommandeur of the II./Nachtjagdgeschwader 6	17 April 1945	—	—
Hubert Schulte	Heer	Hauptmann of the Reserves	Leader of the I./Panzergrenadier-Regiment 1 Führer-Grenadier-Division (Note: According to Scherzer as leader of the I./Führer-Grenadier-Regiment 1.)	30 April 1945	—	—
Hermann Schulte-Heuthaus	Heer	Oberstleutnant	Commander of Kradschützen-Bataillon 25	23 January 1942	—	—
Erich Schultz	Heer	Hauptmann	Leader of the I./Grenadier-Regiment 94	22 January 1944	—	—
Fritz-Rudolf Schultz+	Heer	Hauptmann of the Reserves	Commander of the I./Panzer-Regiment 35	21 April 1944	Awarded 636th Oak Leaves 28 October 1944	—
Harald Schultz	Heer	Generalmajor	Commander of the 24. Infanterie-Division	5 April 1945	—	—
Otto Schultz	Luftwaffe	Oberfeldwebel	Pilot in the 4./Jagdgeschwader 51 "Mölders"	14 March 1943	—	—
Paul Schultz+	Heer	Oberst	Commander of Infanterie-Regiment 308	3 September 1942	Awarded 284th Oak Leaves 26 August 1943	—
Willi Schultz	Luftwaffe	Feldwebel	Pilot in the 6./Kampfgeschwader 30	19 June 1940	—	—
Heinz-Otto Schultze	Kriegsmarine	Kapitänleutnant	Commander of U-432	9 July 1942	—	A smiling man wearing a peaked cap and dark military uniform with an Iron Cross displayed at the front of his uniform collar.
Herbert Schultze+	Kriegsmarine	Kapitänleutnant	Commander of U-48	1 March 1940	Awarded 15th Oak Leaves 12 June 1941	The head and shoulders of a young man, shown in semi-profile. He wears a greatcoat and his Iron Cross is visible at the front of his shirt collar. He wears a determined expression.
Adelbert Schulz+	Heer	Hauptmann	Chief of the 1./Panzer-Regiment 25	29 September 1940	Awarded 47th Oak Leaves 31 December 1941; 33rd Swords 6 August 1943; 9th Diamonds 14 December 1943	The head and shoulders of an elderly man, shown in partial profile. He wears a field cap and a military uniform and an Iron Cross displayed at the front of his camouflage shirt collar.
Artur Schulz	Heer	Major	Commander of the I./Infanterie-Regiment 233	7 August 1942	—	—
Bruno-Richard Schulz	Luftwaffe	Oberfeldwebel	Pilot in the 4./Schlachtgeschwader 77 (Note: According to Scherzer as pilot in the II./Schlachtgeschwader 77.)	29 October 1944*	Killed in action 25 August 1944	—
Dr. Erich Schulz	Heer	Major of the Reserves	Commander of the I./Grenadier-Regiment 6	10 September 1944	—	—
Friedrich Schulz+	Heer	Oberst im Generalstab (in the General Staff)	Chief of the General Staff of the XXXXIII. Armeekorps	29 March 1942	Awarded 428th Oak Leaves 20 March 1944; 135th Swords 26 February 1945	—
Friedrich Schulz	Heer	Oberfeldwebel	Zugführer (platoon leader) in Feld-Ersatz-Bataillon 361	9 June 1944	—	—
Hans-Otto Schulz	Luftwaffe	Oberleutnant	Chief of the 4./leichte Flak-Abteilung 753 (Note: According to Scherzer as chief of the 4./leichte Flak-Abteilung (deployable) 753.)	9 January 1945	—	—
Heinrich Schulz (Note: According to Scherzer name is spelled Heinrich Schultz.)	Heer	Gefreiter	Flammenwerferschütze (flame thrower) in the 3./Pionier-Bataillon 161	18 October 1941	—	—
Helmut Schulz	Heer	Leutnant	Leader of the 5./Grenadier-Regiment 96	20 October 1944	—	—
Johannes Schulz	Heer	Major	Commander of the I./Infanterie-Regiment 49	6 October 1941	—	—
Dr. phil. Johannes Schulz	Heer	Oberst	Commander of Panzergrenadier-Regiment 10	19 September 1943	—	—
Karl Schulz	Heer	Major of the Reserves	Commander of the I./Infanterie-Regiment 699	18 September 1942	—	—
Karl Schulz	Kriegsmarine	Oberleutnant zur See of the Reserves	Group leader and commander of Vorpostenboot VP-1509 in the 15. Vorpostenflottille	26 August 1944	—	—
Karl-Heinrich Schulz	Luftwaffe	Generalmajor	Chief of the Generalstab Luftflotte 4	9 June 1944	—	—
Karl-Lothar Schulz+	Luftwaffe	Hauptmann	Commander of the III./Fallschirmjäger-Regiment 1	24 May 1940	Awarded 459th Oak Leaves 20 April 1944; 112th Swords 18 November 1944	A man wearing a military uniform with an Iron Cross displayed at the front of his uniform collar.
Ludwig Schulz+	Luftwaffe	Major	Gruppenkommandeur of the I./Kampfgeschwader 76	16 August 1940	Awarded 747th Oak Leaves 19 February 1945	—
Manfred Schulz	Heer	Hauptmann	Commander of the I./Grenadier-Regiment 23	10 September 1944	—	—
Otto Schulz	Heer	Oberleutnant	Chief of the 3./Infanterie-Regiment 125	19 June 1940	—	—
Otto Schulz	Luftwaffe	Oberfeldwebel	Pilot in the II./Jagdgeschwader 27	22 February 1942	—	—
Otto Schulz	Kriegsmarine	Konteradmiral	Seekommandant Krim (sea commander Crimea) (Note: According to Scherzer as commander of the sea defence of the Crimea.)	17 May 1944	—	—
Georg-Wilhelm Schulz	Kriegsmarine	Kapitänleutnant	Commander of U-124	4 April 1941	—	—
Karl-Heinz Schulz-Lepel	Heer	Oberleutnant of the Reserves	Chief of the 6./Grenadier-Regiment 552	13 September 1943	—	—
Dr. med. Hans-Joachim Schulz-Merkel	Heer	Stabsarzt (rank equivalent to Hauptmann)	Truppenarzt (battalion surgeon) in the I./Panzer-Regiment 35 (Note: According to Scherzer as a divisional doctor in the I./Panzer-Regiment 35.)	23 December 1943	—	—
Karlheinz Schulz-Streeck? (Note: Karlheinz Schulz-Streeck was nominated by the commander-in-chief North via teleprinter message on 11 May 1945. The Heerespersonalamt Außenstelle (HPA/A—Branch of the Army Staff Office) received the message on 13 May 1945. There is no further indication available that the nomination was processed or awarded. Schulz-Streeck is not listed on the HPA/A presentation list. The registry of rejected or deferred nominations contains his nomination file card only. According to the Association of Knight's Cross Recipients (AKCR) the presentation was made in accordance with the Dönitz-decree. This is illegal according to the Deutsche Dienststelle (WASt) and lacks legal justification. The presentation date was assigned by Walther-Peer Fellgiebel. Schulz-Streeck was a member of the AKCR.)	Waffen-SS	SS-Sturmbannführer of the Reserves	Commander of SS-Sturmgeschütz-Abteilung 11 "Nordland"	9 May 1945	—	—
Franz-Joseph Schulze	Luftwaffe	Oberleutnant (Note: According to Scherzer as Oberleutnant of the Reserves.)	Chief of the 3./Flak-Sturm-Regiment 241	30 November 1944	—	—
Hans-Christian Schulze	Waffen-SS	SS-Standartenführer and Oberst of the Schupo	Commander of SS-Polizei-Schützen-Regiment 2	11 September 1941	—	—
Heinrich Schulze	Heer	Stabsfeldwebel	Zugführer (platoon leader) in the 2./Panzer-Abteilung 116	14 August 1943	—	—
Herbert Schulze	Waffen-SS	SS-Sturmbannführer	Commander of the II./SS-Panzergrenadier-Regiment 4 "Der Führer"	16 December 1943	—	—
Johannes Schulze	Heer	Hauptmann of the Reserves	Commander of the I./Grenadier-Regiment 191	14 January 1945	—	—
Kurt Schulze	Heer	Major	Commander of the I./Panzergrenadier-Regiment 3	14 April 1945	—	—
Otto Schulze	Heer	Leutnant of the Reserves	Leader of the 8./Infanterie-Regiment 386	19 June 1942	—	—
Paul Schulze+	Heer	Hauptmann	Commander of the II./Panzer-Regiment 21 (Note: According to Scherzer as commander of the Panzer-Regiment 21.)	30 December 1943	Awarded 538th Oak Leaves 28 July 1944	—
Walter Schulze	Heer	Feldwebel	Zugführer (platoon leader) in the 6./Grenadier-Regiment 9	5 April 1944	—	—
Werner Schulze+	Heer	Major of the Reserves	Commander of the II./Infanterie-Regiment 510	1 March 1942	Awarded 557th Oak Leaves 23 August 1944	—
Dr. Wolfgang Schulze	Luftwaffe	Oberleutnant	Pilot in the 1.(H)/Aufklärungs-Gruppe 5 (Note: According to Scherzer as pilot in the 1./Nahaufklärungsgruppe 5.)	17 March 1945	—	—
Fritz Schulze-Dickow	Luftwaffe	Oberleutnant	Staffelkapitän of the 8./Zerstörergeschwader 26 "Horst Wessel"	7 March 1942	—	—
Alfred Schulze-Hinrichs	Kriegsmarine	Kapitän zur See	Chief of the 6. Zerstörerflottille	15 June 1943	—	—
Carl-Alfred Schumacher (Note: According to Scherzer name is Carl-August Schumacher.)	Luftwaffe	Oberstleutnant	Geschwaderkommodore of Jagdgeschwader 1	21 July 1940	—	—
Gerd Schumacher	Heer	Leutnant of the Reserves	Leader of the 5./Grenadier-Regiment 337	15 January 1944*	Killed in action 10 December 1943	—
Kurt Schumacher	Waffen-SS	SS-Untersturmführer	Leader of the 3./SS-Panzer-Regiment 5 "Wiking" (Note: According to Scherzer as leader of the 3./SS-Panzer-Regiment 5.)	4 May 1944	—	—
Paul Schumacher	Heer	Oberleutnant of the Reserves	Chief of the 2./Grenadier-Regiment 427	11 December 1943	—	—
Heinz Schumann	Luftwaffe	Hauptmann	Staffelkapitän of the 10./Jagdgeschwader 2 "Richthofen"	18 March 1943	—	—
Karl Schunck	Heer	Hauptmann	Leader of the II./Grenadier-Regiment 157	9 June 1944	—	—
Wilhelm Schuncke	Heer	Oberleutnant of the Reserves	Leader of the II./Sturm-Regiment Armee-Oberkommando 4	28 March 1945*	Died of wounds 18 February 1945	—
Hans Schurig	Heer	Oberstleutnant	Commander of Grenadier-Regiment 260	28 January 1943	—	—
Gerhard Schurreit	Heer	Oberfeldwebel	Zugführer (platoon leader) in the 4./Grenadier-Regiment 44	26 November 1944	—	—
Otto Schury+	Heer	Major	Commander of the II./Gebirgsjäger-Regiment 100	17 July 1941	Awarded 592nd Oak Leaves 21 September 1944	—
Joseph Schuss	Heer	Obergefreiter	Machine gunner in the 3./Infanterie-Regiment 520	4 September 1942	—	—
Erich Schuster	Luftwaffe	Feldwebel	Group leader in the 3./Fallschirmjäger-Sturm-Regiment (Note: According to Scherzer as group leader in the 3./Luftlande-Sturm-Regiment 1.)	21 August 1941	—	—
Karl Schuster	Heer	Obergefreiter	Richtschütze (gunner) in the 8./Panzergrenadier-Regiment 126	5 February 1945	—	—
Theo Schwabach	Luftwaffe	Oberleutnant	Battery chief in the I./Flak-Regiment 33 (motorized) (Note: According to Scherzer as battery chief in the I./Flak-Regiment 33.)	30 June 1941	—	—
Josef Schwabenberger	Heer	Feldwebel	Zugführer (platoon leader) in the 2./Grenadier-Regiment 467	10 September 1943	—	—
Günther Schwärzel	Luftwaffe	Hauptmann	Staffelkapitän of the 9./Sturzkampfgeschwader 2 "Immelmann"	22 June 1941 (Note: According to Scherzer on 24 June 1941.)	—	—
Franz Schwaiger	Luftwaffe	Unteroffizier	Pilot in the 6./Jagdgeschwader 3 "Udet" (Note: According to Scherzer as pilot in the I./Jagdgeschwader 3 "Udet".)	29 October 1942	—	—
Helmut Schwalb	Heer	Hauptmann	Chief of the 1./Sturmgeschütz-Brigade 190	23 August 1944	—	—
Eugen-Felix Schwalbe	Heer	Oberst	Commander of Infanterie-Regiment 461	13 July 1940	—	
Richard Schwamberger	Heer	Hauptmann	Commander of the III./Grenadier-Regiment 117	20 April 1943	—	—
Walter Schwanbeck	Heer	Unteroffizier	Group leader in the 2./Reiter-Regiment 31	5 October 1944*	Killed on active service 30 August 1944	—
Edgar Schwaneberg	Luftwaffe	Hauptmann	Staffelkapitän of the 2./Transportgeschwader 3	26 March 1944	—	—
Joachim Schwanitz? (Note: Joachim Schwanitz's nomination was received by the Heerespersonalamt (HPA—Army Staff Office) on 19 April 1945. The book of "Verliehene Ritterkreuze" (Awarded Knight Crosses) contains his entry under Nr. 5149 which was approved by Major Joachim Domaschk on 21 April 1945. The file contains no further evidence of the approval or presentation of the award. According to the Association of Knight's Cross Recipients (AKCR) the award was presented in accordance with the Dönitz-decree. This is illegal according to the Deutsche Dienststelle (WASt) and lacks legal justification. The presentation date was assigned by Walther-Peer Fellgiebel.)	Heer	Hauptmann	Leader of the II./Grenadier-Regiment 3	9 May 1945	—	—
Oskar Schwappacher	Waffen-SS	SS-Hauptsturmführer	Commander of the V./SS-Artillerie-Ausbildungs und Ersatz-Regiment and leader of a Kampfgruppe (Note: According to Scherzer as commander of SS-Ersatz-Abteilung of the SS-Polizei-Division.)	26 December 1944	—	—
Hugo Schwark	Heer	Oberleutnant of the Reserves	Leader of the I./Grenadier-Regiment 911	23 October 1944	—	—
Kurt Schwarm	Heer	Obergefreiter	Krad-messenger (dispatch rider) in the Stab/Panzergrenadier-Regiment 98	11 January 1945	—	—
Heinrich Schwarting	Heer	Hauptmann of the Reserves	Chief of the 6./Infanterie-Regiment 154	15 August 1940	—	—
Günter Schwartzkopff	Luftwaffe	Oberst	Geschwaderkommodore of Sturzkampfgeschwader 77	24 November 1940*	Killed in action 14 May 1940	A man wearing a peaked cap and a military uniform with an Iron Cross displayed at the front of his uniform collar.
Friedrich Schwarz	Heer	Oberleutnant of the Reserves	Leader of the 3./Panzergrenadier-Regiment 35	21 January 1945	—	—
Heinrich Schwarz	Heer	Obergefreiter	Richtkanonier (gunner) in the 10./Artillerie-Regiment 3 (motorized)	15 January 1943	—	—
Manfred Schwarz	Heer	Leutnant of the Reserves	Chief of the 1./Panzer-Jäger-Abteilung 10 (motorized) (Note: According to Scherzer as chief of the 1./Panzer-Jäger-Abteilung 10.)	25 August 1941	—	—
Josef Schwarzenbacher	Heer	Unteroffizier of the Reserves (Note: According to Scherzer as Unteroffizier.)	Geschützführer (gun layer) of the 1./Sturmgeschütz-Brigade 912	27 August 1944*	Killed in action 16 August 1944	—
Emil-Gerhard Schwarzer	Heer	Oberleutnant of the Reserves	Adjutant in the II./Artillerie-Regiment 158	23 February 1944	—	—
Otto Schwarzer	Heer	Hauptmann	Commander of the I./Infanterie-Regiment 187	6 October 1942	—	—
Rudolf Schwarzgruber	Heer	Oberjäger	Heavy machine gun leader in the 10./Gebirgsjäger-Regiment 13	30 April 1945	—	—
Alfred Schwarzmann	Luftwaffe	Oberleutnant	Zugführer (platoon leader) in the 8./Fallschirmjäger-Regiment 1	24 May 1940 (Note: According to Scherzer on 29 May 1940.)	—	
Rudolf Schwarzrock	Heer	Major	Commander of the I./Panzergrenadier-Regiment "Großdeutschland"	19 August 1944	—	—
Hugo Schwede	Heer	Leutnant (Note: According to Scherzer as Leutnant of the Reserves.)	Leader of Nachrichtenzug/Grenadier-Regiment 82	5 January 1944*	Killed in action 10 November 1943	—
Viktor von Schwedler	Heer	General der Infanterie	Commanding general IV. Armeekorps	29 June 1940	—	—
Matthias Schwegler	Luftwaffe	Oberleutnant	Staffelkapitän in the I./Kampfgeschwader 51	18 December 1941	—	—
Heinrich Schweickhardt+	Luftwaffe	Oberleutnant	Staffelkapitän of the 8./Kampfgeschwader 76	4 February 1942	Awarded 138th Oak Leaves 30 October 1942	—
Franz Schweiger	Luftwaffe	Oberleutnant	Chief of the 8./Flak-Regiment 25	14 February 1942	—	—
Heinz-Herbert Schweim	Heer	Major im Generalstab (in the General Staff)	Ia (operations officer) in Fallschirm-Panzergrenadier-Division 2 "Hermann Göring"	28 February 1945	—	—
Heinz Schweitzer	Heer	Gefreiter	Machine gunner in the 13./Panzergrenadier-Regiment 103	9 July 1944	—	—
Willi Schweitzer? (Note: No evidence of the award can be found in the German Federal Archives. Walther-Peer Fellgiebel claims that the award was presented by SS-Brigadeführer Wilhelm Mohnke in the Bunker of the Reich Chancellery. Willi Schweitzer however and his unit where stationed southwest of Rechnitz and had nothing to do with the Reich Chancellery. The presentation date, according to Ernst-Günther Krätschmer, is the 14 April 1945. Schweitzer is not listed in the 1955 nor in the 1976 edition of Von Seemen's book Die Ritterkreuzträger 1939–1945 : die Ritterkreuzträger sämtlicher Wehrmachtteile, Brillanten-, Schwerter- und Eichenlaubträger in der Reihenfolge der Verleihung : Anhang mit Verleihungsbestimmungen und weiteren Angaben [The Knight's Cross Bearers 1939–1945 : The Knight's Cross Bearers of All the Armed Services, Diamonds, Swords and Oak Leaves Bearers in the Order of Presentation: Appendix with Further Information and Presentation Requirements]. The author Veit Scherzer was denied access to the files of the Association of Knight's Cross Recipients (AKCR) on the grounds of the Bundesarchivgesetz (German Archive Law).)	Waffen-SS	SS-Sturmbannführer	Commander of SS-Panzergrenadier Ausbildungs- und Ersatz-Bataillon 11 and leader of a Kampfgruppe	24 April 1945	—	—
Heinz Schweizer	Luftwaffe	Hauptmann (W) (Note: The suffix W in brackets after the rank denotes a Feuerwerker (pyrotechnician).)	Leader of Sprengkommando 1/IV Ratingen-Düsseldorf (Note: According to Scherzer as leader of Sprengkommando of the Luftwaffe 1/VI Ratingen-Düsseldorf.)	28 June 1943	—	—
Ignatz Schweizer	Luftwaffe	Feldwebel	Pilot in the 8./Schlachtgeschwader 10	30 September 1944	—	—
Herbert Schwender+	Heer	Major	Leader of Grenadier-Regiment 3	11 March 1943	Awarded 442nd Oak Leaves 6 April 1944	—
Johann Schwerdfeger+	Heer	Feldwebel	Zugführer (platoon leader) in the 1./Jäger-Regiment 228	17 May 1943	Awarded 474th Oak Leaves 14 May 1944	—
Albert von Schwerin	Luftwaffe	Leutnant of the Reserves	Pilot in the I./Kampfgeschwader 26 (Note: According to Scherzer as pilot in the 1./Kampfgeschwader 26.)	31 July 1940	—	—
Gerhard von Schwerin+	Heer	Oberst	Commander of Infanterie-Regiment 76 (motorized)	17 January 1942	Awarded 240th Oak Leaves 17 May 1943; 41st Swords 4 November 1943	
Werner Schwerin	Heer	Feldwebel	Zugführer (platoon leader) in the 9./Füsilier-Regiment 27	21 December 1944	—	—
Otto Schwerk	Heer	Hauptmann	Commander of the I./Grenadier-Regiment 96	15 July 1944	—	—
Paul Schwermann	Heer	Hauptmann	Leader of Heeres-Flak-Abteilung 315	11 March 1945	—	—
Josef Schwertherr	Heer	Unteroffizier	Group leader in the I./Infanterie-Regiment 77 (Note: According to Scherzer as group leader in the 1./Infanterie-Regiment 77.)	6 October 1942	—	—
Hans-Gunnar Schwieger	Heer	Major	Commander of Divisions-Füsilier-Bataillon 72	23 September 1943	—	—
Helmut Schwill	Heer	Hauptmann	Leader of the I./Grenadier-Regiment 45	17 March 1944	—	—
Hellmuth Schwing	Heer	Major	Commander of Panzer-Pionier-Bataillon 39	30 December 1943	—	—
Hans Schwirblat	Luftwaffe	Leutnant	Pilot in the 1./Schlachtgeschwader 2 "Immelmann" (Note: According to Scherzer as pilot in the I./Schlachtgeschwader 2 "Immelmann".)	20 July 1944	—	—
Heinz Schwöppe	Heer	Hauptmann	Commander of Feld-Ersatz-Bataillon 21 (L)	26 March 1945	—	—
Friedrich von Scotti	Heer	Generalleutnant	Commander of the 227. Infanterie-Division	8 June 1943	—	—
Erich Freiherr von Seckendorff	Heer	Oberstleutnant	Commander of Kradschützen-Bataillon 6	4 September 1940	—	—
Karl Seckler	Heer	Hauptmann	Commander of the II./Panzergrenadier-Regiment 13	23 August 1944*	Killed in action 17 July 1944	Karl Seckler awarded Knight's Cross posthumously.
Walter Seebach	Waffen-SS	SS-Obersturmführer	Leader of the 5./SS-Freiwilligen-Panzergrenadier-Regiment 24 "Danmark" (Note: According to Scherzer as leader of the 5./SS-Panzergrenadier-Regiment 24 "Danmark".)	12 March 1944	—	—
Bernhard-Georg von Seebeck	Heer	Hauptmann	Leader of the I./Grenadier-Regiment 361 (motorized)	14 October 1944 (Note: According to Scherzer on 4 October 1944.)	—	—
Helmut Seeber	Heer	Hauptmann	Commander of the II./Jäger-Regiment 229	5 April 1945	—	—
Werner Seeber	Heer	Obergefreiter	Richtschütze (gunner) in the 14./Grenadier-Regiment 952	16 April 1944	—	—
Günther Seeger	Luftwaffe	Leutnant	Pilot in the 7./Jagdgeschwader 53	26 March 1944	—	—
Max Seela	Waffen-SS	SS-Hauptsturmführer	Chief of the 3./SS-Pionier-Bataillon "Totenkopf"	3 May 1942	—	a man wearing a military uniform with various military decorations including an Iron Cross at his neck.
Georg Seelmann	Luftwaffe	Leutnant (Note: According to Scherzer as Leutnant of the Reserves.)	Staffelkapitän of the 11./Jagdgeschwader 51	6 October 1941	—	—
Hans Sehringer	Luftwaffe	Oberleutnant	Pilot in the 2.(F)/Aufklärungs-Gruppe 123 (Note: According to Scherzer as pilot in the Aufklärungsstaffel 2.(F)/123.)	9 December 1942	—	—
Robert Seib	Luftwaffe	Oberleutnant	Staffelkapitän of the 6./Kampfgeschwader 55	9 October 1943	—	—
Josef Seibel	Heer	Leutnant of the Reserves	Leader of the 1./Grenadier-Regiment 332	4 May 1944	—	—
Günther Seibicke	Kriegsmarine	Kapitänleutnant	Commander of U-436	27 March 1943	—	—
Emil Seibold? (Note: No evidence of the award can be found in the German Federal Archives. The award was unlawfully presented by SS-Oberstgruppenführer Sepp Dietrich. The order commission of the Association of Knight's Cross Recipients (AKCR) processed the case in 1982 and decided: "Knight's Cross yes, 6 May 1945". The date is taken from the announcement made by the 6. SS-Panzerarmee. Seibold was a member of the AKCR.)	Waffen-SS	SS-Hauptscharführer	Zugführer (platoon leader) in the 8./SS-Panzer-Regiment 2 "Das Reich"	6 May 1945	—	—
Erich Seidel	Heer	Oberst	Commander of the Grenadier-Regiment 236	10 September 1944	—	—
Dr. jur. Heinrich Seidel	Heer	Oberleutnant	Leader of the II./Infanterie-Regiment 422	14 December 1941	—	—
Hans Seidemann+	Luftwaffe	Oberst im Generalstab (in the General Staff)	Chief of the General Staff of Luftflotte 2	20 March 1942	Awarded 658th Oak Leaves 18 November 1944	
August Seidensticker	Heer	Major	Leader of schwere Panzer-Abteilung 504 (Note: According to Scherzer on 18 July 1943 and as leader of schwere Panzer-Abteilung 501.)	17 July 1943	—	—
Dr. jur. Herbert Seidenstücker	Heer	Hauptmann of the Reserves	Commander of the II./Grenadier-Regiment 428	18 November 1943	—	—
Josef Seidl	Heer	Oberfeldwebel	Zugführer (platoon leader) in Grenadier-Regiment 520 (Note: According to Scherzer as Zugführer (platoon leader) in Pionier-Zug/Grenadier-Regiment 520.)	15 May 1944	—	—
Ernst Seifert	Heer	Major	Commander of the II./schweres Artillerie-Regiment 48	29 September 1940	—	—
Hans Seifert	Heer	Leutnant	Zugführer (platoon leader) in the 13./Grenadier-Regiment 952	9 June 1944*	Killed in action 26 March 1944	—
Johannes Seifert	Luftwaffe	Hauptmann	Gruppenkommandeur of the I./Jagdgeschwader 26 "Schlageter"	7 June 1942	—	—
Werner Seifert	Heer	Hauptmann of the Reserves	Commander of the I./Grenadier-Regiment 95	2 September 1944	—	—
Heinz Seiffert	Luftwaffe	Oberleutnant	Staffelkapitän of the 3./Kampfgeschwader 3	31 December 1943	—	—
Alfred Seiler	Heer	Leutnant (Note: According to Scherzer as Leutnant of the Reserves and leader of a Stabskompanie in the 389. Infanterie-Division.)	Leader of the division Stabskompanie 389. Infanterie-Division	5 April 1945	—	—
Herbert Seiler	Heer	Leutnant of the Reserves	Leader of the 11./Grenadier-Regiment 445	7 September 1943	—	—
Reinhard Seiler+	Luftwaffe	Hauptmann	Gruppenkommandeur of the III./Jagdgeschwader 54	20 December 1941	Awarded 419th Oak Leaves 2 March 1944	—
Adolf Seitz	Heer	Major	Commander of the II./Gebirgsjäger-Regiment 99	5 August 1940	—	—
Hermann Seitz+	Heer	Oberstleutnant	Commander of Aufklärungs-Abteilung 20 (motorized)	12 April 1942	Awarded 140th Oak Leaves 31 October 1942	—
Rudolf Seitz	Waffen-SS	SS-Unterscharführer and Wachtmeister of the Schupo	Geschützführer (gun layer) in the 1./SS-Polizei-Panzer-Jäger-Abteilung	21 October 1942	—	—
Alfred Sekund	Heer	Wachtmeister	Vorgeschobener Beobachter (forward observer) in the 6./Artillerie-Regiment 11	10 September 1944	—	—
Eugen Selhorst	Heer	Oberleutnant	Leader of the I./Infanterie-Regiment 186	6 October 1942	—	—
Karl Selinger	Heer	Feldwebel	Zugführer (platoon leader) in the Stabskompanie II./Gebirgsjäger-Regiment 144	12 December 1944	—	—
Hans-Joachim Sell	Heer	Hauptmann	Commander of Panzer-Aufklärungs-Abteilung 8	14 April 1945	—	—
Hermann Sell	Luftwaffe	Major	Leader of Flak-Regiment 48 (motorized)	9 June 1944	—	—
Wilhelm Sell	Luftwaffe	Major	Gruppenkommandeur of Nahaufklärungs-Gruppe 5	5 September 1944	—	—
Erich Selle	Heer	Hauptmann of the Reserves	Chief of the 12./Infanterie-Regiment 410	9 December 1942	—	—
Waldemar Semelka	Luftwaffe	Leutnant	Pilot in the 4./Jagdgeschwader 52	4 September 1942*	Killed in action 21 August 1942	—
Wolfgang Semmer	Heer	Leutnant	Chief of the 5./Infanterie-Regiment 85	24 June 1940	—	—
Günther Sempert	Luftwaffe	Hauptmann	Chief of the 5./Fallschirm-Panzer-Jäger-Abteilung 1 (Note: According to Scherzer as leader of Fallschirm-Panzer-Jäger-Abteilung 1.)	30 September 1944	—	A smiling man wearing a peaked cap, military uniform with an Iron Cross displayed at the front of his uniform collar.
Norbert Semrau	Heer	Leutnant of the Reserves	Zugführer (platoon leader) in the 1./Grenadier-Regiment 29 (motorized)	6 April 1944	—	—
Paul Semrau+	Luftwaffe	Hauptmann	Staffelkapitän of the 3./Nachtjagdgeschwader 2	7 October 1942	Awarded 841st Oak Leaves 17 April 1945	A man wearing a military uniform with an Iron Cross displayed at the front of his uniform collar.
Paul Semrau	Heer	Leutnant	Leader of the 7./Panzergrenadier-Regiment 25	30 September 1944	—	A man wearing a camouflage military uniform with an Iron Cross displayed at the front of his uniform collar.
Ott-Friedrich Senfft von Pilsach	Heer	Oberleutnant	Chief of the 4./Panzer-Regiment 5	27 June 1941	—	—
Josef Senft	Heer	Leutnant (Note: According to Scherzer as Leutnant of the Reserves.)	Leader of the 6./Grenadier-Regiment 1122	11 March 1945	—	—
Fridolin von Senger und Etterlin+	Heer	Generalmajor	Commander of the 17. Panzer-Division	8 February 1943	Awarded 439th Oak Leaves 5 April 1944	A man wearing a military uniform with an Iron Cross displayed at the front of his uniform collar.
Paul Senghas	Waffen-SS	SS-Obersturmführer	Leader of the 1./SS-Panzer-Regiment 5 "Wiking" (Note: According to Scherzer as leader of the 1./SS-Panzer-Regiment 5.)	11 December 1944	—	—
Fritz Sengschmitt	Luftwaffe	Oberleutnant	Pilot in the I./Kampfgeschwader 2	24 September 1942	—	—
Kārlis Sensbergs? (Note: According to Scherzer Kārlis Sensbergs' last name is spelled Senbergs. His nomination to the Knight's Cross by his unit was received by teleprinter message on 5 April 1945. According to the file card it was immediately forwarded for further processing. The file card of the Heerespersonalamt (HPA—Army Staff Office) was not retained and remained unfinished by the end of the war. Mr Meentz of the German Federal Archives stated on 20 July 2004 that it can not be verified that Senbergs received the Knight's Cross. The order commission of the Association of Knight's Cross Recipients (AKCR) processed the case in 1981 and decided: "Knight's Cross yes, 9 May 1945". While Krätschmer also states the 9 May 1945, Walther-Peer Fellgiebel changed this again later.)	Waffen-SS	Waffen-Unterscharführer	Group leader in the alarm-unit of the 19. Waffen-Grenadier-Division der SS	11 May 1945	—	—
Franz Sensfuß+	Heer	Generalleutnant	Commander of the 212. Infanterie-Division	22 August 1944	Awarded (881st) Oak Leaves 9 May 1945? (Note: Franz Sensfuß nomination for the Oak Leaves was received by the Heerespersonalamt (HPA—Army Staff Office) from his unit on 14 March 1945. Major Joachim Domaschk requested by teleprinter message the advisory opinion from the Commander-in-Chief of Armee-Oberkommando 1 and Heeresgruppe B. The 212. Volks-Grenadier-Division at the time was being encircled by US forces in the vicinity of Baumholder and went into captivity. Major Domaschk had sent a radio message to the nominating commander of the LXXX. Armeekorps: "Nomination deferred according to AHA 44 Ziff. 572." Domaschk noted on the nomination: "Deferred, because missing in action!" A presentation was never made. Sensfuß is not listed in the book for the "nominations for the higher grades of the Knight's Cross of the Iron Cross" nor in the nomination book for Knight's Cross (starting with Nr. 5100). The sequential number "881" was assigned by the Association of Knight's Cross Recipients (AKCR), the presentation date by Walther-Peer Fellgiebel.)	—
Julius Serck	Heer	Oberwachtmeister	Zugführer (platoon leader) in the 3./Sturmgeschütz-Brigade 300	23 March 1945	—	—
Kurt Settner	Heer	Hauptmann	Leader of the II./Grenadier-Regiment 1076	18 November 1944	—	—
Heinrich Setz+	Luftwaffe	Oberleutnant	Staffelkapitän of the 4./Jagdgeschwader 77	31 December 1941	Awarded 102nd Oak Leaves 23 June 1942	—
Richard Seuss+	Kriegsmarine	Oberleutnant (M.A.) of the Reserves	Chief of the coastal naval battery "Ile de Cézembre" in the Marine-Artillerie-Abteilung 608	15 August 1944	Awarded 577th Oak Leaves 2 September 1944	—
Rudolf Severloh	Heer	Leutnant	Leader of the 11./Grenadier-Regiment 17	25 January 1945	—	—
Otto Seyd	Heer	Hauptmann (Note: According to Scherzer as Hauptmann of the Reserves.)	Leader of the I./Grenadier-Regiment 407	5 March 1945*	Killed in action 21 February 1945	—
Walther von Seydlitz-Kurzbach+	Heer	Generalmajor	Commander of the 12. Infanterie-Division	15 August 1940	Awarded 54th Oak Leaves 31 December 1941	
Kurt Seyfahrt	Luftwaffe	Hauptmann	Staffelkapitän of the Stabsstaffel/Kampfgeschwader 2	5 September 1944	—	—
Fritz Seyffardt	Luftwaffe	Leutnant	Pilot in the 5./Schlachtgeschwader 2 "Immelmann" (Note: According to Scherzer as pilot in the II./Schlachtgeschwader 2 "Immelmann".)	8 August 1944	—	—
Paul Seyffardt	Heer	Oberst	Commander of Infanterie-Regiment 111	17 January 1942	—	—
Rudolf Seyrl	Heer	Hauptmann	Leader of the I./Panzergrenadier-Regiment 73	14 May 1944	—	—
Emil Sibbel	Heer	Oberfeldwebel	Zugführer (platoon leader) in the 5./Grenadier-Regiment 151	28 March 1945	—	—
Wolfgang Sichart von Sichartshofen	Heer	Major	Leader of Grenadier-Regiment 43	4 May 1944	—	—
Herbert Sichelschmidt	Heer	Major	Commander of Sturmgeschütz-Brigade 210	4 May 1944	—	—
Richard Siebenthaler	Heer	Oberfeldwebel	Zugführer (platoon leader) in the 6./Panzer-Regiment 2	14 April 1945	—	—
Bernhard Sieber	Heer	Oberst	Commander of Jäger-Regiment 228	24 June 1944	—	—
Horst Sieber	Heer	Leutnant	Leader of Jagdpanzer-Kompanie 1257	9 May 1945 (Note: According to Scherzer on 30 April 1945.)	—	—
Friedrich Sieberg	Heer	Oberstleutnant	Commander of Panzer-Regiment 10	16 June 1940	—	—
Franz Siebert	Heer	Oberfeldwebel	Zugführer (platoon leader) in the 3./Panzer-Jäger-Abteilung 306	9 July 1944	—	—
Friedrich Siebert	Heer	Generalleutnant	Commander of the 44. Infanterie-Division	18 November 1941	—	—
Bernhard Siebken	Waffen-SS	SS-Obersturmbannführer	Commander of the SS-Panzergrenadier-Regiment 2 "Leibstandarte SS Adolf Hitler"	17 April 1945	—	—
Rudolf Sieckenius	Heer	Oberstleutnant	Commander of Panzer-Regiment 2	17 September 1941	—	
Heinz Sieder	Kriegsmarine	Oberleutnant zur See	Commander of U-984	8 July 1944	—	—
Hans Siegel	Waffen-SS	SS-Hauptsturmführer	Chief of the 8./SS-Panzer-Regiment 12 "Hitlerjugend" (Note: According to Scherzer as chief of the 8./SS-Panzer-Regiment 12.)	23 August 1944	—	—
Rudolf Siegel	Heer	Oberstleutnant of the Reserves (Note: According to Scherzer as Oberstleutnant.)	Commander of Grenadier-Regiment 1084	14 February 1945	—	—
Robert Sieger	Heer	Feldwebel	Zugführer (platoon leader) in the 3./Infanterie-Regiment 133	14 December 1941	—	—
Wilhelm Siegert	Heer	Oberfeldwebel	Zugführer (platoon leader) in the Stabskompanie/Grenadier-Regiment 410	11 April 1944	—	—
Hans Siegler	Heer	Jäger	Machine gunner in the 5./Jäger-Regiment 49	12 August 1944	—	—
Peter Siegler	Luftwaffe	Feldwebel	Pilot in the 3./Jagdgeschwader 54	3 November 1942*	Killed in action 24 September 1942	—
Alfred Siegling	Waffen-SS	SS-Oberscharführer	Spähtruppführer (reconnaissance patrol leader) in the 1./SS-Panzer-Aufklärungs-Abteilung "Das Reich"	2 December 1943	—	—
Bernhard Siegmund	Heer	Oberleutnant	Chief of the 1./Grenadier-Regiment 7	14 April 1945	—	—
Joachim von Siegroth+	Heer	Oberst	Commander of a Kampfgruppe of the Fahnenjunker-Schule VI of the infantry Metz (Note: According to Scherzer as commander of an Alarmeinheit (emergency unit) Fahnenjunker-Schule VI/Kampfgruppe "Krause" (Divisions-Nr. 462).)	18 October 1944	Awarded (878th) Oak Leaves 9 May 1945? (Note: The Heerespersonalamt (HPA—Army Staff Office) received Joachim von Siegroth's nomination for the Oak Leaves from the commander-in-chief of the 9. Armee Theodor Busse via teleprinter message on 21 April 1945 announcing that a detailed statement with explanations will follow. This nomination went to the chief of the HPA in Berlin and to the Army Group Vistula. Major Joachim Domaschk noted on 28 April: "Waiting for announced statement!". The nomination list of the higher grade of the Knight's Cross of the Iron Cross with Oak Leaves notes the entry date of 19 March 1945. This is the date when the nomination was sent. An almost unreadable comment states "Waiting". According to Walther-Peer Fellgiebel a note claims "service proposal regarding immediate presentation pending". Scherzer does not confirm this entry but states that a comment "Waiting for announced statement" is noted instead. No further comments indicate that the nomination was further processed. According to the Association of Knight's Cross Recipients (AKCR) the award was presented in accordance with the Dönitz-decree. This is illegal according to the Deutsche Dienststelle (WASt) and lacks legal justification. The presentation number "876" was assigned by the AKCR. The presentation date was assigned by the Fellgiebel.)	
Kurt Sielemann	Heer	Unteroffizier	In the 2./Grenadier-Regiment 1129	14 April 1945	—	—
Ernst Sieler+	Heer	Oberst	Commander of Infanterie-Regiment 46	12 September 1941	Awarded 502nd Oak Leaves 24 June 1944	—
Bruno Sieling	Heer	Oberleutnant of the Reserves	Leader of the I./Grenadier-Regiment 401	5 March 1945	—	—
Friedrich Sierts	Heer	Oberst of the Reserves	Commander of Grenadier-Regiment 438	23 October 1944	—	—
Karl Sievers	Heer	Generalmajor	Commander of the 719. Infanterie-Division	18 November 1944	—	—
Walther Sievers+	Heer	Hauptmann of the Reserves	Commander of the III./Infanterie-Regiment 415	19 December 1942	Awarded 379th Oak Leaves 29 January 1944	—
Hans-Carl Sievert	Luftwaffe	Oberleutnant (Note: According to Scherzer as Oberleutnant zur See.)	Staffelkapitän of the 2./Kampfgeschwader 4 "General Wever"	30 December 1942	—	—
Curt Siewert	Heer	Generalmajor	Commander of the 58. Infanterie-Division	29 February 1944	—	—
Walter Sigel+	Luftwaffe	Hauptmann	Gruppenkommandeur of the I./Sturzkampfgeschwader 3 (Note: According to Scherzer as Gruppenkommandeur of the I./Sturzkampfgeschwader 76.)	21 July 1940	Awarded 116th Oak Leaves 2 September 1942	
Hermann Siggel+	Heer	Oberstleutnant	Commander of Grenadier-Regiment 172	9 June 1944	Awarded 552nd Oak Leaves 16 August 1944	—
Hans Sigmund	Waffen-SS	SS-Oberscharführer	Zugführer (platoon leader) in the 11./SS-Panzergrenadier-Regiment 9 "Germania"	5 April 1944	—	—
Rudolf Sigmund	Luftwaffe	Hauptmann	Staffelkapitän of the 11./Nachtjagdgeschwader 1 (Note: According to Scherzer as Staffelkapitän of the 10./Nachtjagdgeschwader 1.)	2 August 1943	—	—
Franz Silzner	Heer	Oberleutnant of the Reserves	Chief of the 11./Infanterie-Regiment 501	21 October 1942	—	—
Willy Simke	Waffen-SS	SS-Hauptscharführer	Zugführer (platoon leader) in the 5./SS-Panzer-Regiment "Das Reich"	16 December 1943	—	—
Alfred Simm+	Heer	Stabsfeldwebel	Zugführer (platoon leader) in the 2./Infanterie-Regiment 31	27 July 1941	Awarded 832nd Oak Leaves 14 April 1945	—
Herbert Simon	Heer	Oberstleutnant	Commander of Schützen-Regiment 112	24 July 1941	—	—
Klaus Simon	Heer	Hauptmann zur Verwendung (for disposition)	Commander of the I./Grenadier-Regiment 89	23 February 1944	—	—
Ludwig Simon	Heer	Leutnant of the Reserves	Leader of the 2./Panzergrenadier-Regiment 35	5 March 1945	—	—
Max Simon+	Waffen-SS	SS-Oberführer	Commander of SS-"Totenkopf"-Infanterie-Regiment 1	20 October 1941	Awarded 639th Oak Leaves 28 October 1944	A man wearing a military uniform, side cap and glasses.
Dr. phil. habil. Max Simoneit	Heer	Hauptmann of the Reserves	Chief of Stabskompanie/Grenadier-Regiment 919	23 June 1944	—	—
Arnold Simons	Heer	Major	Leader of Infanterie-Regiment 190	4 March 1942	—	—
[Dr.] Gerhard Simons+ (Note: The brackets around the doctor title [Dr.] denote that the academic title was attained after the Knight's Cross of the Iron Cross was awarded.)	Heer	Oberleutnant of the Reserves	Zugführer (platoon leader) in the Regiments-Nachrichten-Zug/Artillerie-Regiment 240 (Note: According to Scherzer as Zugführer (platoon leader) in the Nachrichten-Zug/Artillerie-Regiment 240.)	29 February 1944	Awarded 547th Oak Leaves 11 August 1944	—
Siegfried Simsch	Luftwaffe	Oberleutnant	Staffelkapitän of the 5./Jagdgeschwader 52	1 July 1942	—	—
Herbert Singer? (Note: Herbert Singer's nomination by his unit was received by the Heerespersonalamt (HPA—Army Staff Office) on 4 March 1945. This nomination no longer exists. According to the file card, it was rejected on 10 March 1945. There is no evidence of a second nomination by his unit for a later deed, or a direct presentation via the empowered Armeeoberkommando Ostpreußen. The claim that he received the Knight's Cross, as well as the Close Combat Clasp in Gold and the Honour Roll Clasp of the Army, which apparently resulted from the rejected first Knight's Cross nomination, is based on Singer's testimony and is not verifiable in the German Federal Archives. The presentation date is either Singer's claim or based on the assumption of the Association of Knight's Cross Recipients (AKCR). Singer was a member of the AKCR.)	Heer	Hauptmann	Commander of the II./Füsilier-Regiment 22	5 May 1945	—	—
Helmut Sinn	Luftwaffe	Oberleutnant	Observer in the 2.(F)/Aufklärungs-Gruppe 22 (Note: According to Scherzer as an observer in the Aufklärungsstaffel 2.(F)/22.)	31 December 1943	—	—
Johann Sinnhuber	Heer	Generalleutnant	Commander of the 28. Infanterie-Division	5 July 1941	—	—
Helmut Sinning	Heer	Feldwebel	Zugführer (platoon leader) in the 6./Grenadier-Regiment 181	15 March 1944	—	—
Klaus Sinram	Heer	Major	Leader of Grenadier-Regiment 309	23 October 1944	—	—
Rudolf Sintzenich	Heer	Generalmajor	Commander of the 33. Infanterie-Division	15 August 1940	—	—
Adolf Sinzinger	Heer	Oberst	Commander of Infanterie-Regiment 257	9 February 1942	—	—
Maximilian Siry	Heer	Generalmajor	Commander of the 246. Infanterie-Division	13 June 1942	—	A man wearing a side cap, military uniform with an Iron Cross displayed at the front of his uniform collar.
Wilhelm Sitt	Volkssturm	Sprengmeister der Polizei (Bomb disposal of the Police—rank equivalent to Feldwebel. The Volkssturm battalion commander rank equivalent to Major.)	Battalion leader in the Volkssturm Köln (Note: According to Scherzer as leader of a battalion of the Volkssturm in Köln and Abschnittsleiter (voluntary) in the Gau-organization office of the NSDAP-Gauleitung Köln-Aachen.)	7 February 1945	—	—
Günther Sitter	Waffen-SS	SS-Hauptsturmführer	Leader of the II./SS-Panzergrenadier-Regiment 10 "Westland" (Note: According to Scherzer on 13 September 1943 as leader of the II./SS-Panzergrenadier-Regiment "Westland".)	12 September 1943	—	—
Karl von Sivers	Heer	Major	Commander of the I./Panzer-Regiment 15	6 March 1944	—	—
Walter Six	Heer	Feldwebel	Zugführer (platoon leader) in the 4.(MG)/Panzergrenadier-Regiment 12 (Note: According to Scherzer as Zugführer (platoon leader) in the 4./Panzergrenadier-Regiment 12.)	5 April 1944*	Killed in action 20 December 1943	—
Friedrich Sixt+	Heer	Generalleutnant	Commander of the 50. Infanterie-Division	17 December 1943	Awarded 772nd Oak Leaves 11 March 1945	—
Hans-Heinrich Sixt von Armin	Heer	Generalleutnant	Commander of the 95. Infanterie-Division	22 September 1941	—	—
Wolfgang Skorczewski	Luftwaffe	Oberleutnant	Staffelkapitän in the I./Kampfgeschwader 27 "Boelcke"	17 September 1941	—	—
Dipl-Ing. Otto Skorzeny+	Waffen-SS	SS-Hauptsturmführer of the Reserves	Commander of Sonderverband z.b.V. Friedenthal	13 September 1943	Awarded 826th Oak Leaves 9 April 1945	A man in semi profile wearing a military uniform, steel helmet and a neck order in the shape of a cross.
Eduard Skrzipek+	Luftwaffe	Oberleutnant	Pilot in the 5./Kampfgeschwader 27 "Boelcke"	16 April 1943	Awarded 509th Oak Leaves 24 June 1944	—
Karl Smidt	Kriegsmarine	Kapitän zur See	Commander of destroyer Z27	15 June 1943	—	—
Rudolf Smola	Luftwaffe	Oberleutnant	Staffelführer of the 5./Schlachtgeschwader 2 "Immelmann" (Note: According to Scherzer as Staffelführer in the II./Schlachtgeschwader 2 "Immelmann".)	27 July 1944	—	—
Rudolf Smollich	Heer	Oberleutnant	Leader of Divisions-Füsilier-Bataillon 168 (Note: According to Scherzer as leader of Divisions-Füsilier-Bataillon 168 (A.A.).)	16 November 1944	—	—
Hubert Sniers	Luftwaffe	Leutnant	Leader of the 9./Fallschirmjäger-Regiment 15 (Note: According to Scherzer as leader of the III./Fallschirmjäger-Regiment 15.)	24 October 1944	—	—
August Snoek	Heer	Oberleutnant of the Reserves	Deputy leader of Panzer-Pionier-Bataillon 209 (Note: According to Scherzer as leader of Panzer-Pionier-Bataillon 209.)	5 November 1944*	Killed in accident 6 October 1944	—
Paul Sobotta	Heer	Leutnant of the Reserves	Leader of the 9./Grenadier-Regiment 110	26 June 1944	—	—
Kurt Sochatzy	Luftwaffe	Oberleutnant	Staffelkapitän of the 7./Jagdgeschwader 3	12 August 1941	—	
Erich Socke	Heer	Oberfeldwebel	Zugführer (platoon leader) in the 2./Panzer-Regiment 36	5 November 1944	—	—
Ralf Sodan	Heer	Oberst	Commander of Infanterie-Regiment 338	16 June 1940	—	—
Georg von Sodenstern	Heer	Generalleutnant	Chief of the General Staff of Heeresgruppe A	19 July 1940	—	—
Fritz Söchting	Heer	Gefreiter	Richtschütze (gunner) in the 3./Schnelle Abteilung 329	16 April 1943	—	—
August Söhlke	Heer	Oberfeldwebel	Leader of the 3./Grenadier-Regiment 211	14 April 1945	—	—
Willi Sölter	Luftwaffe	Hauptmann	Gruppenkommandeur of the I./Kampfgeschwader 77	9 August 1944 (Note: According to Scherzer on 19 August 1944.)	—	—
Wilhelm Söth	Heer	Hauptmann	Commander of the II./Artillerie-Regiment 56	28 November 1940	—	—
Gustav Soldner	Heer	Oberleutnant of the Reserves	Chief of the 1./Panzergrenadier-Regiment 66	18 July 1944	—	—
Clemens Sommer	Heer	Major	Commander of the II./Panzergrenadier-Regiment "Großdeutschland"	18 January 1945	—	—
Gerhard Sommer	Luftwaffe	Hauptmann	Staffelkapitän of the 4./Jagdgeschwader 11	27 July 1944*	Killed in action 12 May 1944	—
Joachim Sommer	Luftwaffe	Hauptmann	Staffelkapitän of the 4.(H)/Aufklärungs-Gruppe 31 (Note: According to Scherzer as Staffelkapitän of the Nahaufklärungsstaffel 4.(H)/31.)	25 November 1944	—	—
Ruprecht Sommer	Heer	Major	Commander of the I./Panzergrenadier-Regiment "Führer-Grenadier-Division" (Note: According to Scherzer as commander of the I./Panzergrenadier-Regiment 99.)	5 April 1945	—	—
Heinrich Sonne	Waffen-SS	SS-Obersturmführer of the Reserves	Chief of the Kradschützen-Kompanie/1. SS-Infanterie-Brigade (motorized) (Note: According to Scherzer in the SS-Kradschützen-Kompanie/1. SS-Infanterie-Brigade (motorized) "Reichsführer SS".)	10 December 1943	—	—
Christian Sonntag+	Heer	Major	Leader of Divisions-Gruppe 255	12 February 1944	Awarded 573rd Oak Leaves 5 September 1944	—
Ernst Sonntag	Heer	Oberst	Commander of Jäger-Regiment 749	17 April 1945	—	—
Eugen Sonntag	Heer	Hauptmann	Commander of the I./Grenadier-Regiment 117	9 December 1944	—	—
Karl-Heinrich Sonntag	Heer	Oberleutnant of the Reserves	Leader of the I./schwere Kavallerie-Abteilung 4 (motorized)	4 October 1944	—	—
Paul Sonntag	Heer	Leutnant of the Reserves	Zugführer (platoon leader) in Panzer-Regiment 27	19 January 1943	—	—
Ernst Sorge	Luftwaffe	Hauptmann	Pilot in the 1.(F)/Aufklärungs-Gruppe 124 (Kette Lappland) (Note: According to Scherzer as pilot in the Aufklärungsstaffel 1.(F)/124 (Kette Lappland).)	26 March 1944	—	—
Karl-Heinz Sorge	Heer	Oberleutnant	Chief of the 5./Panzer-Regiment 6	7 February 1944	—	—
August Sorko	Heer	Oberstleutnant	Commander of the II./Gebirgsjäger-Regiment 137	20 June 1940	—	—
Bernhard Sowada	Heer	Leutnant of the Reserves	Zugführer (platoon leader) in the 1./Sturmgeschütz-Abteilung 237	12 October 1943	—	—
Heinz Soyka	Heer	Oberleutnant	Chief of the 2./Grenadier-Regiment 96	13 January 1944	—	—
[Dr.] Hubert Spadiut	Luftwaffe	Oberleutnant	Staffelkapitän of the 5./Kampfgeschwader 76	26 March 1944	—	—
Wolfgang Späte+	Luftwaffe	Oberleutnant (Note: According to Scherzer as Oberleutnant of the Reserves.)	Pilot in the 5./Jagdgeschwader 54	5 October 1941	Awarded 90th Oak Leaves 23 April 1942	—
Helmuth Spaeter	Heer	Rittmeister	Chief of the 2./Panzer-Aufklärungs-Abteilung "Großdeutschland"	28 July 1943	—	—
[Dr.] Heinz Späthe	Heer	Leutnant of the Reserves	Leader of the 8./Panzer-Regiment 26	20 October 1944	—	—
Hermann Spandau	Heer	Hauptmann of the Reserves	Commander of the I./Grenadier-Regiment 396	9 September 1942	—	—
Hans-Christoph Freiherr von Spangenberg	Heer	Oberstleutnant of the Reserves	Commander of Grenadier-Regiment 203	22 January 1943	—	—
Heinz Sparbier	Heer	Oberleutnant of the Reserves	Leader of the 9./Infanterie-Regiment 6	17 December 1942	—	—
Julius Spari	Heer	Stabsfeldwebel	Zugführer (platoon leader) in the 7./Gebirgsjäger-Regiment 138	10 September 1944	—	—
Günther Specht	Luftwaffe	Major	Gruppenkommandeur of the II./Jagdgeschwader 11	8 April 1944	—	
Karl-Wilhelm Specht+	Heer	Oberst	Commander of Infanterie-Regiment 55	8 September 1941	Awarded 60th Oak Leaves 16 January 1942	
Wilhelm Specht	Heer	Oberleutnant	Chief of the 7./Infanterie-Regiment 62	27 July 1941	—	—
Hermann Ritter von Speck	Heer	Generalleutnant	Commanding general of the XVIII. Armeekorps (Note: According to Scherzer as leader of the XVIII. Armeekorps.)	17 October 1940*	Killed in action 15 June 1940	
Helmut Speckenheier	Heer	Oberleutnant	Leader of the 3./Heeres-Flak-Abteilung 312 (Note: According to Scherzer as leader of the 3./Heeres-Flak-Artillerie-Abteilung 312.)	7 October 1942	—	—
Hans Speckter	Heer	Oberleutnant	Chief of the 4./schwere Panzer-Jäger-Abteilung 563 (Note: According to Scherzer as chief of the 4./Panzer-Jäger-Abteilung 563.)	9 April 1944*	Killed in action 31 March 1944	—
Paul Speich	Heer	Unteroffizier	Group leader in the 1./Pionier-Bataillon 162	18 November 1941	—	—
[Prof.] Dr. phil. Hans Speidel (Note: The brackets around the professor [Prof.] denotes that the academic title was attained after the Knight's Cross of the Iron Cross was awarded.)	Heer	Generalleutnant	Chief of the General Staff of the 8. Armee	1 April 1944	—	a man in semi profile wearing a military uniform and glasses.
Kurt Speidel	Heer	Oberleutnant	Leader of the 2./Panzer-Pionier-Bataillon 86	22 September 1941	—	—
Fritz Spengler? (Note: Fritz Spengler's teleprinter nomination by his unit was received by the Heerespersonalamt (HPA—Army Staff Office) on 12 May 1945 at 13:45 and listed with the sequential Nr. 5198 in the book "Verliehene Ritterkreuze" (Awarded Knight Crosses). It was approved the very same day by General Ernst Maisel and backdated with a presentation date 6 May 1945. Major Joachim Domaschk called the Heeresgruppe C and informed Hauptmann Hofer. This was an unlawful presentation since it was nominated, processed an approved after the German surrender.)	Heer	Hauptmann	Commander of the I./Grenadier-Regiment 289	6 May 1945*	Killed in action 30 April 1945	—
Rudolf Sperl	Heer	Generalleutnant	Commander of the 61. Infanterie-Division	10 February 1945	—	—
Max Sperling	Heer	Oberstleutnant	Commander of Panzergrenadier-Regiment 11	6 April 1944	—	—
Hugo Sperrle	Luftwaffe	General der Flieger	Chief of Luftflotte 3 (Note: According to Scherzer as chief of Luftflotte 3 and commander West.)	17 May 1940	—	Black-and-white portrait of a man in semi profile wearing a military uniform, a monocle and an Iron Cross at his neck, his hair is combed back.
Hans Speth	Heer	Generalleutnant	Commander of the 28. Jäger-Division	23 February 1944	—	—
Edmund Spiegel	Heer	Major	Commander of the I./Grenadier-Regiment 544	8 August 1944	—	—
Joachim Spiegel	Heer	Hauptmann	Commander of the I./Grenadier-Regiment 4	19 January 1943	—	—
Wendelin Spiegel	Heer	Hauptmann of the Reserves	Commander of the I./Grenadier-Regiment 279	28 February 1945	—	—
Johannes Spielmann+	Heer	Oberleutnant	Zugführer (platoon leader) in the 1./Sturmgeschütz-Abteilung 197	27 March 1942	Awarded 804th Oak Leaves 28 March 1945	—
Paul Spier	Heer	Major	Commander of Panzer-Jäger-Abteilung 299	10 September 1944	—	—
Wilhelm Spies+	Luftwaffe	Hauptmann	Staffelkapitän of the 1./Zerstörergeschwader 26 "Horst Wessel"	14 June 1941	Awarded 85th Oak Leaves 5 April 1942	—
Jakob Spieß	Heer	Leutnant of the Reserves	Squadron leader in Kavallerie-Regiment 5 "Generalfeldmarschall von Mackensen" (Note: According to Scherzer as squadron leader in Kavallerie-Regiment 5.)	15 August 1944*	Died of wounds 8 August 1944	—
Albert Spieth	Luftwaffe	Oberfeldwebel	Pilot in the 3./Kampfgeschwader 51	24 March 1943	—	—
Armin Spiethoff	Heer	Oberst	Commander of Grenadier-Regiment 442	5 March 1945	—	—
Ludwig Spindler	Waffen-SS	SS-Sturmbannführer	Commander of the I./SS-Panzer-Artillerie-Regiment 9 "Hohenstaufen" (Note: According to Scherzer as commander of the I./SS-Panzer-Artillerie-Regiment 9.)	27 September 1944	—	—
Werner Spindler	Luftwaffe	Oberfeldwebel	Observer in the 2.(H)/Aufklärungs-Gruppe 3 (Note: According to Scherzr as bserver in the 2./Nahaufklärungsgruppe 3.)	30 September 1944	—	—
Wilhelm Spindler+	Heer	Leutnant	Zugführer (platoon leader) of the 13./Gebirgsjäger-Regiment 98	21 December 1940	Awarded 718th Oak Leaves 31 January 1945	—
Friedrich Spitäller	Heer	Major of the Reserves zur Verwendung (for disposition)	Commander of Jäger-Bataillon 8	25 July 1943	—	—
Robert Spitzer	Heer	Oberleutnant	Chief of the 2./Panzer-Jäger-Abteilung 1541	5 April 1945	—	—
Richard Spörle	Waffen-SS	SS-Hauptsturmführer of the Reserves	Leader of the II./SS-Freiwilligen-Panzergrenadier-Regiment "Norge" (Note: According to Scherzer as leader of the II./SS-Panzergrenadier-Regiment "Norge" (Norwegian Nr. 1).)	16 November 1944	—	—
Hans Graf von Sponeck	Heer	Generalleutnant	Commander of the 22. Infanterie-Division	14 May 1940	—	
Theodor Graf von Sponeck	Heer	Oberst	Commander of Schützen-Regiment 11	12 September 1941	—	—
Otto Sponheimer	Heer	Generalleutnant	Commander of the 21. Infanterie-Division	8 August 1941	—	—
Casper Sporck	Waffen-SS	SS-Unterscharführer	Geschützführer (gun layer) in the 5./SS-Freiwilligen-Panzer-Aufklärungs-Abteilung 11 "Nordland" (Note: According to Scherzer as Geschützführer (gun layer) in the 5./SS-Panzer-Aufklärungs-Abteilung 11.)	23 October 1944	—	—
Alfred Spott	Heer	Oberleutnant	Chief of the 8.(MG)/Grenadier-Regiment 1124 (Note: According to Scherzer as chief of the 8./Grenadier-Regiment 1124.)	5 March 1945*	Killed in action 14 February 1945	—
Max Sprang	Heer	Major	Commander of Divisions Kampfschule 349	9 December 1944	—	—
[Prof. Dr.] Bodo Spranz+ (Note: The brackets around the professor and doctor title [Prof. Dr.] denotes that the academic title was attained after the Knight's Cross of the Iron Cross was awarded.)	Heer	Oberleutnant	Chief of the 1./Sturmgeschütz-Abteilung 237	3 October 1943	Awarded 308th Oak Leaves 3 October 1943	—
Karl Spreitzer	Luftwaffe	Leutnant	Pilot in the 10.(Panzer)/Schlachtgeschwader 2 "Immelmann"	1 April 1945	—	—
Alfred Sprengel	Heer	Oberfeldwebel	Zugführer (platoon leader) in the 5./Grenadier-Regiment 405	26 March 1944	—	—
Willy Spreu	Heer	Major of the Reserves	Leader of Panzergrenadier-Regiment 192	24 February 1945	—	—
Gustav Sprick	Luftwaffe	Leutnant	Pilot in the 8./Jagdgeschwader 26 "Schlageter" (Note: According to Scherzer as pilot in the III./Jagdgeschwader 26 "Schlageter".)	1 October 1940	—	
Gustav Springer	Heer	Feldwebel	Zugführer (platoon leader) in the 2./Panzer-Jäger-Abteilung 253	30 April 1945	—	—
Heinrich Springer	Waffen-SS	SS-Hauptsturmführer	Leader of the 3./SS-Infanterie-Regiment (motorized) "Leibstandarte SS Adolf Hitler" (Note: According to Scherzer as leader of the 3./"Leibstandarte SS Adolf Hitler".)	12 January 1942	—	—
Josef Springmann	Heer	Oberjäger	Group leader in the 11./Jäger-Regiment 229	5 April 1945	—	—
Helmuth Sprung	Luftwaffe	Leutnant	Pilot in the 7./Kampfgeschwader 1 "Hindenburg" (Note: According to Scherzer as pilot in the III./Kampfgeschwader 1 "Hindenburg".)	12 November 1943	—	—
August Staar	Heer	Leutnant	Leader of the 4.(MG)/Grenadier-Regiment 112 (Note: According to Scherzer as leader of the 4./Grenadier-Regiment 112.)	22 August 1943	—	—
Georg Staats	Kriegsmarine	Kapitänleutnant	Commander of U-508	14 July 1943	—	—
Erich Staba	Heer	Leutnant	Leader of the 1./Feld-Ersatz-Abteilung 89	21 September 1944	—	—
Erich Stach	Heer	Oberleutnant of the Reserves	Leader of the I./Grenadier-Regiment 149	9 January 1945	—	—
Hermann Stachelhaus	Heer	Oberleutnant	Company leader in the I./Panzergrenadier-Regiment 103 (Note: According to Scherzer as company leader in the I./Panzergrenadier-Regiment 146.)	4 May 1944	—	—
Waldemar Stadermann	Luftwaffe	Leutnant	Pilot in the 6./Kampfgeschwader 77	12 November 1941	—	—
Sylvester Stadler+	Waffen-SS	SS-Sturmbannführer	Commander of the II./SS-Panzergrenadier-Regiment "Der Führer"	6 April 1943	Awarded 303rd Oak Leaves 16 September 1943 (152nd) Swords 6 May 1945? (Note: No evidence of the award can be found in the German Federal Archives, also not mentioned by the order commission of the Association of Knight's Cross Recipients (AKCR). According to Walther-Peer Fellgiebel, the award was presented by SS-Oberstgruppenführer Sepp Dietrich, which would make it an unlawful presentation. Fellgiebel is referring to H. Buch and W. Kment as sources. Buch reported on 25 June 2004 that he had not had anything to do with this case. Stadler himself claimed that Dietrich proposed him on 22 March 1945, even though the 9. SS-Panzer-Division "Hohenstaufen" was not subordinated to the 6. SS-Panzerarmee. The sequential number "152" was assigned by the AKCR. The date might have been taken from Ernst-Günther Krätschmer.)	A black-and-white photograph of a man wearing a military uniform with fur collar, side cap and a neck order in shape of an Iron Cross. His cap has an emblem in shape of a human skull and crossed bones.
Helmut Staedke	Heer	Oberst im Generalstab (in the General Staff)	Chief of the general staff of the XXXV. Armeekorps	14 August 1943	—	—
Wilhelm Stähler+	Luftwaffe	Leutnant	Staffelführer of the 7./Schlachtgeschwader 2 "Immelmann"	20 July 1944	Awarded 812th Oak Leaves 28 March 1945	—
Ernst Stäudle	Waffen-SS	SS-Oberscharführer of the Reserves (Note: According to Scherzer as SS-Oberscharführer.)	Vorgeschobener Beobachter (forward observer) in the 8./SS-Artillerie-Regiment "Totenkopf"	10 April 1942	—	—
Reiner Stahel+	Luftwaffe	Oberstleutnant	Commander of Flak-Regiment 99 (motorized) (Note: According to Scherzer as commander of Flak-Regiment 34.)	18 January 1942	Awarded 169th Oak Leaves 4 January 1943; 79th Swords 18 July 1944	
Erhard Stahl	Luftwaffe	Oberfeldwebel	Pilot in the 3.(K)/Lehrgeschwader 1	16 April 1942*	Killed in action 22 March 1942	—
Hendrik Stahl+	Luftwaffe	Leutnant	Pilot in the 8./Sturzkampfgeschwader 2 "Immelmann" (Note: According to Scherzer as pilot in the III./Sturzkampfgeschwader 2 "Immelmann".)	23 December 1942	Awarded 506th Oak Leaves 24 June 1944	—
Dr.-jur. Paul Stahl+	Heer	Major of the Reserves	Leader of Panzergrenadier-Regiment 114	4 May 1944	Awarded (879th) Oak Leaves 9 May 1945? (Note: The Heerespersonalamt (HPA—Army Staff Office) received Dr.-jur. Paul Stahl's nomination for the Oak Leaves with the approval of the II. SS-Panzerkorps via letter on 12 April 1945. The HPA then again received the nomination, this time as a teleprinter message, together with the approval of Army Group South with the comment: "Waiting for statement of the 6. Armee, will be handed in later. Supreme command Army Group South". Major Joachim Domaschk noted: "Waiting for Panzer AOK Armee-Oberkommando 6 statement!". No further comments regarding the presentation or work in progress have been noted. Stahl is not listed on the nomination list of the higher grade of the Knight's Cross of the Iron Cross with Oak Leaves nor in the nomination book for Knight's Cross (starting with Nr. 5100). The Order Commission of the Association of Knight's Cross Recipients (AKCR) processed this case in 1975 and decided: "879th Oak Leaves, 9 May 1945". According to the AKCR the award was presented in accordance with the Dönitz-decree. This is illegal according to the Deutsche Dienststelle (WASt) and lacks legal justification. The presentation number "879" was assigned by the AKCR. The presentation date was assigned by the Walther-Peer Fellgiebel. Stahl was a member of the AKCR.)	—
Wilhelm Stahlmann	Heer	Feldwebel	Zugführer (platoon leader) in the 8./Grenadier-Regiment 497	16 March 1944*	Killed in action 29 February 1944	—
Hans-Arnold Stahlschmidt+	Luftwaffe	Leutnant	Staffelführer of the 2./Jagdgeschwader 27	20 August 1942	Awarded 365th Oak Leaves 3 January 1944	—
Karl-Heinz Stahnke	Luftwaffe	Oberleutnant	Staffelkapitän of the 3./Kampfgeschwader 40 (Note: According to Scherzer on 24 October 1944 as pilot in the 3./Kampfgeschwader 40.)	20 October 1944	—	—
Friedrich Staiger	Heer	Major	Commander of the I./Grenadier-Regiment 185	23 August 1944	—	—
Hermann Staiger	Luftwaffe	Oberleutnant	Staffelkapitän of the 7./Jagdgeschwader 51	16 July 1941	—	
Dr. phil. Heinz Stamer	Kriegsmarine	Korvettenkapitän zur Verwendung (for disposition)	Chief of the 8. Vorpostenflottille	20 April 1945	—	—
Reinhold Stammerjohann	Heer	Oberst	Commander of Panzergrenadier-Regiment 76	14 April 1945	—	—
Gerhard Stamp	Luftwaffe	Oberleutnant	Pilot in the 1.(K)/Lehrgeschwader 1	24 March 1943	—	—
Otto Stampfer	Heer	Hauptmann	Deputy leader of the III./Gebirgsjäger-Regiment 136 (Note: According to Scherzer as leader of the III./Gebirgsjäger-Regiment 136.)	23 July 1942	—	—
Otto Stams	Luftwaffe	Hauptmann	Gruppenkommandeur of the II./Kampfgeschwader 1 "Hindenburg"	1 August 1941	—	—
Friedrich Stannek	Luftwaffe	Fahnenjunker-Oberfeldwebel	Observer in the 4.(H)/Aufklärungs-Gruppe 12 (Note: According to Scherzer as observer in the Aufklärungsstaffel 4.(H)/12.)	12 November 1943	—	—
Otto Stapf	Heer	Generalleutnant	Commander of the 111. Infanterie-Division	31 August 1941	—	—
Wilhelm von Starck	Heer	Hauptmann of the Reserves	Leader of the I./Artillerie-Regiment 1553	23 October 1944	—	—
Heinrich Starke	Luftwaffe	Leutnant	Pilot in the 6./Schlachtgeschwader 10 (Note: According to Scherzer as Staffelführer of the 6./Schlachtgeschwader 10.)	28 January 1945	—	—
Matthias Starl? (Note: Matthias Starl's nomination by his unit, according to the file card, was received by the Heerespersonalamt P 5 (HPA—Army Staff Office) on 26 February 1945. It was rejected on 1 March 1945 and Starl was recommended for an honourable mention in the Honour Roll of the Army instead. Starl was mentioned on the 25 March 1945. A further nomination for the Knight's Cross is not verifiable. According to Walther-Peer Fellgiebel the presentation was made on 1 June 1945 by the Armee-Oberkommando 6, which was not authorized.)	Heer	Hauptmann	Commander of the I./Gebirgsjäger-Regiment 98	1 June 1945	—	—
Otto Starosta	Heer	Oberfeldwebel	Zugführer (platoon leader) in the 1./Grenadier-Regiment 686	8 May 1943	—	—
Heribert Stather	Heer	Major	Leader of Grenadier-Regiment 482	8 August 1943	—	—
Alfred Staubach	Heer	Unteroffizier	Group leader in the 7./Grenadier-Regiment 697	27 August 1943	—	—
Franz Staudegger	Waffen-SS	SS-Unterscharführer	Panzer commander in the 13./SS-Panzer-Regiment "Leibstandarte SS Adolf Hitler"	10 July 1943	—	—
Paul Staufenbiehl	Heer	Oberleutnant	Chief of Stabskompanie/Jäger-Regiment 49	17 April 1945	—	—
Sven von Stauss	Heer	Hauptmann of the Reserves	Commander of the II./Panzergrenadier-Regiment 98	30 April 1945*	Died of wounds 23 April 1945	—
Ludwig Stautner	Heer	Major	Commander of the I./Gebirgsjäger-Regiment 139	20 June 1940	—	—
Hans Stechmann	Luftwaffe	Oberfeldwebel	Pilot in the 9./Jagdgeschwader 3	4 September 1941	—	
Albert Stecken	Luftwaffe	Major im Generalstab (in the General Staff)	Ia (operations officer) of the 8. Fallschirmjäger-Division	28 April 1945	—	—
Jakob Steckmeier	Heer	Leutnant	Leader of the 3./Grenadier-Regiment 485	9 April 1944	—	—
Ernst-Siegfried Steen	Luftwaffe	Hauptmann	Gruppenkommandeur of the III./Sturzkampfgeschwader 2 "Immelmann"	17 October 1941*	Killed in action 23 September 1941	—
Kurt Steenbock	Heer	Obergefreiter	Messenger squadron leader in the III./Grenadier-Regiment 53	14 May 1944	—	—
Konrad Steets	Luftwaffe	Gefreiter	Battalion messenger in the II./Fallschirm-Panzergrenadier-Regiment 2 "Hermann Göring" (Note: According to Scherzer as messenger in the Stab II./Fallschirm-Panzergrenadier-Regiment 2 "Hermann Göring".)	30 November 1944	—	—
Wilhelm Steffani	Heer	Gefreiter	Richtschütze (gunner) in the 13.(Infanteriegeschütz)/Grenadier-Regiment 948 (Note: According to Scherzer as Richtschütze (gunner) in the 13./Grenadier-Regiment 948.)	4 May 1944	—	—
Helmut Steffen	Luftwaffe	Oberfeldwebel	Pilot in the 5.(F)/Aufklärungs-Gruppe 122 (Note: According to Scherzer as pilot in the Aufklärungsstaffel 5.(F)/122.)	5 December 1943	—	—
Karl Steffen	Luftwaffe	Feldwebel	Pilot in the 9./Jagdgeschwader 52 (Note: According to Scherzer as pilot in the 8./Jagdgeschwader 52.)	1 July 1942	—	—
Walter Steffen	Heer	Hauptmann	Commander of Regiment Gruppe 510	4 July 1944	—	—
Fritz Steger	Heer	Leutnant of the Reserves	Zugführer (platoon leader) in Infanterie-Regiment 20 (motorized)	15 August 1940	—	—
Wilhelm Steger	Heer	Feldwebel	Zugführer (platoon leader) in the 6./Panzergrenadier-Regiment 10	20 April 1943	—	—
Martin Steglich+	Heer	Hauptmann	Leader of the II./Füsilier-Regiment 27 (Note: According to Scherzer as leader of the I./Füsilier-Regiment 27.)	25 January 1943	Awarded 816th Oak Leaves 5 April 1945	—
Karl Stegmann	Heer	Unteroffizier	Assistant observer in the 7./Artillerie-Regiment 198	20 January 1944*	Killed in action 6 November 1943	—
Rudolf Stegmann	Heer	Generalmajor	Commander of the 36. Infanterie-Division	20 January 1944	—	—
Werner Stehle	Luftwaffe	Leutnant	Zugführer (platoon leader) in the 3./Fallschirm-Sturmgeschütz-Brigade 12	28 April 1945	—	—
Konrad Steidl	Heer	Hauptmann of the Reserves	Deputy leader of the I./2. Jäger-Regiment "Brandenburg" (Note: According to Scherzer as leader of the I./2. Regiment "Brandenburg".)	26 January 1944	—	—
Luitpold Steidle	Heer	Oberstleutnant	Commander of Grenadier-Regiment 767	22 January 1943	—	
Eugen Steigelmann	Heer	Feldwebel	Zugführer (platoon leader) in the 8./Grenadier-Regiment 80	9 June 1944	—	—
Erich Stein	Heer	Oberleutnant of the Reserves	Leader of the II./Grenadier-Regiment 105	3 January 1944	—	—
Gerhard Stein	Heer	Hauptmann (Note: According to Scherzer as Hauptmann of the Reserves and leader of Divisions-Füsilier-Bataillon (A.A.) 30.)	Leader of Divisions-Füsilier-Bataillon 30	26 November 1944	—	—
Günther Stein	Luftwaffe	Feldwebel	Radio operator in the 6./Kampfgeschwader 2	26 March 1944	—	—
Walter Stein	Heer	Major	Commander of the III./Grenadier-Regiment 485	28 November 1943	—	—
Werner Stein	Luftwaffe	Feldwebel	Air gunner in the 1./Sturzkampfgeschwader 2 "Immelmann"	19 August 1943	—	—
Heinz-Eberhard Freiherr von Steinaecker	Luftwaffe	Leutnant (Note: According to Scherzer as Leutnant of the Reserves and leader of the 2./Flak-Regiment 61.)	Leader of the 2./Flak-Regiment 61 (motorized)	26 March 1944	—	—
Dr. phil. Heinz Steinbach	Heer	Leutnant of the Reserves	Zugführer (platoon leader) in the 3./Panzer-Pionier-Bataillon 19	27 September 1943*	Died of wounds 22 August 1943	—
Fritz Steinbacher	Heer	Hauptmann	Leader of the I./Artillerie-Regiment 172	21 February 1944	—	—
Leopold Steinbatz+	Luftwaffe	Feldwebel	Pilot in the 9./Jagdgeschwader 52	14 February 1942	Awarded 96th Oak Leaves 2 June 1942; 14th Swords 23 June 1942	
Eberhard Steinborn	Heer	Hauptmann of the Reserves	Leader of Panzer-Jäger-Abteilung 156	11 July 1944	—	—
Walter Steinbrenner	Heer	Hauptmann of the Reserves	Chief of the 7./Grenadier-Regiment 211	9 July 1944	—	—
Felix Steiner+	Waffen-SS	SS-Oberführer	Commander of SS-Infanterie-Regiment (motorized) "Deutschland" (Note: According to Scherzer as commander of SS-Standarte "Deutschland".)	15 August 1940	Awarded 159th Oak Leaves 23 December 1942; 86th Swords 10 August 1944	A man wearing a military uniform and neck order, in the shape of a cross. His hair is combed to the back.
Gerhard Steinert	Heer	Oberleutnant	Chief of the 9./Grenadier-Regiment 532	21 April 1944	—	—
Gerhard Steinführer	Heer	Oberfeldwebel	Zugführer (platoon leader) in the 2./Panzergrenadier-Regiment 394	8 May 1943	—	—
Dietrich Steinhardt	Heer	Oberleutnant	Chief of the 2./Infanterie-Regiment 51 (motorized) (Note: According to Scherzer as chief of the 2./Infanterie-Regiment 51.)	27 October 1939	—	—
Günter Steinhausen	Luftwaffe	Feldwebel	Pilot in the 1./Jagdgeschwader 27	3 November 1942	Missing in action 6 September 1942	—
Georg Steinhauser	Heer	Unteroffizier	Group leader in the 5./Grenadier-Regiment 316	31 January 1945	—	—
Georg Steinhoff	Heer	Oberfeldwebel	Deputy Zugführer (platoon leader) of the Pionierzug Stabskompanie I./Grenadier-Regiment 431 (Note: According to Scherzer as leader of the Pionierzug Stabskompanie I./Grenadier-Regiment 431.)	29 November 1944	—	—
Johannes Steinhoff+	Luftwaffe	Oberleutnant	Staffelkapitän of the 4./Jagdgeschwader 52	30 August 1941	Awarded 115th Oak Leaves 2 September 1942; 82nd Swords 28 July 1944	The head and shoulders of a man, shown in semi-profile. He wears a peaked cap and a military uniform with military decorations. His face is scared and his eyes are hidden behind glasses.
Paul Steinhorst	Heer	Oberleutnant	Chief of the 6./Grenadier-Regiment 410	20 October 1944*	Died of wounds 19 October 1944	—
Hans-Hermann Steinkamp	Luftwaffe	Oberleutnant	Staffelkapitän of the 14.(Panzer)/Schlachtgeschwader 9	24 October 1944	—	—
Erhard Steinke? (Note: The evidence presented by Erhard Steinke to the German Federal Archives was analyzed by the Landeskriminalamt Hesse. The advisory report issued in 1972 concluded that the documentation was not original. Steinke presented his evidence to the order commission of the Association of Knight's Cross Recipients (AKCR) nine years later, which was not aware of the preceding analysis of the Landeskriminalamt and concluded: "There remains no doubt..." Steinke was a member of the AKCR.)	Heer	Hauptmann	Battalion leader in the 129. Infanterie-Division	20 April 1945	—	—
Friedrich-Carl von Steinkeller	Heer	Oberstleutnant	Commander of Panzergrenadier-Regiment 7	31 March 1943	—	—
Herbert Steinkopf	Heer	Oberleutnant of the Reserves	Chief of the 3./Grenadier-Regiment 467	15 May 1944	—	—
Wilhelm Steinmann	Luftwaffe	Major of the Reserves	Gruppenkommandeur of the I./Jagdgeschwader 4	28 March 1945	—	—
Hans Steinwachs	Luftwaffe	Hauptmann (Note: According to Scherzer as Oberleutnant and Staffelkapitän in the II./Sturzkampfgeschwader 1.)	Staffelkapitän of the 4./Sturzkampfgeschwader 1	5 February 1944	—	—
Heinrich Steinwachs	Heer	Oberstleutnant zur Verwendung (for disposition)	Commander of Panzer-Artillerie-Regiment 116	15 April 1944	—	—
Walter Steinwachs	Heer	Oberleutnant	Adjutant of Grenadier-Regiment 432	30 April 1945*	Killed in action 23 March 1945	—
Josef Steiof	Heer	Major	Leader of Grenadier-Regiment 1096	22 October 1944	—	—
Wilhelm Stellmann	Luftwaffe	Obergefreiter	Richtkanonier (gunner) in the 5./Reserve-Flak-Abteilung 115	16 November 1942	—	—
Friedrich Stellwagen	Heer	Hauptmann	Commander of the II./Grenadier-Regiment 106	17 March 1945	—	—
Wilhelm Stemmermann+	Heer	General der Artillerie	Commanding general of the XI. Armeekorps	7 February 1944	Awarded 399th Oak Leaves 18 February 1944	
Wilhelm Stemmler	Luftwaffe	Major	Geschwaderkommodore of Kampfgeschwader 77	6 October 1944	—	—
Edgar Stentzler	Luftwaffe	Major	Commander of the II./Fallschirmjäger-Sturm-Regiment (Note: According to Scherzer as commander of the II./Fallschirmjäger-Sturm-Regiment 1.)	9 July 1941	—	—
Albert Stenwedel? (Note: No evidence of the award can be found in the German Federal Archives. Also no mentioned by the order commission of the Association of Knight's Cross Recipients (AKCR). According to von Seemen presumably awarded by general Maximilian de Angelis on the basis of the Dönitz-decree of 3 May 1945. Walther-Peer Fellgiebel noted: No justification for the award. Albert Stenwedel was a member of the AKCR.)	Waffen-SS	SS-Sturmbannführer	Commander of the II./Waffen-Gebirgsjäger-Regiment 27 der SS	3 May 1945	—	—
Heinrich Stenzel	Heer	Oberleutnant	Chief of the 2.(Radfahr)/Divisions-Aufklärungs-Abteilung 12 (Note: According to Scherzer as chief of the 2./Radfahr-Abteilung 12.)	22 December 1941	—	—
Herbert Stenzel	Heer	Hauptmann	Leader of the I./Panzergrenadier-Regiment 108	5 March 1945	—	—
Alois Stephan	Heer	Leutnant of the Reserves	Leader of the 1./Grenadier-Regiment 1084	10 February 1945	—	—
Eberhard Stephan	Heer	Major	Commander of Panzer-Aufklärungs-Abteilung 116	12 January 1945	—	—
Kurt Stephani	Luftwaffe	Major of the Reserves	Leader of Fallschirmjäger-Regiment 9 (Note: According to Scherzer as commander of Fallschirmjäger-Regiment 9.)	30 September 1944*	Died of wounds 20 August 1944	—
Hans-Karl Stepp+	Luftwaffe	Oberleutnant	Staffelkapitän of the 7./Sturzkampfgeschwader 2 "Immelmann"	4 February 1942	Awarded 462nd Oak Leaves 27 April 1944 (Note: According to Scherzer on 25 April 1944.)	—
Jürgen Steputat	Luftwaffe	Leutnant	Pilot in the Eprobungsstaffel (test squadron) I./Kampfgeschwader 30 (Note: According to Scherzer as pilot in the Eprobungsstaffel (test squadron) Kampfgeschwader 30.)	20 December 1941*	Killed in action 8 September 1941	—
Hans Stern	Heer	Hauptmann	Chief of the 3./Panzer-Regiment 11	15 July 1941	—	A man wearing a peaked cap, black military uniform with various military decorations.
Franz Reichsfreiherr von Sternbach	Heer	Hauptmann	Commander of the III./Grenadier-Regiment 688	12 November 1943	—	—
Heinrich Sterr	Luftwaffe	Oberfeldwebel	Pilot in the 6./Jagdgeschwader 54	5 December 1943	—	—
Günter Stettin	Heer	Major	Commander of Panzer-Pionier-Bataillon 92	24 January 1944	—	—
Walter Stettner Ritter von Grabenhofen	Heer	Oberst	Commander of the 1. Gebirgs-Division	23 April 1943	—	A man wearing a field cap and military uniform.
Fritz Steudel	Luftwaffe	Oberfeldwebel	Radio operator in the Stab II./Kampfgeschwader 53 "Legion Condor"	28 February 1945	—	—
Josef Steudel	Luftwaffe	Hauptmann	Staffelkapitän of the 8./Kampfgeschwader 2 (Note: According to Scherzer as Staffelkapitän in the III./Kampfgeschwader 2.)	29 October 1944	—	—
Dr. jur. Friedrich-Wilhelm Steuer	Heer	Major	Commander of the III./Panzergrenadier-Regiment 129	26 August 1943	—	—
Friedrich Stichtenoth	Heer	Oberstleutnant	Commander of Panzergrenadier-Regiment 128	5 September 1944	—	—
Otto Stiefelmayer	Heer	Oberleutnant	Chief of the 1./Panzer-Regiment 8	12 July 1942	—	—
Hermann Stiefvater	Heer	Major	Commander of Panzer-Jäger-Abteilung 173	18 May 1941	—	—
Rolf Stiegert	Heer	Hauptmann of the Reserves	Leader of the II./Grenadier-Regiment 316	16 January 1945	—	—
Johann Stiegler	Heer	Oberfeldwebel	Zugführer (platoon leader) in the Panzer-Jäger-Abteilung "Feldherrnhalle"	1 February 1945	—	—
Gottwald Stier	Heer	Unteroffizier of the Reserves (Note: According to Scherzer as Unteroffizier and Geschützführer (gun layer) in the 2./Sturmgeschütz-Abteilung 667.)	Geschützführer (gun layer) in the 1./Sturmgeschütz-Abteilung 667	13 August 1943	—	—
Dipl.-Ing. Paul Stier	Heer	Oberleutnant of the Reserves	Leader of the 2./Pionier-Bataillon 741	8 October 1942*	Killed in action 21 September 1942	—
Kurt Stifter	Luftwaffe	Leutnant	Pilot in the 9./Sturzkampfgeschwader 77 (Note: According to Scherzer as adjutant in the III./Sturzkampfgeschwader 77.)	22 January 1943*	Killed in action 21 December 1942	—
Josef Stigler	Heer	Oberleutnant of the Reserves	Leader of the II./Infanterie-Regiment 42	10 July 1942	—	—
Fritz Stillger	Heer	Leutnant	Leader of the 7./Grenadier-Regiment 1 (Note: According to Scherzer as leader of the 7./Panzergrenadier-Regiment 1.)	14 June 1943	—	—
Albert Stimmer	Heer	Oberfähnrich	Vorgeschobener Beobachter (forward observer) in Artillerie-Regiment 342	6 October 1944	—	—
[Prof. Dr.] Walter Stimpel	Luftwaffe	Oberleutnant	Staffelkapitän of the 6./Sturzkampfgeschwader 77	7 June 1942	—	—
Ernst Stock	Heer	Major	Leader of Grenadier-Regiment 849 (Note: According to Scherzer as commander of Grenadier-Regiment 849.)	12 November 1943	—	—
Hans-Christian Stock+	Heer	Leutnant	Zugführer (platoon leader) of the 2./Sturmgeschütz-Abteilung 270	22 August 1943	Awarded 628th Oak Leaves 23 October 1944	—
Wolfgang Stocker	Heer	Feldwebel	Zugführer (platoon leader) in the 6./Grenadier-Regiment 97	4 May 1944	—	—
Hans-Gerrit von Stockhausen	Kriegsmarine	Korvettenkapitän	Commander of U-65	14 January 1941	—	—
Otto Stodieck	Heer	Oberleutnant	Chief of the 5./Panzer-Regiment 1	31 January 1944*	Killed in action 24 December 1943	—
Herbert Stöckert	Heer	Gefreiter	Machine gun leader in the 9./Infanterie-Regiment 156 (motorized) (Note: According to Scherzer as rifle leader in the 9./Infanterie-Regiment (motorized) 156.)	10 October 1941*	Died of wounds 4 October 1941	—
Alois Stoeckl	Luftwaffe	Oberst	Geschwaderkommodore of Kampfgeschwader 55	4 July 1940	—	—
Helmut Stoecks	Heer	Unteroffizier	With the commander of Fester Platz Wilna (Note: According to Scherzer in the Stab/commander Fester Platz Wilna.)	20 July 1944	—	—
Helmut Störchel	Luftwaffe	Major (Note: According to Scherzer as Hauptmann.)	Gruppenkommandeur of the III./Kampfgeschwader 30	22 November 1943	—	—
Georg Störck+	Heer	Leutnant of the Reserves	Leader of the pioneer platoon in the Stabskompanie/Schützen-Regiment 394	22 September 1941	Awarded (880th) Oak Leaves 9 May 1945? (Note: The Heerespersonalamt (HPA—Army Staff Office) received Georg Störck's nomination for the Oak Leaves, which had been sent on 18 February 1945, via teleprinter message on 26 February 1945. Major Joachim Domaschk requested on 3 March via teleprinter message from the nominating Führer-Begleit Division a detailed statement regarding the actions leading to the nomination. This statement was received by the HPA via the Armee-Oberkommando 17 on 9 March. Major Domaschk approved this nomination on 10 March, indicating "Oak Leaves yes". Another nomination, bypassing the official command chain, was also submitted directly to the Führer's Adjutant of the Wehrmacht. This nomination was also submitted for official processing to the HPA on 11 March, where it arrived on 13 March. Domaschk then revoked his earlier decision and stated: "Insufficient explanatory statement, Requesting more details!". No further comments regarding the presentation or work in progress have been noted. The nomination list of the higher grade of the Knight's Cross of the Iron Cross with Oak Leaves indicates an entry date of 2 March 1945. Also noted is forwarding date of the Führer on 11 March. A presentation date is not stated. A comment indicating "Unfinished" was noted. Major Domasch apparently halted the approval process on 13 March and was waiting for further clarifying information. It appears that this information never arrived before the end of the war. The Order Commission of the Association of Knight's Cross Recipients (AKCR) processed this case in 1978 and decided: "Oak Leaves yes, 9 May 1945". According to the AKCR the award was presented in accordance with the Dönitz-decree. This is illegal according to the Deutsche Dienststelle (WASt) and lacks legal justification. The presentation number "880" was assigned by the AKCR. The presentation date was assigned by the Walther-Peer Fellgiebel. Störck was a member of the AKCR.)	—
Johannes Störl	Heer	Hauptmann of the Reserves	Chief of the 2./Artillerie-Regiment 156	10 September 1943	—	—
Arno Stoessel von der Heyde	Heer	Oberstleutnant	Commander of the I./Infanterie-Regiment 78	30 August 1942	—	—
Karl-Friedrich Stoewaß	Heer	Hauptmann of the Reserves	Chief of the 2./Panzer-Aufklärungs-Abteilung 14	14 April 1945	—	—
Arnold Stoffers	Waffen-SS	SS-Obersturmbannführer	Commander of SS-Freiwilligen-Panzergrenadier-Regiment 23 "Norge" (Note: According to Scherzer as commander of SS-Panzergrenadier-Regiment 23 "Norge" (Norwegian Nr. 1).)	12 March 1944*	Killed in action 25 February 1944	—
Horst Stoffleth	Heer	Oberleutnant	Company leader in the gemischte Aufklärungs-Abteilung 178 (Note: According to Scherzer as company leader in the Schnellen Abteilung 178.)	20 August 1942	—	—
Erich Stoffregen	Luftwaffe	Hauptmann	Gruppenkommandeur of the II./Kampfgeschwader 30	13 August 1942	—	—
Hans Stohwasser	Kriegsmarine	Konteradmiral	Befehlshaber der Sicherung der Ostsee	30 November 1940	—	—
Herman Stoll	Heer	Hauptmann	Commander of the II./Grenadier-Regiment 521	9 June 1944*	Killed in action 19 February 1944	—
Paul Stoll	Heer	Unteroffizier	Truppführer (troop leader) in the 7./Panzergrenadier-Regiment 128	2 September 1944	—	—
Egon Stoll-Berberich	Luftwaffe	Hauptmann of the Reserves (Note: According to Scherzer as Hauptmann.)	Staffelkapitän of the 7./Sturzkampfgeschwader 1	29 February 1944	—	—
Bruno Stolle	Luftwaffe	Hauptmann	Staffelkapitän of the 8./Jagdgeschwader 2 "Richthofen"	17 March 1943	—	—
Hans Stollnberger	Luftwaffe	Leutnant	Staffelführer of the 8./Schlachtgeschwader 1	14 October 1942	—	—
Anton Stolte	Heer	Oberfeldwebel	Zugführer (platoon leader) in the Stabskompanie/Grenadier-Regiment 943	19 August 1944	—	—
Johannes Stoltenburg	Heer	Oberst	Commander of Artillerie-Regiment 177	11 August 1944	—	—
Edwin Stolz+	Heer	Feldwebel	Zugführer (platoon leader) in the 14.(Panzerjäger)/Grenadier-Regiment 353 (Note: According to Scherzer as Zugführer (platoon leader) in the 14./Grenadier-Regiment 353.)	8 February 1943	Awarded 498th Oak Leaves 12 June 1944	—
Dipl.-Ing. Harald Stolz	Heer	Oberstleutnant	Commander of Kradschützen-Bataillon 43	28 August 1942	—	—
Josef Stolz	Heer	Leutnant	Zugführer (platoon leader) in the 10./Infanterie-Regiment 51 (motorized) (Note: According to Scherzer as Zugführer (platoon leader) in the 10./Infanterie-Regiment 51.)	27 October 1939	—	—
Joachim von Stolzmann	Heer	Oberstleutnant	Commander of the III./Infanterie-Regiment 17	29 September 1940	—	—
Erich Storek	Heer	Leutnant	Leader of the 8./Panzergrenadier-Regiment 108	5 April 1944	—	—
Walter Storp+	Luftwaffe	Hauptmann	Gruppenkommandeur of the II./Kampfgeschwader 76	21 October 1940	Awarded 22nd Oak Leaves 14 July 1941	—
Hans-Günther Stotten+	Heer	Leutnant	Leader of the 1./Panzer-Regiment 3	4 July 1940	Awarded 236th Oak Leaves 10 May 1943	—
Max Stotz+	Luftwaffe	Oberfeldwebel	Pilot in the 5./Jagdgeschwader 54	19 June 1942	Awarded 137th Oak Leaves 30 October 1942	—
Otto Stoy	Heer	Leutnant	Leader of the 3./Artillerie-Regiment 171	5 November 1944	—	—
[Dr.] Ernst Graf Strachwitz von Groß-Zauche und Camminetz	Heer	Hauptmann	Leader of the II./Gebirgsjäger-Regiment 137	26 November 1944	—	—
Hyazinth Graf Strachwitz von Gross-Zauche und Camminetz+	Heer	Major of the Reserves	Commander of the I./Panzer-Regiment 2	25 August 1941	Awarded 144th Oak Leaves 13 November 1942; 27th Swords 28 March 1943; 11th Diamonds 15 April 1944	A smiling man in uniform holding s sheaf of documents
Mauritz Freiherr von Strachwitz	Heer	Generalleutnant	Commander of the 87. Infanterie-Division	9 January 1945	—	—
Walter Stracke	Heer	Oberleutnant of the Reserves	Chief of the 2./Kradschützen-Bataillon 53	21 November 1942	—	—
Günther Straehler-Pohl	Luftwaffe	Hauptmann	Commander of the II./Fallschirmjäger-Regiment 3 (Note: According to Scherzer as commander of the I./Fallschirmjäger-Regiment 3.)	10 May 1943	—	—
Martin Strahammer+	Heer	Oberstleutnant	Commander of Panzer-Jäger-Abteilung 240	30 January 1942	Awarded 545th Oak Leaves 11 August 1944	—
Friedrich-Wilhelm Strakeljahn	Luftwaffe	Hauptmann	Staffelkapitän of the 14.(Jabo)/Jagdgeschwader 5	19 August 1943	—	—
Stefan Strapatin	Waffen-SS	SS-Rottenführer	Telecommunication troop leader in the II./(niederl.)SS-Freiwilligen-Panzergrenadier-Regiment 49 "De Ruyter" (Note: According to Scherzer as telecommunication troop leader in the II./SS-Freiwilligen-Panzergrenadier-Regiment 49 "De Ruiter" (niederl. Nr. 2).)	16 November 1944	—	—
Erwin Strasser	Heer	Oberleutnant	Leader of the 5./Panzer-Regiment 33	5 March 1945	—	—
Hubert Straßl	Luftwaffe	Oberfeldwebel	Pilot in the 8./Jagdgeschwader 51 "Mölders"	12 November 1943*	Killed in action 8 July 1943	—
Hannes Straßmair	Luftwaffe	Leutnant	Pilot in the 2.(F)/Aufklärungs-Gruppe 122	3 April 1943	—	—
Hinrich Stratemann	Heer	Hauptmann of the Reserves	Chief of the 8./Grenadier-Regiment 76 (motorized)	2 October 1943	—	—
Johann Straub	Heer	Leutnant	Zugführer (platoon leader) in Panzer-Jäger-Abteilung 7	12 August 1944	—	—
Erich Straube+	Heer	Generalmajor	Commander of the 268. Infanterie-Division	19 July 1940	Awarded 609th Oak Leaves 30 September 1944	—
Georg Straube	Heer	Oberfeldwebel	Zugführer (platoon leader) in the 2./Panzer-Jäger-Abteilung 18 (motorized) (Note: According to Scherzer as Zugführer (platoon leader) in the 2./Panzer-Jäger-Abteilung 18.)	2 June 1943	—	—
Adolf Strauß	Heer	General der Infanterie	Commanding general of the II. Armeekorps	27 October 1939	—	
Gustav Strauß	Heer	Oberfeldwebel (Note: According to Scherzer as Oberfeldwebel (Offiziersanwärter—officer candidate).)	Zugführer (platoon leader) in the 10./Infanterie-Regiment 267	25 October 1942	—	—
Hubert Strauß	Heer	Oberleutnant of the Reserves	Leader of the 9./Grenadier-Regiment 361 (motorized)	4 October 1944	—	—
Werner Streck	Heer	Hauptmann of the Reserves	Leader of Feldersatz-Bataillon 81	28 December 1943	—	—
Bruno Streckenbach+	Waffen-SS	SS-Brigadeführer and Generalmajor of the Waffen-SS (Note: According to Scherzer as SS-Brigadeführer and Generalmajor of the Waffen-SS, the Reserves, and commander of the 19. Waffen-Grenadier Division der Waffen-SS (lett. Nr. 2).)	Commander of the 19. Waffen-Grenadier-Division of the SS	27 August 1944	Awarded 701st Oak Leaves 16 January 1945	—
Karl Strecker	Heer	Generalleutnant	Commander of the 79. Infanterie-Division	26 October 1941	—	
Wolfgang Strecker	Heer	Oberstleutnant	Leader of Grenadier-Regiment 545	5 April 1945	—	—
Erwin Strehlau	Heer	Gefreiter	Group leader in the 2./Panzergrenadier-Regiment 5	9 June 1944	—	—
Werner Streib+	Luftwaffe	Oberleutnant	Staffelkapitän of the 2./Nachtjagdgeschwader 1	6 October 1940	Awarded 197th Oak Leaves 26 February 1943; 54th Swords 11 March 1944	—
Johannes Streich	Heer	Oberst	Commander of Panzer-Regiment 15	31 January 1941	—	A man wearing a peaked cap, military uniform with an Iron Cross displayed at the front of his uniform collar.
Otto Streich	Heer	Unteroffizier	Group leader in the 1./Grenadier-Regiment 187	28 March 1945	Missing in action 21 November 1944	—
Ludwig Streil	Heer	Oberstleutnant	Commander of Infanterie-Regiment 61	30 June 1941*	Killed in action 17 May 1940	—
Dipl.-Ing. Gerhard Streit	Heer	Major of the Reserves	Commander of Pionier-Brückenbau-Bataillon 646 (motorized) (Note: According to Scherzer as commander of Pionier-Brücken-Bataillon 646.)	9 June 1944	—	—
Karl Streit	Heer	Feldwebel	Zugführer (platoon leader) in the 11./Grenadier-Regiment 461	26 August 1943	—	—
Ludwig Streit	Heer	Oberleutnant of the Reserves	Leader of the 5./Artillerie-Regiment 114	10 September 1943	—	—
Werner Streit	Heer	Hauptmann	Chief of the 5./Grenadier-Regiment 51 (motorized)	14 April 1943	—	—
Hans Strelow+	Luftwaffe	Leutnant	Staffelführer of the 5./Jagdgeschwader 51 "Mölders"	18 March 1942	Awarded 84th Oak Leaves 24 March 1942	
Siegfried Strelow	Kriegsmarine	Kapitänleutnant	Commander of U-435	27 October 1942	Killed in action 9 July 1943	—
Waldemar Strich	Heer	Hauptmann of the Reserves	Commander of Grenadier-Regiment 1114	23 March 1945*	Killed in action 27 January 1945 (Note: According to Scherzer on 25 January 1945.)	—
Karl-Heinz Stricker	Luftwaffe	Hauptmann	Gruppenkommandeur of the I./Schnellkampfgeschwader 210	2 October 1942*	Killed in action 13 September 1941	—
Hans Strippel+	Heer	Oberfeldwebel	Zugführer (platoon leader) in the 2./Panzer-Regiment 1	22 January 1943	Awarded 485th Oak Leaves 4 June 1944	—
Anton Strobel	Heer	Major of the Reserves	Commander of the II./Artillerie-Regiment 219	13 April 1944	—	—
Paul Strobel	Luftwaffe	Hauptmann	Staffelkapitän of the 7./Kampfgeschwader 4 "General Wever" (Note: According to Scherzer as Staffelkapitän in the III./Kampfgeschwader 4 "General Wever".)	26 March 1944*	Killed in action 19 September 1943	—
Heinrich Strobl	Heer	Leutnant	Frontaufklärungskommando 202 Einheit "Schill" (Note: According to Scherzer on 20 April 1945 as Streifkorpsführer in Frontaufklärungskommando 202 (Einheit "Chill").)	9 May 1945	—	—
Friedrich Strohm+	Heer	Major	Commander of the I./Grenadier-Regiment 480	18 January 1944	Awarded 613th Oak Leaves 18 October 1944	—
Paul Strohmaier	Luftwaffe	Oberleutnant	Chief of the 3./Flak-Regiment 297 (motorized) (Note: According to Scherzer as chief of the 3./gemischtes Flak-Regiment 297 (deployable).)	8 August 1944	—	—
Helmut Strojek	Heer	Feldwebel	Zugführer (platoon leader) in the 4./Grenadier-Regiment 986	17 March 1945	—	—
Wolfram Stronk	Luftwaffe	Hauptmann	Chief of the 6./Fallschirm-Panzer-Regiment "Hermann Göring"	18 October 1944	—	—
Heinrich Strotmann	Heer	Feldwebel	Zugführer (platoon leader) in the 12./Grenadier-Regiment 371	18 November 1943	—	—
Rudolf Struckmann	Heer	Oberleutnant	Adjutant in the Stab/Schützen-Regiment 115	21 January 1942	—	—
Heinz Strüning+	Luftwaffe	Leutnant of the Reserves (Note: According to Scherzer as Leutnant (war officer) and pilot in the 8./Nachtjagdgeschwader 2.)	Pilot in the 3./Nachtjagdgeschwader 1	29 October 1942	Awarded 528th Oak Leaves 20 July 1944	A pilot seated in his fighter craft gestures with a gloved hand.
Herbert Stry	Luftwaffe	Oberleutnant	Pilot in the 5./Sturzkampfgeschwader 3 (Note: According to Scherzer as pilot in the III./Sturzkampfgeschwader 3.)	24 September 1942	—	—
Karl Stubenrauch	Heer	Hauptmann of the Reserves	Chief of the 4./Grenadier-Regiment 282	22 April 1943	—	—
Werner Stuchlick	Luftwaffe	Hauptmann	Leader of the II./Fallschirm-Panzergrenadier-Regiment 2 "Hermann Göring"	30 November 1944	—	—
Hermann Stuckmann	Kriegsmarine	Oberleutnant zur See	Commander of U-621	11 August 1944	—	—
Kurt Student+	Luftwaffe	Generalleutnant	Commander of the 7. Flieger-Division (Note: According to Scherzer as commander of the 7. Flieger-Division (Fallschirmjäger).)	12 May 1940	Awarded 305th Oak Leaves 27 September 1943	Black-and-white picture of a man with peaked cap, military uniform displaying various military decorations.
Otto Studte	Heer	Oberleutnant of the Reserves	Chief of the 8./Artillerie-Regiment 389	16 October 1944*	Died of wounds 9 October 1944	—
Adolf Stück	Heer	Wachtmeister of the Reserves (Note: According to Scherzer as Wachtmeister.)	Vorgeschobener Beobachter (forward observer) in the 1./Artillerie-Regiment 251	26 October 1943	—	—
Gerhard Stüdemann+	Luftwaffe	Oberleutnant	Staffelkapitän of the 9./Sturzkampfgeschwader 77	26 March 1944	Awarded 813th Oak Leaves 28 March 1945	—
Gustav Stühmer+	Heer	Feldwebel	Zugführer (platoon leader) in the 11./Grenadier-Regiment 399	29 December 1942	Awarded 422nd Oak Leaves 6 March 1944	—
Carl-Heinrich von Stülpnagel? (Note: Carl-Heinrich von Stülpnagel, in connection with the 20 July plot, failed attempt to assassinate Adolf Hitler, was deprived of all honours, ranks and orders and dishonourably discharged from the Heer on 14 August 1944. The civilian von Stülpnagel was sentenced to death by the Volksgerichtshof on 30 August 1944 and executed the same day.)	Heer	General der Infanterie	Commander-in-chief of the 17. Armee	21 August 1941	—	A man wearing a military uniform with an Iron Cross displayed at the front of his uniform collar.
Ewald von Stünzner	Heer	Hauptmann	Chief of the 3./Panzer-Abteilung 103	10 September 1942	—	—
Georg von Stünzner	Heer	Oberstleutnant im Generalstab (in the General Staff)	Ia (Operations officer) of the 29. Panzergrenadier-Division	10 September 1943*	Died of wounds 3 September 1943	—
Vitus Stürber	Heer	Oberstleutnant	Leader of Grenadier-Regiment 71 (motorized)	29 December 1942	—	—
Fritz Stürtz	Heer	Major of the Reserves	Commander of Pionier-Bataillon 161	29 February 1944	—	—
(Johann-)Nepomuk Stützle? (Note: Nepomuk Stützle's nomination by his unit was most likely sent as a teleprinter message to the Außenstelle of the Heerespersonalamt (HPA/A—Branch of the Army Staff Office). This nomination no longer exists. A Außenstelle-Heerespersonalamt-Verleihungsvorschlag (HPA/A-VV—Branch of the Army Staff Office Nomination Recommendation) was created and presented to Karl Dönitz for signature. The Oberbefehlshaber Nordwest and HPA/A had approved the nomination. Dönitz signature is missing and the nomination was left unfinished at the end of the war. The Association of Knight's Cross Recipients (AKCR) claims that the presentation was in accordance with the Dönitz-decree. This is illegal according to the Deutsche Dienststelle (WASt) and lacks legal justification. Stützle was a member of the AKCR.)	Heer	Obergefreiter	In the Panzer-Jäger-Abteilung "Großdeutschland"	8 May 1945	—	—
Eberhard Stüwe	Luftwaffe	Hauptmann	Tasked with the dealings of the III./Kampfgeschwader 77 (Note: According to Scherzer as leader of the III./Kampfgeschwader 77.)	5 September 1944	—	—
Wilhelm Stuhlberger	Luftwaffe	Hauptmann	Chief of the 5./Flak-Regiment 29 (motorized)	9 June 1944	—	—
Georg Stumme	Heer	General der Kavallerie	Commanding general of the XXXX. Armeekorps	19 July 1940	—	A man wearing a peaked cap, military uniform with an Iron Cross displayed at the front of his uniform collar.
Erich Stumpe	Luftwaffe	Oberleutnant of the Reserves	Pilot in the 1.(F)/Aufklärungs-Gruppe 121 (Note: According to Scherzer as pilot in the Aufklärungsstaffel 1.(F)/121.)	17 March 1943	—	—
Werner Stumpf	Luftwaffe	Oberfeldwebel	Pilot in the III./Jagdgeschwader 53 (Note: According to Scherzer as pilot in the 9./Jagdgeschwader 53.)	13 August 1942	—	—
Wolfgang Stumpf	Heer	Hauptmann of the Reserves	Chief of the 2./schwere Artillerie-Abteilung 834	7 February 1944*	Killed in action 3 October 1943	—
Hans-Jürgen Stumpff	Luftwaffe	Generaloberst	Chief of Luftflotte 5 and Befehlshaber Nord (commander-in-chief north)	18 September 1941	—	
Horst Stumpff	Heer	Generalleutnant	Commander of the 20. Panzer-Division	29 September 1941	—	—
Joseph Stuppi	Heer	Major	Commander of the II./Infanterie-Regiment 94	2 February 1942	—	—
Alfred Sturm	Luftwaffe	Oberst	Commander of Fallschirmjäger-Regiment 2	9 July 1941	—	A man in semi profile wearing a peaked cap and military uniform with various military decorations.
Hans Sturm	Heer	Gefreiter	Messenger in the 6./Infanterie-Regiment 473	26 September 1942	—	—
[Dr.] Hans-Hermann Sturm	Heer	Oberleutnant	Chief of the 3./Sturmgeschütz-Brigade "Großdeutschland"	9 June 1944	—	—
Heinrich Sturm	Luftwaffe	Leutnant	Staffelführer of the 4./Jagdgeschwader 52	26 March 1944	—	—
Simon Sturm	Heer	Feldwebel	Zugführer (platoon leader) in the 6./Grenadier-Regiment 82	30 April 1943	—	—
Wolff von Stutterheim	Luftwaffe	Generalmajor (Note: According to Scherzer as Generalmajor chargiert (brevet).)	Geschwaderkommodore of Kampfgeschwader 77	4 July 1940	—	—
Josef Styr	Waffen-SS	SS-Hauptscharführer	Zugführer (platoon leader) in the 10./SS-Panzergrenadier-Regiment 9 "Germania"	5 April 1945	—	—
Heinrich Südel	Luftwaffe	Oberleutnant	Observer and Ia (operations officer) in the I./Kampfgeschwader 55 (Note: According to Scherzer as observer in the I./Kampfgeschwader 55.)	7 April 1945	—	—
Rudolf Sürig	Heer	Oberleutnant of the Reserves (Note: According to Scherzer as Oberleutnant des Beurlaubtenstandes (of the reserve status).)	Chief of the 2./Jäger-Bataillon 13	8 February 1943*	Killed in action 28 November 1942	—
Burghard Suermann	Heer	Oberleutnant of the Reserves	Chief of the 7./Grenadier-Regiment 324	24 December 1944	—	—
Ernst Süß	Luftwaffe	Oberfeldwebel	Pilot in the 9./Jagdgeschwader 52 (Note: According to Scherzer as pilot in the III./Jagdgeschwader 52.)	4 September 1942	—	—
Walter Süß+	Heer	Feldwebel	Zugführer (platoon leader) in the Stabskompanie/Grenadier-Regiment 273	9 June 1944	Awarded 717th Oak Leaves 25 January 1945	—
Friedrich Suhr	Allgemeine SS	SS-Obersturmbannführer	Leader of a Kampfgruppe (Befehlshaber Sipo & SD Frankreich) (Note: According to Scherzer as leader of Kampfgruppe "Suhr" with the Befehlshaber Sipo & SD Frankreich.)	11 December 1944	—	
Rudolf Suhr	Heer	Hauptmann	Commander of Panzer-Jäger-Abteilung 150	18 February 1945*	Killed in action 20 January 1945	—
Gerd Suhren	Kriegsmarine	Oberleutnant (Ing.)	Chief engineer on U-37	21 October 1940	—	—
Reinhard Suhren+	Kriegsmarine	Oberleutnant zur See	1st watch officer on U-48	3 November 1940	Awarded 56th Oak Leaves 31 December 1941; 18th Swords 1 September 1942	—
Karl von Le Suire	Heer	General der Gebirgstruppe	Commanding general of the XXXXIX. Gebirgskorps	26 November 1944	—	—
Rudolf Sulzer	Heer	Hauptmann of the Reserves	Commander of the II./Grenadier-Regiment 161	11 January 1944	—	—
Hans Sumpf	Luftwaffe	Oberleutnant	Staffelkapitän of the 5./Kampfgeschwader 1 "Hindenburg"	20 August 1942*	Killed in action 26 March 1942	—
Walter Sumpf	Luftwaffe	Feldwebel	Pilot in the I./Kampfgeschwader 100	12 March 1945	—	—
Heinz Sundmacher	Heer	Major of the Reserves	Commander of the I./Grenadier-Regiment 431	28 February 1945	—	—
Kurt Sunkel	Heer	Oberleutnant (Note: According to Scherzer as Oberleutnant of the Reserves.)	Chief of the 3./Grenadier-Regiment 107	14 May 1944	—	—
Hubert von Svoboda Edler von Asticotal	Luftwaffe	Oberstleutnant	Commander of Flak-Regiment 46 (motorized)	14 January 1945	—	—
Josef Swientek	Waffen-SS	SS-Obersturmbannführer	Commander of SS-Artillerie-Regiment 3 "Totenkopf" (Note: According to Scherzer as commander of SS-Artillerie-Regiment 3.)	16 June 1944	—	—
Lothar Swierzinski	Waffen-SS	SS-Rottenführer	Group leader in the 10./SS-Panzergrenadier-Regiment "Totenkopf" (Note: According to Scherzer as group leader in the 10./SS-Panzergrenadier-Regiment 5 "Thule".)	16 December 1943	—	—
Erwin Sy	Luftwaffe	Oberleutnant	Staffelkapitän of the 4.(K)/Lehrgeschwader 1	22 May 1942	—	—
Otto Sydow	Luftwaffe	Generalmajor	Commander of the 1. Flak-Division Berlin (Note: According to Scherzer as commander of the 20. Flak-Division.)	28 February 1945	—	—
Jan Syrowy	Heer	Unteroffizier	Zugführer (platoon leader) in the 3./Reiter-Regiment 32	30 April 1945	—	—
Paul Szameitat	Luftwaffe	Hauptmann	Gruppenkommandeur of the I./Nachtjagdgeschwader 3 (Note: According to Scherzer as Staffelführer of the 5./Nachtjagdgeschwader 3.)	6 April 1944*	Killed in flying accident 2 January 1944	—
Arnold Szelinski	Heer	Oberst	Commander of Infanterie-Regiment 525	18 November 1941	—	—
Joachim Szyskowitz	Kriegsmarine	Fregattenkapitän	Harbor commander Antwerp	13 October 1944*	Died of wounds 11 September 1944	—
