= Franz Staudegger =

German tank commander (1940–1945)

- Born: 12 February 1923; Unterloibach, Bleiburg, Corinthia, Austria
- Died: 16 March 1991 (aged 68); Frankfurt am Main, Germany
- Military career
- Allegiance: Nazi Germany
- Branch: Waffen SS
- Service years: 1940–1945
- Rank: SS-Unterscharführer
- Units: SS Division Leibstandarte; 101st SS Heavy Panzer Battalion
- Conflicts: World War II; Eastern Front; Operation Barbarossa; Battle of Kursk; Operation Citadel; Western Front; Western Allied invasion of France; Battle of Normandy
- Awards: Knight's Cross of the Iron Cross

Franz Staudegger (12 February 1923 – 16 March 1991) was a German Waffen-SS tank commander during the Second World War. He is known for being "panzer ace" and the first Tiger tank commander awarded the Knight's Cross of the Iron Cross. He was part of the Leibstandarte SS Adolf Hitler (LSSAH).

== Early life ==
Franz Staudegger was the son of an innkeeper and was born on 12 February 1923, in Unterloibach, Carinthia (Austria). He joined the Schutzstaffel (SS) at the age of 17 and was accepted into the reserve battalion of the Leibstandarte SS Adolf Hitler (LSSAH).

== World War II ==
Staudegger was wounded in his first battle and received the black Wound Badge. In March 1942, he was promoted to SS-Sturmmann. After recovering from his injuries and completing re-training as a tank commander, he returned to the LSSAH and became commander of a Panzer III tank in a light platoon led by Michael Wittmann. After being promoted to SS-Unterscharführer on 30 January 1943, Staudegger fought in the Battle of Kharkov. After the city was captured, he was entrusted with commanding a Tiger tank in the platoon of SS-Untersturmführer Helmut Wendorff, and he was later awarded the Iron Cross Second Class (20 March 1943), as well as the Silver Tank Combat Badge (1 April 1943).

On 8 July 1943, during Operation Citadel, a group of 50–60 Soviet T-34 tanks attacked their position. His actions helped weaken enemy forces and alter their tactical plans, and earned him the Knight's Cross of the Iron Cross, making him the first Tiger tank commander to receive the award. Nazi propaganda credits Staudegger with the destruction of 22 enemy tanks. Historian Christopher Lawrence notes that the details of the event are unsupported by unit reports.

== Later life and death ==
Franz Staudegger survived the war, and later worked as a railway official and an insurance clerk. He died in Frankfurt on 16 March 1991. Staudegger was respected by both his crew and his company, but he never achieved the widespread fame of his colleague Michael Wittmann.

== Awards ==
- Wound Badge, black (3rd class)
- Iron Cross 2nd Class (20 March 1943)
- The Silver Panzer Badge (1 April 1943)
- Iron Cross, 1st class (6 July 1943)
- Knight's Cross of the Iron Cross (10 July 1943)
