= 1st Flak Division =

1st Flak Division (1st) Air Defense Command Berlin
- German: 1. Flak-Division; Luftverteidigungs-Kommando Berlin (Nr. 1)
- Active: 1 July 1938 – 2 May 1945
- Country: Nazi Germany
- Branch: Luftwaffe
- Type: Flak
- Role: Anti-aircraft warfare
- Size: Division
- Garrison/HQ: Berlin
- Engagements: Bombing of Berlin in World War II; Battle of Berlin

Commanders
- Notable commanders: Otto Sydow

The 1st Flak Division (German: 1. Flak-Division) was a Flak division of the German Luftwaffe in World War II. Its primary and most noteworthy function throughout the war was the defense of the air space of the city of Berlin.

== History ==
The staff of the 1st Flak Division was created in Berlin (Luftgau III) on 1 July 1938 under the name "Air Defense Command Berlin" (Luftverteidigungs-Kommando Berlin). On 1 August 1939, the name was specified into "1st Air Defense Command Berlin" (Luftverteidigungs-Kommando Berlin Nr. 1). The initial head of the Air Defense Command staff was a Major General named Braun, who was in August 1938 replaced by Gerhard Hoffmann.

At the outbreak of war on 1 September 1939, 1st Air Defense Command consisted of elements of Flak Regiment 12, Flak Regiment 22, Flak Regiment 32, Flak Regiment 52 and Flak Regiment General Göring, spread across the various boroughs of Berlin. The overall HQ was in Berlin-Dahlem, the staffs of Flak Regiment 12, Flak Regiment 22 and Flak Regiment General Göring were positioned at Berlin-Lankwitz, Brandenburg an der Havel and Magdeburg, respectively.

On 1 September 1941, the Air Defense Command Berlin was renamed "1st Flak Division" (Flak-Division 1). On the same day, commander Prellberg was replaced by Ludwig Schilffarth. Schilffarth was in turn replaced by Max Schaller on 20 January 1943, who was succeeded by Erich Kressmann on 18 February 1944 and by Kurt von Ludwig on 5 November 1944.

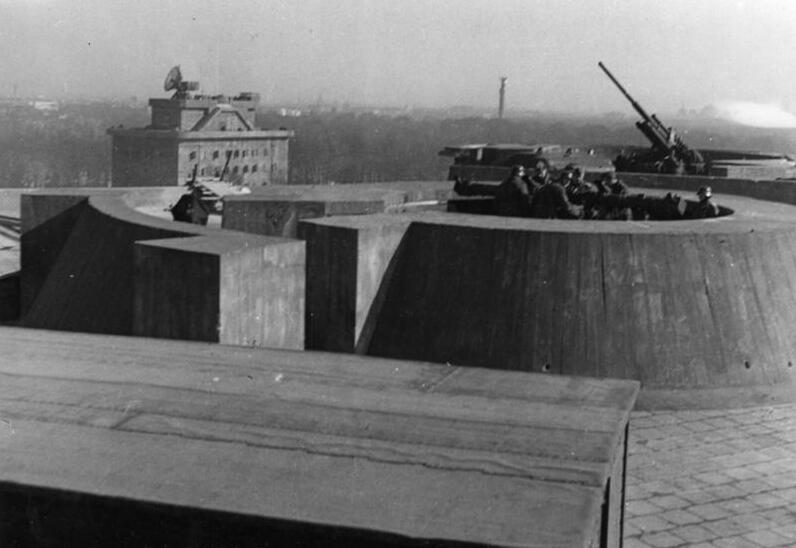
The 1st Flak Division operated the flak towers in Berlin (pictured: Zoo Tower).

Between 1940 and 1945, the 1st Flak Division was the principal defender against the Allied bombing raids against Berlin. The flak defenses of the city were powerful; by 24 January 1944, Berlin was defended by 440 heavy anti-aircraft guns and 400 light anti-aircraft guns, which were supported by 245 searchlights. Additionally, the city was guarded by flak towers, making it one of just three cities equipped with these dedicated anti-aircraft buildings (next to Vienna and Hamburg).

On 2 February 1945, in the face of the rapidly approaching Red Army, the 1st Flak Division was partially repurposed for ground-level combat and, by orders of Wilhelm Keitel, placed under the direct control of the leadership staff of Wehrkreis III, tasked with the defense of the region. In April 1945, the 1st Flak Division was placed under the supervision of the II Flak Corps. The final commander of the 1st Flak Division was Otto Sydow, who held that command post from 15 November 1944 until 2 May 1945, the day of the surrender that ended the Battle of Berlin. Sydow received the Knight's Cross during his tenure as division commander on 28 February 1945. The 1st Flak Division was involved in the power struggle that went on behind the scenes during the Battle of Berlin; attempts by Helmuth Weidling (army commander of Berlin defenders) to subordinate the Luftwaffe's 1st Flak Division as well as Waffen-SS units to his own command were met with resistance in the last days of April 1945. Joseph Goebbels further complicated matters by the creation of yet another defense council to take command of Berlin's defenses.
