= Hans Stollnberger =

- Born: 1 April 1919; Baumgartenberg, Austria
- Died: 4 August 2017 (aged 98); Salzburg, Austria
- Military career
- Allegiance: Nazi Germany
- Branch: Luftwaffe
- Service years: ?–1945
- Rank: Hauptmann
- Units: II.(Schl)./LG 1 SG 1
- Conflicts: World War II: Battle of Britain; Invasion of Yugoslavia; Operation Barbarossa; Siege of Sevastopol (1941–1942); Battle of Kursk
- Awards: Knight's Cross of the Iron Cross

Johann "Hans" Stollnberger (1 April 1919 – 4 August 2017) was a Hauptmann in the Luftwaffe during World War II. He was also a recipient of the Knight's Cross of the Iron Cross. The Knight's Cross of the Iron Cross, and its variants were the highest awards in the military and paramilitary forces of Nazi Germany during World War II. Stollnberger died in Salzburg on 4 August 2017, at the age of 98.

== Early life ==
Johann Stollnberger was born on 10 April 1919 in Baumgartenberg, which was then in the short-lived Republic of German-Austria.

== World War II ==
Stollnberger got his first arial combat experience while part of the 2nd Ground Attack Group of the Lehrgeschwader 2 during the Battle of Britain. He then participated in the Balkans campaign during April and May 1941. We went on to became the leader of a squadron in the newly formed Schlachtgeschwader 1. In the Battle of Kursk, Stollnberger, who was now a Hauptmann, led the 6th squadron of Schlachtgeschwader 1. At some point during the battle, Stollnberger was forced into landing behind enemy lines, where he was stuck, evading capture, for four days. He escaped back to German forces by swimming across the Don River at night. Stollnberger severed as a squadron commander for squadrons within Sturzkampfgeschwader 101, Schlachtgeschwader 10, and Schlachtgeschwader 4 for the remainder of the war. At the end of the war, Stollnberger was a Hauptmann Staffelkapitän.

== Awards and decorations ==
- Flugzeugführerabzeichen
- Front Flying Clasp of the Luftwaffe in Gold with Pennant
- Ehrenpokal der Luftwaffe (16 February 1942)
- Iron Cross (1939)
  - 2nd Class
  - 1st Class
- German Cross in Gold (24 September 1942)
- Knight's Cross of the Iron Cross on 14 October 1942 as Leutnant and Staffelführer of the 8./Schlachtgeschwader 1
