= Ernst Graf Strachwitz =

Ernst Graf Strachwitz von Gross-Zauche und Camminetz (22 December 1919 – 13 July 1998) was a German Wehrmacht officer during World War II, Austrian politician and lawyer.

== Early life ==
He was born in Wöbling near Graz into a family of landowners. After graduating from school and before he began studying Law he worked in Austria where he had joined the Homeland Security, which earned him a temporary arrest after the Anschluss.

During the World War II he took part as an officer in the Gebirgsjäger.

== During the war ==
Strachwitz joined the Gebirgsjäger in 1938, fought as a paratrooper at the Battle of Narvik, on the Western Front and was awarded the Knight's Cross of the Iron Cross on 26 November 1944, while serving in Finland. Ernst Strachwitz acquired the Knight's Cross, when the Soviet army committed their long-prepared large-scale attack on the Arctic front. Captain Strachwitz managed for two days to keep the important bridge over the Titovka against incessant attacks. He finished the war as major and battalion commander with the 2nd Mountain Division. He returned from the war with severe wounds.

== Political career ==
After the end of the war, he had the difficulties as a former officer, but he overcame them and obtained his degree and then joined a law firm in Graz. Later he became a lawyer in Vienna and turned to political activity. He found his first followers in the ranks of the combatants. In April 1949 Strachwitz summoned his followers to a first major conference in Salzburg, where they decided to join forces with the Austrian People's Party (ÖVP). However, this covenant did not last long. He served as a member of the National Council of Austria from 1949 to 1953 for the Austrian People's Party. Despite his close connection to men like Josef Krainer senior, Franz Olah and Hans Dichand, the conservatism he represented increasingly became an outsider. He was the founder of his magazine Neue Ordnung and the Österreichische Gesellschaft where he wrote as a journalist till his death in 1998.

== Awards ==
- Knight's Cross of the Iron Cross on 26 November 1944 as Hauptmann and leader of the II./Gebirgsjäger-Regiment 137

== Bibliography ==
- "Dr. Ernst Strachwitz". Austrian Parliament. 20 July 1998.
- Fellgiebel, Walther-Peer (2000) [1986]. Die Träger des Ritterkreuzes des Eisernen Kreuzes 1939–1945 — Die Inhaber der höchsten Auszeichnung des Zweiten Weltkrieges aller Wehrmachtteile [The Bearers of the Knight's Cross of the Iron Cross 1939–1945 — The Owners of the Highest Award of the Second World War of all Wehrmacht Branches] (in German). Friedberg, Germany: Podzun-Pallas. ISBN 978-3-7909-0284-6.
