= Werner Stumpf =

German flying ace (1917–1942)

- Born: 15 March 1917; Berlin
- Died: 13 October 1942 (aged 25) near El Alamein
- Cause of death: Killed in action
- Military career
- Allegiance: Nazi Germany
- Branch: Luftwaffe
- Service years: 1935–1942
- Rank: Oberfeldwebel
- Unit: JG 53
- Conflicts: World War II: Battle of France; Battle of Britain; Operation Barbarossa; Siege of Malta; North African Campaign; Battle of Gazala
- Awards: Knight's Cross of the Iron Cross

Werner Stumpf (15 March 1917 – 13 October 1942) was a Luftwaffe ace and recipient of the Knight's Cross of the Iron Cross during World War II. Stumpf claimed 48 aerial victories, 2 over the Western Front, 23 over the Eastern Front and 23 over the Mediterranean Front. The Knight's Cross of the Iron Cross, and its variants were the highest awards in the military and paramilitary forces of Nazi Germany during World War II.

== Early life and career ==
Stumpf was born on 15 March 1917 in Berlin, then the capital of the German Empire. In 1934, he joined the military service of the Reichswehr. A year later, Stumpf transferred from the Reichswehr to the newly emerging Luftwaffe where he initially served as a driver. Following flight and fighter pilot training, (Note: Flight training in the Luftwaffe progressed through the levels A1, A2 and B1, B2, referred to as A/B flight training. A training included theoretical and practical training in aerobatics, navigation, long-distance flights and dead-stick landings. The B courses included high-altitude flights, instrument flights, night landings and training to handle the aircraft in difficult situations.) he was assigned to III. Gruppe (3rd group) of Jagdgeschwader 53 (JG 53—53rd Fighter Wing). The Gruppe had been ordered into existence on 26 September 1939. Leadership of the Gruppe was given to Hauptmann Werner Mölders at Wiesbaden–Erbenheim Airfield. Formation of the 7. Staffel (7th squadron) was headed by Oberleutnant Wolf-Dietrich Wilcke and Stumpf was assigned to this squadron holding the rank of Feldwebel (master sergeant). At the time, the Gruppe was equipped with the Messerschmitt Bf 109 E.

== World War II ==
Werner Stumpf joined the Luftwaffe in 1935, he participated in the Battle of France and the Battle of Britain. During the Battle of Britain he claimed his first two victories.

=== Operation Barbarossa ===
On 8 June 1941, the bulk of JG 53's air elements moved via Jever, in northern Germany, to Mannheim-Sandhofen. There the aircraft were given a maintenance overhaul prior to moving east. On 12 June, III. Gruppe was ordered to transfer to a forward airfield at Sobolewo. On 21 June, the Geschwaderkommodore (wing commander) of JG 53 and its Gruppenkommandeure were summoned to nearby Suwałki, where Generalfeldmarschall (field marshal) Albert Kesselring gave the final instructions for the upcoming attack. Wilcke, who had been appointed Gruppenkommandeur of III. Gruppe on 12 August 1940, briefed his pilots that evening.

During Operation Barbarossa, Stumpf claimed 23 aerial victories.

III. Gruppe began returning to Germany in early October 1941. The air elements left the Soviet Union on 4 October, while the ground units were transported back by train to Mannheim on 13 October. Since 22 June 1941, III. Gruppe had claimed 769 aerial victories for the loss of 6 pilots killed, 7 missing in action, 2 captured and 12 wounded.

=== Malta and North Africa ===
After its return to Germany, III. Gruppe was deployed to the Mediterranean Theater. The ground elements of III. Gruppe arrived in Catania in Sicily on 28 November 1941 while the rest of the Gruppe arrived on 3 December. Three days later, III. Gruppe was ordered to move to Timimi in Libya. On 11 December, III. Gruppe moved to an airfield west of Derna. Here the following day, the Gruppe flew multiple combat air patrols. That afternoon, they encountered RAF fighters and claimed seven aerial victories, including two Hurricane fighters by Stumpf. On 14 December, Stumpf claimed a Curtiss P-40 Warhawk fighter shot down in the combat area near Gazala.

III. Gruppe relocated back to Sicily on 17 December for operations in the siege of Malta. The island of Malta had a strategically important position in the Mediterranean Sea. With the opening of a new front in North Africa in mid-1940, British air and sea forces based on the island could attack Axis ships transporting vital supplies and reinforcements from Europe to North Africa. To counter this threat, the Luftwaffe and the Regia Aeronautica (Italian Royal Air Force) conducted bombing raids to neutralize the RAF defenses and the ports. On 9 March 1942 on a mission to Malt, Stumpf claimed two Hurricanes shot down. Four days later, he claimed a Spitfire destroyed.

Stumpf was awarded the Knight's Cross of the Iron Cross (Ritterkreuz des Eisernen Kreuzes) on 13 August 1942 for 42 aerial victories claimed.

On 13 October 1942, Stumpf was killed in action on a Junkers Ju 87 dive bomber escort mission to the combat area at El Alamein. On this mission, his Messerschmitt Bf 109 F-4 (Werknummer 10175) was shot down by anti-aircraft fire near El Alamein. He was interred at the El Alamein German war cemetery.

== Summary of career ==
=== Aerial victory claims ===
Mathews and Foreman, authors of Luftwaffe Aces — Biographies and Victory Claims, researched the German Federal Archives and found records for 48 aerial victory claims. This number includes two claims during the Battle of Britain, 23 on the Eastern Front, and 23 in the Mediterranean theater.

Chronicle of aerial victories
This and the ? (question mark) indicates information discrepancies listed by Prien, Stemmer, Rodeike, Bock, Mathews and Foreman.
Claim	Date	Time	Type	Location	Claim	Date	Time	Type	Location
– 7. Staffel of Jagdgeschwader 53 – Battle of Britain and on the English Channel — 26 June 1940 – 7 June 1941
1	1 September 1940	12:20	Hurricane	Thames Estuary	2	2 September 1940	17:50	Spitfire	
– 7. Staffel of Jagdgeschwader 53 – Operation Barbarossa — 22 June – 7 August 1941
3	22 June 1941	04:05	DI-6		15	3 August 1941	08:20	I-18 (MiG-1)	
4	22 June 1941	06:35	I-16		16	12 August 1941	07:00	DB-3	
5	22 June 1941	17:20	DB-3		17	24 August 1941	15:48	SB-2	
6	22 June 1941	17:23	DB-3		18	27 August 1941	13:45	V-11 (Il-2)	
7	25 June 1941	10:30	DB-3		19	27 August 1941	13:50	V-11 (Il-2)	
8	25 June 1941	12:30	DB-3		20	29 August 1941	18:19	DB-3	
9	26 June 1941	04:11	I-15		21	31 August 1941	11:20	V-11 (Il-2)	east of Barok
10	26 June 1941	04:30	DB-3		22	31 August 1941	11:24	V-11 (Il-2)	east of Barok
11	26 July 1941	05:40	DB-3		23	3 September 1941	08:40	I-16	
12	26 July 1941	05:45	DB-3	south of Duchowschtschina	24	9 September 1941? (Note: According to Mathews and Foreman claimed on 10 September 1941.)	12:10	I-16	
13	29 July 1941	12:11	Pe-2		25	16 September 1941	15:55	I-18 (MiG-1)	
14	30 July 1941	08:57	DB-3	east of Rybki					
– 7. Staffel of Jagdgeschwader 53 – Mediterranean Theater — 25 November – December 1941
26	12 December 1941	16:03	Hurricane		28	14 December 1941	15:50	P-40	
27	12 December 1941	16:05	Hurricane						
– 9. Staffel of Jagdgeschwader 53 – Mediterranean Theater — December 1941 – 31 December 1942
29	9 March 1942	15:30	Hurricane		39	12 June 1942	11:30	Hurricane	east of El Adem
30	9 March 1942	15:33	Hurricane		40	14 June 1942	11:06	Hurricane	
31	15 March 1942	11:15	Spitfire	north of Ħal Far	41	1 July 1942	18:40	Hurricane	
32	18 March 1942	17:25	Hurricane	south of Ħal Far	42	17 July 1942	11:08	Spitfire	northeast of El Alamein
33	12 May 1942	11:37	Spitfire	5 km (3.1 mi) east of Marsaxlokk	43	6 September 1942? (Note: According to Mathews and Foreman claimed on 7 September 1942.)	17:18	Spitfire	5 km (3.1 mi) northeast of El Alamein
34	14 May 1942	17:29	Spitfire	15 km (9.3 mi) southwest of Dingli	44	8 September 1942	12:30? (Note: According to Mathews and Foreman claimed at 13:00.)	Spitfire	20 km (12 mi) south-southeast of El Alamein
35	27 May 1942	09:10	P-40	3 km (1.9 mi) southeast of El Adem	45	12 September 1942	10:23	Spitfire	60 km (37 mi) south-southeast of El Alamein
36	30 May 1942	14:25	P-40	southwest of El Adem	46	13 October 1942	09:40	P-40	
37	1 June 1942	16:30	P-40	15 km (9.3 mi) southwest of Fort Acroma	47	13 October 1942	09:42	Spitfire	
38	11 June 1942	16:40	Hurricane	west of El Adem	48	13 October 1942	09:45	Spitfire	

=== Awards ===
- Iron Cross (1939) 2nd and 1st Class
- German Cross in Gold on 25 February 1942 as Oberfeldwebel in the 9./Jagdgeschwader 53
- Knight's Cross of the Iron Cross on 13 August 1942 as Oberfeldwebel and pilot in III./Jagdgeschwader 53 (Note: According to Scherzer as pilot in the 9./Jagdgeschwader 53.)
