= Egon Stoll-Berberich =

German pilot of the Luftwaffe (1913–1973)

- Born: June 17, 1913
- Died: May 2, 1973 (aged 59); Bensheim
- Occupation: Pilot of the Luftwaffe

Egon Stoll-Berberich (17 June 1913 – 2 May 1973) was a German pilot of the Luftwaffe during World War II. He flew 734 combat missions, during which he destroyed more than 50 enemy tanks (46 according to some sources), seven bridges over the Desna, Dnieper, and Tim rivers, and two armored trains, in a career that spanned both the Western and Eastern theaters of the war, including the Mediterranean theater. For his actions, he was decorated with several awards, including the German Cross in Gold and the Knight's Cross of the Iron Cross, both for acts of bravery.

Later, after leaving the armed forces with the rank of Hauptmann (Captain), he joined the post-war Bundeswehr, where he reached the rank of Lieutenant Colonel.
