= Otto Sydow =

- Born: 1 February 1896; Rosemarsow, district of Demmin
- Died: 24 June 1970 (aged 74); Diepholz
- Military career
- Allegiance: German Empire (to 1918); Weimar Republic (to 1920); Nazi Germany
- Branch: Prussian Army (1914–1918); Reichsheer (1918–1920); Luftwaffe (1935–1945)
- Service years: 1914–1920; 1935–1945
- Rank: Generalmajor
- Commands: 20th Flak Division; 1st Flak Division
- Conflicts: World War I World War II: Battle of France; Eastern Front; Battle of Berlin
- Awards: Knight's Cross of the Iron Cross
- Other work: Police officer

Otto Sydow (1 February 1896 – 24 June 1970) was a highly decorated Generalmajor in the Luftwaffe during World War II. He was also a recipient of the Knight's Cross of the Iron Cross.

Otto Sydow was captured by Soviet troops in May 1945 and was held until October 1955.

== Awards and decorations ==
- Wound Badge (1914)
  - in Black (9 July 1918)
- Iron Cross (1914)
  - 2nd Class (7 March 1917)
- Cross of Honor
- Sudetenland Medal with "Prague Castle Bar"
- Iron Cross (1939)
  - 2nd Class (4 December 1940)
  - 1st Class (25 August 1941)
- Anti-Aircraft Flak Battle Badge (12 December 1941)
- Eastern Front Medal
- German Cross in Gold (24 September 1942)
- Knight's Cross of the Iron Cross on 28 February 1945 as Generalmajor and commander of 1. Flak-Division Berlin

Military offices
Preceded by Generalleutnant Georg Neuffer	Commander of 20th Flak Division; 1 October 1943 – October 1944	Succeeded by Oberst Dr. Hermann Rudhart
Preceded by Generalmajor Kurt von Ludwig	Commander of 1st Flak Division; 15 November – 2 May 1945	Succeeded by None
