= German and Allied order of battle for Operation Bodenplatte =

Unternehmen Bodenplatte (Operation Baseplate or Operation Ground Plate), launched on 1 January 1945, was an attempt by the Luftwaffe to cripple Allied air forces in the Low Countries during Second World War. The Germans husbanded their resources in the preceding months at the expense of the Defence of the Reich units in what was a last-ditch effort to keep up the momentum of the German Army (German: Heer) during the stagnant stage of the Battle of the Bulge (German: Unternehmen Wacht am Rhein).

The following is an order of battle of Allied and German forces.

== German order of battle ==
On 31 December 1944, the Luftwaffe had the following available for Bodenplatte under Luftwaffenkommando West (Air Command West) (Joseph Schmid):

=== II Jagdkorps (Dietrich Peltz) ===
==== 3rd Jagddivision (3rd Fighter Division) (Walter Grabmann) at Wiedenbrück ====
Parent unit	Geschwader Base	Unit (Gruppe)	Aircraft type	Commanding officer
Jagdgeschwader 1	Twente/Drope/Rheine	Stab and I./II./III. Gruppe	Fw 190 and Bf 109	Herbert Ihlefeld
Jagdgeschwader 3	Sennelager/Paderborn/Bad Lippspringe/Gutersloh	Stab/I./II./III./IV.	Fw 190 and Bf 109	Heinrich Bär
Jagdgeschwader 6	Quakenbruck/Delmenhorst/Vechta/Bissel	Stab/I./II./III.	Fw 190 and Bf 109	Johann Kogler
Jagdgeschwader 26	Furstenau/Furstenau/Nordhorn/Plantlunne	Stab/I./II./III.	Fw 190 and Bf 109	Josef Priller
Jagdgeschwader 27	Rheine/Rheine/Hopsten/Hesepe/Achmer	Stab/I./II./III./IV.	Bf 109	Ludwig Franzisket
Jagdgeschwader 54	Furstenau/Vorden	III./IV.	Fw 190 and Bf 109	N/A - only III and IV Gruppen took part.
Jagdgeschwader 77	Dortmund/Dortmund/Bonninghardt/Düsseldorf	Stab/I./II./III.	Bf 109	Siegfried Freytag

==== Jagdabschnittsführer Mittelrhein (Fighter Sector Leader Middle Rhine) ====
Parent unit	Geschwader Base	Unit (Gruppe)	Aircraft type	Commanding officer
Jagdgeschwader 2	Nidda/Merzhausen/Nidda/Altenstadt	Stab/I./II./III.	Fw 190 and Bf 109	Kurt Bühligen
Jagdgeschwader 4	Rhein-Main/Darmstadt-Griesheim/Rhein-Main	Stab/I./II./III./IV.		Gerhard Michalski
Jagdgeschwader 11	Biblis/Biblis/Zellhausen/Gross-Ostheim	Stab/I./II./III.	Fw 190 and Bf 109	Günther Specht
Schlachtgeschwader 4	Bonn-Hangelar/Bonn-Hangelar/Koln-Butzweilerhof/Koln-Wahn	Stab/I./II./III.	Fw 190	Alfred Druschel

==== 5th Jagddivision (5th Fighter Division) (Karl Hentschell) at Karlsruhe ====
Parent unit	Geschwader Base	Unit (Gruppe)	Aircraft type	Commanding officer
Jagdgeschwader 53	Stuttgart-Echterdingen/Malmsheim/Kirrlach/Stuggart-Echterdingen	Stab/II./III./IV.	Bf 109	Helmut Bennemann

==== 3rd Fliegerdivision (3rd Air Division) ====
Parent unit	Geschwader Base	Unit (Gruppe)	Aircraft type	Commanding officer
Kampfgeschwader 51	Rheine/Hopsten/Hesepe/Munster-Handorf	Stab/II./III./IV.	Me 262	Wolfgang Schenck

== Allied order of battle ==
=== RAF No. 83 Group ===
The Allies had the following forces: No. 83 Group RAF:

Wing number	Squadron numbers	Aircraft type	Airfield
121	174/175/184	Hawker Typhoon	Volkel
122	3/56/80/274/486	Hawker Tempest	Volkel
124	137/181/182/247	Typhoon	Eindhoven
126	401/402/411/412/442	Supermarine Spitfire	Ophoven
127	403/416	Spitfire	Evere
143	168/438/439/440	Typhoon	Eindhoven
39 Recce Wing	400/414/430	Spitfire	Gilze-Rijen

=== RAF No. 84 Group ===
No. 84 Group RAF:

Wing number	Squadrons	Aircraft type	Airfield
131	302/308/317	Spitfire	St. Denis Westrem
132	66/127/322/331/332	Spitfire	Woensdrecht
135	349/485	Spitfire	Maldegem
145	341/74/329/345	Spitfire	Deurne
146	193/197/257/263/266	Typhoon	Deurne
35 Recce Wing	2/4/268	P-51 Mustang/Spitfire	Gilze-Rijen

=== RAF No. 2 Group ===
No. 2 Group RAF:

Wing number	Squadrons	Aircraft type	Airfield
139	98/180/320	B-25 Mitchell	Melsbroek
34 Recce Wing	16/69/140	Spitfire/Vickers Wellington/de Havilland Mosquito	Melsbroek

=== American Tactical Air Forces ===
Ninth Air Force:

Fighter Group	Squadrons	Aircraft type	Commanding officer
366	389/390/391	P-47 Thunderbolt	Colonel Norman Holt
352	486/487/328	P-51 Mustang	Colonel James Mayden
48	492/493/494	P-47	Colonel James Johnson
36	22/23/53	P-47	Lt Colonel Van H. Slayden
363	33	F-5 Lightning	Colonel James Smelley
373	410/411/412	P-47	Colonel James McGehee
365	386/387/388	P-47	Colonel Ray Stecker
362	377/378/379	P-51	Colonel Joseph Laughlin
50	10/81/313	P-47	Colonel Harvey Case
358	365/366/367	P-47	Colonel James Tipton Laughlin

=== American Strategic Air Forces ===
Although some of its units were present, the Eighth Air Force is not listed on the Allied order of battle.

== See also ==
- Luftwaffe Organization
- German Air Fleets in World War II
