= Gerhard Schöpfel =

German fighter ace and Knight's Cross recipient

- Schöpfel as Hauptmann
- Born: 19 December 1912; Erfurt
- Died: 17 May 2003 (aged 90); Bergisch Gladbach-Refrath
- Military career
- Allegiance: Nazi Germany
- Branch: Luftwaffe
- Service years: 1936–1945
- Rank: Major (major)
- Units: JG 26, JG 54, JG 4, JG 6
- Commands: JG 26, JG 4, JG 6
- Conflicts: See battles World War II: Battle of France; Battle of Dunkirk; Battle of Britain; Kanalkampf; The Hardest Day; Channel Front; Operation Donnerkeil; Dieppe Raid
- Awards: Knight's Cross of the Iron Cross
- Other work: law

Gerhard Schöpfel (19 December 1912 – 17 May 2003) was a German Luftwaffe military aviator and wing commander during World War II. As a fighter ace, he is credited with 45 aerial victories claimed in approximately 700 combat missions, all of which on the Western Front.

Born in Erfurt, Schöpfel grew up in the Weimar Republic and Nazi Germany and joined the German police force. In 1936, he transferred to the Luftwaffe and following flight training was posted to a fighter wing. In September 1939, Schöpfel became a squadron leader in Jagdgeschwader 26 "Schlageter" (JG 26—26th Fighter Wing). Flying with this wing, Schöpfel claimed his first aerial victory on 19 May 1940 during the Battle of France. In August 1941, he was given command of III. Gruppe of JG 26. During the Battle of Britain, he was awarded the Knight's Cross of the Iron Cross on 11 September for 20 aerial victories claimed. In December 1941, Schöpfel was appointed Geschwaderkommodore (wing commander) of JG 26, a position he held until January 1943.

Schöpfel then held various staff positions with Jagdfliegerführer Bretagne, Jagdfliegerführer Sizilien and Jagdfliegerführer Norwegen. In May 1944, he was posted to Jagdgeschwader 54 (JG 54—54th Fighter Wing) and in June was given command of Jagdgeschwader 4 (JG 4—4th Fighter Wing). In April 1945, he was appointed commander of Jagdgeschwader 6 (JG 6—6th Fighter Wing). At the end of the war, he became a Soviet prisoner of war and was released in December 1949. Schöpfel died on 15 May 2003 in Bergisch Gladbach.

== Early life and career ==
Schöpfel was born on 19 December 1912 at Erfurt, at the time in Province of Saxony of the German Empire. Serving with the Landespolizei (state police), he transferred to the Luftwaffe in 1936 and held the rank of Oberfähnrich (officer cadet). Following flight training, (Note: Flight training in the Luftwaffe progressed through the levels A1, A2 and B1, B2, referred to as A/B flight training. A training included theoretical and practical training in aerobatics, navigation, long-distance flights and dead-stick landings. The B courses included high-altitude flights, instrument flights, night landings and training to handle the aircraft in difficult situations.) Schöpfel was assigned to I. Gruppe (1st group) of Jagdgeschwader 135 (JG 135—135th Fighter Wing). This unit had been formed on 1 April 1937 and was commanded by Major Max Ibel. On 1 November 1938, the Gruppe became the I. Gruppe of Jagdgeschwader 233 (JG 233—233rd Fighter Wing) and was again renamed on 1 May 1939, this time becoming the I. Gruppe of Jagdgeschwader 51 (JG 51—51st Fighter Wing). Initially flying the Heinkel He 51, the unit was reequipped with the Messerschmitt Bf 109 B in November 1937. In 1938, Schöpfel was transferred to the Stab (HQ) flight of I. Gruppe of Jagdgeschwader 334 (JG 334—334th Fighter Wing). This unit was initially commanded by Hauptmann Walter Grabmann and later by Major Gotthard Handrick. This Gruppe also underwent a few name changes. On 1 November 1938, it received the designation I. Gruppe of Jagdgeschwader 132 (JG 132—132nd Fighter Wing) and then again on 1 May 1939 when it was referred to as I. Gruppe of Jagdgeschwader 26 "Schlageter" (JG 26—26th Fighter Wing).

== World War II ==
World War II in Europe began on Friday 1 September 1939 when German forces invaded Poland. Oberleutnant Schöpfel was assigned as commander of 9. Staffel (9th squadron) of JG 26, a squadron of III. Gruppe, on 23 September 1939. He claimed his first aerial victory during the Battle of France on 19 May 1940. In combat with the British Expeditionary Force and Royal Air Force (RAF), 9. Staffel attacked Lille-Marck. Schöpfel claimed a Hawker Hurricane fighter shot down northeast of Courtrai, the claim remained unconfirmed. The opponent may have been Flying Officer Dick Pexton, 615 Squadron. Pexton may have been attacked simultaneously by Schöpfel and Unteroffizier Bernard Eberz. The German pilots claimed a Hurricane each—Pexton was wounded in the legs.

He claimed his first confirmed aerial victory on 29 May during the Battle of Dunkirk. At 18:10, he shot down a Supermarine Spitfire west of Dunkirk. The Spitfire belonged to either No. 64, No. 229 or No. 610 Squadron. Two days later, Schöpfel shot down a No. 609 Squadron Spitfire over Dunkirk. He claimed his last aerial victory of the Battle of France on 2 June in combat with No. 66, No. 266 or No. 611 Squadron Spitfires, claiming his fourth victory in total at 09:25.

On 6 June, Hauptmann Adolf Galland was appointed Gruppenkommandeur (group commander) of III. Gruppe, replacing Major Ernst Freiherr von Berg. The Armistice of 22 June 1940 ended the Battle of France and III. Gruppe was ordered to Mönchen-Gladbach for a period of maintenance and replenishment. On 21 July, III. Gruppe was moved to an airfield at Caffiers in northern France, close to the English Channel in preparation for the Battle of Britain. Schöpfel claimed his first two aerial victories during the Battle of Britain on 8 August. In a mission to Dover, clearing the airspace ahead of Junkers Ju 87 dive bombers from Luftflotte 3 (Air Fleet 3) attacking Allied convoy Peewit during the Kanalkampf, Schöpfel claimed a No. 600 Squadron Bristol Blenheim bomber and a No. 65 Squadron Spitfire destroyed. The Blenheim crashed into the sea off Ramsgate. Flying Officer D. N. Grice, Sergeant F. J. Keast and A.C.J.B.Q Warren were all killed in action. Schöpfel had originally misidentified the Blenheim and filed the claim over a Handley Page Hampden bomber. On 12 August, one day before Adlertag, he claimed a Spitfire shot down near Folkestone. The downed aircraft belonged to either No. 151 or No. 501 Squadron, but neither squadron operated the Spitfire at this time. No. 151 reported the loss of three Hurricanes, and one pilot, while No. 501 lost two fighters and one pilot killed—the surviving pilot being Squadron leader A. L. Holland. The day after Adlertag, he claimed a Hurricane from either No. 32 or No. 615 Squadron. This claim was not confirmed. 32 Squadron suffered damage to three Hurricanes in force-landings after aerial combat; all pilots unhurt. British sources attribute the loss of two pilots and two Hurricanes from 615 Squadron to Messerschmitt Bf 110s.

On 18 August, Schöpfel fought in the large air battles which characterised the Battle of Britain. Schöpfel led III. Gruppe of JG 26 and Bf 109s from Jagdgeschwader 3, 40 in total, across the Strait of Dover to sweep the skies clear ahead of the main raid. Some 25 miles behind him were the 27 Do 17s of I. and III./KG 76 escorted by 20 Bf 110s that were to strike RAF Kenley. As the advance led by Schöpfel made their way past the coast it spotted a vic-formation of RAF fighters. They were Hurricanes of 501 Squadron which were conducting wide spirals to gain height. Schöpfel bounced them and claimed four in two minutes killing one pilot and wounding three others. As he departed other members of his Geschwader dived on the Squadron and an inconclusive dogfight ensued. Schöpfel's victims were Donald McKay and Pilot Officers J.W Bland, Pilot Officer Kenneth Lee and F. Kozlowski. Bland was the only one killed. This combat took place over Canterbury in the timeframe 13:55 to 13:56. Lee, who was wounded, bailed out near Whitstable.

=== Group commander ===
On 22 August, Galland was appointed Geschwaderkommodore (wing commander) of JG 26 and Schöpfel, who had led 9. Staffel until then, succeeded him as Gruppenkommandeur of III. Gruppe. His successor as Staffelkapitän (squadron leader) of 9. Staffel was Oberleutnant Heinz Ebeling. That day, Galland led the Geschwader in an attack on Manston Airfield. In combat with No. 65 Squadron, Schöpfel claimed a Spitfire shot down at 20:25 CET southeast of Dover. Sergeant M Keymar was killed in a Spitfire over Dover at 19:25 GMT. On 28 August, the Luftwaffe attacked the airfields at Eastchurch and Rochford. In defense of this attack, the RAF dispatched 32 Hurricane fighters and 12 Boulton Paul Defiant interceptor aircraft from No. 264 Squadron. In this encounter, Schöpfel was credited with the destruction of a Defiant shot down east of Canterbury. 264 Squadron suffered the loss of four Defiants and three damaged. Five men (pilots and gunners) were killed and one wounded, Squadron Leader D. G. Garvin was the injured man when L7021 was destroyed. Another solitary claim was made on 31 August but III./JG 26 lost four Bf 109s in combat with 85 and 54 Squadron. One pilot was missing, one rescued, and two were posted in missing in action.

The Blitz bombing campaign during the Battle of Britain began on 7 September 1940. That day, on a mission to London, Schöpfel claimed a No. 603 Squadron shot down at 18:45. During an attack on the London Docks on 9 September, Schöpfel claimed three No. 92 Squadron Spitfires shot down over the Thames Estuary, taking his total to 20 aerial victories claimed. According to British loss lists, 92 Squadron lost only two Spitfires this day; Pilot Officer C. H Saunders was wounded in L1077, and Pilot Officer W. C Watling in P9372. On 11 September, Schöpfel may have shot down a No. 235 Squadron Blenheim bomber on a mission to bomb Calais harbour. That day, he was awarded the Knight's Cross of the Iron Cross (Ritterkreuz des Eisernen Kreuzes) for 20 aerial victories claimed, the second pilot of JG 26 to receive this distinction. The Blenheim was in fact escorting Fairey Albacore aircraft. Pilot Officers P. C. Wickings-Smith, A. W. V. Green and Sergeant R. D .H Watts were killed.

On 29 October, JG 26 targeted the North Weald Airfield. The attack began just as Hurricanes from No. 257 Squadron were taking off. In this encounter, Schöpfel claimed a Hurricane shot down at 17:45, it was observed that the pilot bailed out. Two Hurricanes were hit in the attack. Sergeant A. G. Girdwood burned to death when a bomb exploded next to his Hurricane on take-off. Pilot Officer F. Surma parachuted from P3893 unhurt at an altitude of 3,000 feet. On 1 November, JG 26 escorted Ju 87s in an attack on Alied shipping off the Nore. On this escort mission, Schöpfel claimed a No. 92 Squadron Spitfire shot down over Herne Bay, his last in 1940.

Schöpfel claimed his first aerial victory in 1941 on 17 June. That day, the RAF flew "Circus" No. 14 targeting the Etabs Kuhlmann Chemical Works and power station at Chocques. (Note: According to Franks, the RAF flew "Circus" No. 13 on 17 June.) In total, No. 2 Group sent 23 Blenheim bombers, escorted by fighters from North Weald and Biggin Hill. JG 26 claimed 15 aerial victories including a No. 56 or No. 242 Squadron Hurricane by Schöpfel. Schöpfel claimed two aerial victories on 9 August 1941. Author Thomas assumes that one of the Spitfires was piloted by Flight Lieutenant Lionel Harwood 'Buck' Casson from No. 616 Squadron. On 19 October, III. Gruppe moved to a makeshift airfield at Coquelles, close to Calais on the English Channel. There, they began preparations for operating the then new Focke-Wulf Fw 190 A-1. The Gruppe was fully reequipped and operational with the Fw 190 in mid-November 1941.

=== Wing commander ===
Emblem of JG 26

On 5 December 1941, Galland was appointed General der Jagdflieger (General of Fighters). In consequence of Galland's advance in command responsibility, Schöpfel succeeded him as Geschwaderkommodore of JG 26 on 6 December and Hauptmann Josef Priller became the new Gruppenkommandeur of III. Gruppe. Three days later, he was awarded the German Cross in Gold (Deutsches Kreuz in Gold) on 9 December. In December, he was also promoted to Major (major).

In February 1942 he led III. Gruppe in Operation Donnerkeil. The objective of this operation was to give the German battleships Scharnhorst and Gneisenau and the heavy cruiser Prinz Eugen fighter protection in the breakout from Brest to Germany. The Channel Dash operation (11–13 February 1942) by the Kriegsmarine was codenamed Operation Cerberus by the Germans. In support of this, the Luftwaffe, formulated an air superiority plan dubbed Operation Donnerkeil for the protection of the three German capital ships. They intercepted Lieutenant Commander Eugene Esmonde, acting as Squadron Leader, No. 825 Squadron Fleet Air Arm, in a Fairey Swordfish. Frail and slow, the Swordfish forced German pilots to lower their undercarriages to prevent overshooting the biplanes. In the event all six Swordfish of this unit were shot down. Several managed to fire off their torpedoes at German ships but none found their mark. Lieutenant Commander Esmonde was shot down and killed by an Fw 190.

Schöpfel claimed an unconfirmed aerial victory over a No. 411 Squadron Spitfire on 24 March. That day, the RAF targeted the Comines power station with "Circus" No. 116. On 14 April 1942, Schöpfel shot down Flight Lieutenant Cyril Wood from No. 403 Squadron. During the Dieppe Raid on 19 August, Schöpfel claimed two aerial victories in the vicinity of Dieppe. He shot down a No. 501 Squadron Spitfire at 16:31 and a No. 222 Squadron Spitfire at 18:30, the last claim by JG 26 of the day.

On 8 November 1942, Anglo–American forces launched Operation Torch (8–16 November 1942), the invasion of French North Africa. In consequence, Schöpfel was ordered to send the 11. (Höhen) Staffel of JG 26, the high altitude squadron equipped with the Bf 109 G, to North Africa. That day, Schöpfel may have claimed two Boeing B-17 Flying Fortress bombers shot down. These claims are attributed to his personal records and cannot be verified by other records. Schöpfel claimed his 45th and last aerial victory on 6 December 1942 over a B-17. That day, the VIII Bomber Command had targeted the steel works at Lille with 66 B-17s. Schöpfel's claim may have been a B-17 from the 305th Bombardment Group. According to Matthews and Foreman, Schöpfel claimed a final B-17 shot down on 20 December. That day, VIII Bomber Command had again targeted Lille. On this raid, six B-17s were lost over France and further 31 aircraft sustained combat damage. According to Caldwell, no claim was filed by Schöpfel.

On 8 January 1943, Schöpfel attended a conference hosted by General der Jagdflieger Galland in Berlin. There, Schöpfel was informed by Galland that on 10 January, he would pass on command of JG 26 to Major Josef Priller and that Schöpfel would be appointed Ia (Operations Officer) with Jagdfliegerführer 2, the fighter controller responsible for protecting the German U-boat bases in France. In a post World War II interview, Galland commented on Schöpfel:

"I knew Schöpfel was not the right man ... He was a nice guy, but not a strong leader ... Priller was better. He was the aggressive type."

=== Luftwaffe staff positions ===
Schöpfel left JG 26 on 10 January 1943, with 45 victories, to take up a number of administrative roles. Following his tenure with Jagdfliegerführer Bretagne, he then went to serve as Fighter Operations Officer for the South Italy Command from July (during the critical Sicily landings) and then Jafü (Fighter Leader) Norway from January 1944.

He returned to a combat command on 1 May 1944, briefly joining the staff of III. Gruppe of Jagdgeschwader 54 (JG 54—54th Fighter Wing) for a month. This was based in Germany on Reich Defense, and he mentored the newly promoted Gruppenkommandeur Siegfried Schnell who had previously commanded 9./JG 2 alongside Schöpfel on the Channel Front. Then, ion 15 June 1944, he was appointed Geschwaderkommodore of the newly formed Jagdgeschwader 4 (JG 4—4th Fighter Wing), taking over command from Major Walther Dahl who was transferred. JG 4 at the time was based at Ansbach. The Geschwader had been formed from Jagdgeschwader z.b.V. as a special purpose unit which was fighting in Defense of the Reich. On 6 August, Schöpfel was shot down in aerial combat with North American P-51 Mustang fighters near Schwerin flying a Bf 109 G-6 (Werknummer 440728—factory number). Forced to bail out, his injuries were serious enough that he had to give up his command on 6 August to Oberstleutnant Gerhard Michalski.

In October 1944 Schöpfel was appointed to the newly created role of Jagdfliegerführer Ungarn (Fighter Leader Hungary). In February 1945 he commanded the Luftkriegsschule 2 (training school) at Gatow. On 10 April, he was appointed the last Geschwaderkommodore of Jagdgeschwader 6 (JG 6—6th Fighter Wing) based in northern Czechoslovakia.

After serving on the Eastern Front for approximately one month, Schöpfel was captured by Soviet forces, and was interned for four and a half years in the Soviet Union. He returned to Germany upon his release in December 1949.

== Later life ==
After World War II, Schöpfel worked as a chauffeur and other jobs before obtaining an executive position with Air Lloyd at the Cologne Bonn Airport. He died of natural causes on 17 May 2003 at the age of 90 in Bergisch Gladbach-Refrath.

== Summary of career ==
=== Aerial victory claims ===
According to Obermaier, Schöpfel was credited with 45 aerial victories, claimed in approximately 700 combat missions. Mathews and Foreman, authors of Luftwaffe Aces: Biographies and Victory Claims, researched the German Federal Archives and found records for 40 aerial victory claims, plus nine further unconfirmed claims, all of which were claimed on the Western Front.

Chronicle of aerial victories
This and the – (dash) indicates unconfirmed aerial victory claims for which Schöpfel did not receive credit. This and the ? (question mark) indicates information discrepancies listed by Caldwell, Prien, Stemmer, Rodeike, Bock, Matthews and Foreman.
Claim	Date	Time	Type	Location	Claim	Date	Time	Type	Location
– 9. Staffel of Jagdgeschwader 26 "Schlageter" – Battle of France — 10 May – 25 June 1940
—	19 May 1940	—	Hurricane	vicinity of Lille	2	31 May 1940	15:40	Spitfire	west of Dunkirk
1	29 May 1940	18:10	Spitfire	west of Dunkirk	3	2 June 1940	09:25	Spitfire	Dunkirk
– 9. Staffel of Jagdgeschwader 26 "Schlageter" – Action at the Channel and over England — 26 June – 21 August 1940
4	8 August 1940	12:34	Spitfire	west of Canterbury	7	18 August 1940	13:55	Hurricane	Canterbury
5	8 August 1940	12:35	Hampden	south of Ramsgate	8	18 August 1940	13:55	Hurricane	Canterbury
6	12 August 1940	12:30? (Note: According to Mathews and Foreman claimed at 18:55.)	Spitfire	Folkestone	9	18 August 1940	13:56	Hurricane	Canterbury
—	14 August 1940	13:30	Hurricane	Folkestone-Dover	10	18 August 1940	13:56	Hurricane	Canterbury
– Stab III. Gruppe of Jagdgeschwader 26 "Schlageter" – Action at the Channel and over England — 21 August – 21 June 1941
11	22 August 1940	20:25	Spitfire	southeast of Dover	17	9 September 1940	18:07	Spitfire	Thames Estuary
12	28 August 1940	10:10	Defiant	east of Canterbury	18	9 September 1940	18:11	Spitfire	Thames Estuary
13	31 August 1940	10:00	Spitfire	Braintree	— ? (Note: This unconfirmed claim is not listed by Prien, Stemmer, Rodeike and Bock.)	11 September 1940	17:30	Blenheim	
14	1 September 1940	15:00	Spitfire	London	19? (Note: This claim is not listed by Caldwell.)	28 September 1940	10:45	Spitfire	north of Dungeness
— ?	6 September 1940	10:30	Hurricane	Dungeness	20	29 October 1940	17:45	Hurricane	
15	7 September 1940	18:45	Spitfire	London	21	1 November 1940	15:35	Spitfire	Herne Bay
16	9 September 1940	18:05	Spitfire	Thames Estuary	22	17 June 1941	19:40	Hurricane	
– Stab III. Gruppe of Jagdgeschwader 26 "Schlageter" – On the Western Front — 22 June – 5 December 1941
23	23 June 1941	20:30	Blenheim	10 km (6.2 mi) north of Dunkirk	30	9 August 1941	11:45	Spitfire	east of Marquise
24	27 June 1941	17:05	Hurricane		31	9 August 1941	17:59	Spitfire	
25	28 June 1941	08:50	Spitfire	Audruicq	32	21 August 1941	10:18	Spitfire	
26	2 July 1941	12:50	Spitfire	south of Lillers	33	21 September 1941	16:30	Spitfire	
27	11 July 1941	14:55	Spitfire		34	27 September 1941	15:30	Spitfire	
28	7 August 1941	11:40	Spitfire		35	27 November 1941	17:30	Hurricane	5 km (3.1 mi) west of Boulogne
29	7 August 1941	18:00	Spitfire	southwest of Dunkirk					
– Stab of Jagdgeschwader 26 "Schlageter" – On the Western Front — 1 January – 31 December 1942
—	24 March 1942	—	Spitfire	northern France	40	19 August 1942	18:30	Spitfire	Dieppe
— ? (Note: This unconfirmed claim is not listed by Caldwell nor by Mathews and Foreman.)	25 March 1942	—	Spitfire		— ?	8 November 1942	—	B-17	
36	28 March 1942	18:30	Spitfire		— ?	8 November 1942	—	B-17	
37	14 April 1942	18:33	Spitfire	10 km (6.2 mi) north of Sangatte	— ?	6 December 1942	—	B-17	
38	1 June 1942	13:55	Spitfire		— ? (Note: This unconfirmed claim is not listed by Caldwell nor by Prien, Stemmer, Rodeike and Bock.)	20 December 1942	—	B-17	
39	19 August 1942	16:31	Spitfire	Dieppe					

=== Awards ===
- Iron Cross (1939) 2nd and 1st Class
- Knight's Cross of the Iron Cross on 11 September 1940 as Hauptmann and Gruppenkommandeur of the III./Jagdgeschwader 26 "Schlageter"
- German Cross in Gold on 9 December 1941 as Hauptmann in the III./Jagdgeschwader 26

== Notes ==
Military offices
Preceded by Oberst Adolf Galland	Commander of Jagdgeschwader 26 Schlageter; 6 December 1941 – 10 January 1943	Succeeded by Major Josef Priller
Preceded by Generalmajor Carl-August Schumacher	Commander of Jagdfliegerführer Norwegen; 18 January 1944 – May 1944	Succeeded by Oberstleutnant Günther Scholz
Preceded by Hauptmann Walther Dahl	Commander of Jagdgeschwader z.b.V. 6 June 1944 – 15 June 1944	Succeeded by Stab/Jagdgeschwader 4
Preceded by none: unit renamed	Commander of Jagdgeschwader 4; 15 June 1944 – 6 August 1944	Succeeded by Oberleutnant Gerhard Michalski
Preceded by none: new command	Commander of Jagdfliegerführer Ungarn; August 1944 – 7 January 1945	Succeeded by none: command disbanded
Preceded by Major Gerhard Barkhorn	Commander of Jagdgeschwader 6 Horst Wessel; 10 April 1945 – 17 April 1945	Succeeded by Major Richard Leppla
