= Jagdgeschwader z.b.V. =

- Active: 20 April 1944 – 15 June 1944
- Country: Nazi Germany
- Branch: Luftwaffe
- Type: Fighter Aircraft
- Role: Air superiority
- Size: Air Force Wing

Commanders
- Notable commanders: Gerhard Schöpfel (6.6.44 – 15.6.44)

Jagdgeschwader z. b. V. (JG z. b. V.) (roughly 'Fighter Wing for special deployment') was a Luftwaffe fighter wing of World War II. The abbreviation z. b. V. is German and stands for zur besonderen Verwendung (for special deployment).

The Geschwaderstab (headquarters unit) of JG z.b.V. was initially formed on 31 October 1943 for a period of three months under control of Jagdfliegerführer Ostmark, controlling day-time fighter operations in this area of operations.

JG z.b.V. was again formed 20 April 1944 in Kassel, to control III./JG 3, I./JG 5, II./JG 27, III./JG 54 and II./JG 53. On June 15, 1944 it was redesignated Stab/JG 4 and its first Geschwaderkommodore was Major Gerhard Michalski. In 1944 JG z. b. V. was subordinated to the 7. Jagd-Division and used in the Reichsluftverteidigung (Defense of the Reich) from bases in Kassel and Ansbach.

== Commanding officers ==
- Major Gerhard Michalski, 20 April 1944 – 20 May 1944
- Hauptmann Walther Dahl, 20 May 1944 – 6 June 1944
- Major Gerhard Schöpfel, 6 June 1944 – 15 June 1944
