= Wilhelm Moritz =

German fighter ace and Knight's Cross recipient (1913–2007)

- Born: 29 June 1913; Altona, Hamburg, German Empire
- Died: 28 June 2007 (aged 93); Ontario, Canada
- Military career
- Allegiance: Nazi Germany
- Branch: German Army (1933–1935); Luftwaffe (1935–1945)
- Service years: 1933–1945
- Rank: Major (major)
- Units: ZG 1, JG 77, JG 1, JG 51, JG 3, JG 4
- Commands: 6./JG 77, 11./JG 1, 12./JG 51; IV./JG 3, II./JG 4
- Conflicts: See battles World War II: Invasion of Poland; Eastern Front; Defense of the Reich
- Awards: Knight's Cross of the Iron Cross

Wilhelm Moritz (29 June 1913 – 28 June 2007) was a German Luftwaffe military aviator and fighter ace during World War II. He is credited with 44 aerial victories achieved in over 500 combat missions. This figure includes 28 aerial victories on the Eastern Front, and further 16 victories over the Western Allies, including 12 four-engined bombers.

Born in Hamburg, Moritz joined the military service of the Wehrmacht in 1933 and later transferred to the Luftwaffe. Posted to Zerstörergeschwader 1 (ZG 1—1st Destroyer Wing), he flew his first combat missions during the Invasion of Poland. Transferred to Jagdgeschwader 77 (JG 77—77th Fighter Wing), Moritz claimed his first aerial victory on 6 July 1940. In November 1940, he was appointed Staffelkapitän (squadron leader) of 6. Staffel (6th squadron) of JG 77. In April 1944, Moritz was appointed Gruppenkommandeur (group commander) of IV. Sturmgruppe (assault group) of Jagdgeschwader 3 "Udet" (JG 3—3rd Fighter Wing). The Sturmgruppe was a specialized unit flying the heavily armored variant of the Focke-Wulf Fw 190 against the United States Army Air Forces (USAAF) heavy bomber formations. In July 1944, Moritz was awarded the Knight's Cross of the Iron Cross in recognition for his leadership of the Sturmgruppe in combating the USAAF bombers. After World War II, he moved to Ontario in Canada where he died on 28 June 2007.

== Career ==
Moritz was born on 29 June 1913 in Altona, a borough of Hamburg in the German Empire. He volunteered for military service in the Wehrmacht of Nazi Germany in 1933. Initially serving in the Army, he transferred to the Luftwaffe (air force) in September 1939.

== World War II ==
World War II in Europe began on Friday 1 September 1939 when German forces invaded Poland. During this campaign, Moritz flew missions on the Messerschmitt Bf 110 heavy fighter with II. Gruppe (2nd group) of Zerstörergeschwader 1 (ZG 1—1st Destroyer Wing). The Gruppe was under command of Major Hellmuth Reichardt and based at an airfield at Frankfurt (Oder). On the first day of the invasion, II. Gruppe escorted bombers from II. Gruppe of Kampfgeschwader 26 (KG 26—26th Bomber Wing) in their attack on the Polish airfields near Poznań.

In mid-1940, Moritz was posted to the II. Gruppe of Jagdgeschwader 77 (JG 77—77th Fighter Wing) which at the time was based in Norway and commanded by Hauptmann Karl Hentschel. There, he was assigned to the 4. Staffel (4th squadron) headed by Hauptmann Helmut Henz which was based at Trondheim-Værnes. Moritz claimed his first aerial victory on 6 July 1940 when he shot down a Royal Air Force (RAF) Bristol Blenheim bomber west of Stavanger He shot down another RAF Blenheim bomber on 19 August followed by a Bristol Beaufort torpedo bomber on 26 October. In November 1940, Moritz succeeded Hauptmann Theodor Cammann as Staffelkapitän (squadron leader) of 6. Staffel of JG 77. On 10 November, II. Gruppe was withdrawn from Norway and began relocation to France. In France, the Gruppe was based at Brest-Süd Airfield, also known as Brest Guipavas Airfield, where they patrolled the French Atlantic coast. In January 1941, Moritz was posted to the Jagdfliegerschule 4, the fighter pilot school at Fürth Airfield.

In March 1942, IV. Gruppe of Jagdgeschwader 1 (JG 1–1st Fighter Wing) was re-designated and became the III. Gruppe of Jagdgeschwader 5 (JG 5—5th Fighter Wing). In consequence, Hauptmann Fritz Losigkeit was charged with the creation of a new IV. Gruppe which was initially based at Werneuchen near Berlin. Oberleutnant Friedrich Eberle headed 10. Staffel which had already served as 3. Staffel of Jagdgruppe Losigkeit. The Einsatzstaffel of Jagdfliegerschule 4 under Moritz formed 11. Staffel on 3 April. Oberleutnant Franz Eisenach initially led 12. Staffel created from some pilots of the former IV. Gruppe. Command of 12. Staffel then passed on to Oberleutnant Heinz Stöcker. On 10 September, Moritz was transferred to the Gruppenstab (headquarters unit) of IV. Gruppe of Jagdgeschwader 51 "Mölders" (JG 51—51st Fighter Wing). He was replaced by Oberleutnant Rainer Framm as commander of 11. Staffel of JG 1.

=== Eastern Front ===
At the time of his posting to JG 51, IV. Gruppe was based at Novodugino, north of Vyazma on the Eastern Front, and fighting in the Battle of Rzhev. The commander of the Gruppe was Hauptmann Johann Knauth. In October 1942, Moritz was given command of 12. Staffel of JG 51. He succeeded Oberleutnant Egon Falkensamer who was transferred. When on 11 July 1943, Major Rudolf Resch, then commander of IV. Gruppe, was killed in action, Moritz temporarily took command of the Gruppe until Major Hans-Ekkehard Bob officially took command of the Gruppe on 1 August.

In October 1943, Moritz was transferred to Jagdgeschwader 3 "Udet" (JG 3—3rd Fighter Wing) where he was given command of 6. Staffel. In consequence, command of 12. Staffel of JG 51 was passed to Leutnant Rudolf Wagner.

=== Defense of the Reich ===
On 15 April 1944, Generalmajor Adolf Galland, at the time the General der Jagdflieger (General of Fighters), visited IV. Gruppe of JG 3 at the airfield in Salzwedel. At the time, Moritz served with Gruppenstab of IV. Gruppe. Galland announced that the IV. Gruppe would be converted to a Sturmgruppe (assault group), the first of such units, as a means to combat the bomber formations of the United States Army Air Forces (USAAF). Similar to the experimental Sturmstaffel 1 (1st Assault Squadron) of JG 3, the Gruppe was equipped with the heavily armored variant of the Focke-Wulf Fw 190 A series. Every pilot of the Gruppe was asked to sign a contract, declaring that they would commit themselves to pressing attacks on the bombers to point-blank range, and that aerial ramming should be considered. Three days later, Moritz was officially appointed Gruppenkommandeur (group commander) of the IV. Sturmgruppe of JG 3. He replaced Hauptmann Heinz Lang, who had temporarily led the Gruppe after its former commander, Major Friedrich-Karl Müller was appointed Geschwaderkommodore (wing commander) on 11 April.

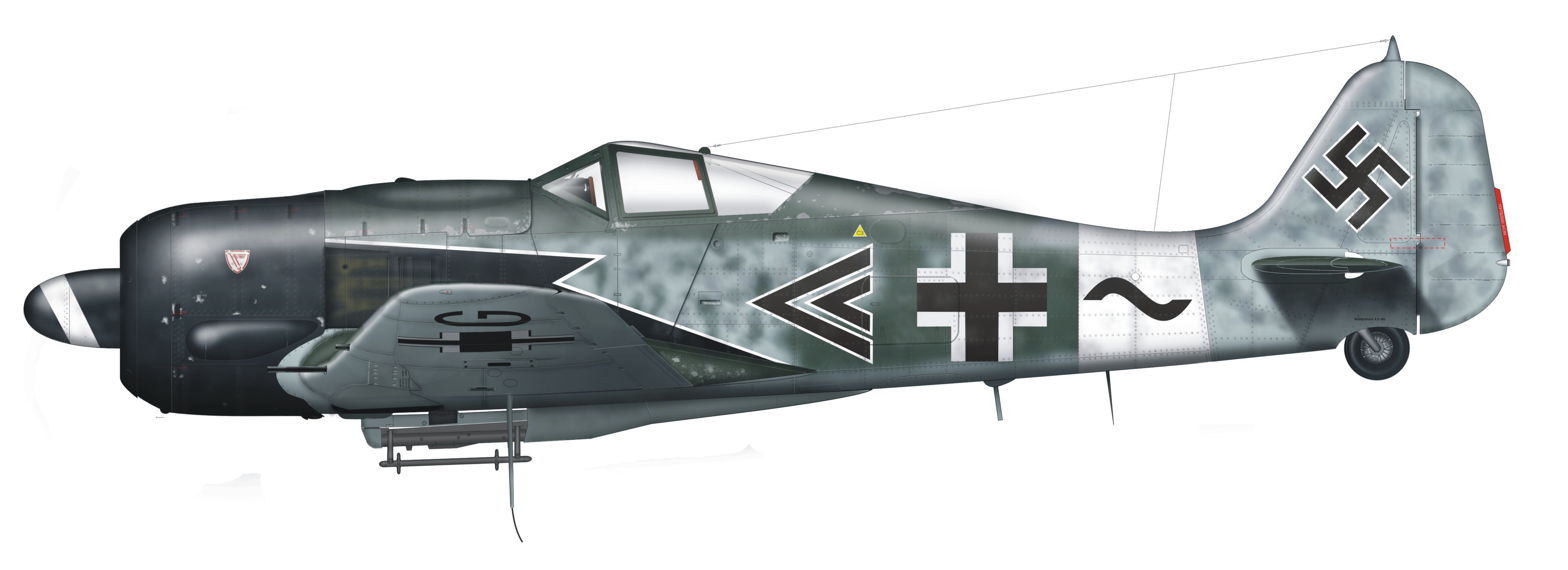
Focke-Wulf Fw 190 A-8/R8 of IV.(Sturm)/JG 3 "Udet", flown by Hauptmann Moritz

Moritz claimed his first aerial victory in Defense of the Reich on 22 April when 803 bombers of the USAAF Eighth Air Force targeted various German transportation targets in western Germany, in particular the railroad classification yard in Hamm. IV. Gruppe was scrambled at 18:20 in Salzwedel and engaged Consolidated B-24 Liberator bombers from the 2nd Air Division at 19:40 in a 20 minute aerial battle during which Moritz shot down one of the B-24 bombers. On 29 April, 679 USAAF bombers, escorted by 814 fighters, headed von Berlin to bomb the capital. IV. Gruppe flew two missions to defend against this attack. On the second mission, the Gruppe intercepted the bombers on their return from the target area at 13:20 in the vicinity of Gardelegen. In this encounter, Moritz claimed an Herausschuss (separation shot)—a severely damaged heavy bomber forced to separate from his combat box which was counted as an aerial victory—over a B-24 bomber.

Combat box of a 12-plane B-17 squadron. Three such boxes completed a 36-plane group box.: 1. Lead Element; 2. High Element; 3. Low Element; 4. Low Low Element

On 6 July, VI. Gruppe relocated to Illesheim Airfield located 18 kilometers (11 miles) northeast of Rothenburg ob der Tauber. The following day, a force of 1,129 B-17 Flying Fortresses and B-24 Liberators of the USAAF Eighth Air Force set out from England to bomb aircraft factories in the Leipzig area and the synthetic oil plants at Boehlen, Leuna-Merseburg and Lützkendorf. This formation was intercepted by a German Gefechtsverband (combat formation) consisting of IV. Sturmgruppe of JG 3, led by Hauptmann Moritz, escorted by two Gruppen of Bf 109s from Jagdgeschwader 300 (JG 300—300th Fighter Wing) led by Major Walther Dahl. Dahl and Moritz drove the attack to point-blank range behind the Liberators of the 492d Bombardment Group before opening fire. 492d Bombardment Group was temporarily without fighter cover. Within about a minute the entire squadron of twelve B-24s had been annihilated. The Germans claimed 28 USAAF 2nd Air Division B-24s that day and were credited with at least 21. The majority to the Sturmgruppe attack. This event, also known as the Luftschlacht bei Oschersleben (aerial battle at Oschersleben), earned both Dahl and Moritz a reference in the Wehrmachtbericht, an information bulletin issued by the headquarters of the Wehrmacht, on 8 July. Moritz was awarded the Knight's Cross of the Iron Cross (Ritterkreuz des Eisernen Kreuzes) on 18 July for 39 aerial victories, including six Herausschüsse.

On 19 November, IV. Gruppe was ordered to an airfield at Stömede, located approximately 11 kilometers (6.8 miles) south of Lippstadt. The plan was to consolidate all three Gruppen of JG 3 in northwestern Germany which were subordinated to the 3. Jagd Division (3rd Fighter Division) commanded by Generalmajor Walter Grabmann. On the afternoon of 26 November, JG 3 was ordered to take off to attack Allied fighter bombers. Weather conditions were adverse at Störmede, visibility less than 1,000 meters (3,300 feet), and cloud cover was down at 75 meters (246 feet). While I. Gruppe lost its commander in a takeoff accident, Moritz aircraft got stuck in the mud during taxiing. The mission ended in a fiasco for JG 3 and Moritz was threatened with court-martial. To avoid legal prosecution, Major Heinz Bär, the Geschwaderkommodore of JG 3, had Moritz transferred to IV. Gruppe of Ergänzungs-Jagdgeschwader 1 (EJG 1), a Luftwaffe replacement training unit. Moritz left JG 3 on 5 December and was replaced by Hauptmann Hubert-York Weydenhammer. He ended the war as commander of II. Gruppe of Jagdgeschwader 4 (JG 4—4th Fighter Wing).

== Later life ==
Moritz died on 28 June 2007 at the age of 93 in Ontario, Canada.

== Summary of career ==
=== Aerial victory claims ===
Mathews and Foreman, authors of Luftwaffe Aces — Biographies and Victory Claims, researched the German Federal Archives and found records for 41 aerial victory claims, plus three further unconfirmed claims. This figure includes 28 aerial victories on the Eastern Front and 13 over the Western Allies, including nine four-engined bombers.

Victory claims were logged to a map-reference (PQ = Planquadrat), for example "PQ 07671". The Luftwaffe grid map (Jägermeldenetz) covered all of Europe, western Russia and North Africa and was composed of rectangles measuring 15 minutes of latitude by 30 minutes of longitude, an area of about 360 square miles (930 km^{2}). These sectors were then subdivided into 36 smaller units to give a location area 3 km × 4 km (1.9 mi × 2.5 mi) in size.

Chronicle of aerial victories
This and the ♠ (Ace of spades) indicates those aerial victories which made Moritz an ace-in-a-day, a term which designates a fighter pilot who has shot down five or more airplanes in a single day. This and the – (dash) indicates unwitnessed aerial victory claims for which Moritz did not receive credit. This along with the * (asterisk) indicates an Herausschuss (separation shot)—a severely damaged heavy bomber forced to separate from his combat box which was counted as an aerial victory. This and the ? (question mark) indicates information discrepancies listed by Prien, Stemmer, Rodeike, Bock, Mathews and Foreman.
Claim	Date	Time	Type	Location	Claim	Date	Time	Type	Location
– 4. Staffel of Jagdgeschwader 77 – Norway — 6 April – 10 November 1940
1	6 July 1940	07:01	Blenheim	west of Stavanger	3	26 October 1940	16:52	Beaufort	southwest of Bergen
2	19 August 1940	14:47	Blenheim						
– 12. Staffel of Jagdgeschwader 51 – Eastern Front — September 1942
— ? (Note: This unconfirmed claim is not listed by Prien, Stemmer, Rodeike and Bock.)	26 September 1942	—	unknown		— ?	27 September 1942	—	unknown	
– Stab IV. Gruppe of Jagdgeschwader 51 – Eastern Front — October – 8 December 1942
4	30 October 1942	09:35	Il-2	south-southeast of Surazh	6	8 December 1942	12:45	Il-2	18 km (11 mi) north of Velikiye Luki
5	3 December 1942	13:50	Il-2	25 km (16 mi) southeast of Velikiye Luki	7	8 December 1942	12:50	Il-2	15 km (9.3 mi) north of Velikiye Luki
– 12. Staffel of Jagdgeschwader 51 – Eastern Front — December 1942 – 3 February 1943
8	16 December 1942	10:03	Il-2	PQ 07671	10	17 December 1942	11:47	Il-2	PQ 07594 vicinity of Glazunovka
9	17 December 1942	07:48	Il-2	17 km (11 mi) southwest of Velikiye Luki	11	7 January 1943	11:15	Il-2	PQ 07751
– 12. Staffel of Jagdgeschwader 51 – Eastern Front — 4 February – 31 December 1943
12	10 April 1943	12:55	R-Z? (Note: According to Mathews and Foreman claimed as a Polikarpov R-5.)	PQ 35 Ost 46773; 15 km (9.3 mi) east of Vyazma	22♠	13 July 1943	14:15	Il-2	PQ 35 Ost 63252; 15 km (9.3 mi) southeast of Zalegoshch
13	8 May 1943	18:10	P-39	PQ 35 Ost 63582; 20 km (12 mi) southwest of Maloarkhangelsk	23	15 July 1943	16:40	Il-2	PQ 35 Ost 64824; 15 km (9.3 mi) southeast of Mtsensk
14	10 May 1943	06:35	La-5	PQ 35 Ost 72131 vicinity of Cheremisnowo	24	5 August 1943	17:30	La-5	southeast of Karachev
15	5 July 1943	07:25	LaGG-3	PQ 35 Ost 53883; 20 km (12 mi) southwest of Fatezh	25	12 August 1943	17:40	LaGG-3	north of Orvodowka
16	10 July 1943	10:35	MiG-3	PQ 35 Ost 63554; 15 km (9.3 mi) west of Maloarkhangelsk	26	16 August 1943	06:15	LaGG-3	east-southeast of Bohodukhiv
17	10 July 1943	10:40	MiG-3	PQ 35 Ost 63514; 10 km (6.2 mi) east of Trosna	27	20 August 1943	06:30	Il-2 m.H. (Note: The "m.H." refers to an Ilyushin Il-2 with rear gunner (mit Heckschütze).)	northwest of Ulitschewka
18♠	13 July 1943	11:15	Yak-1	PQ 35 Ost 64883; 15 km (9.3 mi) northeast of Zalegoshch	28	27 August 1943	09:12	Il-2 m.H.	southwest of Kotelva
19♠	13 July 1943	13:48	Il-2	PQ 35 Ost 63242; 10 km (6.2 mi) south of Zalegoshch	29	19 September 1943	08:15	Il-2 m.H.	northwest of Sajzewo
20♠	13 July 1943	13:52	Il-2	PQ 35 Ost 63241; 10 km (6.2 mi) south of Zalegoshch	30	4 October 1943	10:48	Yak-1	northwest of Klushino
21♠	13 July 1943	14:00	LaGG-3	PQ 35 Ost 63251; 15 km (9.3 mi) southeast of Zalegoshch	31	4 October 1943	13:03	Pe-2	southwest of Nowy-Orlik
– Stab IV. Gruppe of Jagdgeschwader 3 "Udet" – Defense of the Reich — 18 April – 31 May 1944
32	22 April 1944	19:46	B-24	PQ 05 Ost S/NQ-OQ; Westerwald, southeast of Bonn	35	8 May 1944	10:14	B-24*	PQ 15 Ost S/FA-9, northwest of Braunschweig
33	29 April 1944	13:20	B-24*	PQ 15 Ost S/FC-EC northwest of Gardelegen	36	13 May 1944	14:16	B-17*	PQ 15 Ost S/AF, Lake Kummerow
34	8 May 1944	10:07	B-24*	PQ 15 Ost S/FA north of Braunschweig	37	13 May 1944	14:24	B-17*	PQ 15 Ost S/AF, Lake Kummerow
– Stab IV. Gruppe of Jagdgeschwader 3 "Udet" – Defense of the Reich — July – December 1944
38	7 July 1944	09:42	B-24*	PQ 15 Ost S/HC, Oschersleben	41? (Note: According to Mathews and Foreman this claim is unconfirmed.)	27 September 1944	—	B-24	
39	18 July 1944	10:50	B-17	Kempten	42? (Note: This claim is not listed by Mathews and Foreman.)	2 November 1944	12:47	B-17	PQ 15 Ost JB/JC/JD/KC/KD
40	23 August 1944	12:20	B-24	PQ 15 Ost S/FL-FM; Mürzzuschlag	43? (Note: This claim is not listed by Prien.)	28 November 1944	13:52	P-51	

=== Awards ===
- Iron Cross (1939) 2nd and 1st Class
- Honor Goblet of the Luftwaffe on 11 October 1943 as Hauptmann and Staffelkapitän
- German Cross in Gold in 1945 as Major in the IV./Jagdgeschwader 3
- Knight's Cross of the Iron Cross on 18 July 1944 as Major and Gruppenkommandeur of IV./Jagdgeschwader 3 "Udet" (Note: According to Scherzer as Gruppenkommandeur of the IV.(Sturm)/Jagdgeschwader 3 "Udet".)

== Notes ==
Military offices
Preceded by Hauptmann Heinz Lang	Commander of IV. Gruppe of Jagdgeschwader 3; 18 April 1944 – 5 December 1944	Succeeded by Hauptmann Hubert-York Weydenhammer
Preceded by Major Rudolf Schröder	Commander of I. Gruppe of Jagdgeschwader 4 March 1945 – 8 May 1945	Succeeded by None
