= Fritz Dinger =

German World War II fighter pilot (1915–1943)

- Born: 20 August 1915; Ottweiler
- Died: 27 July 1943 (aged 27); Scalea, Italy
- Military career
- Allegiance: Nazi Germany
- Branch: Luftwaffe
- Service years: 1939–1943
- Rank: Oberleutnant (first lieutenant)
- Unit: JG 53
- Commands: 4./JG 53
- Conflicts: World War II: Battle of France; Battle of Britain; Operation Barbarossa; Siege of Malta; Defense of the Reich
- Awards: Knight's Cross of the Iron Cross

Fritz Dinger (20 August 1915 – 27 July 1943) was born into an aristocratic German family. Fritz enlisted into the German Luftwaffe in 1939 and would later end up becoming an ace. Fritz was a recipient of the Knight's Cross of the Iron Cross during World War II. The Knight's Cross of the Iron Cross, and its variants were the highest awards in the military and paramilitary forces of Nazi Germany during World War II.

== Career ==
Dinger was born on 20 August 1915 in Ottweiler in the Kingdom of Prussia within the German Empire. Following flight and fighter pilot training, (Note: Flight training in the Luftwaffe progressed through the levels A1, A2 and B1, B2, referred to as A/B flight training. A training included theoretical and practical training in aerobatics, navigation, long-distance flights and dead-stick landings. The B courses included high-altitude flights, instrument flights, night landings and training to handle the aircraft in difficult situations.) Dinger was posted to the 4. Staffel (4th squadron) of Jagdgeschwader 53 (JG 53—53rd Fighter Wing). At 14:45 on 16 August 1940 during the Battle of Britain, Dinger was shot down in aerial combat with the Royal Air Force (RAF) and crashed his Messerschmitt Bf 109 E-1 into the sea in a location 50 kilometers (31 miles) south of Cherbourg.

The bulk of the Geschwader's air elements were moved via Jever, in northern Germany, to Mannheim-Sandhofen on 8 June 1941. There the aircraft were given a maintenance overhaul prior to moving east. The II. Gruppe was transferred to Neusiedel in East Prussia, present-day Malomožaiskojė in Kaliningrad Oblast in Russia, between 12–14 June.

=== Operation Barbarossa ===
On 22 June the Geschwader crossed into Soviet airspace in support of Operation Barbarossa, the invasion of the Soviet Union which opened the Eastern Front.

Following aerial combat on 5 October 1941, Dinger made a forced landing in his Messerschmitt Bf 109 F-4 (Werknummer 7187—factory number) at Sologubovka, located 70 kilometers (43 miles) southeast of Saint Petersburg. That day, his unit had flown its final missions in the area of Shlisselburg. The Gruppe then relocated to the Western Front where it arrived at Leeuwarden in the Netherlands on 12 October. While based at Leeuwarden, Dinger claimed his twelfth aerial victory when he shot down a RAF Bristol Blenheim bomber on 27 October. On 2 December 1941, II. Gruppe moved to the Mediterranean theater and where then based at Comiso airfield during the siege of Malta.

=== Squadron leader and death ===
In October 1942, Dinger was transferred to take command of 4. Staffel of JG 53. He succeeded Oberleutnant Wilhelm Hobirk who had led the Staffel for two months after its former commander, Oberleutnant Gerhard Michalski had been transferred in August. Dinger was awarded the Knight's Cross of the Iron Cross (Ritterkreuz des Eisernen Kreuzes) on 23 December 1942 for 49 aerial victories claimed.

On an early morning mission flown on 27 July 1943, Dinger claimed his 67th aerial victory. Following this mission, the airfield at Scalea came under an Allied bombing attack. Dinger was hit in the back of his head by shrapnel, killing him instantly. In consequence, Hauptmann Willi Krauss replaced him as commander of 4. Staffel.

== Summary of career ==
=== Aerial victory claims ===
According to US historian David T. Zabecki, Dinger was credited with 67 aerial victories. Obermaier also list him with 67 aerial victories, 41 of which on the Eastern Front and 25 over the Western Allies in the Mediterranean theater, claimed in over 600 combat missions. Mathews and Foreman, authors of Luftwaffe Aces — Biographies and Victory Claims, researched the German Federal Archives and found documentation for 64 aerial victory claims. This number includes 37 claims on the Eastern Front and 27 over the Western Allies, including one four-engined heavy bomber.

Victory claims were logged to a map-reference (PQ = Planquadrat), for example "PQ 49442". The Luftwaffe grid map (Jägermeldenetz) covered all of Europe, western Russia and North Africa and was composed of rectangles measuring 15 minutes of latitude by 30 minutes of longitude, an area of about 360 square miles (930 km^{2}). These sectors were then subdivided into 36 smaller units to give a location area 3 km × 4 km (1.9 mi × 2.5 mi) in size.

Chronicle of aerial victories
This and the # (hash mark) indicates those aerial victories listed by Prien, Stemmer, Rodeike and Bock without an explicit sequence number. This and the ? (question mark) indicates information discrepancies listed by Prien, Stemmer, Rodeike, Balke, Bock, Mathews and Foreman.
Claim	Date	Time	Type	Location	Claim	Date	Time	Type	Location
– 4. Staffel of Jagdgeschwader 53 – Operation Barbarossa — 22 June – 4 October 1941
#	4 July 1941	16:46	SB-3		#	7 July 1941	10:45? (Note: According to Mathews and Foreman claimed at 10:46.)	SB-3	
#	4 July 1941	16:48	SB-3		#	10 July 1941	09:03	SB-3	
According to Prien, Stemmer, Rodeike and Bock, Dinger claimed two undocumented aerial victories in the timeframe 22 June to 10 October 1941. These two claims are not listed by Mathews and Foreman.
6	25 August 1941	13:42	I-18 (MiG-1)		9	29 August 1941	18:46	I-16	
7	29 August 1941	15:57	I-16? (Note: According to Mathews and Foreman claimed as a Mikoyan-Gurevich MiG-1.)		11	28 September 1941	16:09	Pe-2	
8	29 August 1941	16:22	V-11 (Il-2)						
– 4. Staffel of Jagdgeschwader 53 – Netherlands — 12 October – 15 December 1941
12	27 October 1941	15:08	Blenheim	6 km (3.7 mi) northwest of Texel					
– 4. Staffel of Jagdgeschwader 53 – Mediterranean Theater — 25 November 1941 – July 1942
13	22 February 1942	12:05	Hurricane		16	7 July 1942	06:56	Spitfire	
14	22 April 1942	10:30	Hurricane		17	10 July 1942	10:41	Spitfire	
15	15 June 1942	18:25	Spitfire	50 km (31 mi) southwest of Gozo	18	13 July 1942	13:30	Spitfire	5–10 km (3.1–6.2 mi) south of Kalafrana
? (Note: This claim is not listed by Prien, Stemmer, Rodeike and Bock.)	2 July 1942	07:48	Spitfire	15 km (9.3 mi) northeast of La Valletta					
– Stab I. Gruppe of Jagdgeschwader 53 – Eastern Front — August – 27 September 1942
19	18 August 1942	17:23	Il-2	west of Schintow					
According to Prien, Stemmer, Rodeike and Bock, Dinger claimed two undocumented aerial victories in the timeframe August to September 1942. These two claims are not listed by Mathews and Foreman.
#	19 August 1942	11:30	Pe-2	east of Kusserow	#	10 September 1942	14:03	LaGG-3	PQ 49442; 20 km (12 mi) southeast of Stalingrad
#	19 August 1942	11:31	LaGG-3? (Note: According to Mathews and Foreman claimed as a Lavochkin La-5.)	east of Kusserow	#	11 September 1942	14:43	Yak-1	5 km (3.1 mi) northeast Kotluban train station
#	19 August 1942	17:47	Il-2	PQ 40774; 25 km (16 mi) northwest of Gumrak	#	13 September 1942	06:40	I-180 (Yak-7)	PQ 49432; 35 km (22 mi) east of Stalingrad
#	21 August 1942	17:30	LaGG-3	PQ 4074; 35 km (22 mi) north-northwest of Gumrak	#	13 September 1942	06:58	I-180 (Yak-7)	PQ 49273; 10 km (6.2 mi) east of Stalingrad
#	25 August 1942	11:06	MiG-1	PQ 49252; 25 km (16 mi) east of Stalingrad	#	15 September 1942	09:36	Il-2	PQ 49243; 10 km (6.2 mi) northeast of Stalingrad
#	30 August 1942	08:11	I-180 (Yak-7)	PQ 49533; 30 km (19 mi) south of Stalingrad	#	15 September 1942	09:37	Il-2	PQ 49212; 10 km (6.2 mi) east of Stalingrad
#	30 August 1942	08:58	Il-2	PQ 49164 vicinity of Grebenka	#	16 September 1942	09:45	La-5	PQ 4945; 30 km (19 mi) southeast of Stalingrad
#	30 August 1942	09:00	Il-2	PQ 49162 vicinity of Grebenka	#	23 September 1942	06:40	La-5	PQ 4072; 35 km (22 mi) north of Grebenka
#	31 August 1942	09:00	Il-2	PQ 49473; 30 km (19 mi) south-southeast of Stalingrad	#	23 September 1942	16:40	Yak-1	PQ 4064; 55 km (34 mi) north-northeast of Grebenka
#	3 September 1942	09:43	Il-2	PQ 49422; 25 km (16 mi) east of Stalingrad	#	24 September 1942	07:06	MiG-1	PQ 4075; 30 km (19 mi) north of Gumrak
#	3 September 1942	15:10	Yak-1	PQ 40701; 40 km (25 mi) north of Gumrak	46	25 September 1942	10:48? (Note: According to Mathews and Foreman claimed at 10:49.)	MiG-1	PQ 4924; 10 km (6.2 mi) northeast of Stalingrad
#	6 September 1942	10:15? (Note: According to Mathews and Foreman claimed at 10:11.)	LaGG-3	PQ 5933; 55 km (34 mi) east of Stalingrad	47	25 September 1942	10:52	Il-2	PQ 4087
#	7 September 1942	11:24	Il-2	PQ 40751; 30 km (19 mi) north of Gumrak	48	25 September 1942	16:32	Yak-1	PQ 4052; 65 km (40 mi) north of Gumrak
#	7 September 1942	15:54	Il-2	PQ 40782; 20 km (12 mi) north of Gumrak					
– 4. Staffel of Jagdgeschwader 53 – Mediterranean Theater — October 1941 – 31 December 1942
49	16 October 1942	08:25	Spitfire	3–5 km (1.9–3.1 mi) east of Żonqor Tower	52	4 December 1942	15:52	Boston	30 km (19 mi) southwest of Mateur
50	4 December 1942	11:31	P-38	2 km (1.2 mi) south Ferryville	53	5 December 1942	12:31? (Note: According to Mathews and Foreman claimed at 12:30.)	B-25	10 km (6.2 mi) west of Cap Blanc
51	4 December 1942	15:50	Boston	30 km (19 mi) southeast of Mateur					
– 4. Staffel of Jagdgeschwader 53 – Mediterranean Theater — 1 January – 27 July 1943
54	22 March 1943	13:55	Boston	PQ 13 Ost 0873; Cape San Vito	61	7 July 1943	17:18	P-40	35 km (22 mi) west of Marsala
55	5 April 1943	09:13	P-38	40 km (25 mi) north of Zembra; 40 km (25 mi) north of Feccabra	62	8 July 1943	12:25	B-17	20 km (12 mi) south of Agrigento
56	18 April 1943	19:02	P-40	10 km (6.2 mi) southwest of Ras el Almas	63	8 July 1943	16:18	P-40	west of Sciacca
57	19 April 1943	15:57	Spitfire	10 km (6.2 mi) west of Zembra	64	9 July 1943	07:43	P-40	3 km (1.9 mi) north-northeast of Sciacca
58	25 April 1943	13:59	Spitfire	30 km (19 mi) south of Hammamet	65? (Note: This claim is not listed by Mathews and Foreman.)	18 July 1943	07:45	Spitfire	Catania
?	22 May 1943	18:44	Spitfire		66	24 July 1943	12:55	B-26	30 km (19 mi) northeast of Stromboli
59	4 June 1943	07:56	Spitfire	20 km (12 mi) north of La Valetta	67	27 July 1943	09:25	P-40	2 km (1.2 mi) east of Cesarò
60	6 July 1943	15:22	Spitfire	1 km (0.62 mi) west Pozallo					

=== Awards ===
- Iron Cross (1939) 2nd and 1st Class
- Honor Goblet of the Luftwaffe on 26 October 1942 as Leutnant and pilot
- German Cross in Gold on 5 November 1942 as Leutnant in the I./Jagdgeschwader 53 "Pik As"
- Knight's Cross of the Iron Cross on 23 December 1942 as Oberleutnant and Staffelführer of the 4./Jagdgeschwader 53
