= Jagdfliegerführer Ungarn =

Jagdfliegerführer Ungarn was formed July 1944 in Budapest, subordinated to I. Jagdkorps. The headquarters was located at Wien-Kobenzl. The unit was disbanded on January 7, 1945.

== Commanding officers ==
=== Fliegerführer ===
- Major Gerhard Schöpfel, August 1944 - January 1945
