= George Noel Keith =

Canadian flying ace

George Noel Keith DFC
- Born: January 19, 1921; Cardston, Alberta
- Died: 4 August 1943 (aged 22); Mediterranean Sea
- Burial place: Agira Canadian War Cemetery, Sicily
- Military career
- Allegiance: Canada; United Kingdom
- Branch: Royal Canadian Air Force; Royal Air Force
- Service years: 1940 – 1943
- Rank: Flying Officer
- Nickname: 'Moose'
- Service number: J/15374
- Conflicts: World War II; European Theatre; Siege of Malta; Operation Husky; North Africa Campaign
- Awards: Distinguished Flying Cross

Flying Officer George Noel Keith DFC (19 January 1921 – 4 August 1943) was a Second World War Canadian fighter pilot and flying ace.

== Biography ==
Keith was born in Cardston, Alberta on 19 January 1921. He moved with his parents to live in Taber, Alberta. He enlisted in the Royal Canadian Air Force (RCAF) in Calgary on 16 October 1940, aged 19.

== Service career ==
In 1941, Keith trained as a pilot via the British Commonwealth Air Training Plan. He graduated from the Initial Training School in late January 1941, and then attended the Elementary Flying Training School in March. He graduated from Service Flying Training School in June 1941 and was posted overseas, joining No. 402 "City of Winnipeg" Squadron RCAF where he flew the Hurricane IIB, until changing to Spitfire VBs during the Dieppe Raid in August 1942.

=== North Africa ===
He was commissioned as a Pilot Officer in May, 1942 and posted to the Mediterranean theatre in January, 1943 and joined No. 72 Squadron in March, 1943, based in Tunisia. On 3 April, Keith was credited with his first confirmed victory, shooting down a German Messerschmitt Bf 109 fighter. The next month, on 6 May, he claimed two Bf 109s destroyed and one probably destroyed.

=== Malta ===
In June 1943 Keith moved with his squadron to Malta in anticipation of the Allied landings on Sicily. Keith claimed his fourth Bf 109 (that of Major Gerhard Michalski, commander of 2 Squadron, JG 53) on 18 June 1942 whilst on an offensive sweep over Comiso airfield in southern Sicily.

On 11 July Keith destroyed his fifth and sixth enemy aircraft, an Italian Macchi C.200 and a German Junkers Ju 88. With these victories Keith became a fighter ace. On 12 July Keith shot down another Ju 88 and later in the claimed a Bf 109 probably destroyed. The following day Keith claimed one Bf 109 destroyed and one shared. These would be his last claims of the war, bringing his totals to 8.5 destroyed (1 shared), 2 probably destroyed, and 2 damaged. It seems that he was recommended for a decoration after the events of 12 July. His Distinguished Flying Cross (DFC) citation reads as follows:

Flying Officer Keith is a fine section leader, whose skill and determination have been outstanding. He has destroyed seven enemy aircraft in recent operations.

— London Gazette, No. 36165, 10 September 1943

== Death ==
While strafing ground targets on 4 August 1943, Keith's Supermarine Spitfire Mk V was struck by anti-aircraft fire and he was forced to bale out near Sicily at 2,000 feet (600 m), but the tailplane of the Spitfire struck him and broke both his legs. His parachute did not open until 300 feet (100 m) and he landed in the sea. He was picked up quickly by air-sea rescue but died of his injuries shortly after.

Keith is buried at the Agira Canadian War Cemetery in Sicily.
