= Walther Dahl =

German fighter pilot during World War II (1916–1985)

- Born: 27 March 1916; Lug, Germany
- Died: 25 November 1985 (aged 69); Heidelberg
- Military career
- Allegiance: Nazi Germany
- Branch: Luftwaffe
- Service years: 1935–1945
- Rank: Oberst (colonel)
- Nickname: Rammdahl
- Units: JG 3, JG 300, EJG 2
- Commands: JG 300
- Conflicts: See battles World War II: Eastern Front; Defense of the Reich
- Awards: Knight's Cross of the Iron Cross with Oak Leaves

Walther Dahl (27 March 1916 – 25 November 1985) was a German pilot and a fighter ace during World War II. He was a recipient of the Knight's Cross of the Iron Cross with Oak Leaves of Nazi Germany. Dahl claimed some 128 enemy aircraft shot down in 678 missions.

== Early life and career ==
Dahl was born on 27 March 1916 in Lug near Bad Bergzabern, son of a Volksschule teacher who was killed in action in 1918 on the Western Front of World War I. He joined the military service on 29 October 1935, initially serving as a Schütze with Infanterie-Regiment 35 before transferring to Infanterie-Regiment 119 in Stuttgart on 6 October 1936. On 18 January 1938, Dahl was promoted to Leutnant (second lieutenant) of the Reserves with an effective date as of 1 January 1938.

On 28 October 1938, Dahl quit his service with the Heer (army) and joined the Schutzpolizei (police) on 29 October 1938. On 1 May 1939, Dahl resigned and joined the Luftwaffe (air force) and was trained as a pilot. (Note: Flight training in the Luftwaffe progressed through the levels A1, A2 and B1, B2, referred to as A/B flight training. A training included theoretical and practical training in aerobatics, navigation, long-distance flights and dead-stick landings. The B courses included high-altitude flights, instrument flights, night landings and training to handle the aircraft in difficult situations.) From December 1939 he trained at the flight school in Weimar. On 1 October 1940, Dahl was promoted to Oberleutnant (first lieutenant) and was then posted to the fighter pilot school Jagdfliegerschule 5 in Wien-Schwechat on 31 October.

== World War II ==
World War II in Europe had begun on Friday, 1 September 1939, when German forces invaded Poland. On 30 April 1941, Dahl was posted to the Ergänzungsgruppe (a training unit) of Jagdgeschwader 3 (JG 3—3rd Fighter Wing). At the time, the Ergänzungsgruppe was based at Krakau, now Kraków, and commanded by Major Alfred Müller.

In May 1941, Dahl was then transferred to the Geschwaderstab (headquarters unit) of JG 3 under command of Major Günther Lützow. The Geschwaderstab had just received the then new Messerschmitt Bf 109 F-2 at Mannheim-Sandhofen Airfield and was based at an airfield near Saint-Pol-Brias on the English Channel.

=== War against the Soviet Union ===
In preparation for Operation Barbarossa, the German invasion of the Soviet Union, the Geschwaderstab began heading east on 8 June 1941. They stopped for several days at Breslau-Gandau (now in Wrocław, Poland. On 18 June, the Geschwaderstab relocated to Hostynne, from where on 22 June 1941, Lützow led JG 3 in combat against the Soviet Union. At the start of the campaign, JG 3 was subordinated to the V. Fliegerkorps (5th Air Corps), under command of General der Flieger Robert Ritter von Greim, which was part of Luftflotte 4 (4th Air Fleet), under command of Generaloberst Alexander Löhr. These air elements supported Generalfeldmarschall Gerd von Rundstedt's Heeresgruppe Süd (Army Group South), with the objective of capturing Ukraine and its capital Kiev.

On 22 June the first day of the invasion, Dahl flew with the Gruppenstab of II. Gruppe (2nd group) of JG 3. Flying against Soviet airfields in the Lviv area, Dahl was credited with II. Gruppe's first aerial victory when he claimed an I-18 fighter, an early German designation for a Mikoyan-Gurevich MiG-1 fighter, at 04:30.

Dahl commanded 4. Staffel of JG 3 from 13 February until 9 April 1942 as Staffelkapitän (squadron leader). He had taken over command from Hauptmann Georg Michalek who was transferred. When Dahl was ordered to take over command of 1. Staffel of Ergänzungsgruppe Süd, he passed command of 4. Staffel of JG 3 to Oberleutnant Gerhard Walz. On 20 July 1943, Dahl was given command as Gruppenkommandeur (group commander) of III. Gruppe of JG 3. He replaced Hauptmann Karl-Heinz Langer who was one of the temporary leaders of the Gruppe after its former commander Hauptmann Wolfgang Ewald became a prisoner of war on 14 July. On 11 March 1944, Dahl was awarded the Knight's Cross of the Iron Cross (Ritterkreuz des Eisernen Kreuzes) for 64 aerial victories claimed.

=== Wing commander ===
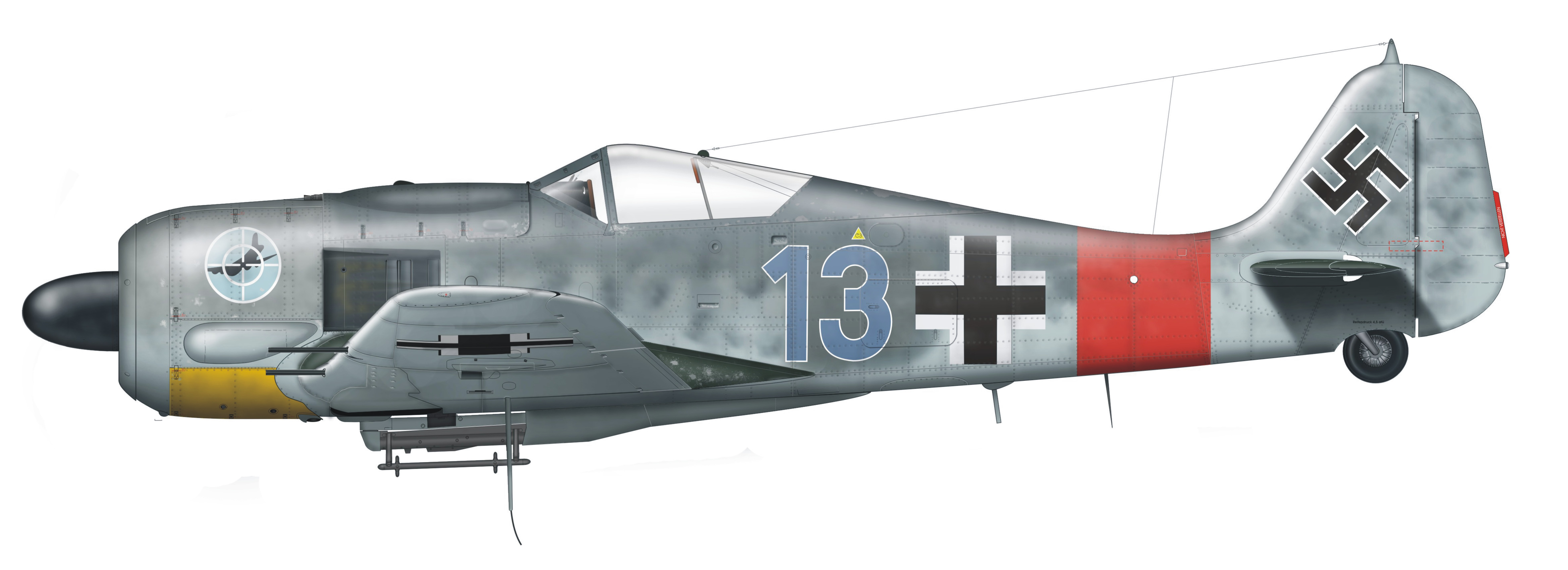
Fw 190 A-8/R2 flown by Major Walter Dahl, CO of IV.(Sturm)/JG 300

On 21 May 1944, Dahl was appointed commander of Jagdgeschwader zur besonderen Verwendung (JG z.b.V.—a special purpose fighter wing). He led the unit until taking command of Jagdgeschwader 300 (JG 300—300th Fighter Wing) on 27 June 1944. Dahl set up his Geschwaderstab at Ansbach, planning combined operations with JG 3 "Udet". Dahl succeeded Major Walter Brede as commander of JG 300. Command of III. Gruppe of JG 3 was then passed to Major Karl-Heinz Langer.

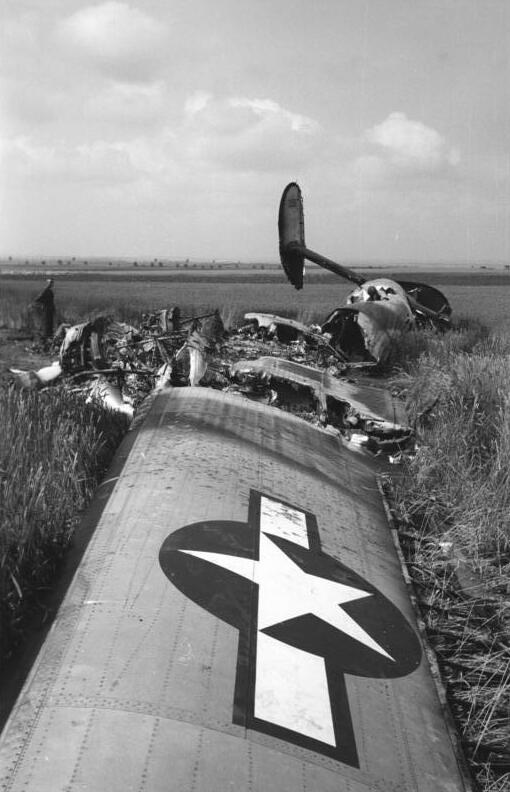
shot down Consolidated B-24 Liberator of the 492d Bombardment Group after the aerial battle at Oschersleben on 7 July 1944

On 7 July 1944, a force of 1,129 B-17 Flying Fortresses and B-24 Liberators of the United States Army Air Forces (USAAF) Eighth Air Force set out from England to bomb aircraft factories in the Leipzig area and the synthetic oil plants at Boehlen, Leuna-Merseburg and Lützkendorf. This force was divided into three prongs. The first group consisted of 373 B-24s, the second force of the 3rd Bomb Division was made up of 303 B-17s, and the third wave was made up of 450 B-17s. A series of accidents at the start of the mission allowed the Luftwaffe to focus their attacks on the B-24 force. This formation was intercepted by a German Gefechtsverband (task force) consisting of IV.(Sturm) Gruppe Jagdgeschwader 3 escorted by two Gruppen of Bf 109s from JG 300 led by Dahl. Dahl drove the attack to point-blank range behind the Liberators of the 492nd Bomb Group before opening fire. 492nd Bomb Group was temporarily without fighter cover. Within about a minute the entire squadron of twelve B-24s had been annihilated. The Germans claimed 28 USAAF 2nd Air Division B-24s that day and were credited with at least 21. The majority to the Sturmgruppe attack, IV./JG 3 lost nine fighters shot down and three more suffered damage and made crash landings; five of the unit's pilots were killed. On this mission, Dahl was credited with his 72nd aerial victory, a B-24 shot down in the vicinity of Quedlinburg.

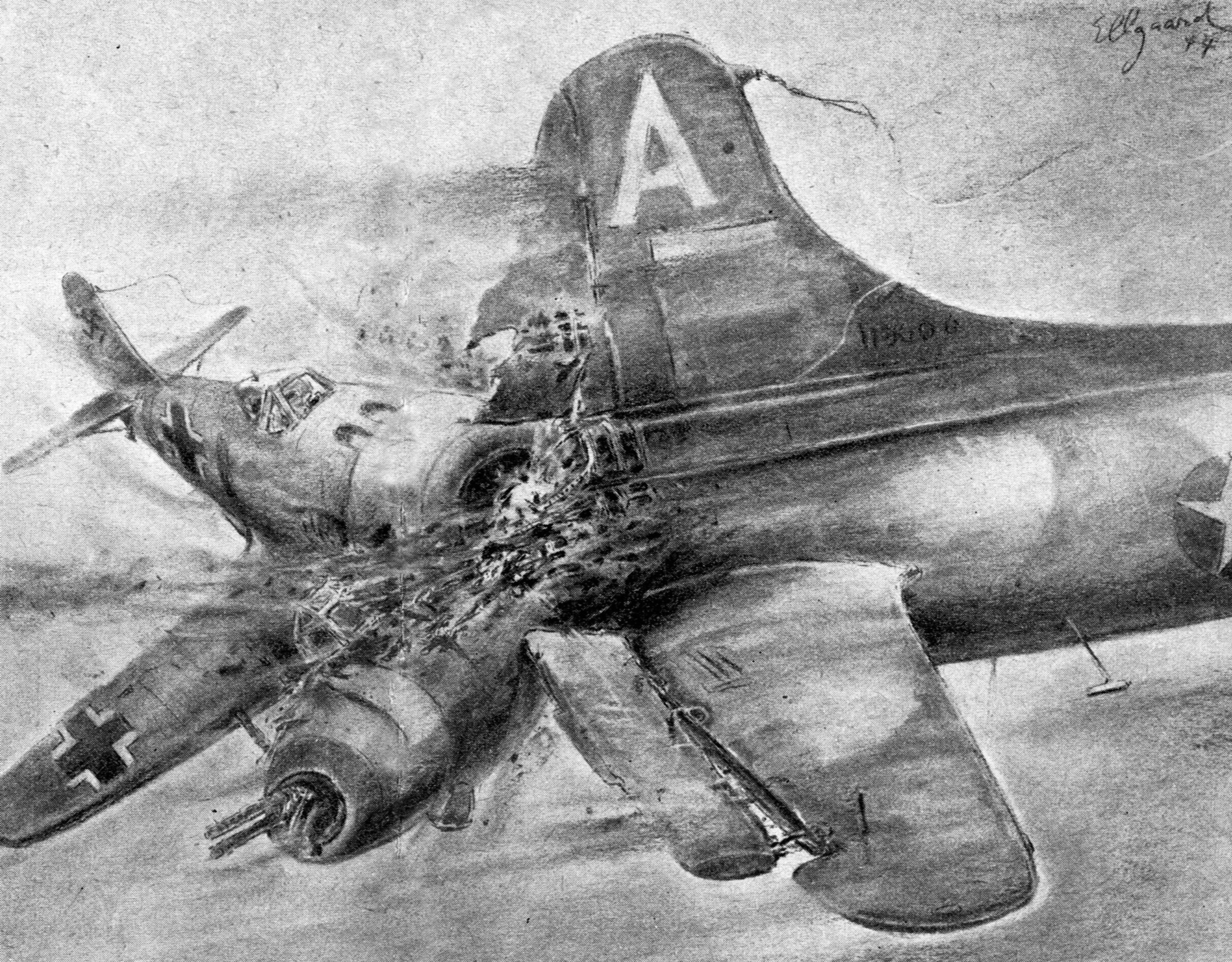
A 1944 drawing by Helmuth Ellgaard illustrating "ramming"

On 13 September, Dahl claimed to have brought down a B-17 four-engined bomber by ramming according to his own account. Lorant and Goyat, the historians of JG 300, found no evidence of a corresponding loss in US archives.

On 26 January 1945, Hermann Göring appointed him Inspekteur der Tagjäger (Inspector of the Day Fighters). Despite his promotion, Dahl continued to fly operationally. On 28 February 1945, Dahl was credited with his 100th aerial victory. He was the 98th Luftwaffe pilot to achieve the century mark.

Dahl ended the war flying the Messerschmitt Me 262 jet fighter with III./Ergänzungs-Jagdgeschwader 2 (a supplementary fighter unit). On 27 March 1945, Dahl claimed two P-47 Thunderbolt fighter kills. His 129th and last victory was a USAAF P-51 Mustang near Dillingen an der Donau on 26 April 1945. Dahl was promoted to Oberst (colonel) on 30 April 1945. He was taken prisoner of war by US forces in Bavaria at the end of World War II in Europe.

== Later life ==
Following the war, Dahl became a member of the Deutsche Reichspartei (DRP—German Reich Party) In the West German federal election of 1961 he unsuccessfully ran as a candidate for the DRP. On 8 May 1961, Dahl founded the "Reichsverband der Soldaten" (RdS—lit. "Reich Association of Soldiers"). Among others, the founding meeting was attended by Adolf von Thadden and Erich Kern, the honorary president was Hans-Ulrich Rudel. It was planned that the RdS youth program was to be organized in the Bund Vaterländischer Jugend (Coalition of the Patriotic Youth), a group which was banned that same year due to its radical right-wing affiliation.

Dahl was married to Regina Dahl, a journalist with the National Zeitung, a weekly extreme right newspaper published by Gerhard Frey. Dahl was a spokesman for the German People's Union, a nationalist political party founded by Frey. In 2004, Frey and Hajo Herrmann published an abstract of Dahl's biography in the book Helden der Wehrmacht – Unsterbliche deutsche Soldaten [Heroes of the Wehrmacht – Immortal German soldiers]. This publication was classified as a far-right wing publication by Claudia Fröhlich and Horst-Alfred Heinrich. Dahl died on 25 November 1985 of heart failure in Heidelberg.

== Publications ==
- Rammjäger: Bericht über seine Kriegserlebnisse 1943 bis 1945 (in German). Pour le Mérite Verlag ISBN 3-932381-01-7 (2000).

== Summary of career ==
=== Aerial victory claims ===
According to US historian David T. Zabecki, Dahl was credited with 129 aerial victories. Spick lists him with 128 aerial victories claimed in 678 combat missions. This figure includes 77 claims on the Eastern Front, and 51 on the Western Front, 36 of them being four-engined bombers and a mission-to-claim ratio of 4.69. Mathews and Foreman, authors of Luftwaffe Aces — Biographies and Victory Claims, researched the German Federal Archives and state that he claimed at least 90 aerial victories, at least 56 of which claimed on the Eastern Front and more than 34 on Western Front, including over 22 four-engined bombers, plus further 13 unconfirmed claims. He claimed seven victories flying the Me 262. The claim that he is attributed with 128 aerial victories cannot be verified through the archives.

Victory claims were logged to a map-reference (PQ = Planquadrat), for example "PQ 49283". The Luftwaffe grid map (Jägermeldenetz) covered all of Europe, western Russia and North Africa and was composed of rectangles measuring 15 minutes of latitude by 30 minutes of longitude, an area of about 360 square miles (930 km^{2}). These sectors were then subdivided into 36 smaller units to give a location area 3 km × 4 km (1.9 mi × 2.5 mi) in size.

Chronicle of aerial victories
This and the – (dash) indicates unconfirmed aerial victory claims for which Dahl did not receive credit. This along with the * (asterisk) indicates an Herausschuss (separation shot)—a severely damaged heavy bomber forced to separate from his combat box which was counted as an aerial victory. This and the ? (question mark) indicates information discrepancies listed by Prien, Stemmer, Rodeike, Bock, Mathews and Foreman.
Claim	Date	Time	Type	Location	Claim	Date	Time	Type	Location
– Stab II. Gruppe of Jagdgeschwader 3 "Udet" – Operation Barbarossa — 22 June – 5 December 1941
1	22 June 1941	04:30	I-18 (MiG-1)	east of Lemberg	10? (Note: According to Mathews and Foreman, this claim is unconfirmed.)	14 September 1941	06:05	I-153	Jelesawetowka
2	16 July 1941	15:45? (Note: According to Mathews and Foreman claimed at 05:45.)	I-16	south of Koziatyn	11	19 September 1941	13:57	SB-3	Kotschubjewka
3?	1 August 1941	13:00	I-16	Kiev	12	11 October 1941	11:55	SB-3	20 km (12 mi) northeast of Gzhatsk
4?	8 August 1941	13:30	DB-3	east of Majewo	13	18 October 1941	10:10	I-16	northwest of Oschtiwschtschi
5	24 August 1941	08:55	I-180 (Yak-7)	south of Zaporizhia	14	19 October 1941	15:25	I-16	northwest of Ischum
6	24 August 1941	15:55	I-16	Dnipropetrovsk	15	23 October 1941	10:56	I-61 (MiG-3)	southeast of Kurman-Kemeltschij
7?	13 September 1941	09:30	I-16	south of Miropol	16	23 October 1941	11:00	I-61 (MiG-3)	northeast of Kurman-Kemeltschij
8	13 September 1941	17:20	Il-2	east of Belabtyn	17	23 October 1941	11:20	I-16	southeast of Jogaili
9	13 September 1941	17:27	V-11 (Il-2)	east of Paschetolowka					
– 4. Staffel of Jagdgeschwader 3 "Udet" – Mediterranean Theater — 7 January – 26 April 1942
—	2 April 1942	15:30	Spitfire	10 km (6.2 mi) north of Malta					
– Stab of Jagdgeschwader 3 "Udet" – Eastern Front — 19 May 1942 – 3 February 1943
18	26 August 1942	08:37? (Note: According to Mathews and Foreman claimed at 08:57.)	Yak-7	northwest of Stalingrad	31	25 October 1942	10:20	LaGG-3	8 km (5.0 mi) south of Stalingrad
19	7 September 1942	15:36? (Note: According to Mathews and Foreman claimed at 15:56.)	La-5	PQ 49283, southwest of Akhtuba; 10 km (6.2 mi) east of Stalingrad	32	25 October 1942	10:39	Il-2	8 km (5.0 mi) east-northeast of Krasnoarmeysk
20	19 September 1942	11:44	Yak-7	2 km (1.2 mi) south of Kotluban train station 1 km (0.62 mi) east-northeast of Kotluban	33	25 October 1942	14:21	Il-2	9 km (5.6 mi) east of Stalingrad
21	24 September 1942	11:03	Yak-1	northern edge of Stalingrad	34	26 October 1942	14:02	Il-2	10 km (6.2 mi) northwest of Stalingrad
22	24 September 1942	11:09	Yak-1	southeast of Dubovka	35	26 October 1942	14:07	Il-2	10 km (6.2 mi) southwest of Beketowka
23	27 September 1942	16:03	Il-2	northern edge of Stalingrad	36	26 October 1942	14:08	Il-2	12 km (7.5 mi) southwest of Beketowka
24	29 September 1942	10:17	Il-2	north-northwest of Stalingrad	37	26 October 1942	14:12	Il-2	12 km (7.5 mi) southwest of Sarepta
25	30 September 1942	16:10	Il-2	15 km (9.3 mi) southeast of Akhtuba	38	27 October 1942	10:00	Yak-1	12 km (7.5 mi) east of Krasnaya Sloboda
26	30 September 1942	16:15	P-40	20 km (12 mi) southeast of Dubovka	39	30 November 1942	08:10	Il-2	8 km (5.0 mi) north of Pitomnik Airfield
27	30 September 1942	16:16	P-40	25 km (16 mi) southeast of Dubovka	40	30 November 1942	08:12	Il-2	west of Kotluban train station
28	14 October 1942	07:07	Il-2	20 km (12 mi) northwest of Stalingrad	41	30 November 1942	13:25	Yak-1	6 km (3.7 mi) southwest of Beketowka
29	14 October 1942	07:15	Il-2	25 km (16 mi) northwest of Stalingrad	42	2 December 1942	09:10	Il-2	10 km (6.2 mi) northeast of Kotluban train station
30	17 October 1942	09:15	Yak-1	50 km (31 mi) northeast of Stalingrad					
– Stab of Jagdgeschwader 3 "Udet" – Eastern Front — 4 February – 10 May 1943
43	16 March 1943	14:25	Boston	PQ 34 Ost 8044, east of Tarsowka	48	16 April 1943	15:10	P-39	northwest of Krymskaya over sea, south of Gelendzhik
44	21 March 1943	14:55	LaGG-3	PQ 34 Ost 9887, south of Rostov	49	16 April 1943	15:10? (Note: According to Mathews and Foreman claimed at 15:15.)	P-39	Krymskaja; Black Sea, 20 km (12 mi) northwest of Anapa
45	15 April 1943	16:28	LaGG-3	PQ 34 Ost 85147, northwestern edge of Abinskaya	50	17 April 1943	15:08? (Note: According to Mathews and Foreman claimed at 15:05.)	LaGG-3	PQ 34 Ost 85191, east of Abinskaya over sea, southeast of Gelendzhik
46	15 April 1943	16:30	LaGG-3	PQ 34 Ost 8544, south of Abinskaya; Nowy Swet	51	17 April 1943	15:08? (Note: According to Mathews and Foreman claimed at 15:06.)	LaGG-3	PQ 34 Ost 85191, east of Abinskaya over sea, southeast of Gelendzhik
47	16 April 1943	15:08	P-39	northwest of Krymskaya					
– Stab III. Gruppe of Jagdgeschwader 3 "Udet" – Defense of the Reich — 8 August – 31 December 1943
52?	6 September 1943	11:15	B-17*	PQ 05 Ost S/BR-4, Achern	55	14 October 1943	14:35	B-17*	PQ 05 Ost S/QU, east of Frankfurt; Aschaffenburg-Würzburg
53	6 September 1943	11:30	B-17	12 km (7.5 mi) west of Saint-Avold	56	19 December 1943	12:25	B-17	south of Innsbruck
54	14 October 1943	14:30	B-17	PQ 05 Ost S/QU; Aschaffenburg-Würzburg					
– Stab III. Gruppe of Jagdgeschwader 3 "Udet" – Defense of the Reich — 1 January – 6 June 1943
57	29 January 1944	11:07	B-17	Kaiserslautern; Mannheim/Bastogne	65	25 February 1944	12:27? (Note: According to Mathews and Foreman claimed at 12:25.)	B-17	Mühldorf
58?	29 January 1944	11:13	B-17*	Saarbrücken-Kaiserslautern; Mannheim/Bastogne	66	25 February 1944	12:48	B-17	20–30 km (12–19 mi) southwest of Regensburg
59?	23 February 1944	12:08	B-24	east of Wels	67	13 April 1944	15:04	B-17	30 km (19 mi) northwest of Augsburg
60?	23 February 1944	12:12	B-24*	southwest of Steyr	68	13 April 1944	15:08	B-17*	30 km (19 mi) west of Augsburg
61	23 February 1944	12:20	P-38	southeast of Steyr	69	24 April 1944	13:30	B-17	Augsburg
62?	24 February 1944	13:12	B-17*	southeast of Steyr	70	24 April 1944	13:36	B-17	PQ 04 Ost S/CE-6, northeast of Munich
63?	24 February 1944	13:12	B-17*	southeast of Steyr	71	24 April 1944	13:45	P-51	Munich
64	24 February 1944	13:20	P-38	30 km (19 mi) southeast of Steyr					
– Stab of Jagdgeschwader 300 – Defense of the Reich — 27 June – 16 September 1944
72	7 July 1944	09:45	B-24	PQ LC4-5/7-8, north of Quedlinburg	75	11 September 1944	11:55	B-17	PQ LD-KD-KE-LE, Schafstädt/Könnern/Bitterfeld/Halle-Leipzig
73	15 August 1944	11:45	B-17	PQ PO-QO, Blankenheim-Kelberg/Büdesheim-Hasborn	76	11 September 1944	12:05	B-17	PQ LD-MD-KC-KD, Schafstädt-Naumburg/Königsrode-Könnern
74	15 August 1944	11:46	B-17	PQ PP-PO-QO, Blankenheim-Kelberg/Büdesheim-Hasborn					
– Stab of Jagdgeschwader 300 – Defense of the Reich — 17 September 1944 – February 1945
77	28 September 1944	12:45	B-17	PQ HB-HA, Schöppenstedt-Salzgitter vicinity of Wolfenbüttel	87	29 January 1945	10:04	Il-2	20 km (12 mi) east of Oppeln
78	6 October 1944	12:05	B-17	PQ FF-FG-GF, Nauen-Berlin-Brandenburg	88	29 January 1945	10:10	La-7	25 km (16 mi) east of Oppeln
79	7 October 1944	12:35	P-51	PQ HG, vicinity of Luckenwalde	89	30 January 1945	11:55	B-17	vicinity of Berlin
80	26 October 1944	14:10	B-17	PQ SG	90	30 January 1945	12:00	P-51	vicinity of Berlin
81	5 November 1944	12:05	B-17	vicinity of Leipzig	91	31 January 1945	11:15	P-51	vicinity of Berlin
82	5 December 1944	12:15	B-17	vicinity of Berlin	92	4 February 1945	14:00	P-38	vicinity of Berlin
83	5 December 1944	12:25	B-17	vicinity of Berlin	93	20 February 1945	10:45	La-7	20 km (12 mi) east of Stargard
84	5 December 1944	13:00	P-51	vicinity of Berlin	94	21 February 1945	09:30	Il-2	5 km (3.1 mi) west of Platho
85	27 January 1945	10:08	La-7	20 km (12 mi) west of Wieluń	95	21 February 1945	09:35	Il-2	5 km (3.1 mi) west of Platho
86	28 January 1945	11:00	Il-2	30 km (19 mi) south of Kalisz					
– III. Gruppe of Ergänzungs-Jagdgeschwader 2 – Defense of the Reich — March – April 1945
96	27 March 1945	—	P-47	vicinity of Lechfeld	100	20 April 1945	—	P-51	
97	27 March 1945	—	P-47	vicinity of Lechfeld	101	26 April 1945	—	P-51	west of Munich
98	9 April 1945	—	Unknown		102	26 April 1945	—	P-51	vicinity of Dillingen
99	19 April 1945	—	Unknown						

=== Awards ===
- Iron Cross (1939) 2nd and 1st Class
- Honor Goblet of the Luftwaffe on 5 January 1942 as Oberleutnant and pilot (Note: According to Obermaier on 23 December 1941.)
- German Cross in Gold on 2 December 1942 as Oberleutnant in the Stab/JG 3
- Knight's Cross of the Iron Cross with Oak Leaves
  - Knight's Cross on 11 March 1944 as Major and Gruppenkommandeur of the III./Jagdgeschwader 3 "Udet"
  - 724th Oak Leaves on 1 February 1945 as Major and Geschwaderkommodore of Jagdgeschwader 300

== Notes ==
Military offices
Preceded by Major Gerhard Michalski	Commander of Jagdgeschwader z.b.V. 20 May 1944 – 6 June 1944	Succeeded by Major Gerhard Schöpfel
Preceded by Oberstleutnant Kurd Kettner	Commander of Jagdgeschwader 300; 27 June 1944 – 26 January 1945	Succeeded by Major Kurd Peters
