= Jagdgeschwader 6 =

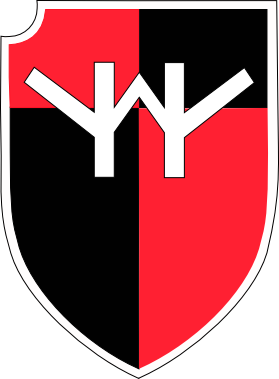
- Active: Late July 1944 – 8 May 1945
- Country: Nazi Germany
- Allegiance: Axis powers
- Branch: Air Force
- Type: Fighter Aircraft
- Role: Air superiority Offensive counter air Fighter-bomber
- Size: Air Force Wing
- Nickname(s): Horst Wessel
- Patron: Horst Wessel
- Battle honours: World War II

Commanders
- Notable commanders: Gerhard Barkhorn; Gerhard Schöpfel

Jagdgeschwader 6 (JG 6) Horst Wessel was a Luftwaffe fighter wing during World War II. Created late in the war as one of the last Jagdgeschwader, JG 6 fought on the Western and Eastern Fronts and in the Defence of the Reich over Germany. This period of the air war was characterised by few successes and heavy losses among the German fighter arm.

== Organisation ==
A Luftwaffe Geschwader (wing formation) was the largest homogenous flying formation. It typically was made up of three groups (gruppen). Each group contained approximately 30 to 40 aircraft in three squadrons (staffeln). A Jagdgeschwader could field 90 to 120 fighter aircraft. In some cases a wing could be given a fourth gruppe. Each wing had a Geschwaderkommodore (wing commander) supporting by three Gruppenkommandeur (Group Commanders). Each squadron was commanded by a Staffelkapitän (squadron leader). The staffel contained approximately 12 to 15 aircraft. The identification in records were different depending on the type of formation. A gruppe was referred to in roman numerals, for example I./JG 27, while staffeln were described with their number (1./JG 27). The wing could be subordinated to a Fliegerkorps, Fliegerdivision or Jagddivision (Flying Corps, Division and Fighter Division) all of which were subordinated to Luftflotten (Air Fleets). The use of Fliegerdivision became redundant and the description Fliegerkorps supplanted it until the use of Jagddivision later in the war.

=== Formation ===
The backdrop to JG 6 and its creation was a general deterioration of Germany's military position. In the air war, the Luftwaffe had been driven from North Africa in May 1943, and by the end of the year was largely absent from the Italian Campaign. The Combined Bomber Offensive had ground the Luftwaffe down severely in the first half of 1944. The Oberkommando der Luftwaffe had finally decided to abandon the cult of the offensive, and focus on the production of fighter aircraft. On the Eastern Front, the Luftwaffe had long since lost air superiority, from the Battle of Kursk in July 1943. Operation Bagration collapsed the front in June 1944, cleared the majority of Wehrmacht forces from the Soviet Union while on the Western Front, Operation Overlord and the Normandy landings were pushing the Germans out of France. Hugo Sperrle's Luftflotte 3 was bled white over Normandy.

The Stabstaffel, I and II Gruppen were established at Königsberg, part of an effort to increase the size of the single-engine fighter force in late July 1944. The gruppen were created from Zerstörergeschwader 26 (Heavy Fighter Wing 26) which had flown the Messerschmitt Bf 110 and Messerschmitt Me 410, then hopelessly vulnerable types in the era of long-range and numerous American fighter escorts. This reclassification ended the Zerstörergeschwader. Stab, I and II Gruppen ZG 26 became Stab, I and II Gruppen JG 6. Oberstleutnant Johann Kogler was appointed Geschwaderkommodore. I and III/JG 6 were formed in October and November 1944 leaving I Gruppe and Stabstaffel the only units available in August 1944. Hauptmann Willi Elstermann commanded II Gruppe. This gruppe converted to the Fw 190A-8 at Königsberg–Neumark.

== World War II ==
II Gruppe replaced some of the depleted German fighter units from Normandy. General der Jagdflieger Adolf Galland strongly objected to the move, which ultimately cost the gruppe 19 killed in action and four wounded in action in a short time. On 23 August 1944, it was ordered to Herpy near Reims. According to one member of the unit, Feldwebel Fritz Bucholz, who arrived with 11 hours of experience on single-engine fighters and no dogfighting experience, the airfield was nothing more than flat ground surrounded by trees to hide their aircraft. Tents were provided for shelter, and much attention was paid to camouflage. The gruppe used nearby cattle to roam the airfield while no flights were ongoing to obscure the tracks made by the landing gear and deceive Allied reconnaissance aircraft. The Normandy campaign was coming to an end, two days after their arrival Paris was liberated. Hauptmann Willi Elstermann led the gruppe in action towards the battle zone near St Quentin that day, 25 August.

Near Clastres, they observed Lockheed P-38 Lightnings from the US 394th Fighter Squadron strafing the airbase. In their first action, they shot down six of the P-38s. Distress calls summoned the P-38s from the 367th Fighter Group which lost one further P-38 but accounted for 16 of the gruppe fighters destroyed plus several more damaged. The two formations were numerically even, and the Focke-Wulf Fw 190 was more than a match for the P-38, but the Germans had little dogfighting experience. During the disastrous action, which cost the Gruppe half its strength, Leutnant Rudi Dassow, a 22-victory ace on the Bf 110 and Me 410, was killed. The following day the gruppe was in action again over the Seine area, and Fritz Bucholz was shot down. He was picked up by a Waffen SS rearguard and crossed the Seine by ferry. His wounds kept him out of action for six weeks. On his return, just four of the 40 pilots remained from the original cohort. The experience of II Gruppe JG 6 was repeated in many of the German fighter units over Normandy. Willi Elstermann was relieved of his command. The lack of tactical training on the Fw 190 contributed to the losses.

On 26 September 1944 III/ZG 26, which provided most of its personnel to Messerschmitt Me 262 unit ErprKdo 262, was renamed III Gruppe JG 6. The gruppe was committed to battle on 26 November as the US Eighth Air Force made a maximum effort in the Hannover area. The target of the 1st Bombardment Division and 2nd Bombardment Division targeted the Misburg hydrogenation plant. It flew as top cover for I and II/JG 1. JG 1 managed to dispatch three 91st Bombardment Group B-17 Flying Fortress bombers before the 356th Fighter Group reacted. JG 6 lost 12 Messerschmitt Bf 109s; six killed and six wounded. Their charges lost 15 Fw 190s, 12 killed and three wounded. The days fighting cost Luftflotte Reich 62 killed, 32 wounded and 122 fighters in exchange for 42 US bombers and 11 fighters; a ruinous loss rate.

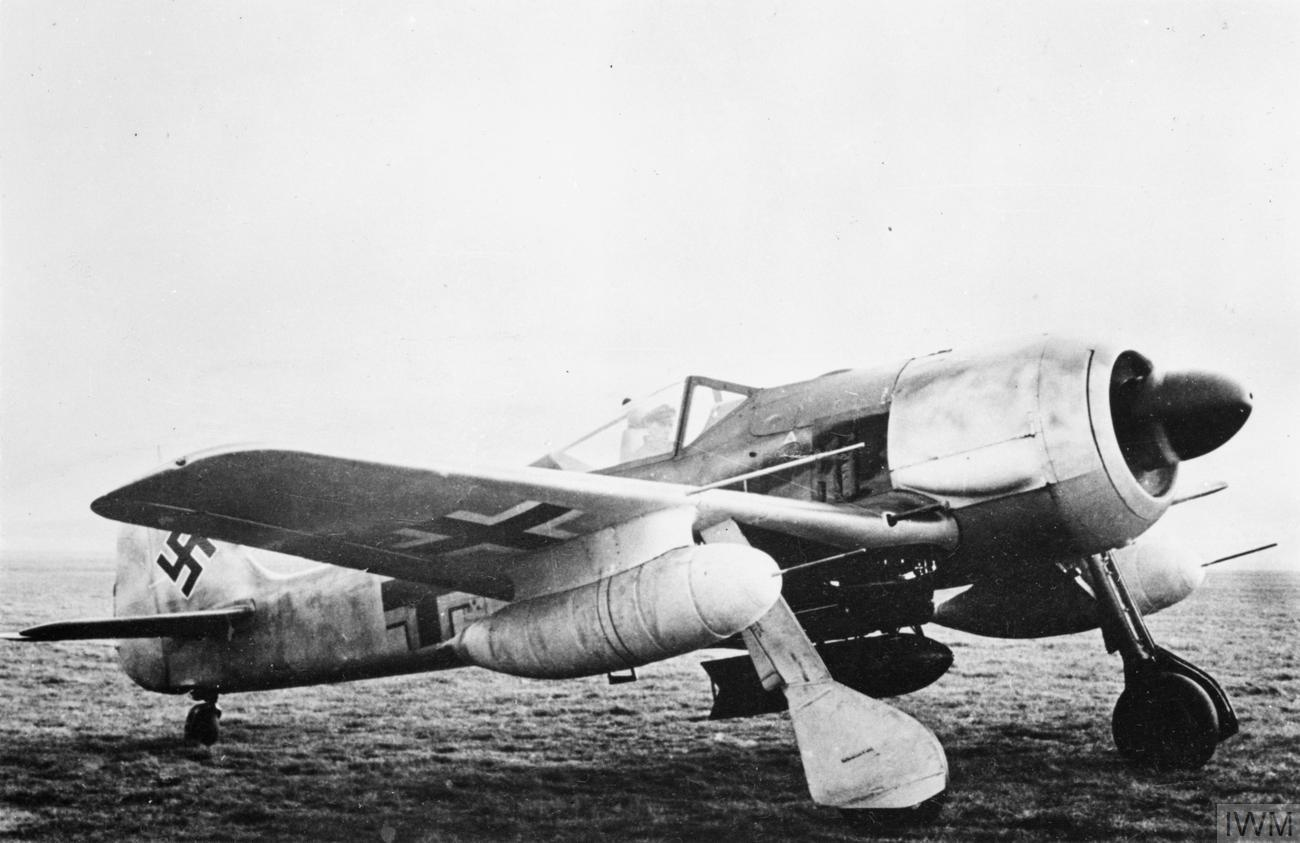
Fw 190 G-1 showing the ETC 250 bomb rack, carrying a 250 kg (550 lb) bomb, and the underwing 300 litre drop tanks JG 6 operated the Fw 190G-1 on 1 January 1945.

In December 1944, JG 6 was allocated to the Ardennes Offensive, Adolf Hitler's last gamble on the Western Front, designed to split the British Commonwealth and American armies by capturing Antwerp. On 14 December, east of Bonn, the II Jagdkorps organised a conference by Dietrich Peltz. Kogler attended and was surprised to hear that a bomber pilot and commander was to control fighter operations and the ambitious nature of the plans. Kogler briefed his Staffelkapitän and Gruppenkommandeure immediately, and provided detailed maps and plans for the Offensive counter air operation at Volkel airfield. He even went so far as to build a sand model of the airfield. This all-out air superiority attack was to be carried out by 1,100 German fighters before the Waffen SS and Wehrmacht forces advanced. The Luftwaffe commanders present were more hopeful for a German success than they had been in months; but the attack did not take place immediately. On 16 December 1944, the German offensive began under bad weather, holding off most of the Allied tactical air forces. On Christmas Eve, 1944, JG 6 joined I/JG 27 and JG 3 in anti-bomber missions over the front. A large air battle developed with P-51 Mustang groups protecting the bombers. Described as the "greatest air battle" of the offensive, JG 6 reported 13 pilots killed. JG 27 lost four pilots killed or missing, while JG 3 reported the loss of 20 pilots killed or missing. Later in the day two gruppen were in action with elements of the RAF Second Tactical Air Force. Later in the day the wing flew with JG 27 and JG 3 against the Eighth Air Force. The German fighters shot down four B-17s, including that of Brigadier General Frederick Walker Castle. On Christmas Day, 1944, III/JG 6 and four other gruppen opposed the 9th Bombardment Division, which committed 629 medium bombers against roads and rail targets in Germany and Belgium including St. Vith. The P-51s of the 352nd Fighter Group protected the bombers. A total of 223 of the bombers were damaged, primarily by German anti-aircraft artillery. Later, III Gruppe took off from Oldenburg in a bid to stop the US Ninth Air Force; the Bf 109G-14s were intercepted by Allied fighters between Cologne and Düren. In combat with Hawker Typhoons from No. 93 Squadron RAF, the gruppe lost five. The RAF Squadron reported no loss.

=== Operation Bodenplatte and end of the war ===
The airfield operation, planned for the 16 December 1944, was revived and put into action on 1 January 1945. Operation Bodenplatte mustered the remaining German fighter force in the west, numbering approximately 800 fighters, into one final effort to achieve air superiority and revive the stalled offensive. JG 6 was ordered to attack Volkel Air Base. The Fw 190G-1s equipped the staffeln.

I and III./JG 6 were to attack while II./JG 6 was to provide cover against fighters. I./JG 6 got 29 of its 34 Fw 190s ready, while 25 of II./JG 6's fighters took part. Overall, most of the 99 Fw 190s were made available for the operation. III./JG 6 received orders to target petrol installations on the airfield only. 78 Fw 190s took off. JG 6 approached the airfield of Heesch and some of its pilots assumed it to be Volkel airfield. It is unlikely that the Heesch strip, built in October 1944, was known to the Luftwaffe. No. 126 Wing RCAF was based there and had dispatched its 411 and 442 Squadrons on recce missions early that morning so the majority of its units were airborne. Its 401 Squadron was readying for take-off when JG 6 appeared.

Most of the German pilots had failed to notice the airfield, concentrating on keeping formation at low altitude. 401 Squadron scrambled. Some of the German fighters were authorised to engage, while the main body continued to search for Volkel. Stab., and II./JG 6 stumbled on another strip at Helmond, which contained no aircraft. Several German pilots believed it to be Volkel and attacked, losing several of their number to ground fire. II./JG 6 suffered severely from Spitfire and Tempests based at Helmond. Very little damage was done at Heesch or Helmond. All four Gruppen failed to find Volkel and its Hawker Tempests remained untouched.

The only success JG 6 had was I./JG's erroneous attack on Eindhoven, which claimed 33 fighters and six medium bombers. Like Volkel, Helmond and Heesch had escaped damage. In the dogfights over Helmond, JG 6 claimed six victories. In fact, only two Spitfires were shot down and one badly damaged. Only one further fighter, a Hawker Typhoon, was shot down. Stab./JG 6 lost the Kommodore, Kogler, as a prisoner of war. Of I./JG's 29 Fw 190s, seven were lost and two damaged; of II./JG 6's 25 Fw 190s, eight were destroyed and two damaged; III./JG 6 lost 12 out 20 Bf 109s. In total, JG 6 lost 43% of its strength and suffered 16 pilots killed or missing and seven captured. As well as Kogler, one other commanding officer was lost—Gruppenkommandeure Helmut Kühle. Three Staffelkapitane were lost: Hauptmann Ewald Trost was captured, Hauptmann Norbert Katz was killed and Lothar Gerlach was posted missing, presumed killed.

== Commanding officers ==
Geschwaderkommodore

- Oberstleutnant Johann Kogler, July 1944 – 1 January 1945
- Major Gerhard Barkhorn, 16 January 1945 – 10 April 1945
- Major Gerhard Schöpfel, 10 April 1945 – 17 April 1945
- Major Richard Leppla, 17 April 1945 – 8 May 1945

Gruppenkommandeure;

I./JG 6

- Hauptmann Willi Elstermann 1 November 1944 – 2 February 1945
- Major Otto Bertram, February 1945 – May 1945

II./JG 6

- Hauptmann Willi Elstermann July 1944 – 31 August 1944
- Hauptmann Johannes Naumann 1 September 1944 – 30 March 1945
- Hauptmann Günther Weyl – May 1945

III./JG 6

- Hauptmann Theodor Weissenberger, 14 October 1944 – 24 November 1944
- Major Helmut Kühle, November 1944
- Hauptmann Kurt Müller, 21 January 1945 – 4 April 1945

== See also ==
- Organization of the Luftwaffe during World War II
