= Gerhard Michalski =

German World War II fighter pilot (1917–1946)

- Born: 25 June 1917; Augsdorf
- Died: 22 February 1946 (aged 28); Kaltenkirchen
- Military career
- Allegiance: Nazi Germany
- Branch: Luftwaffe
- Rank: Oberstleutnant (lieutenant colonel)
- Units: JG 53, JG z.b.V., JG 4, JG 11
- Commands: JG 4
- Conflicts: See battles World War II: Battle of France; Battle of Britain; Eastern Front; Battle of Malta; Defense of the Reich
- Awards: Knight's Cross of the Iron Cross with Oak Leaves

Gerhard Michalski (25 June 1917 – 22 February 1946) was a German Luftwaffe military aviator and wing commander during World War II. As a fighter ace, he is credited with 73 aerial victories in 652 missions, of which 59 victories were achieved over the Western Front including 13 four-engine bombers, and 14 over the Eastern Front. He was awarded the Knight's Cross of the Iron Cross with Oak Leaves, the highest award in the military and paramilitary forces of Nazi Germany during World War II.

== Early life and career ==
Michalski was born on 25 June 1917 in Augsdorf in the Province of Saxony of the German Empire. In 1936, he volunteered for military service in the Luftwaffe and was promoted to Leutnant in 1938. Michalski received the Iron Cross 2nd Class (Eisernes Kreuz 2. Klasse) on 28 September 1939.

== World War II ==
Michalski joined 6. Staffel (6th squadron) of Jagdgeschwader 53 (JG 53—53rd Fighter Wing) in 1940. He claimed his first victory on 31 March 1940 during the "Phoney War", when he downed a French Morane Saulnier MS 406 fighter over the French border near Püttlingen. Flying through the Battle of Britain, he claimed eight further aerial victories. In October 1940, Michalski was appointed Adjutant in II./JG 53.

JG 53 flew its last mission on the Channel Front on 4 June 1941. Four days later, II. Gruppe was ordered to Mannheim-Sandhofen Airfield.

=== Operation Barbarossa ===
In preparation of Operation Barbarossa, the German invasion of the Soviet Union, the aircraft were given a maintenance overhaul at Mannheim-Sandhofen Airfield. On 12 June, II. Gruppe relocated to Sobolewo. On 21 June, the commanding officers were ordered to Suwałki where they were briefed by Generalfeldmarschall Albert Kesselring.

With JG 53 participating in the invasion of Russia from June 1941 onward, Michalski claimed 13 further victories by the end of August 1941 for a total of 22.

On 5 October 1941, II. Gruppe of JG 53 was withdrawn from the Eastern Front and ordered to Insterburg, present-day Chernyakhovsk. The Gruppe was then sent to Leeuwarden Airfield in the Netherlands where they arrived on 12. October. Prior to the relocation, Michalski was appointed Staffelkapitän (squadron leader) of 4. Staffel of JG 53, replacing Oberleutnant Kurt Liedtke in this capacity.

=== Mediterranean theater ===
In November 1941, II. Gruppe of JG 53 was relocated to Sicily for operations against Malta. Michalski was to become the most successful German fighter pilot in the Siege of Malta, claiming 26 victories against the island's defenders. Michalski was appointed Gruppenkommandeur (group commander) of II. Gruppe of JG 53 in August 1942. He succeeded Hauptmann Walter Spies who was transferred. Command of 4. Staffel was then passed to Oberleutnant Wilhelm Hobirk for two months before it was assigned to Leutnant Fritz Dinger in October. He was awarded the Knight's Cross of the Iron Cross (Ritterkreuz des Eisernen Kreuzes) for 41 victories in September. On 1 October, Michalski was promoted to Hauptmann (captain).

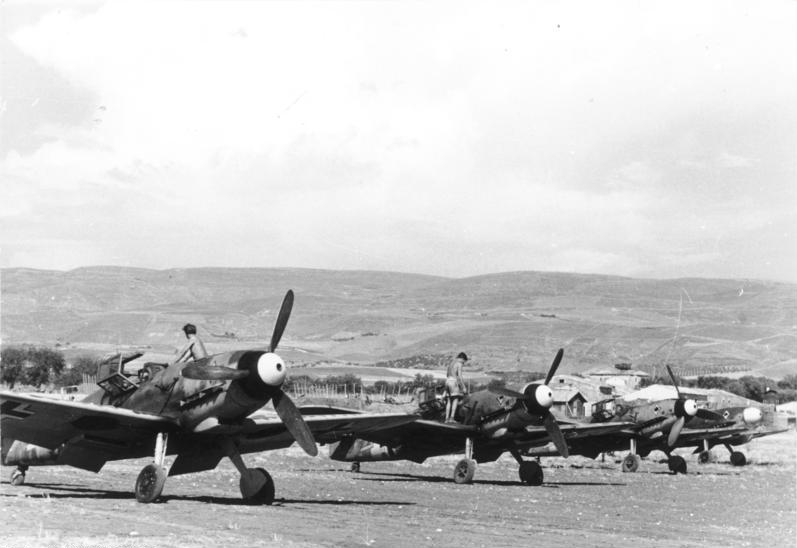
Bf 109s of JG 53 in southern Italy, similar to those flown by Michalski.

On 15 October, Michalski was shot down in his Bf 109 G-2 (Werknummer 10484—factory number). He bailed out over sea, climbed into his life raft before he was picked up by a Dornier Do 24 flying boat of Seenotstaffel 6, the 6th Squadron of the German air-sea rescue service. His victors were No. 126 Squadron Supermarine Spitfire fighters, flown by F/L. Jones and F/Sgt Varey, who shot him down off Marsaxlokk Bay.

In November 1942, II./JG 53 were sent to Tunisia. On 27 November, Michalski claimed a Spitfire fighter shot down 15 kilometers (9.3 miles) south of Majaz al Bab. That day, the RAF lost two Spitfires in aerial combat, one from No. 72 Squadron and another from No. 152 Squadron, plus another Spitfire damaged in combat. While Luftwaffe pilots claimed ten Spitfires shot down.

Following the fall of Tunisia, II./JG 53 relocated to bases in Sicily in May 1943. By June 1943, the Geschwaderkommodore (wing commander) of JG 53, Oberst Günther Freiherr von Maltzahn, had fallen ill and could no longer lead JG 53 during combat missions. In consequence, Michalski was tasked with leading the air elements of JG 53. On 13 June, Michalski claimed a Supermarine Spitfire fighter shot down near Syracuse. His opponent may have been Wing Commander John Ellis who bailed out and was taken prisoner of war.

On 18 June 1943, II. Gruppe engaged in combat with eight Spitfire fighters over southeast Sicily. In this encounter, Michalski was shot down in his Bf 109 G-6 (Werknummer 16362) near Donnafugata Castle. Forced to bail out, he was injured and taken to hospital in Ragusa. His victor was Flying Officer George Noel Keith Royal Canadian Air Force (RCAF), flying a Spitfire of No. 72 Squadron. He bailed out wounded in the leg and with a broken ankle, landing in the sea, from where he was rescued by the German air-sea rescue service. Hospitalised, he returned to JG 53 in August 1943.

On 1 October, Michalski was promoted to Major (major). In November 1943, II./JG 53 was relocated to airfields in Austria, operating on Reichsverteidigung (Defense of the Reich) duties. Michalski claimed his 60th victory on 2 November.

=== Wing commander ===
On 24 April 1944, Michalski was made Geschwaderkommodore of the newly formed Jagdgeschwader z.b.V. (JG z.b.V.—fighter wing for special deployment), a special purpose unit which was tasked with defending the southern German airspace under control of 7. Jagd-Division (7th Fighter Division). Initially, the unit was based at Kassel and equipped with the Bf 109 G-6. On 29 April, the United States Army Air Forces (USAAF) Eighth Air Force headed for Berlin. Michalski led the Stab and II. Gruppe of Jagdgeschwader 27 (JG 27—27th Fighter Wing) on the intercept mission. Near Schandelah, present-day part of Cremlingen, he shot down a Boeing B-17 Flying Fortress bomber. On 1 May, the Eighth Air Force attacked German railroad infrastructure in southern Germany. Defending against this attack, Michalski was shot down by USAAF escorting fighters in his Bf 109 G-6 (Werknummer 440232) near Saarbrücken. Due to his injuries, he was taken off duty. The position of Geschwaderkommodore was left vacant until on 21 May Major Walther Dahl was given command of JG z.b.V.

Following his recovery, Michalski was transferred to the Verbandsführerschule of the General der Jagdflieger on 20 May 1944. On 21 July, he joined the Stabsstaffel, I./Jagdgeschwader 11.

On 15 June, JG z.b.V. had been renamed and became Jagdgeschwader 4 (JG 4—4th Fighter Wing) and Dahl was replaced by Major Gerhard Schöpfel as commander of JG 4. When on 6 August Schöpfel was wounded in combat, Michalski was transferred and became Geschwaderkommodore of JG 4. Following the Allied aerial landings in Operation Market Garden on 17 September, Michalski was instructed to immediately transfer the Geschwaderstab to Dortmund Airfield. Here, he came under control of 3. Jagd-Division (3rd Fighter Division). Michalski was then tasked with the formation of a Gefechtsverband, a detachment consisting of I. Gruppe of Jagdgeschwader 3, III. Gruppe of JG 4, III. Gruppe of JG 53, II. Gruppe of Jagdgeschwader 77 and III. Gruppe of Jagdgeschwader 300. From 18 to 25 September, Michalski led this detachment also dubbed Gefechtsverband Michalski. Michalski was awarded the Knight's Cross of the Iron Cross with Oak Leaves (Ritterkreuz des Eisernen Kreuzes mit Eichenlaub) on 25 November for 72 victories. On 1 January 1945, Michalski was promoted to Oberstleutnant (lieutenant colonel).

As Geschwaderkommodore, Michalski was ordered to Berlin on 22 January 1945 and attended the meeting with Reichsmarschall Hermann Göring which was later dubbed the Fighter Pilots' Mutiny. This was an attempt to reinstate Generalleutnant Adolf Galland as General der Jagdflieger who had been dismissed for outspokenness regarding the Oberkommando der Luftwaffe (Luftwaffe high command), and had been replaced by Oberst Gordon Gollob. The meeting was held at the Haus der Flieger in Berlin and was attended by a number of high-ranking fighter pilot leaders which included Michalski, Günther Lützow, Hannes Trautloft, Hermann Graf, Erich Leie, Helmut Bennemann, Kurt Bühligen and Herbert Ihlefeld, and their antagonist Göring supported by his staff Bernd von Brauchitsch and Karl Koller. The fighter pilots, with Lützow taking the lead as spokesman, criticized Göring and made him personally responsible for the decisions taken which effectively had led to the lost air war over Europe.

== Later life ==
Michalski was involved in a motor vehicle accident on 22 February 1946 and died in a hospital at the age of 28 in Kaltenkirchen. His brother Werner was killed in action as a Leutnant on 10 April 1942 serving with Jagdgeschwader 26 "Schlageter".

== Summary of career ==
=== Aerial victory claims ===
According to US historian David T. Zabecki, Michalski was credited with 73 aerial victories. Spick also lists him with 73 aerial victories in 652 missions, of which 59 victories were achieved over the Western Front including 13 four-engine bombers and 29 Spitfire fighters. Mathews and Foreman, authors of Luftwaffe Aces — Biographies and Victory Claims, researched the German Federal Archives and found records for 68 aerial victory claims, plus three further unconfirmed claims. This number includes 14 on the Eastern Front and 54 on the Western Front, including 11 four-engined bombers.

Victory claims were logged to a map-reference (PQ = Planquadrat), for example "PQ 03 Ost 9848". The Luftwaffe grid map (Jägermeldenetz) covered all of Europe, western Russia and North Africa and was composed of rectangles measuring 15 minutes of latitude by 30 minutes of longitude, an area of about 360 square miles (930 km^{2}). These sectors were then subdivided into 36 smaller units to give a location area 3 km × 4 km (1.9 mi × 2.5 mi) in size.

Chronicle of aerial victories
This and the – (dash) indicates unconfirmed aerial victory claims for which Michalski did not receive credit. This along with the * (asterisk) indicates an Herausschuss (separation shot)—a severely damaged heavy bomber forced to separate from his combat box which was counted as an aerial victory. This and the ! (exclamation mark) indicates those aerial victories listed by Prien, Stemmer, Rodeike and Bock. This and the # (hash mark) indicates those aerial victories listed by Mathews and Foreman. This and the ? (question mark) indicates information discrepancies listed by Prien, Stemmer, Rodeike, Bock, Mathews and Foreman.
Claim!	Claim#	Date	Time	Type	Location	Claim!	Claim#	Date	Time	Type	Location
– Stab II. Gruppe of Jagdgeschwader 53 – "Phoney War" — 1 September 1939 – 9 May 1940
1		31 March 1940	16:00	M.S.406	southwest of Sarreguemines						
– 6. Staffel of Jagdgeschwader 53 – At the Channel and over England — 26 June – August 1940
2	1	15 August 1940	18:50	Hurricane	southwest of Portland						
– Stab II. Gruppe of Jagdgeschwader 53 – At the Channel and over England — August 1940 – 8 June 1941
3	2	10 October 1940	11:40? (Note: According to Mathews and Foreman claimed at 11:45.)	Spitfire	Folkestone; Thames Estuary	7		24 November 1940	16:50	Hurricane	Gravesend
4	3	11 October 1940	08:55	Spitfire		8	6	30 November 1940	15:26	Hurricane	Ashford
5	4	28 October 1940	17:28	Hurricane	20 km (12 mi) south of London	9	7	25 April 1941	15:47	Spitfire	
6	5	1 November 1940	15:40	Spitfire							
– Stab II. Gruppe of Jagdgeschwader 53 – Operation Barbarossa — 22 June – 8 October 1941
10	8	1 July 1941	13:52	I-153		17	15	29 August 1941	15:57	I-16? (Note: According to Mathews and Foreman claimed as a Mikoyan-Gurevich MiG-1.)	
11	9	4 July 1941	16:45	SB-2		18	16	11 September 1941	09:02	I-18 (MiG-1)	
12	10	4 July 1941	16:49	SB-3		19	17	21 September 1941	16:05	I-18 (MiG-1)	
13	11	5 July 1941	09:26	SB-3	southeast of Smitten	20	18	23 September 1941	17:05	I-18 (MiG-1)	
14	12	14 July 1941	19:24	DB-3		21	19	28 September 1941	08:03	I-18 (MiG-1)	
15	13	19 July 1941	17:25	R-5		22	20	4 October 1941	09:43? (Note: According to Mathews and Foreman claimed at 09:45.)	I-18 (MiG-1)	
16	14	27 August 1941	17:10	R-5							
– 4. Staffel of Jagdgeschwader 53 – Mediterranean Theater — 15 December 1941 – August 1942
23? (Note: This claim is not listed by Prien, Stemmer, Rodeike and Bock.)	21	20 December 1941	16:40	Hurricane		35	30	29 June 1942	08:45	Spitfire	
24		29 December 1941	10:40	Hurricane		36	31	2 July 1942	08:07	Spitfire	10 km (6.2 mi) northeast of Malta; 5–8 km (3.1–5.0 mi) north of Ta' Vnezja
25	22	3 January 1942	09:18? (Note: According to Mathews and Foreman claimed at 14:18.)	Hurricane		37	32	2 July 1942	13:30	Spitfire	7–8 km (4.3–5.0 mi) east of La Valletta
26	23	20 January 1942	14:18	Hurricane		38	33	8 July 1942	06:48	Spitfire	
27	—	24 January 1942	14:25	Hurricane		39	34	8 July 1942	11:35	Spitfire	
28	24	17 March 1942	08:08	Spitfire	Malta	40	35	30 July 1942	08:25	Spitfire	
29	—	2 April 1942	10:42	Spitfire		41	36	31 July 1942	14:58	Spitfire	
30	25	8 May 1942	09:40	P-40	Ta' Vnezja	42	37	31 July 1942	15:00	Spitfire	
	26	14 May 1942	11:43	Spitfire			38	2 August 1942	14:30	Spitfire	5 km (3.1 mi) west of Venezia
31		15 May 1942	11:31	Spitfire		43	39	2 August 1942	16:23	Spitfire	
32	27	3 June 1942	11:13	Spitfire	60 km (37 mi) southeast of Pantelleria	44	40	10 August 1942	12:21	Spitfire	
33	28	8 June 1942	11:25	Spitfire		45?		12 August 1942	—	Spitfire	
34	29	15 June 1942	10:40	Beaufighter	70 km (43 mi) southeast of Pantelleria	46	41	14 August 1942	18:48	Spitfire	
– Stab II. Gruppe of Jagdgeschwader 53 – Mediterranean Theater — August – 31 December 1942
47	42	13 October 1942? (Note: According to Prien, this claim was dated 12 October 1942.)	14:10? (Note: According to Mathews and Foreman claimed at 14:16.)	Spitfire	20 km (12 mi) north of La Valletta	49	44	27 November 1942	14:56	Spitfire	15 km (9.3 mi) south of Majaz al Bab
48	43	14 October 1942	08:20	Spitfire	vicinity of Malta						
– Stab II. Gruppe of Jagdgeschwader 53 – Mediterranean Theater — 1 January – 15 October 1943
50?	—	1 January 1943	11:56	Spitfire		56	50	19 April 1943	16:08	Spitfire	3 km (1.9 mi) southeast of Menzel Temime; 15 km (9.3 mi) southwest of Zembra
51	45	25 February 1943	12:16	P-38	15 km (9.3 mi) west of Tebourba	57	51	2 May 1943	14:54	P-40	southwest of Béja
52? (Note: This claim is not listed by Prien.)		2 March 1943	11:50	Spitfire	5 km (3.1 mi) southeast of Sfax	58	52	8 June 1943	08:52	Spitfire	40 km (25 mi) south-southwest of Pozzallo
	46	2 March 1943	11:50	B-17*	5 km (3.1 mi) southeast of Béja	59	53	9 June 1943	14:00	P-38	15 km (9.3 mi) south of Pantelleria
53?	47	22 March 1943	14:10	P-38	PQ 03 Ost 9848	60	54	13 June 1943	12:12	Spitfire	Syracuse
54	48	18 April 1943	19:05	P-40	4 km (2.5 mi) southeast of the Gulf of Tunis	61?	55	8 September 1943	17:00	P-38	50 km (31 mi) southwest of Capri
55	49	19 April 1943	15:56	Spitfire	15 km (9.3 mi) southwest of Zembra						
– Stab II. Gruppe of Jagdgeschwader 53 – Defense of the Reich — 16 October – 31 December 1943
62	56	2 November 1943	12:40? (Note: According to Mathews and Foreman claimed at 12:48.)	B-24*	Kaindorf						
– Stab II. Gruppe of Jagdgeschwader 53 – Defense of the Reich — 1 January – April 1944
63	57	7 January 1944	11:28	P-38	15 km (9.3 mi) south of Kalsdorf	67		8 April 1944	—	B-24	
64	58	24 February 1944	12:56	B-17	vicinity of Friedburg	68		11 April 1944	—	B-24	
65	59	25 February 1944	11:56	B-24	Radlersberg-Fridau	69	61	13 April 1944	15:54	B-17	Königsdorf
66	60	23 March 1944	10:28	B-17	southwest of Braundes	70	62	19 April 1944	10:35	B-17	south of Hann. Münden, east of Kassel
– Stab of Jagdgruppe z.b.V. – Defense of the Reich — April 1944
71	63	29 April 1944	11:03	B-17	Schandelah, east of Braunschweig						
– Stab of Jagdgeschwader 4 – Defense of the Reich — September 1944 – 8 May 1945
72	64	21 September 1944	15:25	Lancaster	northwest of Nijmegen	75	67	2 November 1944	12:56? (Note: According to Mathews and Foreman claimed at 11:56.)	B-17	PQ 15 Ost JD-JE
73	65	27 September 1944	18:15	Typhoon	southwest of Goch	76	68	8 March 1945	10:27	Yak-9	Eastern Front
74	66	2 November 1944	12:55	B-17	PQ 15 Ost JE-JD						

=== Awards ===
- Iron Cross (1939)
  - 2nd Class (28 September 1939)
  - 1st Class (3 September 1940)
- Knight's Cross of the Iron Cross with Oak Leaves
  - Knight's Cross on 4 September 1942 as Oberleutnant and Staffelkapitän of the 4./Jagdgeschwader 53
  - 667th Oak Leaves on 25 November 1944 as Major and Geschwaderkommodore of Jagdgeschwader 4

== Notes ==
Military offices
Preceded by none	Commander of Jagdgeschwader z.b.V. 20 April 1944 – 20 May 1944	Succeeded by Hauptmann Walther Dahl
Preceded by Major Gerhard Schöpfel	Commander of Jagdgeschwader 4; 7 August 1944 – 8 May 1945	Succeeded by none
