= Hans Ehlers =

German fighter pilot during World War II (1914–1944)

- Born: 15 July 1914; Hennstedt, Germany
- Died: 27 December 1944 (aged 30); Bereborn, Germany
- Cause of death: Killed in action
- Military career
- Allegiance: Nazi Germany
- Branch: Luftwaffe
- Rank: Hauptmann (captain)
- Units: Condor Legion, JG 3, JG 1
- Commands: 2./JG 1, 3./JG 1, I./JG 1
- Conflicts: See battles Spanish Civil War World War II: Battle of France; Battle of Britain; Operation Barbarossa; Defense of the Reich; Schweinfurt–Regensburg mission; Battle of the Bulge †
- Awards: Spanish Cross in Silver with Swords; Knight's Cross of the Iron Cross

Hans Ehlers (Note: According to Scherzer his first name is Johann.) (15 July 1914 – 27 December 1944) was a German military aviator who served in the Luftwaffe during World War II. As a fighter ace, he was credited with 55—that is, 55 aerial combat encounters resulting in the destruction of the enemy aircraft—claimed in an unknown number of combat missions. He claimed eleven victories on the Eastern Front and 44 over the Western Allies, including 23 four-engine bombers.

Born in Hennstedt, Ehlers volunteered for service with the Condor Legion during the Spanish Civil War where he was assigned to the ground crew of Jagdgruppe 88 (J/88—88th Fighter Group). Following service in Spain, Ehlers was trained as a fighter pilot and posted to Jagdgeschwader 3 (JG 3—3rd Fighter Wing) He claimed his first aerial victory on 18 May 1940 during the Battle of France. He then fought in Battle of Britain and Operation Barbarossa, the invasion of the Soviet Union. Due to an organizational change, his unit became part of Jagdgeschwader 1 (JG 1—1st Fighter Wing) in early 1942 and was stationed on the Western Front and fighting in Defense of the Reich.

Ehlers was appointed Gruppenkommandeur (group commander) of I. Gruppe (1st group) of JG 1. On 9 June 1944, Ehlers was awarded the Knight's Cross of the Iron Cross and was killed in action on 27 December 1944, when he was shot down near Bereborn during the Battle of the Bulge.

== Early life and career ==
Ehlers was born on 15 July 1914 in a Hennstedt, at the time in the Province of Schleswig-Holstein of the German Empire. He volunteered for service with the Condor Legion during the Spanish Civil War. There, Ehlers was a member of the groundstaff of 3. Staffel (3rd squadron) of Jagdgruppe 88 (J/88–88th Fighter Group), at the time under the command of Adolf Galland. For his service in Spain, he was awarded the Spanish Cross in Silver with Swords (Spanienkreuz in Silver mit Schwertern) on 14 April 1939. Following his return from Spain, Ehlers received flight training at the pilot school in Salzwedel starting on 1 August. (Note: Flight training in the Luftwaffe progressed through the levels A1, A2 and B1, B2, referred to as A/B flight training. A training included theoretical and practical training in aerobatics, navigation, long-distance flights and dead-stick landings. The B courses included high-altitude flights, instrument flights, night landings and training to handle the aircraft in difficult situations.) On 18 September, he transferred to the Jagdfliegerschule 1, the fighter pilot school at Werneuchen before he was posted to the Ergänzungs-Jagdgruppe Merseburg, a supplementary training unit based at Merseburg, on 16 November.

== World War II ==
World War II in Europe began on Friday 1 September 1939 when German forces invaded Poland. On 7 December 1939, Ehlers was posted to the 2. Staffel of Jagdgeschwader 3 (JG 3—3rd Fighter Wing). At the time, the Staffel was based at Zerbst and commanded by Hauptmann Heinz Gärtner which was subordinated to I. Gruppe (1st group) headed by Hauptmann Günther Lützow. On 18 May 1940, during the Battle of France, Ehlers claimed his first aerial victories when he shot down a Royal Air Force (RAF) Supermarine Spitfire fighter and Hawker Hurricane fighter near Valenciennes. He in turn, was then shot down by RAF fighters on the same day and crash-landed his Messerschmitt Bf 109 E-1 south of Valenciennes and was initially listed as missing in action, rejoining his unit shortly later.

During the Battle of Britain, Ehlers was almost shot down in aerial combat with the RAF. His Bf 109 E-4 was damaged, resulting in a forced landing near Colembert. He claimed his first aerial victory of this battle on 26 August when he shot down a Spitfire west of Calais. On 5 September, I. Gruppe escorted 22 Dornier Do 17 light bombers to London where Ehlers claimed another Spitfire shot down. On 5 February 1941, the RAF flew "Circus" No. 3 targeting the airfield at Saint-Omer. That day, Ehlers claimed his fifth aerial victory over a Spitfire fighter shot down northwest of Saint-Omer.

=== War against the Soviet Union ===
In preparation for Operation Barbarossa, the German invasion of the Soviet Union, the I. Gruppe moved to an airfield at Dub on 18 June 1941. At the start of the campaign, JG 3 was subordinated to the V. Fliegerkorps (5th Air Corps), under command of General der Flieger Robert Ritter von Greim, which was part of Luftflotte 4 (4th Air Fleet), under command of Generaloberst Alexander Löhr. These air elements supported Generalfeldmarschall Gerd von Rundstedt's Heeresgruppe Süd (Army Group South), with the objective of capturing Ukraine and its capital Kiev.

On 22 June, German forces invaded the Soviet Union. The Gruppe was tasked with suppressing aerial opposition the area of Lviv by attacking the Soviet airfields in that area. In total, I. Gruppe claimed 36 aircraft destroyed on the ground plus further 8 aerial victories on the first day, including a Polikarpov I-16 fighter by Ehlers. On 30 June, I. Gruppe moved to an airfield at Lutsk in northwestern Ukraine. That day, Ehlers was wounded in a takeoff accident at Lutsk which destroyed his Bf 109 F-2 (Werknummer 5708—factory number). The cause of the accident was a ground collision with a Henschel Hs 126 air reconnaissance aircraft from 4. Staffel (Heer) of Aufklärungsgruppe 22 (22nd Reconnaissance Group). Following his convalescence, Ehlers claimed his next aerial victories during combat leading up to the Battle of Kiev. Fighting over the battle zones over Kiev and Kaniv on 15 August, he claimed an I-17 fighter and a V-11 ground attack aircraft shot down. The I-17 was an early German wartime designation for the Mikoyan-Gurevich MiG-1 fighter, while the V-11 designator referred to the Ilyushin Il-2 ground attack aircraft.

On 26 August, I. Gruppe was moved to a forward airfield named Gubin located near the front at Hornostaipil. That day, Ehlers claimed an I-16 fighter, one of three aerial victories claimed by the Gruppe that day. Four days later, the Gruppe flew ten combat missions, two in support of Junkers Ju 87 dive-bombers and eight to protect the bridges crossing the Dnieper near Hornostaipil. Ehlers claimed an R-10 aircraft, referring to either a light bomber, biplane or a Seversky aircraft, and an I-17 fighter. On 16 September, the bulk of I. Gruppe was ordered back to Germany while 12 pilots and 40 men from the ground staff remained on the Eastern Front and were sent to either II. or III. Gruppe of JG 3. Ehlers was assigned to III. Gruppe and claimed an Il-2 ground attack aircraft on 11 October before returning to I. Gruppe.

=== Western Front ===
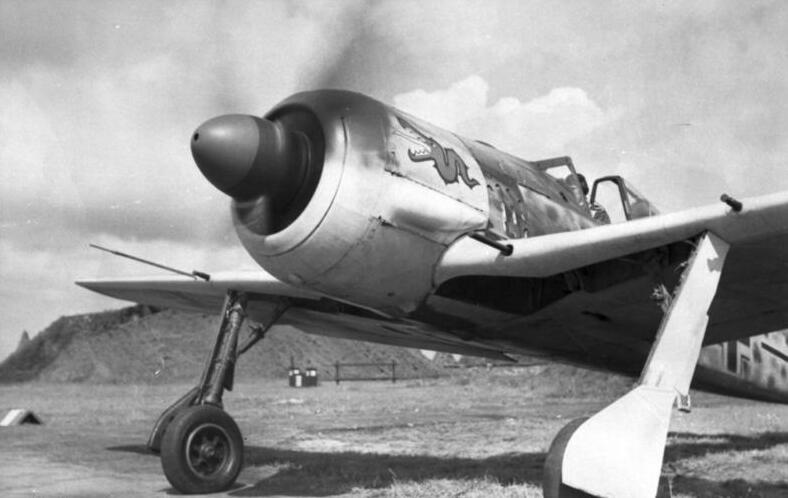
A Fw 190 A of II./JG 1, similar to those flown by Ehlers.

In September 1941, with the exception of 3. Staffel which followed in November, I. Gruppe of JG 3 was transferred from the Eastern Front to Germany for rest and re-supply. In November 1941, it was transferred to the northern Netherlands and on 15 January 1942 re-designated II. Gruppe of Jagdgeschwader 1 (JG 1—1st Fighter Wing) in Katwijk. In consequence, 1. Staffel of JG 3 became the 4. Staffel of JG 1, 2. Staffel of JG 3 became the 5. Staffel of JG 1, and 3. Staffel of JG 3 became the 6. Staffel of JG 1.

In May 1942, II. Gruppe was reequipped with the Focke-Wulf Fw 190 A series, a radial engine powered fighter aircraft, at Woensdrecht Air Field. Ehlers claimed his first aerial victory flying the Fw 190 on 19 June. That day, 17 Fw 190s from 4. and 6. Staffel intercepted a flight of 24 Spitfire fighters in the area Zeebrugge. In this encounter, Ehlers claimed two Spitfires shot down. On 6 December, Ehlers claimed his first United States Army Air Forces (USAAF) heavy bomber shot down, his 17th aerial victory in total. That day, 66 Boeing B-17 Flying Fortress bombers headed for the industrials areas of Lille of which 37 bombed the target area.

On 22 January 1943, 15 to 20 North American B-25 Mitchell bombers escorted by Spitfire and North American P-51 Mustang fighters were intercepted by 10 Fw 190 from II. Gruppe over sea northwest of Blankenberge. In this encounter, Ehrler shot down a Spitfire fighter 60 kilometers (37 miles) north of Walcheren. On 11 March, Ehrler may have shot down a Spitfire fighter on an aerial reconnaissance mission. On 3 May, 16 Douglas A-20 Havoc bombers and 16 Lockheed Ventura bombers, escorted by 60 Spitfires and 40 Republic P-47 Thunderbolt fighters crossed the coast of Netherlands between 17:45 and 18:00. The Luftwaffe scrambled 24 Fw 190s from II. Gruppe of JG 1 and eight Bf 109s from 2. Staffel of Jagdgeschwader 27 (JG 27—27th Fighter Wing). Defending against this attack, Ehlers was credited with a Spitfire fighter and a Ventura bomber shot down. The Spitfire was piloted by Wing Commander Howard Blatchford who was killed in action.

=== Defense of the Reich ===
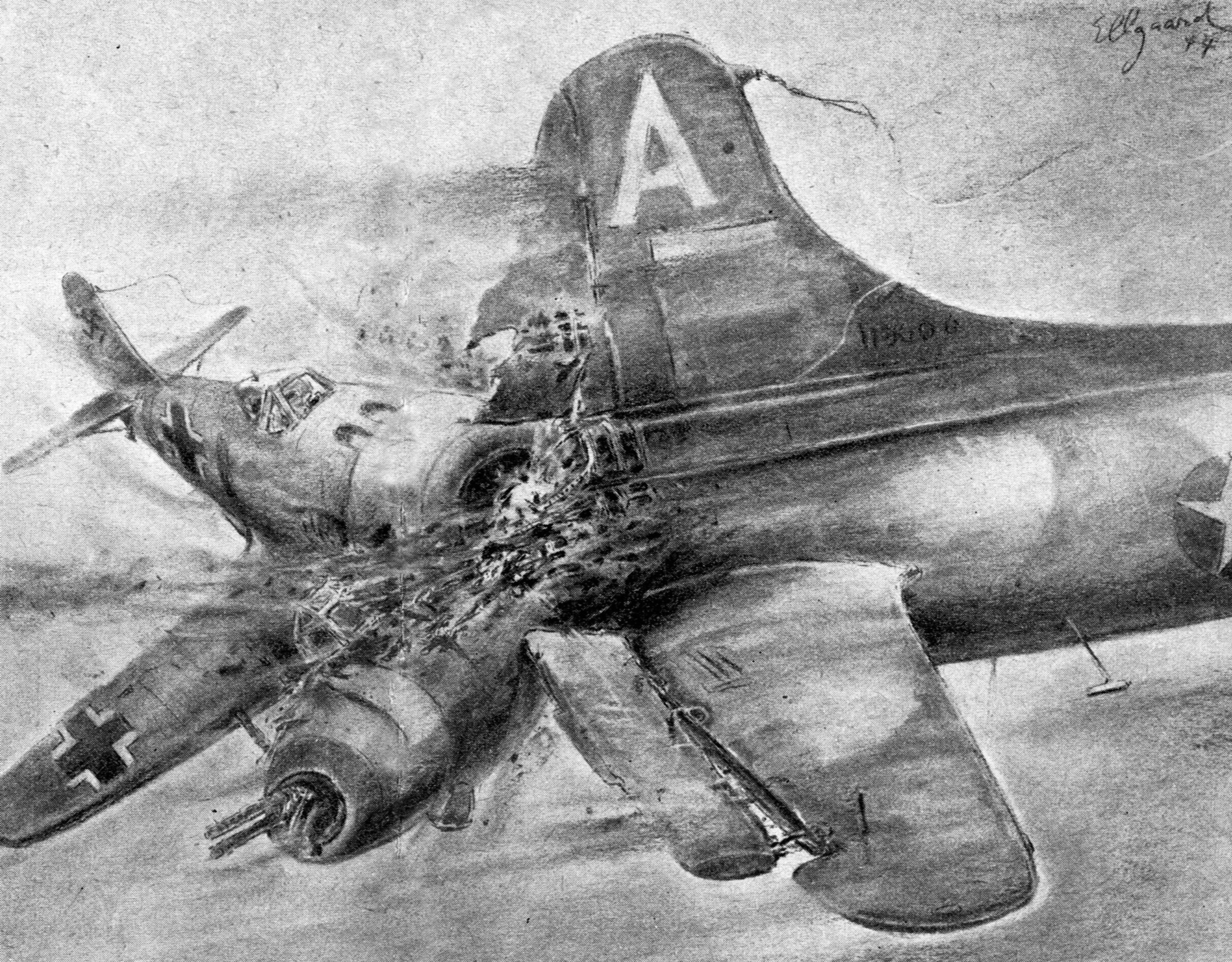
A 1944 drawing by Helmuth Ellgaard illustrating "ramming"

Ehlers was promoted to Leutnant (second lieutenant) on 1 July 1943. On 7 July, I. Gruppe of JG 1 moved to Deelen Air Field. The USAAF targeted the German aircraft industry on 17 August in the Schweinfurt–Regensburg mission. The bombers of the 1st Bombardment Wing headed for the ball bearing factories at Schweinfurt. At 11:50, the Luftwaffe fighters of I. Gruppe of JG 1 intercepted a large formation of B-17 bombers in the area of Aschaffenburg. Following the bombers on their southern heading, Ehlers shot down two B-17 bombers. That day, the commander of 2. Staffel of JG 1, Leutnant Hans Feustel, was wounded in combat. In consequence, Ehlers was appointed Staffelkapitän (squadron leader) of 2. Staffel the following day.

On 8 October, fying Fw 190 A-6 (Werknummer 530715), Ehlers rammed a B-17 bomber near Neuenhaus and Bentheim. That day, VIII Bomber Command had targeted Bremen and German ship building at Bremen-Vegesack. The aircraft rammed was the B-17 "Marie Helena" from the 351st Bombardment Squadron whose entire crew was killed in the collision. That day, JG 1 lost its commanding officer, Oberstleutnant Hans Philipp, who was killed in action. Two other pilots of 2. Staffel also spontaneously executed an unprecedented maneuver by ramming B-17 bombers that were returning westward from a raid against shipyards and factories in Bremen and Vegesack. All three Luftwaffe pilots survived, while all three of their targets were destroyed. This was the only significant ramming attack by Luftwaffe pilots until nearly the end of the war in 1945.

On 23 October 1943, Reichsmarschall Hermann Göring, the Commander-in-Chief of the Luftwaffe, visited JG 1 at Deelen Air Field. During this visit, Ehlers was presented the German Cross in Gold (Deutsches Kreuz in Gold) by Göring. On 11 December, Ehlers succeeded Oberleutnant Rolf Strohal as Staffelkapitän of 3. Staffel of JG 1. Combat damaged sustained on 13 April 1944 resulted in a forced landing at Gutersdorf near Landshut. His Fw 190 A-8 (Werknummer 170046) was a total loss.

=== Group commander and death ===
I./JG 1 insignia

On 17 April 1944, Ehlers was appointed Gruppenkommandeur (group commander) of I. Gruppe of JG 1, succeeding Major Rudolf-Emil Schnoor. Ehlers claimed his first aerial victory as Gruppenkommandeur on 13 May. That day 289 B-17 bombers from the 1st Bomb Division headed for oil targets in western Poland while 261 Consolidated B-24 Liberator bombers from the 2nd Bomb Division attacked the Focke-Wulf factories at Tutow. Further 199 B-17 bombers of the 3rd Bomb Division attacked railroad targets near Osnabrück. This attack force was escorted by 1,107 fighter aircraft. JG 1 was sent to intercept the bombers of the 1st Bomb Division but were engaged by the escorting fighters over the Bay of Lübeck. During this aerial battle, Ehlers claimed a P-47 fighter shot down.

Two days later, VIII Bomber Command sent almost 900 bombers to Berlin and Braunschweig. JG 1 intercepted the bombers near Rheine/Osnabrück. On this mission, Ehlers claimed a B-24 bomber destroyed. On 6 June, Allied forced launched the Normandy landings. At 05:00, Ehlers received the order to relocate to France. That day, I. Gruppe left the airfield at Bad Lippspringe and relocated to Le Mans Airfield. Ehlers was awarded the Knight's Cross of the Iron Cross (Ritterkreuz des Eisernen Kreuzes) on 9 June 1944. In September, I. Gruppe relocated back to Germany. During the period associated with Operation Overlord (6 June – 30 August 1944), the Gruppe claimed 50 aerial victories for the loss of 34 pilots killed, 3 taken prisoner of war, and further 13 wounded.

On 21 November, 421 B-17 bombers of the 1st Bomb Division attacked the Leuna works. According to Mathews and Foreman, Ehlers shot down a B-17 bomber that day. This claim is not listed by Prien and Rodeike. Ehlers claimed his last aerial victory on 25 December when approximately 400 B-17 and B-24 bombers attacked German communication and transportation centers in western Germany. I. Gruppe intercepted the bombers from the 2nd Bomb Division around St. Vith/Bastogne where for the loss of one of their own seven B-24 bombers were claimed, including one by Ehlers. On 27 December 1944, Ehlers led a flight of 18 Fw 190s on a mission to cover ground troops in the Dinant-Rochefort area during the Battle of the Bulge. On the approach to the target, they were intercepted by P-51 fighters of the USAAF 364th Fighter Group west of Mayen. Ehlers was shot down and killed in action in his Fw 190 A-8 (Werknummer 739363) near Bereborn. Ehlers had ignored the warnings of his fellow pilots and only three pilots returned from this mission. He was succeeded by Hauptmann Georg Hackbarth as commander of I. Gruppe. He had been nominated for the Knight's Cross of the Iron Cross with Oak Leaves (Ritterkreuz des Eisernen Kreuzes mit Eichenlaub) which was not approved before the war ended.

== Summary of career ==
=== Aerial victory claims ===
According to US historian David T. Zabecki, Ehlers was credited with 54 aerial victories. Obermaier however lists him with 55 aerial victories claimed in an unknown number of combat missions. This figure includes eleven claims on the Eastern Front and 44 over the Western Allies, including 23 four-engine bombers. Mathews and Foreman, authors of Luftwaffe Aces — Biographies and Victory Claims, researched the German Federal Archives and found records for 48 aerial victory claims, plus two further unconfirmed claims. This figure of confirmed claims includes nine aerial victories on the Eastern Front and 39 on the Western Front, including 22 four-engine bombers.

Victory claims were logged to a map-reference (PQ = Planquadrat), for example "PQ 05 Ost S/RT-8". The Luftwaffe grid map (Jägermeldenetz) covered all of Europe, western Russia and North Africa and was composed of rectangles measuring 15 minutes of latitude by 30 minutes of longitude, an area of about 360 square miles (930 km^{2}). These sectors were then subdivided into 36 smaller units to give a location area 3 km × 4 km (1.9 mi × 2.5 mi) in size.

Chronicle of aerial victories
This and the – (dash) indicates unconfirmed aerial victory claims for which Ehlers did not receive credit. This along with the * (asterisk) indicates an Herausschuss (separation shot)—a severely damaged heavy bomber forced to separate from his combat box which was counted as an aerial victory. This and the ? (question mark) indicates information discrepancies listed by Prien, Stemmer, Rodeike, Bock, Mathews and Foreman.
Claim	Date	Time	Type	Location	Claim	Date	Time	Type	Location
– 2. Staffel of Jagdgeschwader 3 – Battle of France — 10 May – 25 June 1940
1	18 May 1940	20:30~	Spitfire	southeast of Valenciennes	2	18 May 1940	20:30~? (Note: According to Mathews and Foreman claimed at 19:30 over a Hawker Hurricane.)	Spitfire?	southeast of Valenciennes
– 2. Staffel of Jagdgeschwader 3 – Battle of Britain and on the English Channel — 26 June 1940 – 9 June 1941
3	26 August 1940	—	Spitfire	west of Calais	5	5 February 1941	—	Spitfire	northwest of Saint-Omer
4	5 September 1940	—	Spitfire	vicinity of London					
– 3. Staffel of Jagdgeschwader 3 – Operation Barbarossa — 22 June – 6 November 1941
6	22 June 1941	—	I-16		— ? (Note: This unconfirmed claim is not listed by Mathews and Foreman.)	15 August 1941	—	V-11	
7	25 June 1941	15:06	I-153	20 km (12 mi) northeast of Dubno	11	26 August 1941	16:45	I-16	southeast of Oschilkij
8	26 June 1941	05:07	SB-2	15 km (9.3 mi) east of Dubno	12	30 August 1941	10:20	R-10 (Seversky)	northwest of Ostijew
9	26 June 1941	—	DI-6		13	30 August 1941	15:10	I-17 (MiG-1)	west of Ostijew
10	15 August 1941	06:08	I-17 (MiG-1)	15 km (9.3 mi) west of Gorodishche	14	11 October 1941	—	Il-2	
– 6. Staffel of Jagdgeschwader 1 – On the Western Front — 1 January – 31 October 1942
15	19 June 1942	11:24	Spitfire	20 km (12 mi) northeast of Zeebrugge	17	6 December 1942	12:45~	B-17	Lille-Ostend
16	19 June 1942	11:35	Spitfire	southwestern coast of Walcheren					
– 6. Staffel of Jagdgeschwader 1 – Defense of the Reich — 1 January – June 1943
18	22 January 1943	15:13	Spitfire	60 km (37 mi) north of Walcheren	21	4 May 1943	19:18	Spitfire	southeast of Lamswaarde
— ? (Note: Mathews and Foreman list this claim as his 19th confirmed aerial victory.)	11 March 1943	17:53	Spitfire	40 km (25 mi) west of IJmuiden	22	14 May 1943	—	P-47	40 km (25 mi) west of Vlissingen
19	3 May 1943	17:52	Spitfire	15 km (9.3 mi) northwest of Haarlem	23	10 June 1943	—	Spitfire	
20	3 May 1943	17:58	Ventura	25 km (16 mi) west of Haarlem	—	22 June 1943	08:30~	Spitfire	southwest of Rotterdam
– 2. Staffel of Jagdgeschwader 1 – Defense of the Reich — 17 August – 8 October 1943
24	17 August 1943	11:58	B-17	PQ 05 Ost S/RT-8 west of Wertheim	26	4 October 1943	11:50	B-17	PQ 05 Ost S/TN-6 west of Frankfurt
25	17 August 1943	12:15	B-17	PQ 05 Ost S/SR-5; Worms	27	8 October 1943	15:45	B-17*	PQ 05 Ost S/ES-9; 20 km (12 mi) northwest of Nienburg
– 3. Staffel of Jagdgeschwader 1 – Defense of the Reich — November – 31 December 1943
28? (Note: This claim is not listed by Mathews and Foreman.)	29 November 1943	—	B-17		32	16 December 1943	14:15	B-17	PQ 05 Ost S/DL/EL; Wadden Sea-IJsselmeer
29	1 December 1943	12:22	B-17	Düsseldorf	33	20 December 1943	12:00? (Note: According to Mathews and Foreman claimed at 12:05.)	B-17	PQ 05 Ost S/UP vicinity of Bremen
30	11 December 1943	12:25	B-17	PQ 05 Ost S/BO-4/5; Borger, southeast of Assen	? (Note: This claim is not listes by Prien, Stemmer, Rodeike and Bock.)	20 December 1943	12:30	B-17	North Sea, off the Frisian Islands
31	16 December 1943	14:05	B-17	PQ 05 Ost S/EL; IJsselmeer					
– 3. Staffel of Jagdgeschwader 1 – Defense of the Reich — 1 January – 16 April 1944
34	5 January 1944	12:45	B-17	Prüm-Saarbrücken	42? (Note: This claim is not listed by Mathews and Foreman.)	29 March 1944	—	P-38	
35	30 January 1944	12:03	B-17	PQ 15 Ost S/GB-HB	43	8 April 1944	13:55	B-24	PQ 15 Ost S/EB, vicinity of Salzwedel
36? (Note: According to Mathews and Foreman this claim is unconfirmed.)	30 January 1944	12:16~	B-17		44?	9 April 1944	—	B-17	
37?	20 February 1944	—	P-51		45?	9 April 1944	—	P-51	
38	22 February 1944	12:50	B-17	PQ 05 Ost S/JP, vicinity of Gelsenkirchen	46	11 April 1944	11:02	B-17	PQ 15 Ost S/GA, vicinity of Braunschweig
39	6 March 1944	12:35	B-17	PQ 05 Ost S/FR-2, north of Osnabrück	47?	11 April 1944	—	P-51	
40	8 March 1944	13:30	P-47	PQ 05 Ost S/FU, northwest of Hannover	48?	11 April 1944	—	P-51	
41?	15 March 1944	—	P-38		49	13 April 1944	13:50	B-17	PQ 05 Ost S/RS/SS, vicinity of Darmstadt
– Stab I. Gruppe of Jagdgeschwader 1 – Defense of the Reich — 17 April – 27 December 1944
50	13 May 1944	13:40? (Note: According to Mathews and Foreman claimed at 13:45.)	P-47	PQ 15 Ost N/TD, vicinity of Fehmarn	51?	23 December 1944	—	P-47	
51	19 May 1944	13:00? (Note: According to Mathews and Foreman claimed at 13:12.)	B-24	PQ 05 Ost S/FT/FU, south of Verden	52	25 December 1944	—	B-24	
? (Note: This claim is not listed by Prien and Rodeike.)	21 November 1944	12:10	B-17	Gotha-Erfurt					

=== Awards ===
- Spanish Cross in Silver with Swords (14 April 1939)
- Iron Cross (1939) 2nd and 1st Class
- German Cross in Gold on 24 October 1943 as Leutnant in the II./Jagdgeschwader 1
- Knight's Cross of the Iron Cross on 9 June 1944 as Oberleutnant and Staffelkapitän of the 3./Jagdgeschwader 1 "Oesau"

Ehlers was nominated for the posthumous Knight's Cross of the Iron Cross with Oak Leaves (Ritterkreuz des Eisernen Kreuzes mit Eichenlaub). This nomination was not approved.
