= Howard Blatchford =

Canadian flying ace (1912–1943)

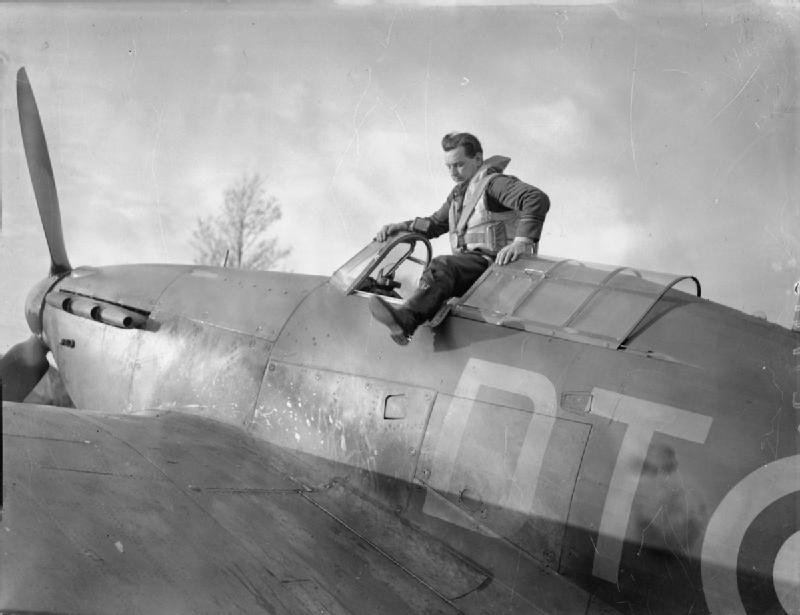
- Flight Lieutenant H P "Cowboy" Blatchford of No. 257 Squadron RAF climbing out of his Hawker Hurricane Mark I at RAF Martlesham Heath, Suffolk.
- Born: Howard Peter Blatchford; 25 February 1912; Edmonton, Alberta, Canada
- Died: 3 May 1943 (aged 31); Amsterdam, German-occupied Netherlands
- Military career
- Allegiance: United Kingdom
- Branch: Royal Air Force
- Service years: 1936–1943
- Rank: Wing Commander
- Units: No. 41 Squadron RAF; No. 212 Squadron RAF; No. 17 Squadron RAF; No. 257 Squadron RAF; Digby Wing; Coltishall Wing
- Conflicts: World War II
- Awards: Distinguished Flying Cross

Wing Commander Howard Peter "Cowboy" Blatchford DFC (25 February 1912 – 3 May 1943) was a flying ace, who achieved the first Canadian victory in World War II.

Blatchford was born in Edmonton, Alberta on 25 February 1912, and enlisted in the Royal Air Force in February 1936. He was posted to No. 41 Squadron RAF in early 1937. In April 1940 he was posted to No. 212 Squadron RAF, flying photo-reconnaissance operations. In June he joined the Photographic Development Unit as a flight commander, later transferring to No. 17 Squadron RAF in September, flying Hawker Hurricanes. He soon joined No. 257 Squadron RAF, under the command of Squadron Leader Robert Stanford Tuck.

In December 1940, Blatchford was awarded the Distinguished Flying Cross:

Flight Lieutenant Howard Peter BLATCHFORD (37715), No. 257 Squadron. In November, 1940, this officer was the leader of a squadron which destroyed eight and damaged a further five enemy aircraft in one day. In the course of the combat he rammed and damaged a hostile fighter when his ammunition was expended, and then made two determined head-on feint attacks on enemy fighters, which drove them off. He has shown magnificent leadership and outstanding courage.

Blatchford became commanding officer of No. 257 Squadron RAF in July 1941. He was promoted to wing commander in September that year, becoming wing leader of the Digby Wing. On 23 September 1941, John Gillespie Magee, the author of the famous flying poem "High Flight," arrived at Digby for his first operational posting, on RCAF 412 Squadron. On 12 October 1941, Magee's squadron moved from the Digby aerodrome to the nearby RAF Wellingore, from which he was operating when he died. Blatchford finished his tour of duty in April 1942, returning to operations in February 1943 as wing leader of the Coltishall Wing. On 29 March 1943 his Spitfires propeller was hit by Flak splinters during morning sortie (ca. 08.45-10.30), FB/Cat.A, but he landed safely. On 4 April 1943 while leading 167 Squadron on a sortie escorting 24 Lockheed Venturas attacking Rotterdam, his Spitfire was severely hit by a Jagdgeschwader 1 fighter with cannon and machine gun fire.

Leading the Coltishall Wing to escort bombers attacking a power station in Amsterdam, Blatchford was shot down and killed in action on 3 May 1943 by Obfw. Hans Ehlers of II Gruppe, JG1. His body was never found. He is commemorated on the Air Forces Memorial at Runnymede.

At the time of his death, Blatchford had claimed five aircraft shot down, three shared aircraft shot down, three "probables", four damaged and one shared damaged.
