= Bereborn =

- Municipality
- Coat of arms

- Location of Bereborn within Vulkaneifel district
- Interactive map of Bereborn
- Location within Germany Location within Rhineland-Palatinate
- Coordinates: 50°16′55″N 6°58′26″E
- Country: Germany
- State: Rhineland-Palatinate
- District: Vulkaneifel
- Municipal assoc.: Kelberg

Government
  - Mayor (2019–24): Johannes Schu

Area
  - Total: 2.57 km^{2} (0.99 sq mi)
- Elevation: 503 m (1,650 ft)

Population (2025-12-31)
  - Total: 124
  - Density: 48.2/km^{2} (125/sq mi)
- Time zone: UTC+01:00 (CET)
  - Summer (DST): UTC+02:00 (CEST)
- Postal codes: 56769
- Dialling codes: 02692
- Vehicle registration: DAU
- Website: www.bereborn.de

Bereborn is an Ortsgemeinde – a municipality belonging to a Verbandsgemeinde, a kind of collective municipality – in the Vulkaneifel district in Rhineland-Palatinate, Germany. It belongs to the Verbandsgemeinde of Kelberg, whose seat is in the like-named municipality.

== Geography ==
The municipality lies in the High Eifel at the foot of the Hochkelberg nature conservation area, some 18 km northeast of the district seat of Daun. North of the village rises the Elzbach.

== History ==
In the Middle Ages, Bereborn belonged to the County of Virneburg. Under Napoleonic occupation, the village was in the Mairie (“Mayoralty”) of Virneburg.

In the course of administrative restructuring in Rhineland-Palatinate, Bereborn was transferred in 1970 from the Mayen district to the Daun district, now known as the Vulkaneifel district.

== Politics ==
=== Municipal council ===
The council is made up of 6 council members, who were elected by majority vote at the municipal election held on 7 June 2009, and the honorary mayor as chairman.

=== Coat of arms ===
The German blazon reads: Von Silber und Blau geteilt, oben 7 (4:3) rote Rauten, unten einen silbernen Ziehbrunnen.

The municipality's arms might in English heraldic language be described thus: Per fess argent seven lozenges gules, four and three, and azure a well masoned with winch and pail, all of the first.

In feudal times, Bereborn belonged to the County of Virneburg whose lords bore the seven-lozenge charge in their arms. This has been adopted in Bereborn's arms. The well is canting and refers to the placename ending —born – cognate with the English “bourn(e)” – which in the local dialect can mean “well” (in High German, the word is Brunnen; the English cognate means “stream” or “brook”).

== Culture and sightseeing ==
=== Buildings ===
- Catholic church at Dorfstraße 11 – biaxial aisleless church from 1777

=== Natural monuments ===
In the village centre, the Kaiserlinde (“Emperor’s limetree”) with a memorial stone recalls the one hundredth anniversary of the victory over Napoleon at the Battle of Leipzig in 1813.

== Economy and infrastructure ==
=== Transport ===
To the north, Bundesstraße 410 runs by the municipality.
