= Heinrich Bär =

German Luftwaffe flying ace (1913–1957)

Heinz Bär
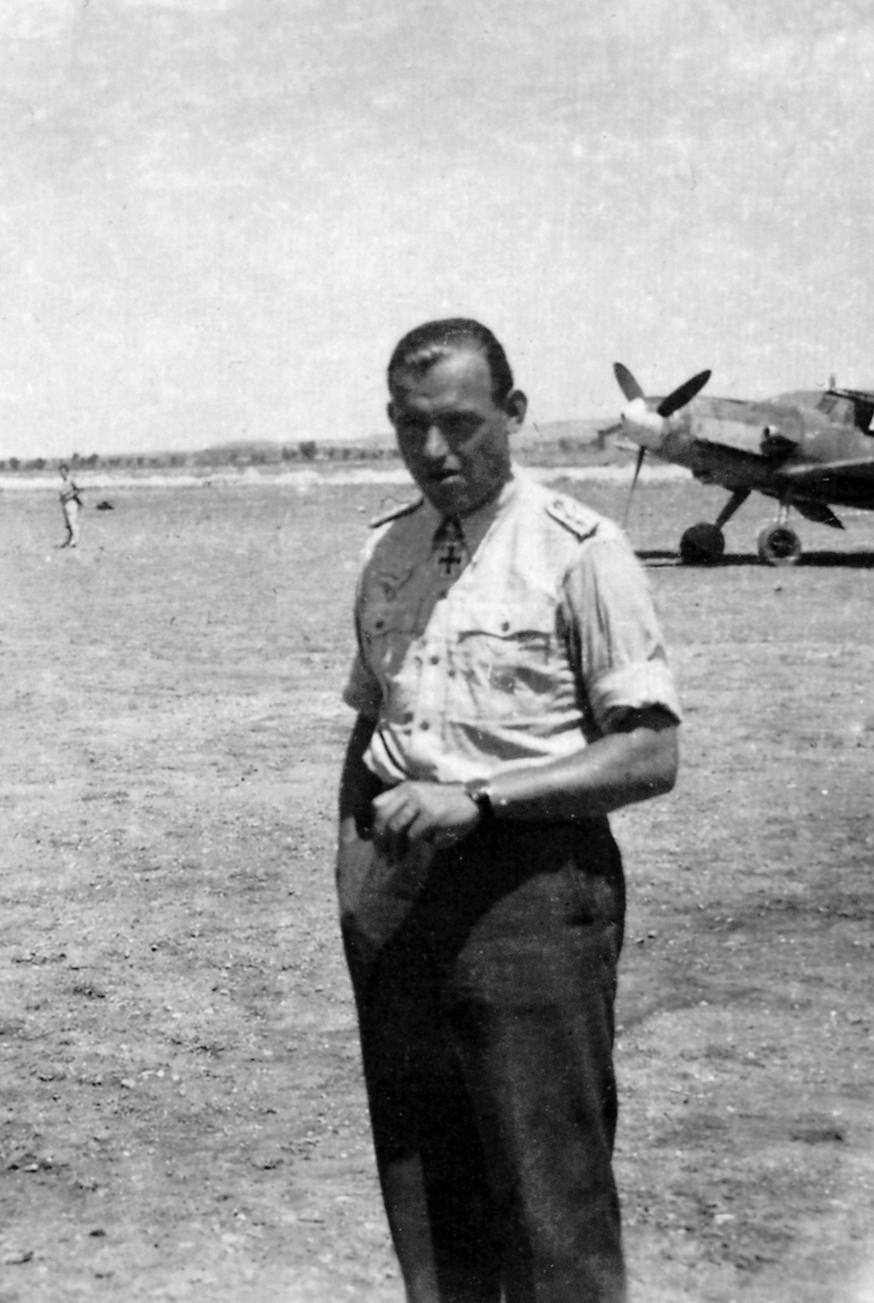
- Born: Oskar-Heinz Bär; 25 May 1913; Sommerfeld, Kingdom of Saxony, German Empire
- Died: 28 April 1957 (aged 43); Braunschweig, Lower Saxony, West Germany
- Military career
- Allegiance: Nazi Germany
- Branch: Luftwaffe
- Service years: 1934–1945
- Rank: Oberstleutnant (Lieutenant Colonel)
- Nickname: Pritzl
- Units: JG 51, JG 77, JGr Süd, JG 1, JG 3, EJG 2 and JV 44
- Commands: 12./JG 51, I./JG 77, JGr Süd, II./JG 1, JG 3, III./EJG 2 and JV 44
- Conflicts: See battles World War II: Battle of France; Battle of Britain; Operation Barbarossa; Crimean Campaign; Eastern Front; Mediterranean theater; Unternehmen Bodenplatte; Defense of the Reich
- Awards: Knight's Cross of the Iron Cross with Oak Leaves and Swords
- Other work: Test pilot

Oskar-Heinrich "Pritzl" Bär (pronounced [ˈhaɪnʁɪç ˈbɛːɐ̯]; 25 May 1913 – 28 April 1957) was a German Luftwaffe flying ace who served throughout World War II in Europe. Bär flew more than one thousand combat missions, and fought in the Western, Eastern and Mediterranean theatres. On 18 occasions he survived being shot down, and according to records in the German Federal Archives, he claimed to have shot down 228 enemy aircraft and was credited with 208 aerial victories, 16 of which were in a Messerschmitt Me 262 jet fighter. Sources credit him with 220 – 96 on Eastern Theatre and 124 on Western Theatre – up to 222 aerial victories may also be possible.

Bär, a native of Saxony, joined the Reichswehr in 1934 and transferred to the Luftwaffe in 1935. Serving first as a mechanic, then as a pilot on transport aircraft, he was informally trained as a fighter pilot. He claimed his first aerial victory in September 1939 on the French border. By the end of the Battle of Britain, his tally of victories had increased to 17. Transferred to the Eastern Front to participate in Operation Barbarossa, he quickly accumulated further victories, a feat that earned him the Knight's Cross of the Iron Cross with Oak Leaves and Swords for 90 aerial victories in February 1942.

During the remainder of World War II, Bär was credited with 130 other aerial victories, an achievement which would normally have earned him the coveted Knight's Cross of the Iron Cross with Oak Leaves, Swords and Diamonds. After World War II, Bär continued his career as an aviator. He was killed in a flying accident on 28 April 1957 near Braunschweig.

== Early life ==
Bär was born on 25 May 1913 in Sommerfeld, present-day part of Leipzig, in the Kingdom of Saxony, a federated state of the German Empire. His parents were farmers, and in 1916, his father was killed in action on the Western Front of World War I. Bär attended the Volksschule, a combined primary and lower secondary school, in Sommerfeld. Initially, he planned on taking over the family farm in Engelsdorf and following graduation attended the agriculture school in Wurzen. Aged 15, he became a glider pilot, joining the glider club on the "Schwarzer Berg" (Black Mountain) at Taucha. Bär then wanted to become a forester, for everything associated with wildlife and forests interested him. His first sight of a Junkers transport aircraft changed his mind and convinced him that he should become an aviator. As a teenager, he had ambitions to become an airline pilot with Deutsche Luft Hansa. He acquired the nickname Pritzl because of his affection for Pritzl candy bars.

The financial difficulties during the Great Depression prevented Bär from gaining a civil pilot license; three separate licenses were required by airlines. In 1934, he joined the Reichswehr and was assigned to the 3. Kompanie of Kraftfahrabteilung 4 (3rd Company of the 4th Motor Vehicle Battalion) as a mechanic. He served in this position until the following year, when he was transferred to a combat wing of the Luftwaffe. A few months later, he was accepted for pilot training, receiving his transport aircraft pilot's training. (Note: Flight training in the Luftwaffe progressed through the levels A1, A2 and B1, B2, referred to as A/B flight training. A training included theoretical and practical training in aerobatics, navigation, long-distance flights and dead-stick landings. The B courses included high-altitude flights, instrument flights, night landings and training to handle the aircraft in difficult situations. For pilots destined to fly multi-engine aircraft, the training was completed with the Luftwaffe Advanced Pilot's Certificate (Erweiterter Luftwaffen-Flugzeugführerschein), also known as C-Certificate.) From 1 November 1937 to 31 March 1938, Bär attended the flight school at Oldenburg and was then transferred to the flight school at Hildesheim. He was transferred again, attending the flight school at Ludwigslust where he attained his Luftwaffe Advanced Pilot's Certificate (Erweiterter Luftwaffen-Flugzeugführerschein), also known as 'C'-Certificate, confirming proficiency on multi-engine aircraft, on 16 May 1938. Bär then attended the blind flying school Blindflugschule 2 (BFS 2—2nd blind flying school) at Neuburg an der Donau from 7 July to 14 August 1938. He was transferred to I./Jagdgeschwader 135, the core of the future Jagdgeschwader 51 (JG 51), on 1 September 1938, usually flying the Junkers Ju 86. (Note: For an explanation of the meaning of Luftwaffe unit designation see Organisation of the Luftwaffe during World War II.) The Squadron Leader (Staffelkapitän) Douglas Pitcairn noticed Bär's flying talents and tried to convince Bär to become a fighter pilot. Initially Bär refused, but after he illegally conducted some aerobatics in the Ju 86 leading to an engine failure, he reluctantly accepted and became a fighter pilot.

== World War II ==
Stationed on the border with France, Bär achieved his first victory—a Curtiss P-36 Hawk—on 25 September 1939 during the Phoney War air skirmishes with the Armée de l'Air (French Air Force). This earned him the Iron Cross 2nd Class (Eisernes Kreuz zweiter Klasse) on 29 September 1939 which was presented to him by Hugo Sperrle. During the Battle of France, he was credited with two more aerial victories before adding a further 10 during the Battle of Britain and was awarded the Iron Cross 1st Class (Eisernes Kreuz erster Klasse) on 6 July 1940. During this time, he had several emergency landings in badly damaged aircraft and was shot down over the English Channel on 2 September 1940 by a Spitfire. Bär was summoned to appear before Hermann Göring and report on this battle. (Note: Sources are inconclusive with respect to whether Göring had witnessed the incident personally or whether it was reported to him on 8 September 1940 by Werner Mölders.) When Göring asked him what he was thinking about while in the water, Bär immediately replied, "Your speech, Herr Reichsmarschall, in which you said that England is no longer an island!", alluding to an address that Göring had made before the German fighter pilots. Incidents like this are testimony to his often blatant disregard for higher authority. His outspokenness frequently landed him in trouble with Göring. In early 1941, he was credited with an additional four aerial victories against the Royal Air Force (RAF), bringing his total to 17.

=== Eastern Front ===
In preparation for Operation Barbarossa, the German invasion of the Soviet Union, I. Gruppe relocated to Starawieś on 10 June. On the morning of 22 June, Bär and his wingman Oberfeldwebel Heinrich Höfemeier were escorting a damaged Heinkel He 111 over German lines when they made contact with 18 Tupolev SB bombers from the 39 SBAP (Skorostnoy Bombardirovohchnyy Aviatsionny Polk—high speed bomber aviation regiment) and 10 SAD (Smeshannaya Aviatsionnaya Diviziya—composite aviation regiment). The German pilots attacked; Höfemeier claimed four, Bär two—though the former was wounded in the arm. The Germans noted the vulnerability of the Soviet aircraft which lacked self-sealing fuel tanks and had a propensity to burst into flames. More JG 51 Bf 109s appeared and claimed six more. None of the 18 bombers returned home. Bär had achieved his 19th and 20th victories.

JG 51 at the time was part of Fliegerkorps II, operating in the central sector of the Eastern Front. Bär claimed five aerial victories on 30 June 1941, bringing his total to 22. On that day JG 51 was credited with 113 aerial victories in total, among them their 1,000th aerial victory—the first unit to reach this figure—and Oberst Werner Mölders, with 82 aerial victories, surpassed Manfred von Richthofen in number of victories. The Geschwader recorded 24 separate engagements in a 14-hour period and lost five Bf 109s. Bär's opponents included Ilyushin DB-3 bombers from the 42nd and 52nd DBA (Dal'me-Bombardirovochnaya Aviatsiya—long range aviation bomber regiment). Five Tupolev TB-3s from the 3rd TBAP were also claimed.

Within two weeks of combat against the Soviet Air Force, Bär's tally rose to 27, which earned him the Knight's Cross of the Iron Cross (Ritterkreuz des Eisernen Kreuzes) on 2 July, followed by his promotion to Oberleutnant on 1 August 1941. On 5 July, Bär or Mölders may also have shot down the Soviet fighter ace Podpolkovnik (Lieutenant Colonel) Stepan Suprun from the 401 IAP (Istrebitel'nyy Aviatsionyy Polk—fighter aviation regiment) and holder of the Hero of the Soviet Union.

=== Squadron leader ===
On 20 July 1941, Bär was transferred to IV. Gruppe of JG 51 where he was appointed Staffelkapitän of 12. Staffel. He succeeded Hauptmann Karl-Gottfried Nordmann who had been placed in command of IV. Gruppe. Bär accounted for a Petlyakov Pe-2 on 23 July. Three were lost from the 411 BAP (Bombardirovochnyy Aviatsionyy Polk—bomber aviation regiment) operating under the OSNAZ (Osoboye Naznachenie—Special purpose-unit or task force). German pilots submitted three claims. On 9 August a SB bomber was claimed from a formation of eight belonging to the 57 BAP's 3rd Eskadrilya—five Soviet aircraft were shot down. Bär had achieved his 55th victory.

"A very good pilot in any of these aircraft was tough to handle, and if he had the tactical advantage, he had a good chance to win the fight. You see from my own eighteen experiences as someone else's victory, that they often did win."

— Heinrich Bär on the quality of Allied fighters.

On 14 August, he was awarded the Knight's Cross of the Iron Cross with Oak Leaves (Ritterkreuz des Eisernen Kreuzes mit Eichenlaub) for achieving 60 victories, and on 30 August he became an "ace-in-a-day" by shooting down six Soviet aircraft. On 31 August, Bär was shot down in his Bf 109 F-2 (Werknummer 8318—factory number) by an Ilyushin Il-2 some 25 kilometers (16 mi) northeast of Novgorod-Seversky, resulting in an emergency landing. He suffered injuries to his back and feet while bailing out. Bär evaded Soviet patrols which rushed to the crash site. Bär remained in hiding through to the following night. He turned his leather jacket inside-out and discarded his flying boots to present himself as a Russian peasant. Vanity prevented him from throwing away the Knight's Cross and Oak Leaves and he hid the items. Bär eventually made it to German lines but aggravated his injuries and spent two months in hospital. During his convalescence, 12. Staffel was temporarily led by Leutnant Bernd Gallowitsch.

Bär was promoted to Hauptmann in late 1941 and appointed Squadron Leader of 12./JG 51 in early 1942. By late 1941, after Mölders (115), Lützow (100), Galland (96) and Gollob (85), Bär's 80 placed him among the leading pilots of the war. His longtime wingman at the time was Heinrich Hoffmann. From January he was appointed Gruppenkommandeur (Group Commander) of IV Gruppe. At this time, JG 51 was only the second of two fighter groups that continued to operate the Bf 109E in winter 1941. He received the Knight's Cross of the Iron Cross with Oak Leaves and Swords (Ritterkreuz des Eisernen Kreuzes mit Eichenlaub und Schwertern) on 16 February as his tally rose to 90. This achievement was mentioned in the daily Wehrmachtbericht propaganda bulletin on 12 February 1942, his first of three references during the course of the war. Three months later he was referenced again.

On 11 May, Bär was transferred from IV./JG 51 on the Moscow front to take command of I. Gruppe of Gordon Gollob's Jagdgeschwader 77 (JG 77) flying wing. Bär replaced Herbert Ihlefeld who had been transferred. JG 77 was tasked with supporting the hard fighting in the Crimean Campaign over the Kerch Strait on the Crimean Peninsula. Led by the flying aces (Experten) Gollob and Bär, JG 77 took over the air space above Kerch-Taman as Gollob and Bär shot down two and three LaGG-3s respectively, raising Bär's victory total to 93. Mutual animosity between the two men, Gollob, a disciplinarian pro-Nazi, and Bär, an anti-authoritarian, ensured an intense rivalry. On 19 May 1942, Bär claimed five further aerial victories—including a Polikarpov R-5 in the morning and four Polikarpov I-16s in one afternoon mission: his victory total now stood at 103. He was the 9th Luftwaffe pilot to achieve the century mark. That same day, Inspector of Fighters (General der Jagdflieger) Adolf Galland arrived to inspect Bär's I./JG 77 and JG 77 surpassed 2,000 victories. This flying achievement earned Bär a second mention in the daily Wehrmachtbericht on 20 May 1942.

=== Mediterranean theater ===
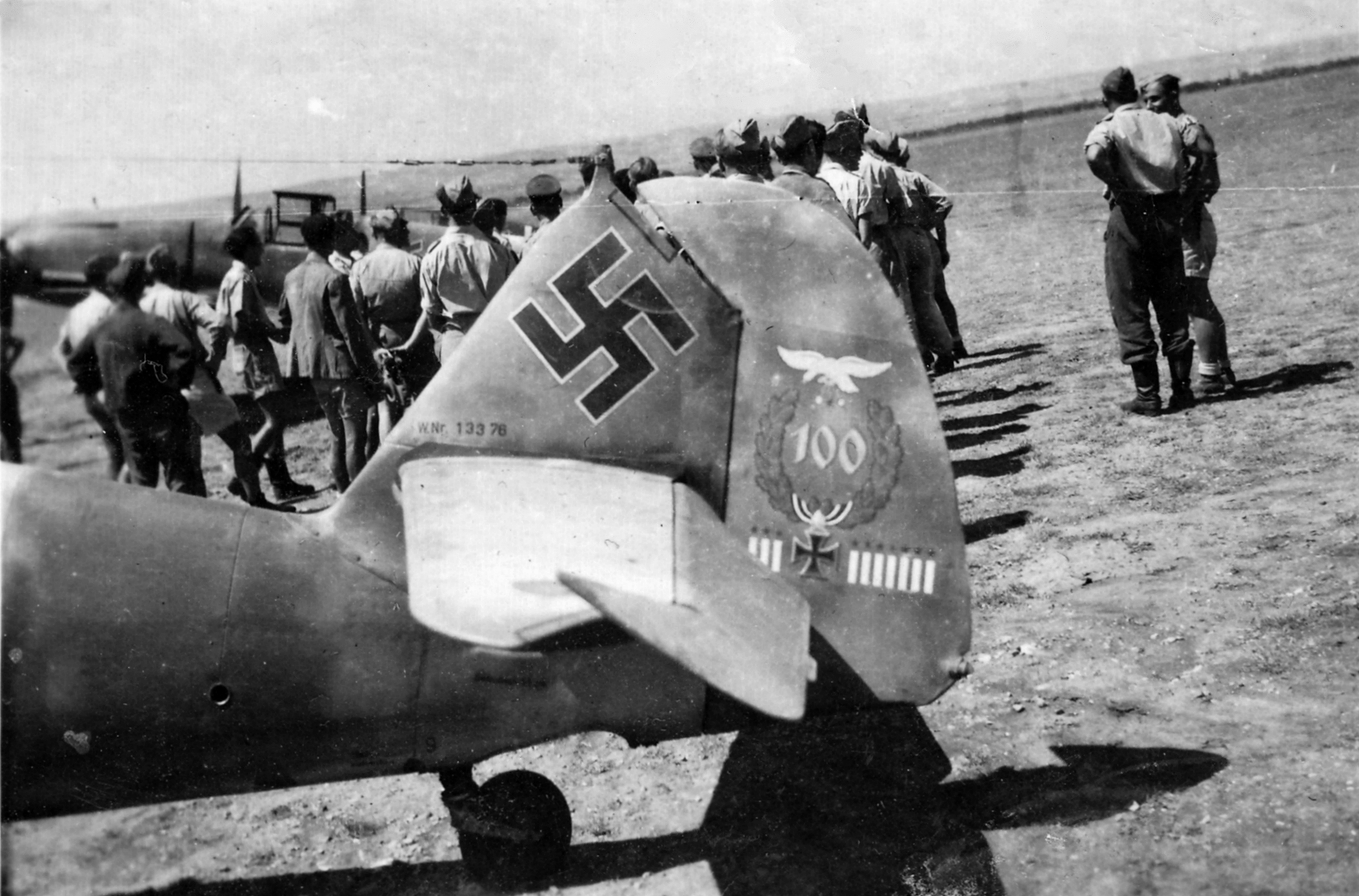
Tail of Bär's Messerschmitt Bf 109F-4 with the Stab I./JG 77

In June 1942, JG 77 was moved to the Mediterranean theater and took part in the air battles over Malta before relocating to Tunisia and participating in the North African campaign. On 13 October 1942 he accounted for three Spitfire fighters from 185 and 1345 Squadron near the Sicilian coast. I./JG 77 soon transferred to North Africa and took part in the Tunisian Campaign.

On 1 January 1943 Bär submitted one of two claims against 12 Curtiss P-40 Warhawks of 3 Squadron RAAF. Flying Officer Ritchie and Sergeant Roediger were lost but Bär did not receive credit. Bär claimed two B-25 Mitchell bombers and three P-40s on 14 January which do not appear to have been credited. Two claims for P-40s destroyed on 18 January were also not granted.

On 25 January 1943, Bär claimed two Curtiss P-40 Kittyhawk/Warhawk fighters, taking his total to 149 aerial victories. The Allied units involved were 112 Sqn RAF, 450 Sqn RAAF, 65th FS, USAAF and 66th FS, USAAF. (A South African bomber squadron, 21 Squadron SAAF, was also reportedly involved.) The Germans claimed 10 P-40s. 450 and 112 Squadrons lost one each while the 65th Squadron lost three and the 66th two. After Bär achieved his 149th aerial victory, General Hans-Jürgen von Arnim submitted him for the Knight's Cross of the Iron Cross with Oak Leaves, Swords and Diamonds. Reichsmarschall Hermann Göring ignored this request, denying Bär the "Diamonds". The reason for this remains uncertain, but it is believed that Göring disliked Bär for his insubordinate character and strong Upper Saxon dialect, which Göring was known to detest. On 27 January 1943, Bär surpassed the 150 aerial victory mark. Bär's opponents were probably USAAF P-40s and P-39 Airacobras from the 33rd and 81st Fighter Group.

On 4 February Bär led I. Gruppe into action against Boeing B-17 Flying Fortress bombers from the 97th and 301st Bomb Group and their Lockheed P-38 Lightning escorts from the 1st Fighter Group. Bär claimed one B-17. On 15 February Bär claimed two USAAF Spitfires. The American pilots were possibly Lieutenant Joe Reed and H. E Huntingdon from the 31st Fighter Group. After an uncredited claim on 24 February over a P-40 Bär accounted for five on two days later. German fighter units claimed 13 against an actual 14 (possible 15) and several more damaged. Seven of the British pilots were unhurt. The following day he was credited with another P-40 in combat with 11 pilots from 4 Squadron SAAF. Records suggest he may have claimed three but was only credited with one.

"He was honest through and through. Whatever he told you was the truth. He never tried to cover things up as some pilots did."

— Günther Rall, Chief of the Air Staff of the post-war German Air Force

Bär and his I. Gruppe of JG 77 operated from Fatnassa, Tunisia, in early March 1943. On 1 or 2 March, Bär claimed a Spitfire shot down. Then in the evening met Galland, who was making a surprise visit to I. Gruppe of JG 77. Galland was greeted by Major Joachim Müncheberg, who introduced Bär to Galland. Thus began a comradeship which outlasted World War II. On 6 March 92 Squadron Spitfires provided cover for 1 SAAF Squadron. They were supported by 601. Bär spotted their approach and climbed then dived onto the British. Bär accounted for two Spitfires—Flight Sergeant Tilston, from 601, was forced to bail out and Flying Officer Mahon from the South African unit was killed.

Over North Africa and the Mediterranean theater, Bär had increased his tally to 179, but, fighting a losing battle against ever-increasing Allied air superiority, Bär lost his fighting spirit, and suffered severe mental and physical exhaustion. After several arguments with Hermann Göring and JG 77's new commander, Oberst Johannes Steinhoff, in mid-1943 Bär was transferred to France "for cowardice before the enemy" and demoted to squadron leader. He took over command of an operational training unit, Jagdgruppe Süd. On 6 August, Bär was officially relieved of command and temporarily succeeded by Oberleutnant Armin Köhler as commander of I. Gruppe of JG 77 before Hauptmann Lutz-Wilhelm Burckhardt was given command on 19 August.

=== Defense of the Reich ===
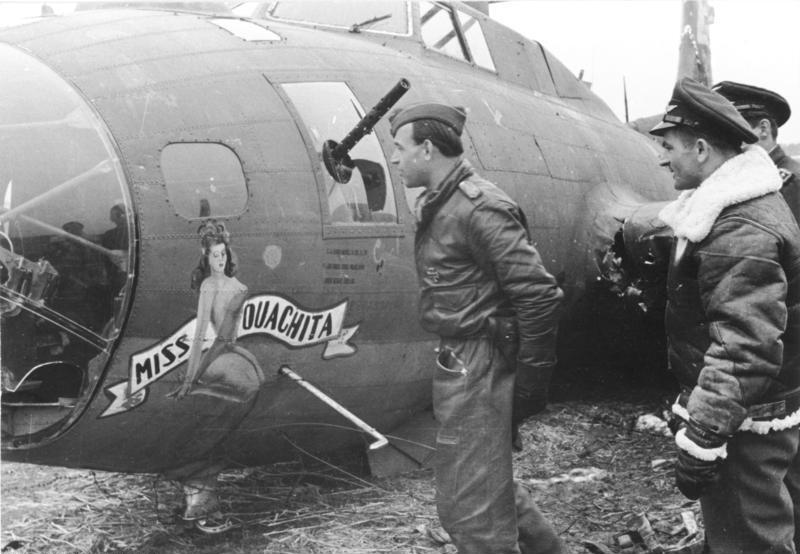
Bär inspecting his 184th aerial victory, a Boeing B-17F of 91st Bomb Group on 21 February 1944. His wingman Leo Schuhmacher is standing to his right.

His combat skills were hard to overlook and hence Bär was transferred to Jagdgeschwader 1 (JG 1) on 20 December 1943, replacing Leutnant Kurt Ibing as commander of 11./JG 1. In early January 1944, 11./JG 1, also known as the Höhenstaffel, a high altitude squadron, was disbanded and its pilots assigned to II. and III. Gruppe of JG 1. Bär, who was assigned to 6./JG 1 as an ordinary pilot, logged his first flight with II. Gruppe on 4 January. At the time, 6./JG 1 was under command of Burckhardt who had also been demoted while serving with JG 77. Steinhoff's disciplinary action also included the pilots Leutnant Ernst-Wilhelm Reinert, Oberfeldwebel Alexander Preinfalk, and Oberfeldwebel Herbert Kaiser for redemption in combat. Jagdgeschwader 1 (JG 1) Wing Commander (Geschwaderkommodore) Colonel Walter Oesau welcomed him with a reminder that he had promised Oberkommando der Luftwaffe (OKL) Göring that Bär would not be given any command responsibilities. Although Bär accepted this with humor, he later commented to others that in the air he was the "Kommodore of his own crate". On 19 February, Bär replaced Burkhardt, who was transferred, as commander of 6./JG 1.

On 15 March 1944, Bär, now a Major and rehabilitated from the demotion, was given command of II./JG 1. This was after the death of Hauptmann Hermann Segatz on 8 March 1944. JG 1 was tasked with Reichsverteidigung (Defense of the Reich) and equipped with the Focke-Wulf Fw 190 A-7 fighter. Morale of the group soared following his appointment. He was considered the unofficial leader of the group and the best officer in the entire Geschwader. In consequence, command of 6./JG 1 went to Oberleutnant Georg-Peter Eder. On 11 April 1944, Bär achieved his 199th aerial victory over a B-17 near Fallersleben. That day, the USAAF Eighth Air Force sent 917 heavy bombers against the German aircraft industry in Oschersleben, Bernburg, Halberstadt, Sorau, present-day Żary, Poland, Cottbus and Arnimswalde, present-day Załom, Poland. His 200th aerial victory, a Consolidated B-24 Liberator, was claimed on 22 April accompanied by his regular wingman Warrant Officer (Oberfeldwebel) Leo Schuhmacher, who would be awarded the Knight's Cross of the Iron Cross on 1 March 1945 as a fighter pilot in II./JG 1. Bär had just landed at Störmede airfield from a II./JG 1 intercept when a smoking United States Army Air Forces (USAAF) B-24 of the 458th Bombardment Group passed overhead. Bär and his wingman quickly got into their aircraft and intercepted the B-24. The bomber's gunners had already bailed out of the aircraft, making it an easy aerial victory. Bär returned to Störmede airfield to the congratulations of his men. This double century victory earned Bär his third and final reference in the Wehrmachtbericht on 24 April 1944. After Oesau's death on 11 May 1944, Bär was made acting Wing Commander of JG 1. In June, he was appointed Wing Commander of Jagdgeschwader 3 (JG 3) following the death of Friedrich-Karl Müller. By the end of 1944, Bär's score had risen to 203.

Bär claimed his 204th and 205th victories against two Hawker Typhoons on 1 January 1945 during Operation Bodenplatte, a Luftwaffe mass attack against Allied airfields in the Benelux area. One of Bär's 'aerial kills' may not have been airborne. Historian Norman Franks states both aircraft, from No. 438 Squadron RAF, were taxiing when hit. Flight Lieutenant Pete Wilson was wounded and later died from his injuries after Bär's strafing attack. The second Typhoon did get airborne. Its pilot, Flight Officer Ross Keller, was killed. This version of events is contradicted by a witness, Pilot Officer 'Bill' Harle, who thought both aircraft were airborne.

=== Combat in the Me 262 ===
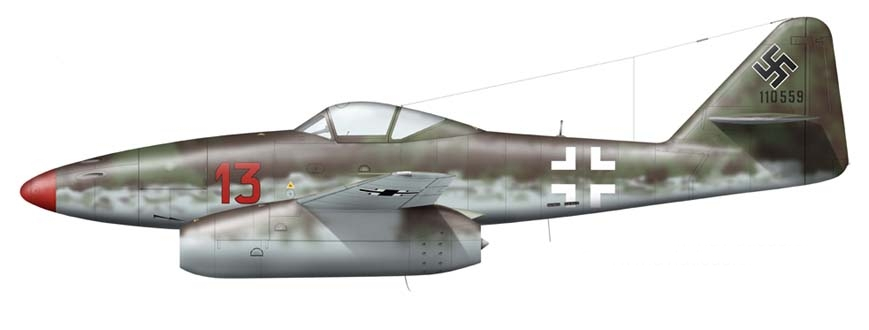
Messerschmitt Me 262 A-1a – EJG 2 – Major Heinz Bär

On 14 February, Bär was transferred to command the jet fighter training unit III. Gruppe of Ergänzungs-Jagdgeschwader 2 (EJG 2). In March, the unit was equipped with the Messerschmitt Me 262 fighter and sent into battle. Bär shot down 13 Allied aircraft, many of them heavy bombers like the B-17 and the B-24. EJG 2 abandoned Lechfeld Airfield for the airfield was under constant attack and became threatened by the United States Army.

On 23 April, Bär transferred to the elite Jet Experten unit Jagdverband 44 (JV 44), led by Adolf Galland. The following day Bär briefed JV 44 pilots in Galland's absence. The air defences had detected an incoming American formation and Bär instructed the jet pilots on the appropriate tactical approach to take when the interception was made. Klaus Neumann, Walter Krupinski and Günther Lützow flew on the mission. Lutzöw was posted missing in action and remains missing to date.

On 26 April, he assumed command of the unit after Galland was wounded. Bär possibly flew his first operational sortie with JV 44 on 27 April 1945. Flying the Me 262 A-1/U5, a six MK 108 cannon prototype, he was accompanied by Major Wilhelm Herget and the non-commissioned officer NCO (Unteroffizier) Franz Köster when the trio engaged American fighters over Munich-Riem Airfield; Bär claimed one aerial victory. While not flying operationally, Bär spent most of his time giving hasty instruction to the new pilots still being assigned to JV 44. With JV 44, he achieved his final four aerial victories (3 P-47s and 1 Mosquito) on 28 April, bringing his total to 220. All told, he had achieved 16 victories in the Me 262, making him the second most successful Jet Expert of the war, which he finished as a Lieutenant Colonel (Oberstleutnant). (Note: For a list of Luftwaffe Jet aces see List of German World War II jet aces)

During the final days of the Second World War in Europe, Lieutenant General (Generalleutnant) Adolf Galland attempted to surrender JV 44 to American forces from his hospital bed. At the same time, Air General (General der Flieger) Karl Koller had ordered JV 44 to relocate to Prague and continue fighting. Bär, as a Galland loyalist, attempted to ignore the order. Bär was further pressured to relocate JV 44 when Major General (Generalmajor) Dietrich Peltz, commander of IX. Fliegerkorps, and Colonel Hajo Herrmann, commander of 9. Flieger-Division (J), unexpectedly emerged at the control room in Maxglan on 2 May 1945. A heated and violent dispute erupted between Bär, Peltz and Herrmann, witnessed by Walter Krupinski. He later recalled that Bär responded with "Yes, sir, but we are under the command of Generalleutnant Galland, and I will only follow orders of Generalleutnant Galland!"—a final act of disobedience that Krupinski believed could have led to Bär being shot for insubordination.

In the early morning hours of 4 May 1945, Bär gathered the pilots of JV 44 for a final briefing. Bär ordered the remaining Me 262 destroyed before going into captivity and interrogation by US intelligence officers of the 1st Tactical Air Force's Air Prisoner of War Interrogation Unit, based at Heidelberg.

== After the war ==
Bär did not return to his home in Sommerfeld after World War II. He settled in Braunschweig, where he continued his career in aviation, including a lead position for motor-powered flight with the Deutscher Aero Club. He also worked as a consultant and test pilot in the field of sport aviation, testing aircraft before they went on the market. On 28 April 1957, while conducting a routine flight-check in a light aircraft, a LF-1 Zaunkönig, Bär put the aircraft into a flat spin, the final manoeuvre in the test process. The aircraft spun down to 50 meters (160 ft); unable to regain control, Bär was killed in the resulting crash at Braunschweig-Waggum.

== In fringe culture ==
The National-Zeitung, a far-right German newspaper, featured a portrayal of Bär in its series "Great German Soldiers: Immortal Heroes" in May 2000. The National-Zeitung glorified Bär's "reliability" and "bravado" and claimed that he was a "daredevil in the best sense". In Jagdgeschwader 51, the newspaper continued, he quickly gained fame and honour through daring actions; after his total of 18 kills, he had been "immediately back in action" with barely treated wounds. In the series, only soldiers loyal to the Nazi regime were honoured, in part through the use of linguistic formulas originally employed by the Wehrmacht and Nazi propaganda.

According to political scientist Fabian Virchow, the series fits "the idea of men focused on the deed and shaping the course of history in the interest of the 'national' or 'völkisch' community", an idea which is to be found on the far right. At the same time, Virchow argues, the characterizations point to a concept of masculinity whose very one-sided characteristics could be described by qualities such as "hardness", "sacrificial will", "heroism in the face of death", "bravery", "resilience", "dash" or "stamina".

== Summary of career ==
Bär, call sign "Bussard 1", flew more than 1,000 combat missions. His 220 confirmed aerial victories place him eighth on the overall list of aces. His claim of 124 aerial victories over Western-flown aircraft is second only to Hans-Joachim Marseille's total of 158; almost all of the latter's victories occurred in Africa. He achieved four victories during the Battle of France, 13 during the Battle of Britain, and 61 over Libya and Tunisia. On the Eastern Front he had claimed 96 aerial victories. At least 75 of his victories had been claimed against British- and American-flown aircraft over Europe, 16 of these while flying the Me 262 jet fighter. Also among these 75 aerial victories are 21 US heavy bombers and one Mosquito. Bär crash-landed or bailed out 18 times and was wounded three times in combat.

=== Aerial victory claims ===
According to US historian David T. Zabecki, Bär was credited with 221 aerial victories. Obermaier also lists him with 221 aerial victories. The highest figure is given by Aders and Held who list Bär with 222 aerial victory claims. According to Spick, as well as by Morgan and Weal, Bär was credited with 220 aerial victories. Mathews and Foreman, authors of Luftwaffe Aces – Biographies and Victory Claims, researched the German Federal Archives and found records for 208 aerial victory claims, plus 20 further unconfirmed claims. This figure includes 95 aerial victories on the Eastern Front and 113 on the Western Front, including 14 four-engined bombers and 15 victories with the Me 262 jet fighter.

=== Awards ===
- German Cross in Gold on 27 May 1942 as Hauptmann in the I./JG 77
- Combined Pilots-Observation Badge
- Honor Goblet of the Luftwaffe on 8 June 1942 as Hauptmann and Gruppenkommandeur
- Iron Cross (1939)
  - 2nd Class (29 September 1939)
  - 1st Class (6 July 1940)
- Knight's Cross of the Iron Cross with Oak Leaves and Swords
  - Knight's Cross on 2 July 1941 as pilot and Leutnant in the 1./JG 51 (Note: According to Scherzer as Leutnant of the Reserves.)
  - 31st Oak Leaves on 14 August 1941 as Leutnant and pilot in the 1./JG 51
  - 7th Swords on 16 February 1942 as Hauptmann and Staffelkapitän of the 1./JG 51 (Note: According to Scherzer as Hauptmann of the Reserves.)
- Three named references in the Wehrmachtbericht (12 February 1942, 20 May 1942, 24 April 1944)

Three times Bär was recommended for the Knight's Cross of the Iron Cross with Oak Leaves, Swords and Diamonds. All three commendations were denied by Hermann Göring because of his personal dislike of Bär. Bär shot down a further 130 enemy aircraft after he had received the Swords.

=== Dates of rank ===
4 April 1934:	Gefreiter
1 October 1939:	Feldwebel
1 August 1940:	Leutnant (Second Lieutenant), with a rank age dated 1 May 1940
14 August 1941:	Oberleutnant (First Lieutenant), with a rank age dated 1 August 1941
1 December 1941:	Hauptmann (Captain), with a rank age dated 1 September 1941
1 March 1943:	Major (Major), with a rank age dated 1 September 1942
1 January 1945:	Oberstleutnant (Lieutenant Colonel)

== Notes ==
Military offices
Preceded by Oberst Walter Oesau	Commander of Jagdgeschwader 1 Oesau; 12 May 1944 – 20 May 1944	Succeeded by Oberst Herbert Ihlefeld
Preceded by Major Friedrich Karl Müller	Commander of Jagdgeschwader 3 Udet; 1 June 1944 – 13 February 1945	Succeeded by Major Werner Schröer
Preceded by Generalleutnant Adolf Galland	Commander of Jagdverband 44; 26 April 1945 – 8 May 1945	Succeeded by none
