= Popielów =

Popielów may refer to:

- Popielów, Masovian Voivodeship, a village in Węgrów County, Masovian Voivodeship, Poland
- Popielów, Opole Voivodeship, a village in Opole County, Opole Voivodeship, Poland
