= Heinrich Höfemeier =

German fighter ace and Knight's Cross recipient

- Born: 21 August 1913; Langenholzhausen, Principality of Lippe
- Died: 7 August 1943 (aged 29); Karachev, Russia
- Cause of death: Killed in action
- Military career
- Allegiance: Nazi Germany
- Branch: Luftwaffe
- Service years: 1933–1943
- Rank: Oberleutnant (first lieutenant)
- Units: Condor Legion, JG 51
- Conflicts: Spanish Civil War World War II: Eastern Front
- Awards: Spanish Cross in Silver with Swords; Knight's Cross of the Iron Cross

Heinrich Höfemeier (21 August 1913 – 7 August 1943) was a Luftwaffe fighter ace and recipient of the Knight's Cross of the Iron Cross during World War II. He claimed 96 victories in 490 missions. All his victories were claimed over the Eastern Front. He was shot down and killed in action on 7 August 1943.

== Early life and career ==
Höfemeier was born on 21 August 1913 in Langenholzhausen, present-day part of Kalletal, then in the Principality of Lippe, a Federated State of the German Empire. On 1 May 1933, he joined the military service of the then still secret branch of the Luftwaffe. He was trained as a flight engineer and served with the ground staff of the Condor Legion during the Spanish Civil War. He was awarded the Spanish Cross in Silver with Swords (Spanienkreuz in Silber mit Schwertern), for his service in the Spanish Civil War.

== World War II ==
World War II in Europe had begun on Friday, 1 September 1939, when German forces invaded Poland. That month, Höfemeier began his flight and fighter pilot training. (Note: Flight training in the Luftwaffe progressed through the levels A1, A2 and B1, B2, referred to as A/B flight training. A training included theoretical and practical training in aerobatics, navigation, long-distance flights and dead-stick landings. The B courses included high-altitude flights, instrument flights, night landings and training to handle the aircraft in difficult situations.) On 22 March 1941, Höfemeier was posted to 1. Staffel (1st squadron) of Jagdgeschwader 51 (JG 51—51st Fighter Wing), a squadron of I. Gruppe (1st group) of JG 51. At the time, the Gruppe was commanded by Hauptmann Hermann-Friedrich Joppien and the Staffel was headed by Oberleutnant Fritz Eberle. Based at an airfield near Coquelles, the Gruppe was being equipped with the then new Messerschmitt Bf 109 F series. On 21 May, the Gruppe was withdrawn from operations at the English Channel and relocated to Krefeld Airfield for a short period of maintenance and overhaul.

=== War against the Soviet Union ===
In preparation for Operation Barbarossa, the German invasion of the Soviet Union, I. Gruppe relocated to Starawieś on 10 June. JG 51 area of operation during Operation Barbarossa was over the right flank of Army Group Center in the combat area of the 2nd Panzer Group as well as the 4th Army. On the morning of 22 June, Höfemeier and his wingman Leutnant Heinrich Bär were escorting a damaged Heinkel He 111 over German lines when they made contact with 18 Tupolev SB bombers from the 39 SBAP (Skorostnoy Bombardirovohchnyy Aviatsionny Polk—high speed bomber aviation regiment) and 10 SAD (Smeshannaya Aviatsionnaya Diviziya—composite aviation regiment). The German pilots attacked; Höfemeier claimed four, Bär two—though the former was wounded in the left arm when his Bf 109 F-2 (Werknummer 5423—factory number) was hit east of Siedlce. Höfemeier noted the vulnerability of the Soviet aircraft which lacked self-sealing fuel tanks and had a propensity to burst into flames. More JG 51 Bf 109s appeared and claimed six more. None of the 18 bombers returned home. Höfemeier had claimed his first four aerial victories.

On 19 March 1942, Höfemeier received the German Cross in Gold (Deutsches Kreuz in Gold). Less than three weeks later on 5 April, he was awarded the Knight's Cross of the Iron Cross (Ritterkreuz des Eisernen Kreuzes) for 41 aerial victories claimed. On 10 August, I. Gruppe of JG 51 was withdrawn from the Eastern Front and sent to Jesau, near present-day Bagrationovsk, to Heiligenbeil, present-day Mamonovo, to be reequipped with the Focke-Wulf Fw 190 A. The pilots were sent to Ergänzungs-Jagdgruppe West based at Cazaux, France for conversion training. Conversion completed, the Gruppe then relocated to Lyuban on 10 September. Here they came under control of Army Group North and fought in the area south of Lake Ladoga.

=== Instructor, back on the Eastern Front and death ===
On 20 March 1943, Höfemeier was transferred to Ergänzungs-Jagdgruppe Ost, a specialized training unit for new fighter pilots destined for the Eastern Front, where he served as a fighter pilot instructor. Serving in this capacity until 1 May, he then transferred to 3. Staffel of JG 51. At the time, I. Gruppe was commanded by Major Erich Leie and based at airfields near Bryansk and Oryol while 3. Staffel was led by Hauptmann Heinz Lange.

In July 1943, Höfemeiner fought in the offensive operations leading up to Operation Citadel, which initiated the Battle of Kursk. The battle began on 5 July with I. Gruppe of JG 51 supporting the German 9th Army in its northern attack on the Kursk salient. For the first days of the operation, I. Gruppe primary task was to provide fighter escort for the bombers of Kampfgeschwader 4, Kampfgeschwader 51 and Kampfgeschwader 53, as well as for the Junkers Ju 87 dive bombers of Sturzkampfgeschwader 1. On the first day of the Zitadelle, Höfemeier claimed his 75th aerial victory, a Lavochkin La-5 fighter shot down in the vicinity of Maloarkhangelsk.

On 7 August 1943, Höfemeier was shot down and killed in action when his Fw 190 A-4 "Brown 5" (Werknummer 5667) was hit by Soviet anti-aircraft artillery near Karachev. At the time, he had been the leading fighter pilot of I. Gruppe.

== Summary of career ==
=== Aerial victory claims ===
According to the US historian David Zabecki, Höfemeier was credited with 96 aerial victories. Spick also lists him with 96 aerial victories claimed in 490 combat missions, all of which on the Eastern Front. Matthews and Foreman, authors of Luftwaffe Aces — Biographies and Victory Claims, researched the German Federal Archives and state that he was credited with at least 59 aerial victories, all of which claimed on the Eastern Front.

Victory claims were logged to a map-reference (PQ = Planquadrat), for example "PQ 46161". The Luftwaffe grid map (Jägermeldenetz) covered all of Europe, western Russia and North Africa and was composed of rectangles measuring 15 minutes of latitude by 30 minutes of longitude, an area of about 360 square miles (930 km^{2}). These sectors were then subdivided into 36 smaller units to give a location area 3 km × 4 km (1.9 mi × 2.5 mi) in size.

Chronicle of aerial victories
This and the # (hash mark) indicates those aerial victories listed by Prien, Stemmer, Rodeike and Bock without an explicit sequence number. This and the ? (question mark) indicates information discrepancies listed by Prien, Stemmer, Rodeike, Bock, Mathews and Foreman.
| Claim | Date | Time | Type | Location | Claim | Date | Time | Type | Location |
– 1. Staffel of Jagdgeschwader 51 – Operation Barbarossa — 22 June – 5 December 1941
| 1 | 22 June 1941 | 09:40 | SB-2 | | 14 | 18 August 1941 | 16:20 | I-16 | |
| 2 | 22 June 1941 | 09:42 | SB-2 | | 15? (Note: This claim is not listed by Mathews and Foreman.) | 26 August 1941 | — | I-61 | |
| 3 | 22 June 1941 | 09:43 | SB-2 | Kossów-Siedlce | 16 | 3 October 1941 | 09:56 | I-61 (MiG-3) | |
| 4 | 22 June 1941 | 09:45 | SB-2 | Kossów-Siedlce | 17 | 6 October 1941 | 12:45 | Pe-2 | |
| 5 | 30 June 1941 | 15:20 | unknown | | 18 | 8 October 1941 | 08:30 | I-15 | |
| 6 | 30 June 1941 | 15:30 | Seversky | 20 km (12 mi) east of Babruysk | 19 | 11 October 1941 | 10:40? (Note: According to Mathews and Foreman claimed at 10:44.) | I-61 (MiG-3) | |
| 7 | 2 July 1941 | 08:25 | SB-2 | | 20 | 13 October 1941 | 13:20 | Il-2 | |
| 8 | 2 July 1941 | 08:28 | SB-2 | | 21 | 13 October 1941 | 13:21 | Il-2 | |
| 9 | 3 July 1941 | 17:45 | V-11 (Il-2) | | 22 | 13 October 1941 | 13:22 | Il-2 | |
| 10? | 6 July 1941 | — | V-11 | | 23 | 15 October 1941 | 07:25 | unknown | |
| 11 | 12 July 1941 | 18:55 | DB-3 | | 24 | 21 October 1941 | 16:05 | I-16 | |
| 12 | 22 July 1941 | 19:09 | Pe-2 | 30 km (19 mi) east of Loswiza | 25 | 29 October 1941 | 08:20 | I-61 (MiG-3) | |
| 13 | 12 August 1941 | 11:15 | V-11 (Il-2) | 10 km (6.2 mi) southeast of Chmanitschi | | | | | |
– 1. Staffel of Jagdgeschwader 51 – Eastern Front — 6 December 1941 – 3 February 1943
| # | 3 June 1942 | 18:59 | Pe-2 | | | | | | |
According to Prien, Stemmer, Rodeike and Bock, Höfemeier claimed 31 undocumented aerial victories before September 1942.
| 58? | 30 September 1942 | — | LaGG-3 | | 65 | 16 December 1942 | 12:15 | Pe-2 | 30 km (19 mi) northeast of Sychyovka |
| 59? | 30 September 1942 | — | LaGG-3 | | 66 | 17 December 1942 | 13:32 | Il-2 | 10 km (6.2 mi) northeast of Sychyovka |
| 60? | 1 October 1942 | — | MiG-3 | | 67 | 17 December 1942 | 14:04 | MiG-3 | PQ 46161; 10 km (6.2 mi) north of Konaja |
| 61 | 15 November 1942 | 08:21 | P-40 | PQ 55854; 15 km (9.3 mi) north of Kozelsk | 68 | 8 January 1943 | 08:10 | Il-2 | PQ 07673; 15 km (9.3 mi) northeast of Oryol |
| 62 | 14 December 1942 | 12:38 | Il-2 | vicinity of Durwjashki | 69 | 8 January 1943 | 08:11 | Il-2 | PQ 07673; 15 km (9.3 mi) northeast of Oryol |
| 63 | 16 December 1942 | 09:52 | Il-2 | 20 km (12 mi) northeast of Sychyovka | 70? | 18 January 1943 | 11:10 | MiG-3 | PQ 07754, Velikiye Luki |
| 64 | 16 December 1942 | 12:13 | Pe-2 | 25 km (16 mi) northeast of Sychyovka | | | | | |
– 3. Staffel of Jagdgeschwader 51 – Eastern Front — June – 7 August 1943
| 71 | 10 June 1943 | 19:20 | Il-2 | PQ 35 Ost 44591; 10 km (6.2 mi) northeast of Bryansk | 84 | 24 July 1943 | 04:07 | La-5 | PQ 35 Ost 63413; 20 km (12 mi) southeast of Zmiyovka |
| 72 | 10 June 1943 | 19:22 | Il-2 | PQ 35 Ost 44533; 15 km (9.3 mi) south of Dyatkovo | 85 | 25 July 1943 | 18:19 | Il-2 | PQ 35 Ost 53624; 15 km (9.3 mi) west of Trosna |
| 73 | 10 June 1943 | 19:29 | Il-2 | PQ 35 Ost 44471; 10 km (6.2 mi) south of Dyatkovo | 86 | 26 July 1943 | 11:10 | Il-2 m.H. (Note: The "m.H." refers to an Ilyushin Il-2 with rear gunner (mit Heckschütze).) | PQ 35 Ost 63182 vicinity of Zmiyovka |
| 74 | 26 June 1943 | 19:31 | MiG-3 | PQ 35 Ost 54181; 30 km (19 mi) east-northeast of Zhizdra | 87 | 31 July 1943 | 09:57 | La-5 | PQ 35 Ost 64543 |
| 75 | 5 July 1943 | 08:57 | La-5 | PQ 35 Ost 63614; 5 km (3.1 mi) northeast of Maloarkhangelsk | 88 | 31 July 1943 | 10:12 | LaGG-3 | PQ 35 Ost 54832 |
| 76 | 6 July 1943 | 13:50 | Il-2 | PQ 35 Ost 63584; 20 km (12 mi) southwest of Maloarkhangelsk | 89 | 1 August 1943 | 17:11 | Il-2 m.H. | PQ 35 Ost 54732 |
| 77 | 8 July 1943 | 03:57 | Il-2 | PQ 35 Ost 63712; 10 km (6.2 mi) east of Fatezh | 90 | 2 August 1943 | 11:47 | Boston | PQ 35 Ost 53452; 10 km (6.2 mi) southwest of Kromy |
| 78 | 8 July 1943 | 09:28 | Il-2 m.H. | PQ 35 Ost 63574; 20 km (12 mi) south-southeast of Trosna | 91 | 2 August 1943 | 18:30 | Il-2 m.H. | PQ 35 Ost 54789 |
| 79 | 11 July 1943 | 12:28 | LaGG-3? (Note: According to Mathews and Foreman claimed as a Lavochkin La-5.) | PQ 35 Ost 63443; 20 km (12 mi) north of Maloarkhangelsk | 92 | 2 August 1943 | 18:32 | Il-2 m.H. | PQ 35 Ost 54756 |
| 80 | 13 July 1943 | 12:59 | DB-3 | PQ 35 Ost 63239; 10 km (6.2 mi) east of Zalegoshch | 93 | 2 August 1943 | 18:35 | Il-2 m.H. | PQ 35 Ost 54725 |
| 81 | 13 July 1943 | 13:01 | DB-3 | PQ 35 Ost 63264; 25 km (16 mi) east-southeast of Zalegoshch | 94 | 3 August 1943 | 11:45 | Il-2 m.H. | PQ 35 Ost 54553 |
| 82 | 13 July 1943 | 13:05 | DB-3 | PQ 35 Ost 73148 | 95 | 3 August 1943 | 12:30 | Boston | PQ 35 Ost 53312 |
| 83 | 17 July 1943 | 16:47 | Il-2 | PQ 35 Ost 64865 | 96 | 5 August 1943 | 04:45 | Pe-2 | PQ 35 Ost 53185 |

=== Awards ===
- Spanish Cross in Silver with Swords
- Iron Cross (1939) 2nd and 1st Class
- Honor Goblet of the Luftwaffe on 30 September 1941 as Oberfeldwebel in a Jagdgeschwader (Note: According to Obermaier on 25 September 1941.)
- German Cross in Gold on 19 March 1942 as Oberfeldwebel in the I./Jagdgeschwader 51
- Knight's Cross of the Iron Cross on 5 April 1942 as Oberfeldwebel and pilot in the 1./Jagdgeschwader 51 "Mölders"
