= Leo Schuhmacher =

German Luftwaffe fighter pilot and Knight's Cross recipient (1914–1997)

- Born: 13 November 1914; Wiesental (Waghäusel)
- Died: 13 February 1997 (aged 82); Bruchsal
- Military career
- Allegiance: Nazi Germany
- Branch: Luftwaffe
- Rank: Leutnant (second lieutenant)
- Units: ZG 76, JG 1, JV 44
- Conflicts: World War II
- Awards: Knight's Cross of the Iron Cross

Leo Schuhmacher (13 November 1914 – 13 February 1997) was a Luftwaffe flying ace of World War II. Depending on source, Schuhmacher was credited between eight and 23 aerial victories, including 10 four engined bombers, claimed in approximately 250 combat missions.

== Early life and career ==
Schuhmacher was born on 13 November 1914 in Wiesental, then in the Grand Duchy of Baden within the German Empire, present-day part of Waghäusel. In 1934, he volunteered for military service in the Luftwaffe. Following flight and fighter pilot training, (Note: Flight training in the Luftwaffe progressed through the levels A1, A2 and B1, B2, referred to as A/B flight training. A training included theoretical and practical training in aerobatics, navigation, long-distance flights and dead-stick landings. The B courses included high-altitude flights, instrument flights, night landings, and training to handle the aircraft in difficult situations.) Schuhmacher was posted to Zerstörergeschwader 76 (ZG 76—76th Destroyer Wing) where he was assigned to 2. Staffel (2nd squadron).

== World War II ==
On Friday 1 September 1939, German forces invaded Poland starting World War II in Europe. At the time, Schuhmacher's 2. Staffel was under command of Oberleutnant Wolfgang Falck. I. Gruppe (1st group) of ZG 76, the Gruppe to which Schuhmacher's Staffel was subordinated, was equipped with the Messerschmitt Bf 110 heavy fighter. The Gruppe fought over Poland, the Battle of the Heligoland Bight on 18 December before it transferred to Norway. Here on 12 April 1940, Schuhmacher claimed a Vickers Wellington near Stavanger. In total, Schuhmacher claimed four aerial victories during the during the Norwegian campaign and Battle of Britain. For this, he was awarded both classes of Iron Cross (Eisernes Kreuz).

II. Gruppe emblem

From September 1940 to 1943, Schuhmacher served as a flight instructor. He was transferred to the II. Gruppe of Jagdgeschwader 1 (JG 1—1st Fighter Wing) in 1943 fighting in the Defense of the Reich. In early 1943, II. Gruppe was under command of Major Herbert Kijewski and based at Woensdrecht Airfield in the Netherlands.

On 18 March 1943, the United States Army Air Forces (USAAF) VIII Bomber Command attacked the Bremer Vulkan shipyard at Bremen-Vegesack. In total, 103 heavy bombers of the 1st and 2nd Bombardment Divisions were dispatched with 97 of which bombing the target area. I. Gruppe of JG 1 was scrambled at 14:42 and intercepted the bombers at 15:00 near Heligoland. At the same time, the Royal Air Force (RAF) dispatched a bomber formation against targets in the Netherland in order to dissipate the German defenses. At 15:16, nine Focke-Wulf Fw 190 of 6. Staffel of JG 1 were scrambled and intercept 20 Lockheed Ventura bombers escorted by approximately 30 to 40 Supermarine Spitfire fighters. In this encounter, the commander of 6. Staffel, Oberleutnant Harry Koch, was shot down. Schuhmacher, who flew as wingman to Koch, also came under attack but managed to nurse his damaged Fw 190 back to Woensdrecht Airfield. One of his Fw 190 wings had a hole of 30 centimeters (12 inches) in diameter, 23 machine gun hits had further damaged his aircraft.

On 13 July, II. Gruppe relocated from Woensdrecht to Rheine Airfield. At the time, Schuhmacher was assigned Fw 190 A-4 "yellow 8". Schuhmacher claimed his first aerial victory with JG 1, and fifth in total, on 14 October 1943 during the second Schweinfurt raid. On the second mission of the day, II. Gruppe intercepted a Boeing B-17 Flying Fortress formation during which Schuhmacher claimed an Herausschuss (separation shot)—a severely damaged heavy bomber forced to separate from its combat box which was counted as an aerial victory. On 11 November, the USAAF 1st and 3rd Bombardment Divisions dispatched 347 B-17 bombers, escorted by 401 Lockheed P-38 Lightning and Republic P-47 Thunderbolt fighter aircraft, against targets at Münster and Wesel. JG 1 was scrambled at 13:30 and vectored to a point of intercept in the area of Recklinghausen. JG 1 engaged the formation at 14:00 but failed to penetrate the USAAF fighter screen in force. For the loss of four pilots killed and three wounded, JG 1 pilots claimed ten aerial victories, including a P-47 by Schuhmacher which was not confirmed.

=== As wingman to Heinrich Bär ===
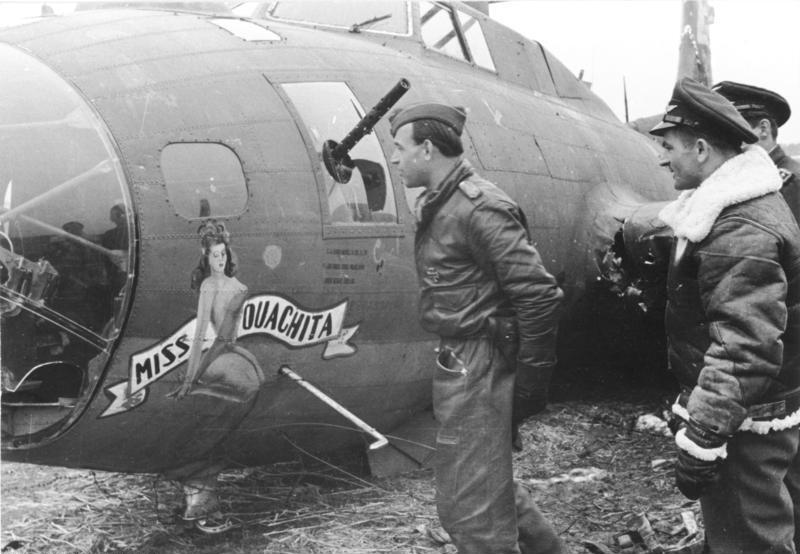
Major Heinrich Bär (center) on 21 February 1944 inspecting his 184th aerial victory "Miss Ouachita" a Boeing B-17F of 91st Bomb Group. Bär is wearing his favourite US leather flying jacket, his wingman Warrant Officer (Oberfeldwebel) Leo Schuhmacher is standing to his right.

On 4 January 1944, Major Heinrich Bär was transferred and assigned to 6. Staffel of JG 1 as an ordinary pilot. Bär's transfer and demotion had been the result of a disciplinary action "for cowardice before the enemy" initiated by Oberst Johannes Steinhoff, the commander of Jagdgeschwader 77. In consequence, Schuhmacher became Bär's regular wingman. On 11 January, the USAAF VIII Bomber Command attacked German aircraft manufacturing at Halberstadt, Magdeburg, Oschersleben and Braunschweig. In total 663 heavy bombers, escorted by 592 fighter aircraft were dispatched. Fifteen aircraft of II. Gruppe of JG 1 engaged a formation of 50 to 60 B-17 bombers in the area of Göttingen. In this encounter, Schuhmacher claimed a B-17 shot down.

On 3 March, the USAAF Eighth Air Force, formerly known as VIII Bomber Command, for the first time attempted a daytime attack on Berlin. Due to weather conditions, the attack had to be aborted before the bombers reached the target area. Nevertheless, II. Gruppe of JG 1 was scrambled at 10:49 and vectored to Delmenhorst where they met up with I. Gruppe of JG 1. In search for the heavy bombers, the formation came under attack by approximately 30 P-47 and 10 North American P-51 Mustang fighters. For the loss of two pilots killed in action, JG 1 pilots claimed three aerial victories, including a P-51 by Schuhmacher. Three days later on 6 March, the USAAF again targeted Berlin. On the second mission of the day, a formation of I. and II. Gruppe intercepted a formation of B-17 bombers south of Delmenhorst. In combat in an area of Assen, Schuhmacher claimed a B-17 shot down at 14:58.

On 15 March 1944, Bär was placed in command of II. Gruppe of JG 1 after its former commander, Hauptmann Hermann Segatz, was killed in action on 8 March 1944. In consequence, Schuhmacher was later transferred to the Gruppenstab (headquarters unit) of II. Gruppe. On 11 April, Schuhmacher claimed an aerial victory over a B-17 near Fallersleben. That day, the USAAF Eighth Air Force had sent 917 heavy bombers against the German aircraft industry in Oschersleben, Bernburg, Halberstadt, Sorau, present-day Żary, Poland, Cottbus and Arnimswalde, present-day Załom, Poland. On 11 May, the USAAF attacked targets in northeastern Belgium and Luxembourg. Due to technical issues with his aircraft, Bär did not participate on this mission and Schuhmacher was tasked with leading the Gruppe. That day, Oberst Walter Oesau, the commander of JG 1 was killed in action. In consequence, Bär was temporarily tasked with the leadership of JG 1 until Oberstleuntnant Herbert Ihlefeld took command on 20 May. On 19 May, Schuhmacher was credited with the destruction of a P-47.

In June, Bär was transferred to take command of Jagdgeschwader 3 "Udet" (JG 3—3rd Fighter Wing) after its former commander Major Friedrich-Karl Müller had been killed in a flight accident. As a result, Bär then had Schuhmacher transferred to the Geschwaderstab (headquarters unit) of JG 3. The Geschwaderstab moved to Reinsehlen Airfield on 15 September for a period of rest and replenishment. In mid-November, the Geschwaderstab relocated to an airfield at Störmede, present-day part of Geseke, where it was subordinated to the 3. Jagd Division (3rd Fighter Division). On 17 December, the Geschwaderstab began aerial operations in support of German ground forces fighting in the Ardennes Offensive, also known as the Battle of the Bulge. That day, Schuhmacher claimed a P-47 shot down. On 1 January 1945 during Operation Bodenplatte, Schuhmacher participated in JG 3's attack on the Eindhoven base and Gilze-Rijen airfield. In, March 1945, Schuhmacher was awarded the Knight's Cross of the Iron Cross (Ritterkreuz des Eisernen Kreuzes).

=== Flying the Messerschmitt Me 262 ===
On 23 April, Bär was transferred to the elite Jet Experten unit Jagdverband 44 (JV 44—44th Fighter Detachment) led by former General der Jagdflieger Adolf Galland. Again Bär had Schuhmacher join him as his wingman.

On 26 April, Galland led twelve Messerschmitt Me 262 jet fighters of JV 44 on a mission to engage Martin B-26 Marauder bombers of the 17th Bombardment Group. Schuhmacher flew his only sortie with JV 44 against B-26s that day. His cannons malfunctioned and he was forced to fly through the B-26 formation without firing a shot.

On 4 May, JV 44 surrendered to U.S. forces at Maxglan, near Salzburg. In the early morning hours, Bär had gathered the pilots of JV 44 for a final briefing. Bär ordered the remaining Me 262 destroyed before going into captivity and interrogation by US intelligence officers of the 1st Tactical Air Force's Air Prisoner of War Interrogation Unit, based at Heidelberg. Schuhmacher was captured and taken prisoner of war and released nine weeks later.

== Later life ==
Schuhmacher died on 13 February 1997 at the age of 83 in Bruchsal, Germany.

== Summary of career ==
=== Aerial victory claims ===
According to Obermaier, Schuhmacher was credited with 23 aerial victories victories claimed in approximately 250 combat missions. He claimed all of aerial victories over the Western Allies which includes ten four-engine heavy bombers. Mathews and Foreman, authors of Luftwaffe Aces — Biographies and Victory Claims, researched the German Federal Archives and state that he was credited with over eight aerial victory claims, plus further eight unconfirmed claims. This figure of confirmed claims includes at least three four-engine bombers.

Victory claims were logged to a map-reference (PQ = Planquadrat), for example "PQ 15 Ost S/HA – HB". The Luftwaffe grid map (Jägermeldenetz) covered all of Europe, western Russia and North Africa and was composed of rectangles measuring 15 minutes of latitude by 30 minutes of longitude, an area of about 360 square miles (930 km^{2}). These sectors were then subdivided into 36 smaller units to give a location area 3 km × 4 km (1.9 mi × 2.5 mi) in size.

Chronicle of aerial victories
This and the – (dash) indicates unconfirmed aerial victory claims for which Schuhmacher did not receive credit. This and the ? (question mark) indicates information discrepancies listed by Prien, Stemmer, Rodeike, Bock, Mathews and Foreman.
Claim	Date	Time	Type	Location	Claim	Date	Time	Type	Location
– 2. Staffel of Zerstörergeschwader 76 – Norway and Battle of Britain
1	12 April 1940	17:20	Wellington	near Stavanger	3	9 July 1940	10:15	Blenheim	near Stavanger
2	9 July 1940	10:08	Blenheim	near Stavanger	4	15 August 1940	12:50	Spitfire	east of Blythe
– 6. Staffel of Jagdgeschwader 1 – Defense of the Reich — October – 31 December 1943
—	14 October 1943	—	B-17		—	13 November 1943	—	P-38	
—	11 November 1943	—	P-47						
– 6. Staffel of Jagdgeschwader 1 – Defense of the Reich — 1 January – 8 April 1944
—	11 January 1944	—	B-17		6	23 March 1944	10:38	B-17	PQ 15 Ost S/HA – HB vicinity of Hildesheim
—	3 March 1944	11:50	P-51	PQ 05 Ost S/EU – 15 Ost S/EA	7? (Note: According to Mathews and Foreman this claim is unconfirmed.)	8 April 1944	13:51	B-24	southwest of Salzwedel
5	6 March 1944	14:58	B-17	PQ 05 Ost S/EO – FO south of Assen					
– Stab II. Gruppe of Jagdgeschwader 1 – Defense of the Reich — 11 April – 5 June 1944
8?	11 April 1944	11:00	B-17	PQ 15 Ost S/FB, north of Fallersleben	10	19 May 1944	12:35	P-47	PQ 05 Ost S/FQ – FR, Osnabrück
9	8 May 1944	09:39	B-24	PQ 05 Ost S/FT, northwest of Hanover					
– Stab of Jagdgeschwader 3 "Udet" – Defense of the Reich — 10 October – 31 December 1944
11?	17 December 1944	11:16	P-47	PQ 05 Ost OO – 6/9 / OP – 4/7					

=== Awards ===
- Iron Cross (1939) 2nd and 1st Class
- Knight's Cross of the Iron Cross on 1 March 1944 as pilot and Leutnant in the II./Jagdgeschwader 1
