= Jartypory =

- Village
- Location within Poland
- Coordinates: 52°25′N 22°6′E
- Country: Poland
- Voivodeship: Masovian
- County: Węgrów
- Gmina: Liw
- Population (2023): 704
- Time zone: UTC+1 (CET)
  - Summer (DST): UTC+2 (CEST)
- Postal code: 07-100
- ISO 3166 code: POL
- Vehicle registration: WWE

Jartypory [jartɨˈpɔrɨ] is a village in the administrative district of Gmina Liw, within Węgrów County, Masovian Voivodeship, in east-central Poland.
