= Witanki =

- Village
- Location within Poland
- Coordinates: 52°18′N 22°4′E
- Country: Poland
- Voivodeship: Masovian
- County: Węgrów
- Gmina: Liw
- Time zone: UTC+1 (CET)
  - Summer (DST): UTC+2 (CEST)
- Postal code: 07-100
- Area code: 25
- ISO 3166 code: POL
- Vehicle registration: WWE

Witanki [viˈtaŋki] is a village in the administrative district of Gmina Liw, within Węgrów County, Masovian Voivodeship, in east-central Poland.
