= Gmina Liw =

Gmina Liw Liw Commune
- Gmina
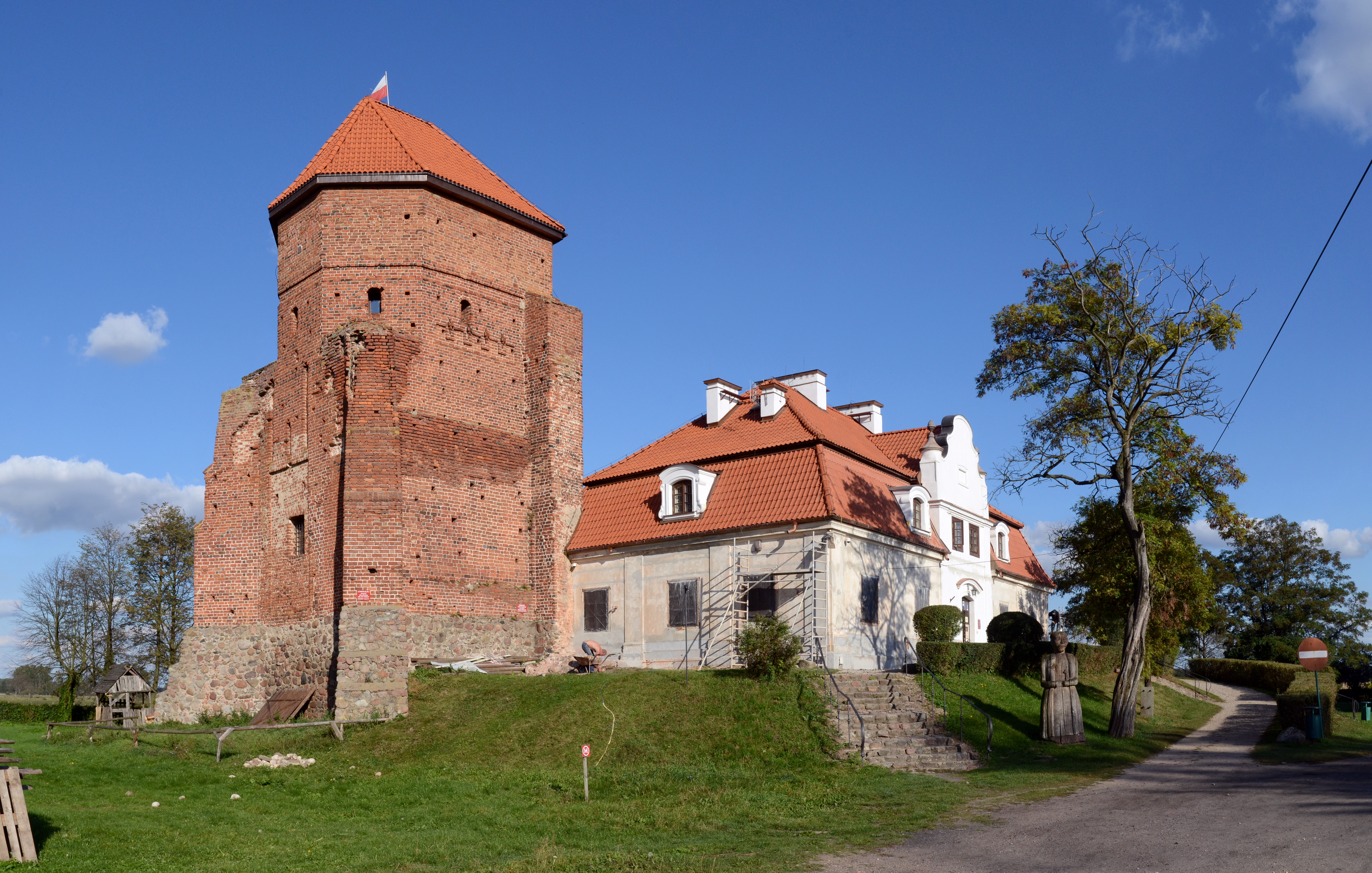
- Liw castle

- Coat of arms
- Interactive map of Gmina Liw
- Coordinates (Węgrów): 52°24′N 22°1′E
- Country: Poland
- Voivodeship: Masovian
- County: Węgrów
- Seat: Węgrów

Area
  - Total: 169.56 km^{2} (65.47 sq mi)

Population (2013)
  - Total: 7,616
  - Density: 44.92/km^{2} (116.3/sq mi)
- Website: http://www.liw.pl/

Gmina Liw is a rural gmina (administrative district) in Węgrów County, Masovian Voivodeship, in east-central Poland. It takes its name from the village of Liw (the site of a castle; formerly a town). The administrative seat of the gmina is the town of Węgrów, although the town is not part of the territory of the gmina.

The gmina covers an area of 169.56 square kilometres (65.5 sq mi), and as of 2006 its total population is 7,677 (7,616 in 2013).

== Villages ==
Gmina Liw contains the villages and settlements of Borzychy, Janowo, Jarnice, Jarnice-Pieńki, Jartypory, Krypy, Kucyk, Liw, Ludwinów, Ossolin, Pierzchały, Połazie, Popielów, Ruchenka, Ruchna, Śnice, Starawieś, Szaruty, Tończa, Tończa-Janówki, Witanki, Wyszków, Zając and Zawady.

== Neighbouring gminas ==
Gmina Liw is bordered by the town of Węgrów and by the gminas of Bielany, Grębków, Korytnica, Miedzna, Mokobody, Sokołów Podlaski, Stoczek and Wierzbno.
