= Borzychy =

- Village
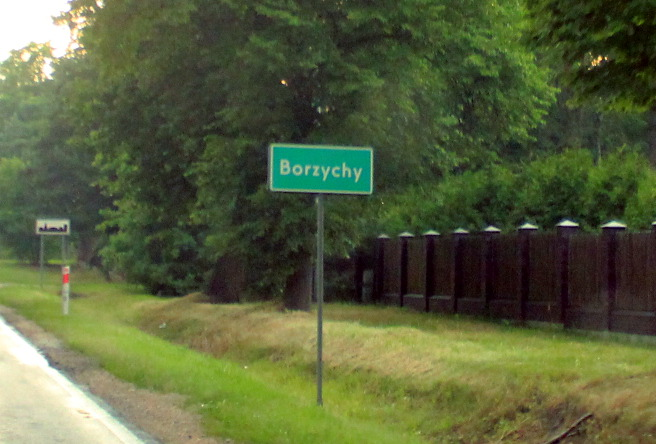

- Location within Poland
- Coordinates: 52°28′N 21°55′E
- Country: Poland
- Voivodeship: Masovian
- County: Węgrów
- Gmina: Liw
- Time zone: UTC+1 (CET)
  - Summer (DST): UTC+2 (CEST)
- Postal code: 07-100
- ISO 3166 code: POL
- Vehicle registration: WWE

Borzychy [bɔˈʐɨxɨ] is a village in the administrative district of Gmina Liw, within Węgrów County, Masovian Voivodeship, in east-central Poland.
