= Tończa, Węgrów County =

Tończa
- Village
- Location within Poland
- Coordinates: 52°28′N 21°58′E
- Country: Poland
- Voivodeship: Masovian
- County: Węgrów
- Gmina: Liw
- Population: 666
- Time zone: UTC+1 (CET)
  - Summer (DST): UTC+2 (CEST)
- Postal code: 07-100
- ISO 3166 code: POL

Tończa [ˈtɔɲt͡ʂa] is a village in the administrative district of Gmina Liw, within Węgrów County, Masovian Voivodeship, in east-central Poland.
