= Krypy, Gmina Liw =

Krypy
- Village
- Location within Poland
- Coordinates: 52°23′49″N 21°59′32″E
- Country: Poland
- Voivodeship: Masovian
- County: Węgrów
- Gmina: Liw
- Time zone: UTC+1 (CET)
  - Summer (DST): UTC+2 (CEST)
- Postal code: 07-100
- ISO 3166 code: POL
- Vehicle registration: WWE

Krypy [ˈkrɨpɨ] is a village in the administrative district of Gmina Liw, within Węgrów County, Masovian Voivodeship, in east-central Poland.
