= Zając, Masovian Voivodeship =

Zając
- Village
- Location within Poland
- Coordinates: 52°20′N 22°3′E
- Country: Poland
- Voivodeship: Masovian
- County: Węgrów
- Gmina: Liw
- Time zone: UTC+1 (CET)
  - Summer (DST): UTC+2 (CEST)
- Postal code: 07-100
- ISO 3166 code: POL
- Vehicle registration: WWE

Zając [ˈzajɔnt͡s] is a village in the administrative district of Gmina Liw, within Węgrów County, Masovian Voivodeship, in east-central Poland.

Before the 1998 local boundary reforms it was administratively part of the Siedlce Voivodeship.
