= Śnice, Masovian Voivodeship =

Śnice
- Village
- Location within Poland
- Coordinates: 52°23′19″N 22°04′39″E
- Country: Poland
- Voivodeship: Masovian
- County: Węgrów
- Gmina: Liw
- Time zone: UTC+1 (CET)
  - Summer (DST): UTC+2 (CEST)
- Postal code: 07-100
- ISO 3166 code: POL
- Vehicle registration: WWE

Śnice [ˈɕnit͡sɛ] is a village in the administrative district of Gmina Liw, within Węgrów County, Masovian Voivodeship, in east-central Poland.
