= Załom, Goleniów County =

Załom
- Village
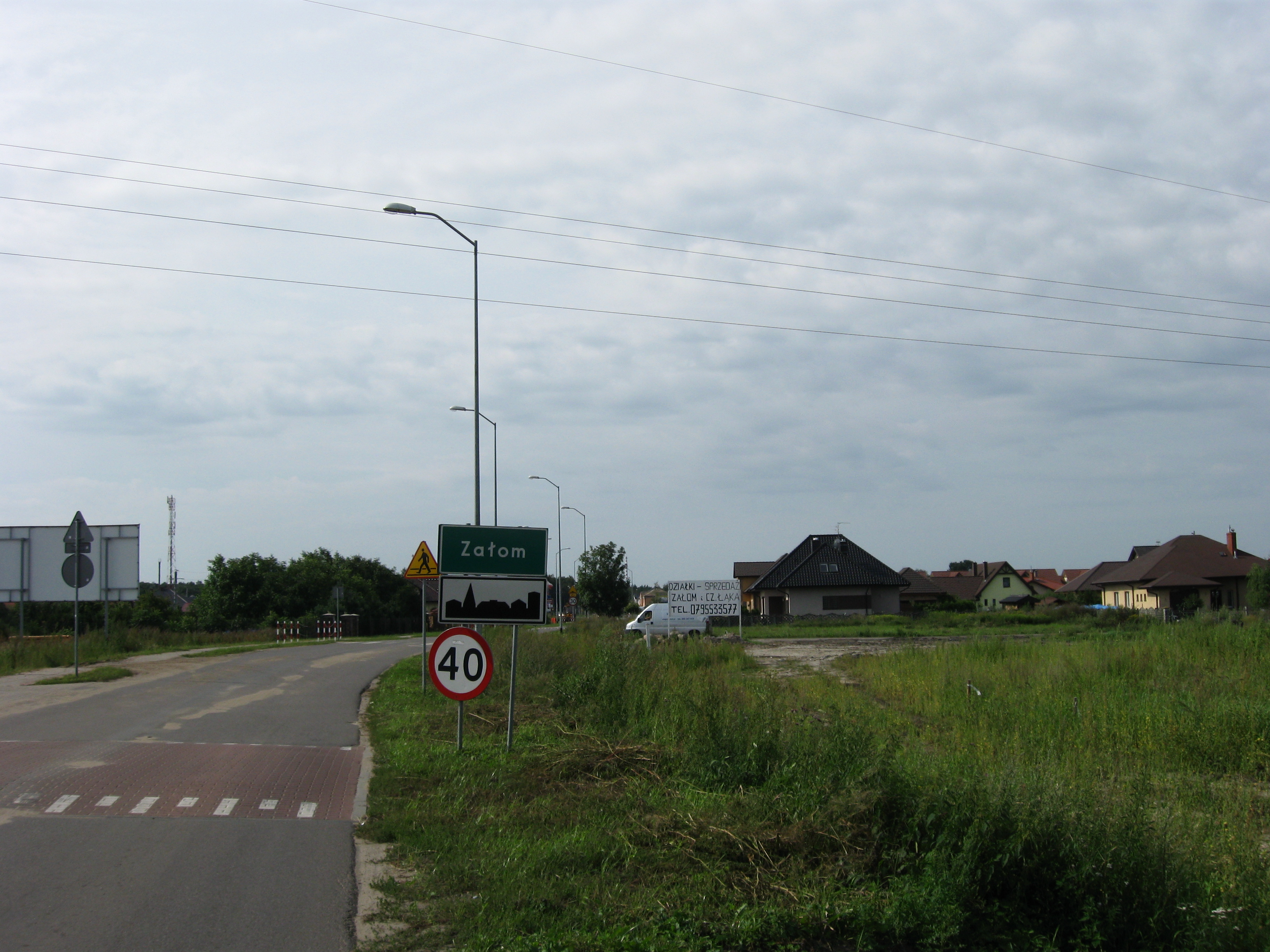

- Location within Poland
- Coordinates: 53°26′14″N 14°43′49″E
- Country: Poland
- Voivodeship: West Pomeranian
- County: Goleniów
- Gmina: Goleniów
- Time zone: UTC+1 (CET)
  - Summer (DST): UTC+2 (CEST)
- Vehicle registration: ZGL

Załom [ˈzawɔm] is a village in the administrative district of Gmina Goleniów, within Goleniów County, West Pomeranian Voivodeship, in north-western Poland. It lies approximately 14 km (9 mi) south-west of Goleniów and 11 km (7 mi) east of the regional capital Szczecin.

In 1964, a part of the village was included within the city limits of Szczecin, now known as the neighbourhood of Załom-Kasztanowe.
