= Starawieś =

- Village
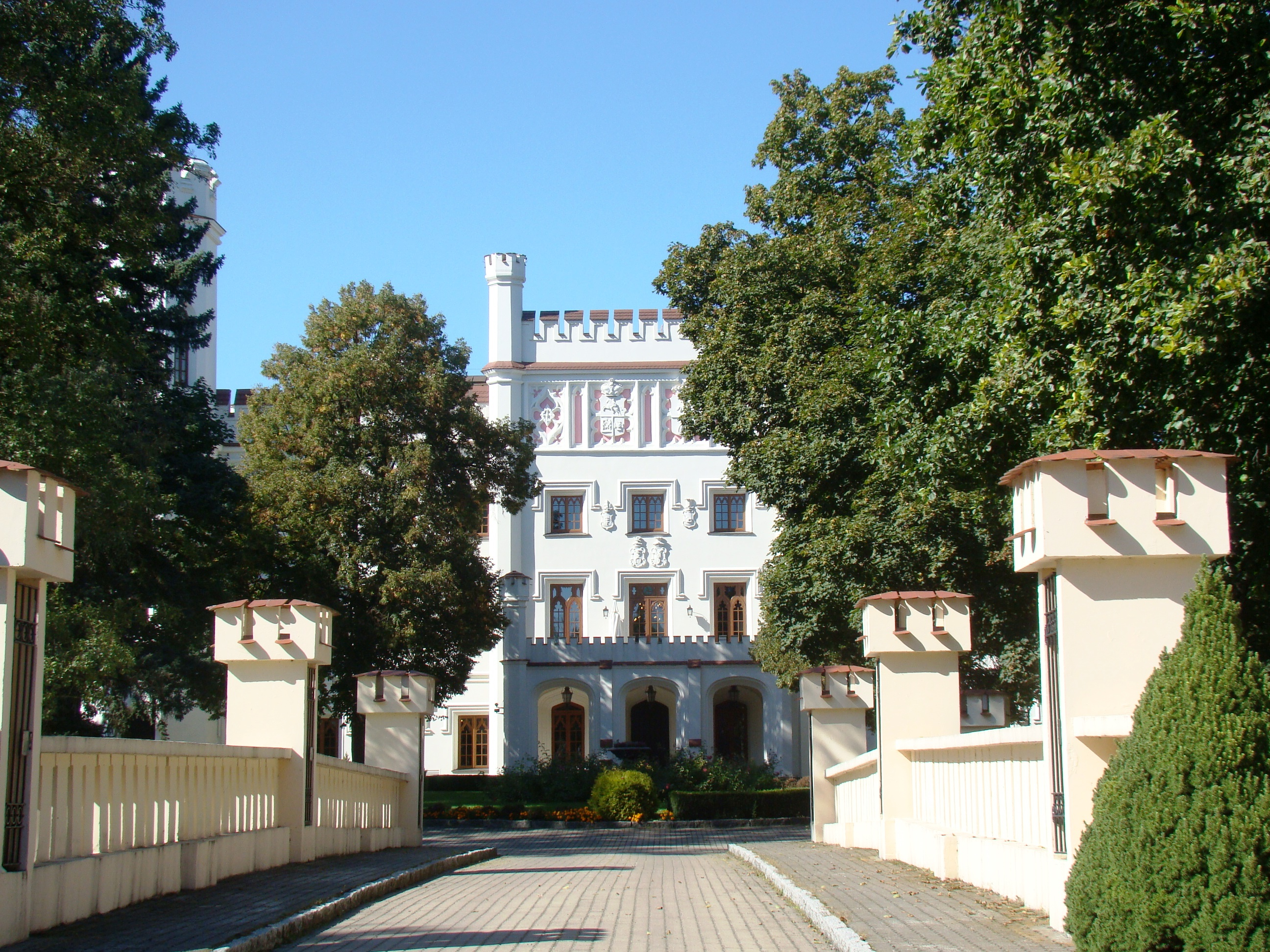
- Palace in Starawieś

- Location within Poland
- Coordinates: 52°27′22″N 21°56′43″E
- Country: Poland
- Voivodeship: Masovian
- County: Węgrów
- Gmina: Liw

Population
  - Total: 560
- Time zone: UTC+1 (CET)
  - Summer (DST): UTC+2 (CEST)
- Postal code: 07-100
- ISO 3166 code: POL
- Vehicle registration: WWE

Starawieś [staˈravjɛɕ] is a village in the administrative district of Gmina Liw, within Węgrów County, Masovian Voivodeship, in east-central Poland.
